= Tatar dragon =

Tatar dragon may refer to:

- Zilant
- Yelbeghen

== See also ==
- Chuvash dragons
- Yuxa
