= List of shapeshifters =

Various characters and creatures in fiction, folklore and legend have the ability to shapeshift.

== Human turning into an animal ==
- Berserker
- Erchitu
- Ijiraq
- Loogaroo
- Nagual
- Māui
- Nanaue - the shark-man of Hawaiian legend
- Nereus
- Púca
- Skin-walker
- Wendigo
- Werecat
- Weredog
- Werehyena
- Werejaguar
- Weretiger
- Werewolf

== Animal turning into a human ==
- Bak (Assamese aqueous creature)
- Bakeneko and Nekomata (cat)
- Boto Encantado (river dolphin)
- Mąʼii (Coyote)
- Itachi (weasel or marten)
- Jorōgumo and Tsuchigumo (spider)
- Kitsune, Huli Jing, hồ ly tinh and Kumiho (fox)
- Kawauso (river otter)
- Kushtaka (otter)
- Lady White Snake, Ichchhadhari Nag and Yuxa (snake)
- Pipa Jing (jade pipa)
- Selkie (seal)
- Tanuki (racoon dog)
- Mujina (badger)
- Toyotama-hime (crocodile or shark)
- Tsuru Nyōbō (crane)
- Kaeru Nyōbō (frog)
- Hamaguri Nyōbō (clam)
- Tako Nyōbō (octopus)

== Other ==
- Ala
- Aswang
- Baba Yaga
- Banshee
- Chananic
- Changeling
- Demon
- Doppelgänger
- Empousa
- Hellhounds in Latin American folklore like Huay Chivo and Nahual.
- Jinn
- Kelpie
- Lamia
- Moura Encantada
- Monkey King (from Journey to the West)
- Manananggal
- Mangkukulam
- Māui
- Nixie
- Rakshasa
- Rusalka
- Saci
- Spring-heeled Jack
- Tengu
- Tiyanak
- Verechelen
- Yaksha
- Yokai
- Yaoguai
- Yogoe

== In fiction ==
- Aku
- Amethyst
- Beast Boy
- Ben Tennyson
- Bill Cipher
- Cosmo and Wanda (fairy)
- Clayface
- Ditto
- Jake the Dog
- Dr. Jekyll/Mr. Hyde
- Double Trouble (She-Ra)
- It
- Jenny Wakeman
- Madame Rouge
- Mahito
- Martian Manhunter
- Mimic
- Mystique
- Nimona
- SpongeBob
- The Thing
- Werebat: Human with the ability to change into a bat-like form, appears in modern fiction.
- Werecoyote: Human with the ability to change into a coyote form comparable to a werewolf, appears in modern fiction. It has been associated with America.
