= Shahmaran =

Mythical creature in West and Central Asian cultures

Shāhmārān
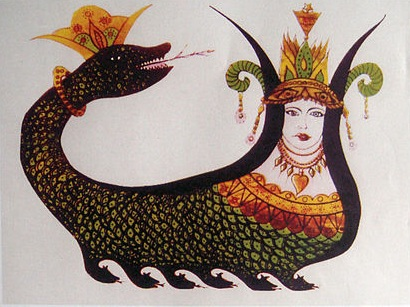
- The Shahmaran

Creature information
- Other name: Shah (king) of the Snakes
- Grouping: Mythical creature
- Folklore: Iranian folklore, Turkish folklore, Kurdish mythology

Shahmaran (Note: Persian: شاهماران, romanized: Shahmaran; Kurdish: Şahmaran/Şamaran; Turkish: Şahmeran; Tatar: Şahmara, Zilant, Зилант, Aq Yılan; Chuvash: Вĕреçĕлен, lit. 'Fire snake') is a mythical creature, half-woman and half-snake, originating in Indo-Iranian or Turkic folklores.

== Etymology ==
The name Shāhmārān comes from the Persian words Shāh (شاه), and mārān (ماران; transl. 'snakes'; sing. مار mar). Hence, the name Shāhmārān literally means 'the king of snakes'.

== Description ==
Shahmaran is a mythical creature, half-snake and half-woman, portrayed as a dual-headed creature with a crown on each head, possessing a human female head on one end, and a snake's head on the other, possibly representing a phallic figure. The human part is also decorated with a large necklace.

== Mythological accounts ==
Shahmaran is attested in Middle Eastern literature, such as in the tale "The Story of Yemliha: An Underground Queen" from the 1001 Arabian Nights, and in the Camasb-name. Her story seems to be present in the Eastern part of the Anatolian peninsula, or in southeastern and eastern Turkey (comprising areas of Kurd, Arab, Assyrian and Turkish communities).

=== Jamasp-Name ===
Due to its antiquity, there are many variations of the same story.

In one version, the first human Shahmaran encounters is a young man named Jamasp (Persian: Jāmāsp جاماسپ), who is also known by Yada Jamsab (other spellings are Jambs, Camasb, and Jamisav). Jamasp gets stuck in a cave after he tries to steal honey with a few friends, his friends leave him alone in the cave. He decides to explore the cave and finds a passage to a chamber that looks like a mystical and beautiful garden with thousands of off-white colored snakes and the Shahmaran living together harmoniously. At this point Shahmaran and Jamasp fall in love and live in the cave chamber, and the Shahmaran teaches him about medicines and medicinal herbs. Jamasp misses living above ground and wants to leave, he tells the Shahmaran he will not share the secret of her living there. Many years pass.

The king of Tarsus becomes ill and the vizier discovers the treatment of his condition requires Shahmaran's flesh. Jamasp tells the townspeople where Shahmaran lives, according to the legend Shahmaran says, "blanch me in an earthen dish, give my extract to the vizier, and feed my flesh to the sultan." They bring her to the town and kill her in a bath called, "Şahmaran Hamam". The king eats her flesh and lives, the vizier drinks the extract and dies. Jamasp drinks the water of Shahmaran and becomes a doctor, by gaining the Shahmaran's wisdom.

=== In The Arabian Nights ===
A similar narrative is attested in the One Thousand and One Nights corpus, with the title The Queen of the Serpents: a Greek philosopher named Daniel has a son named Hasîb Karîm al-Dîn. At a certain point in the story, Hasîb falls into a cistern, but escapes and reaches the lair of serpents and meets their human-faced leader, who introduces herself as Yamlîkhâ, "queen of the serpents". After a while, Hasîb wishes to return to the upper world, but the queen of serpents warns him that he will enter a bathhouse and this will lead to her death. Despite her grim prediction, Hasîb promises never to enter a bathhouse and is let go. However, just as the serpent queen foretold, Hasîb enters a bathhouse, which initiates a chain of events that leads to an evil vizier summoning the queen from the well. Resigning to her fate, the queen instructs Hasîb: she is to be cut up and her meat cooked, and the broth must be placed in three phials; the first phial is to be given to the vizier, but Hasîb has but to drink from the second. It happens thus: the evil vizier drinks from the first phial and dies, while Hasîb drinks from the second one and gains universal knowledge about the sciences. According to scholars Ulrich Marzolph and Richard van Leewen, the hero's name, "Hâsib", is an Arabic rendering of the Persian name "Jamasp".

== Popular culture ==
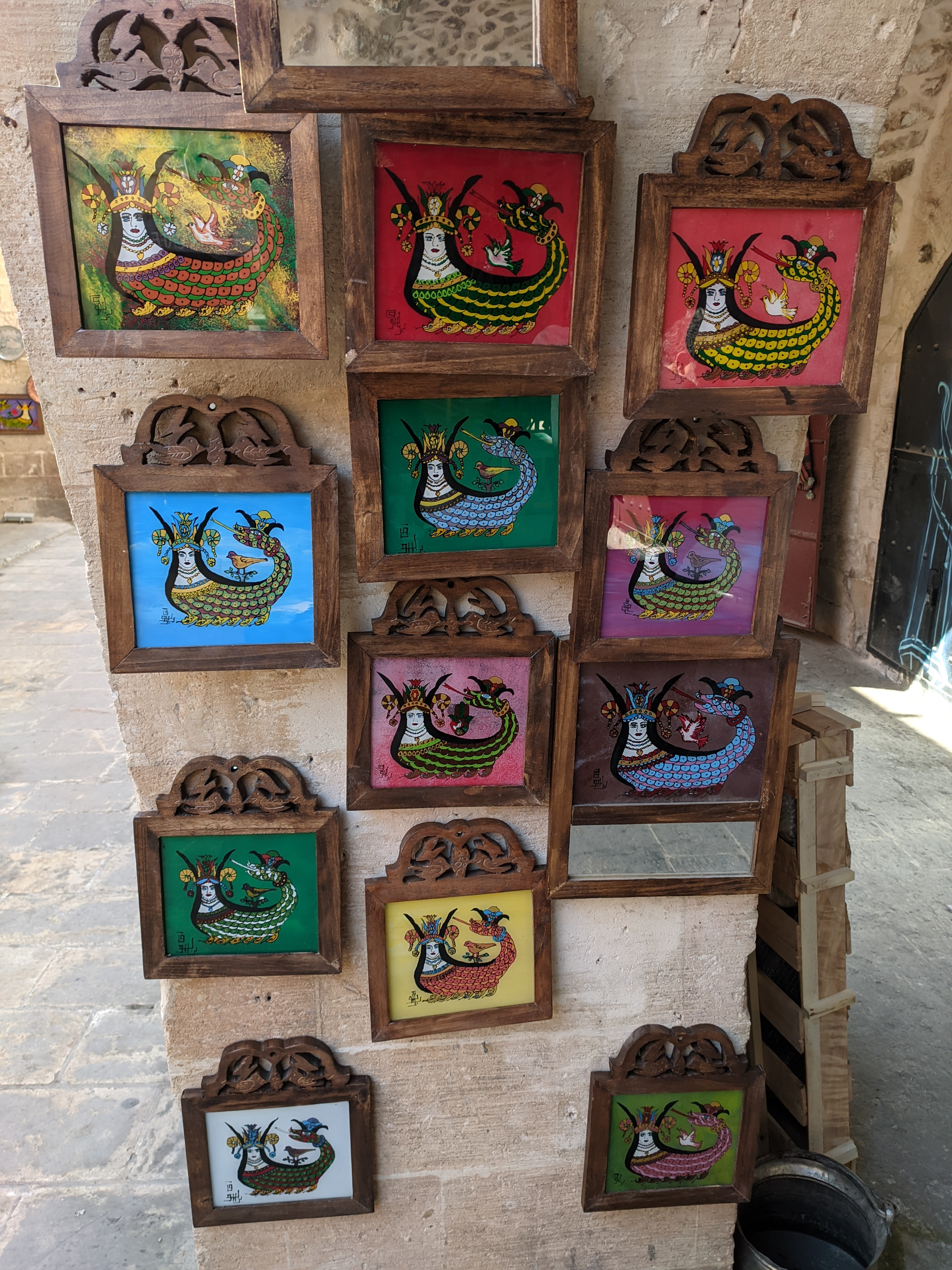
Shahmaran pictures on sale in Mardin, Turkey

=== Folklore ===
The Kurds have traditionally viewed the serpent as a symbol of luck and strength, and they continue to have images of Shahmaran on glass or metal work, which is in turn displayed on their walls.

In Turkey, Shahmaran is believed to live in the Mediterranean town of Tarsus, and a similar legend is told in the eastern portion of the country, namely Mardin, a town with a large Kurdish and Arab population. In these regions her legend is commonly evoked, with her image depicted in embroidery, fabrics, rugs, and jewelry. The story and imagery of Shahmaran are considered a national treasure in Turkey.

Scholars Wolfram Eberhard and Pertev Naili Boratav devised a classification system for Turkish folktales and narratives, called Typen türkischer Volksmärchen ("Turkish Folktale Catalogue"). In their joint work, they registered a Turkish tale type indexed as TTV 57, "Der Schlangenkönig Schahmeran" ("The Serpent King Shahmeran"), with 7 variants listed. In this tale type, the hero (a poor boy named Cami Sap, Camesel, or Canibis) goes to the woods and falls into a pit or hole where he meets Shahmeran; after some years down there, he returns to civilization; later, the antagonist (a local padishah or a sorcerer, depending on the variant) is alerted of Shahmeran's presence and wishes to consume of its flesh; Shahmeran instructs the poor boy: he is to cook its flesh and drink its broth, but only the second serving, and let the antagonist drink it first; the antagonist does and dies, while the hero becomes a skillful healer.

=== Other accounts ===
Many of the versions of the story of Shahmaran are found in fictional books including the J.C. Mardrus translation of The Thousand Nights and One Night as the story of "Jemlia - the Sultan of Underground" and The Ring of Shah Maran, A Story from the Mountains of Kurdistan by Raphael Emmanuel (1944). The latter tells the folk story of a boy that shares bread with animals and earns the respect of Shahmaran.

According to Uzbek folklorist Mansur Afzalov, in the Uzbek tale "Ибн Сино билан Ибн Хорис" ("Ibn Sina and Ibn Khoris"), Ibn Sina is welcomed by "Шохиморон" ("Shohimoron"), the snake king, into the snakes' den. Ibn Sina also drinks a broth made from the snake and gains magical powers.

A version of the tale of Shahmaran was collected from an Uyghur source, titled Şahmaran’ın Hikâyesi ("The Story of Shahmaran"), wherein a youth named Cihanşah befriends Shahmaran, the ruler of the snakes which lives in the bottom of a well, and becomes vizier after drinking the third serving from a broth made with Shahmaran's flesh.

=== Other uses ===
Dutch singer of Iranian descent, Sevdaliza, included a song titled "Shahmaran" on her debut studio album ISON.

Since c. 2016, LGBTQ supporters in Turkey and locations in the Middle East have been using the image of Shahmaran as symbol of supporting LGBTQ issues. Shahmaran's image has also been used to symbolize the strength of Kurdish women by artists Zehra Doğan and Canan Senol. In 2020, the Mardin Metropolitan Municipality in Turkey hosted a public art exhibition, Shahmaran Mardin, featuring Shahmaran statues artist by Ayla Turan, that were decorated by local artists and businesses.

The 2023 Netflix series Shahmaran is also built around the legend in a modern setting.

== Historical references ==
The Shah Maran–Daulatabad basin is an ancient irrigation system from the Iron Age, found in the 1960s and 1970s near Tepe Yahya in southwestern Iran.

In Adana in southern Turkey, the Yılankale (Snake Castle) is locally known as the home of Shahmaran.

Shahmeran Hamam, a historical hamam (Turkish bathhouse) in Tarsus, Turkey, is associated with Shahmaran.

== See also ==
- List of dragons in mythology and folklore
- Serpent symbolism

Mythological dragons, serpents, and snakes

- Illuyanka – serpentine dragon from Hittite mythology and religion
- Nāga – half-human half-snake being, found in Hindu mythology and Buddhist mythology.
- Verechelen – mythical creature between a dragon and a snake, often depicted with multiple heads, originating from Volga Bulgaria.
- Zahhak – an evil serpent creature, originating in Persian mythology and folklore.
- Zilant – mythical creature between a dragon and a wyvern, originating in Kazan.

== Video ==
Short BBC documentary on the shahmaran
