= List of legendary creatures (Y) =

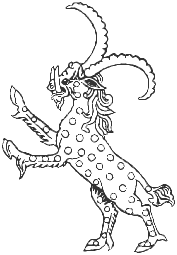
Heraldic image of a Yale.

1. Yacumama (South America) – Sea monster
2. Yacuruna (Indigenous people of the Amazon) – Mythical water people, with backwards heads and feet
3. Yadōkai (Japanese) – Malevolent, nocturnal spirit
4. Yagyō-san (Japanese) – Demon who rides through the night on a headless horse
5. Yaksha (Buddhist, Hindu, and Jainism) – Male nature spirit
6. Yakshi (Keralite) – Vampire
7. Yakshini (Buddhist, Hindu, and Jainism) – Female nature spirit
8. Yakubyō-gami (Japanese) – Disease and misfortune spirit
9. Yale (Medieval Bestiaries) – Antelope- or goat-like animal with swiveling horns
10. Yali (Hinduism) – Lion like creature often symbolic for protecting temples
11. Yallery-Brown (English) – Nature spirit
12. Yama (China, Korea, Japan, Buddhism, including Tibet) – Wrathful god
13. Yama-biko (Japanese) – Echo spirit
14. Yama-bito (Japanese) – Savage, mountain-dwelling humanoid
15. Yama-chichi (Japanese) – Monkey-like mountain spirit
16. Yama-inu (Japanese) – Dog-like mountain spirit
17. Yama-otoko (Japanese) – Mountain giant
18. Yamata no Orochi (Japanese) – Gigantic, eight-headed serpent
19. Yama-uba (Japanese) – Malevolent, mountain-dwelling hag
20. Yama-waro (Japanese) – Hairy, one-eyed spirit
21. Yanari (Japanese) – Spirit which causes strange noises
22. Yan-gant-y-tan (Breton) - demon
23. Yaoguai (Chinese) – Animalistic demon or fallen gods
24. Yara-ma-yha-who (Australian Aboriginal) – Diminutive, sucker-fingered vampire
25. Yatagarasu (Japanese) – Three-legged crow of Amaterasu
26. Yato-no-kami (Japanese) – Serpent spirits
27. Yeth hound (English) – Headless dog
28. Yeti (Himalayan) – Mountain bigfoot
29. Yilbegän (Turkic) – Either a dragon or a giant
30. Yobuko (Japanese) – Mountain dwelling spirit
31. Yōkai (Japanese) – Supernatural monster
32. Yomotsu-shikome (Japanese) – Underworld hag
33. Yong – Korean dragon
34. Yōsei (Japanese) – Fairy
35. Yosuzume (Japanese) – Mysterious bird that sings at night, sometimes indicating that the okuri-inu is near
36. You Hun Ye Gui (Chinese) – Wandering ghost
37. Yowie (Australian Aboriginal) – Nocturnal human-ape hybrid, also Yahoo
38. Ypotryll (Heraldic) – Boar-camel-ox-serpent hybrid
39. Yuan Gui (Chinese) – Distressed ghost
40. Yukinko (Japanese) – Childlike snow spirit
41. Yuki-onna (Japanese) – Female snow spirit
42. Yūrei (Japanese) – Ghost
43. Yuxa (Tatar) – 100-year-old snake that transforms into a beautiful human
