= Kiymet Bock =

Kurdish artist

Kiymet Benita Bock is a Kurdish artist based in Hamburg, Germany.

== Personal life ==
Kiymet Bock was born in 1956 in Erciş, Turkey. She was educated in her home country as teacher. She became paralysed after contracting Poliovirus in 1979. After 8 years she could move her hands again. She married artist Karl Otto Bock. In 1987 and emigrated to Hamburg, Germany. She began to attend the Hamburg art group Die Schlumper, a circle of artistically talented people with mental, physical or social handicap.

== Work ==
In 1990, Kiymet began creating paintings by using specific shapes and details evoking traditional forms from Africa or Oceania. Her early work is influenced by Joan Miró and Paul Klee. Her paintings also reveal strong ties to the traditional Kurdish folklore. They are dominated by a love of nature, especially visible in the soft lines of the drawings. She has produced many paintings such as Lila Luft (Purple Air) in 1994 and Mein Pferd (My Horse) in 1996. Her work is in the collection of the Slovak National Gallery.

== Awards ==
- 1st prize for painting, 2nd International Biennial of Disabled People's Art in Kraków, 1992.
- 1st prize for painting, 6th International Biennial of Disabled People's Art in Kraków, 1996.
- Participation INSITA Slovak National Gallery, receives Grand Prix 2000 INSITA< Batislava
- SOLO EXHIBITION 2004 AS GRAND PRIX Laureate 2000, Slovak National Gallery, Bratislava, 2004
