= Tarsus =

Tarsus may refer to:

== Biology ==
- Tarsus (skeleton), a cluster of articulating bones in each foot
- Hock (anatomy), the region formed by the tarsal bones connecting the tibia and metatarsus of a digitigrade or unguligrade quadrupedal mammal
- Tarsus (eyelids), elongated plate of dense connective tissue in each eyelid
- Arthropod tarsus, The distal leg segment of an insect or other arthropod
- The lower leg of a bird, also known as tarsometatarsus

== Places ==
- Tarsus, Mersin, ancient and modern city in Turkey (former region of Cilicia)
- Tarsus (West Syriac Diocese), a Syrian Orthodox archdiocese, attested between the seventh and thirteenth centuries
- Tarsus Waterfall, on the outskirts of the city
- Berdan River, also known as the Tarsus River, which flows past the city
- Tarsus (Bithynia), a town of ancient Bithynia, now in Turkey
- Tarsus (crater), an impact crater on Mars

== Other uses ==
- Tarsus (1948–1960), a Turkish Maritime Lines ship, formerly the USS Harry Lee
