= Shahmeran Hamam =

Historical bathhouse in Tarsus, Turkey

Coordinates: 36°55′03″N 34°53′49″E

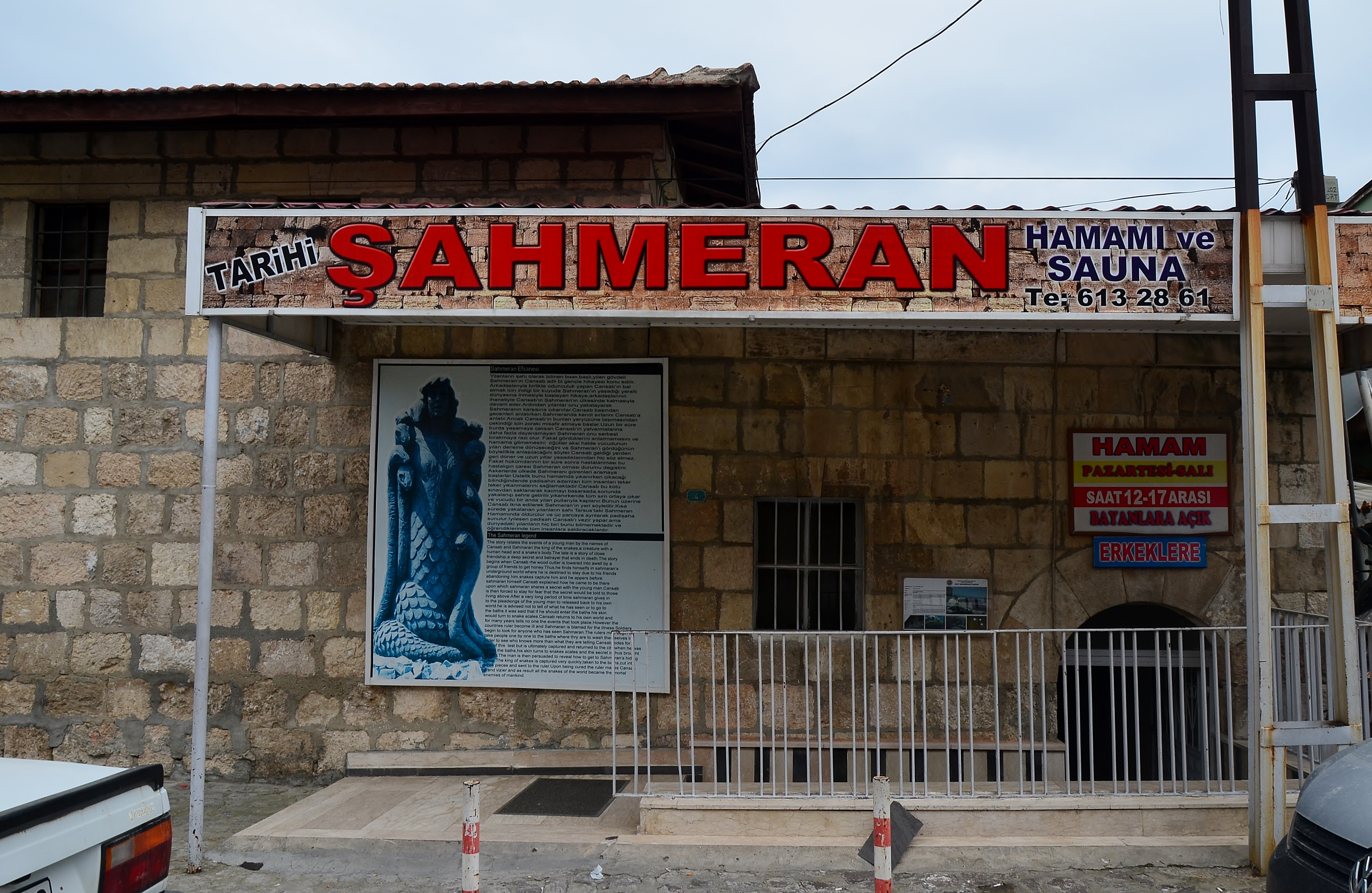
Entrance to Shahmeran Hammam.

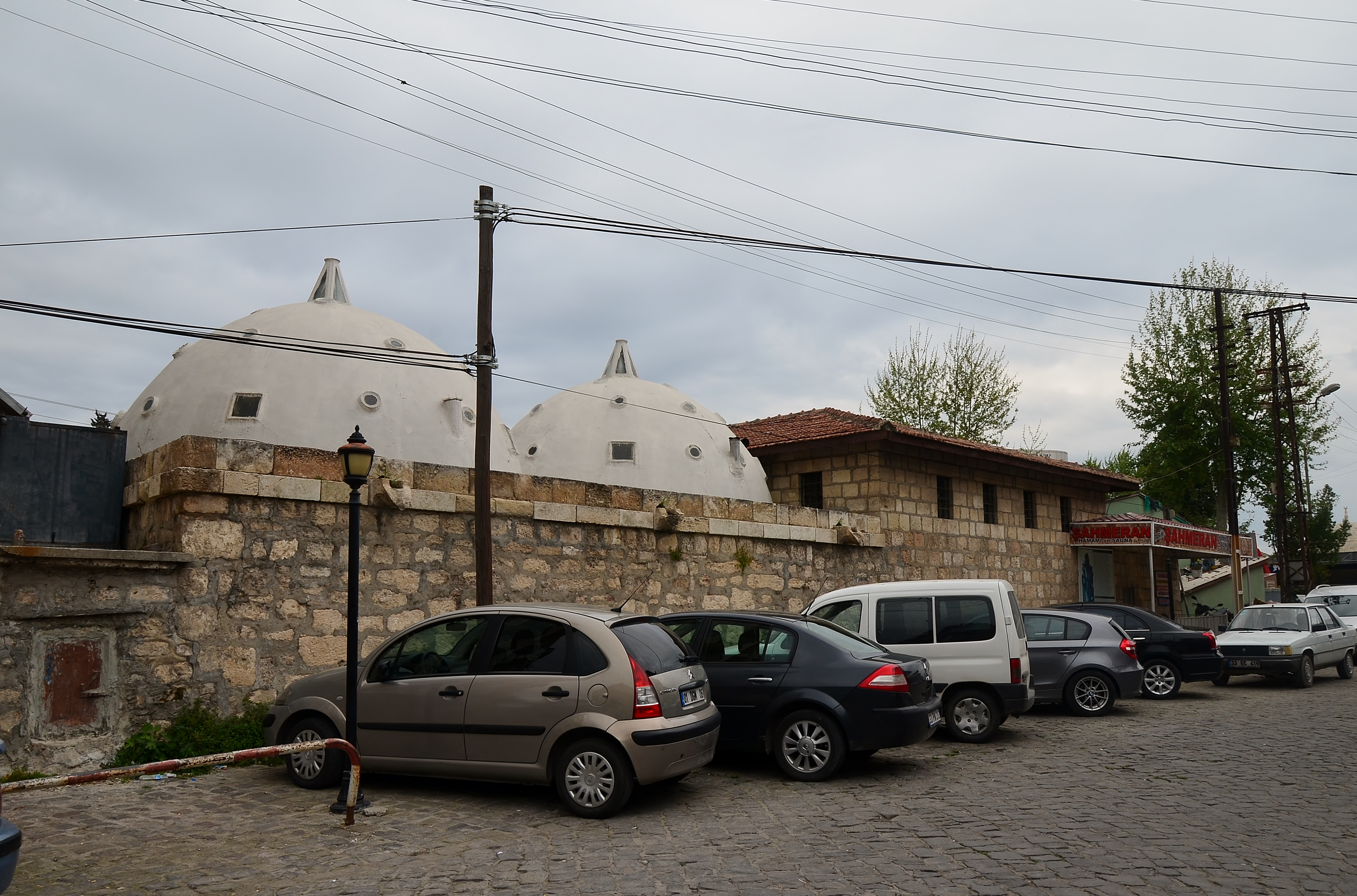
Domes of Shahmeran Hamam seen at its backside.

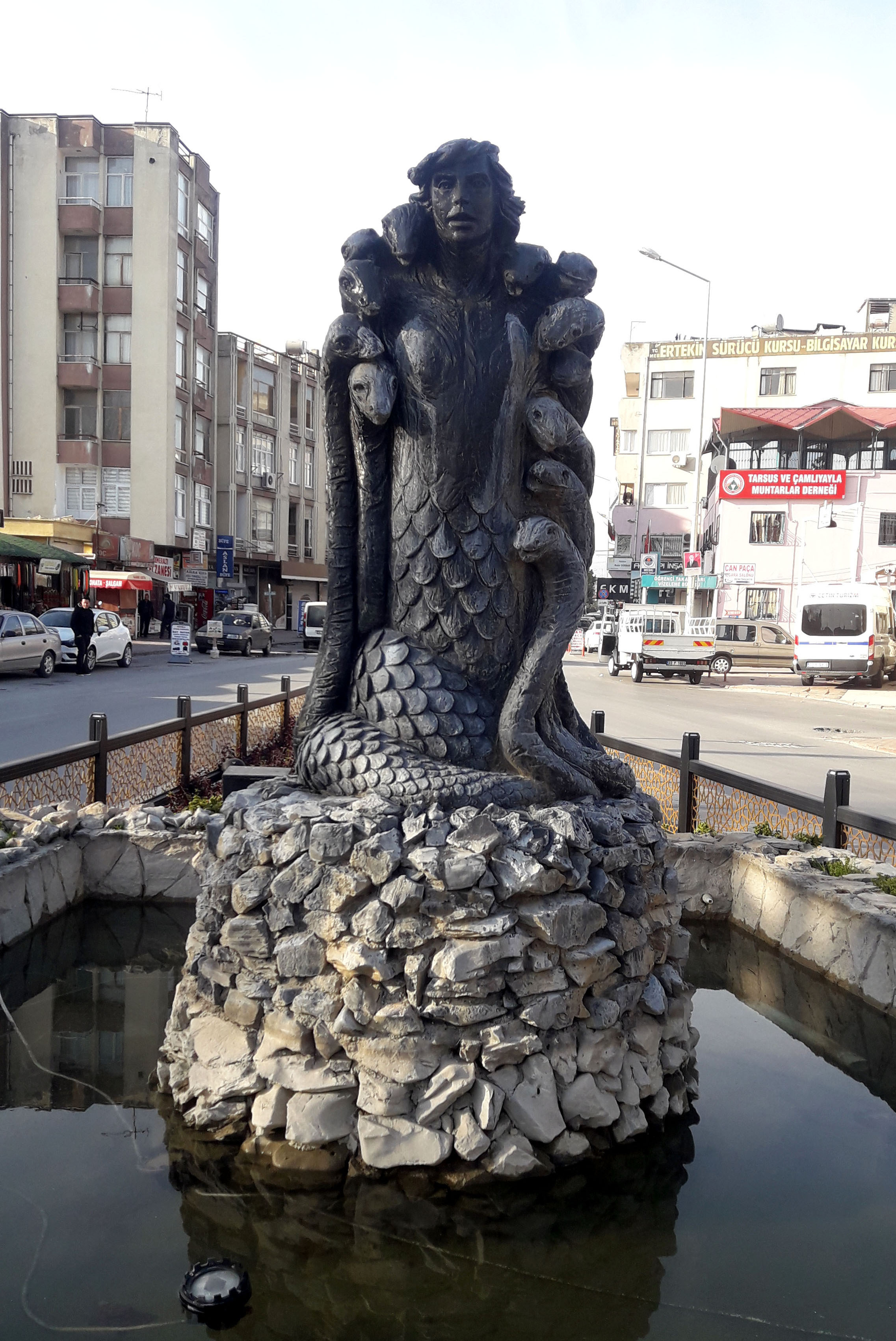
The statue of Shahmeran in Tarsus, Turkey

Shahmeran Hamam (Turkish: Şahmeran Hamamı) is a historical hamam (bathhouse) in Tarsus, Turkey, associated with the legendary story of Shahmaran.

== Hamam ==
The hamam or Turkish bathhouse is in the urban fabric (Kızılmurat neighborhood), within the Tarsus district of the Mersin Province in Turkey.

The bath house was built on the foundations of an older Roman bath by the Ramazanids, a beylik, which was sovereign between the 14th and 16th centuries. During the Ottoman Empire era in 1873, it was restored. The rectangular plan hamam has four iwans, the building material is rubble stone and main parts of the hamam are covered by a dome. In addition to common hamam, there are ten wooden private rooms with bath.

== Legend of Shahmaran ==
Shahmaran is a mythical creature, half woman and half snake and the monarch of the snakes. There are several versions of the tale, since it is an older story. It involves the relationship between the Shahmaran creature and a young man, and the man later betrays their trust. Towards the end of the tale, the Shahmaran leaves their cave and is killed by the townspeople in a bathhouse that bears the same name as this one.

On the wall of the hamam, there are some red spots, which are the sources of the legend. However, there are many variations of the story and some believe this happened in a different location.
