= Tarsus (crater) =

Tarsus Crater
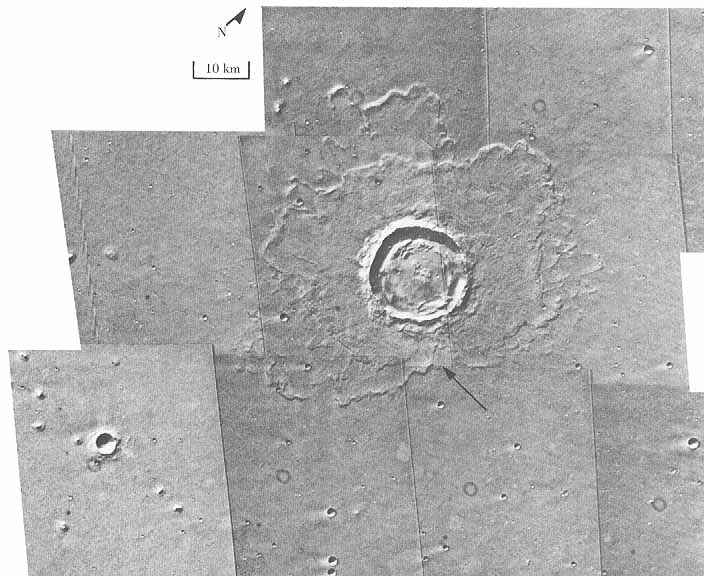
- Mosaic of Viking Orbiter images
- Planet: Mars
- Coordinates: 23.12°N 40.26°W
- Quadrangle: Oxia Palus
- Diameter: 18.55 km (11.53 mi)
- Eponym: Tarsus

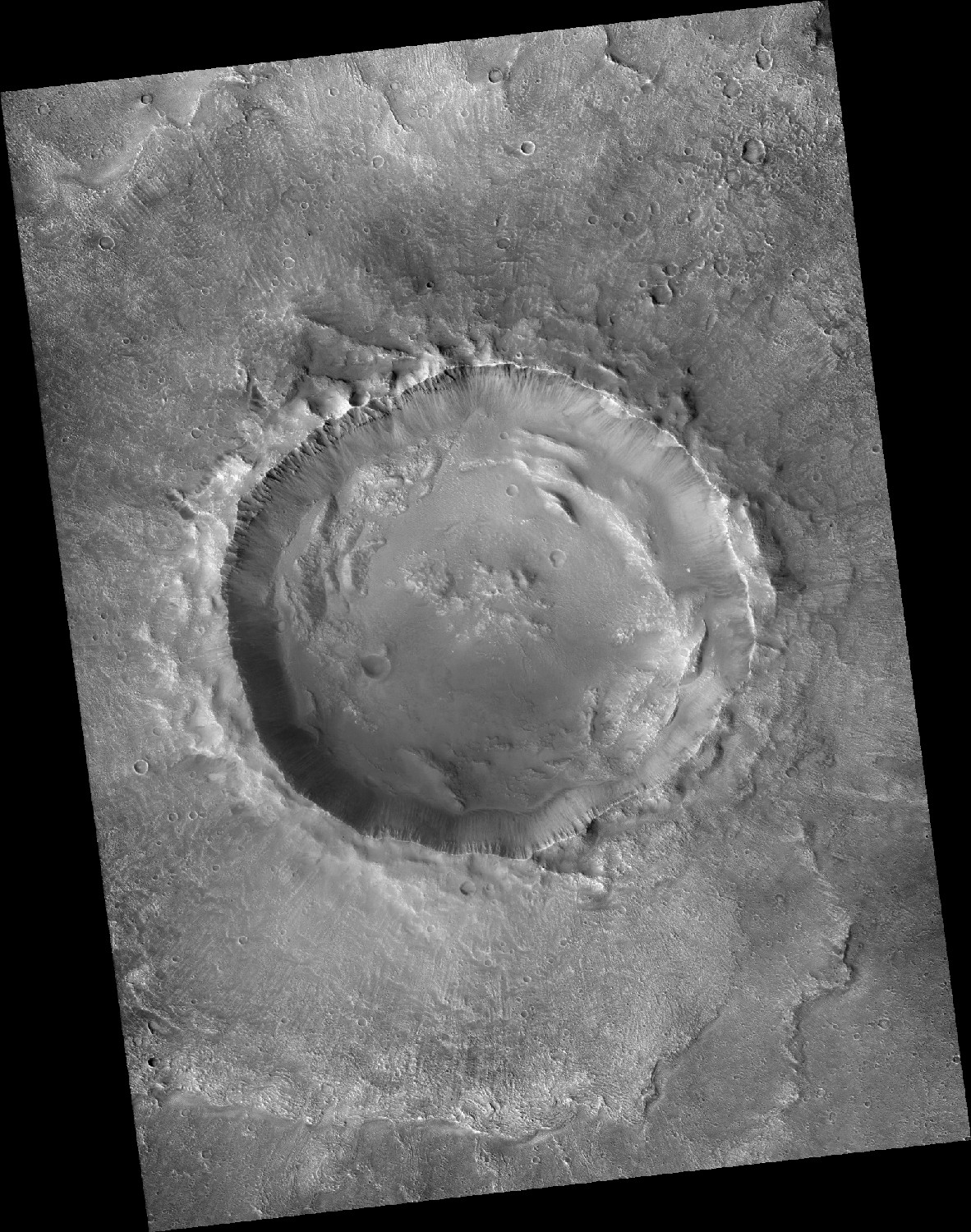
CTX image (MRO)

Tarsus is an impact crater in the Oxia Palus quadrangle of Mars. It is 18.55 kilometres (11.53 mi) in diameter and was named by the IAU in 1976 after the city of Tarsus, Turkey.

Tarsus is an example of a crater with layered ejecta, where upper lobes of ejecta, each with distinct ramparts at their margin, overlie older lobes.

Tarsus is located in Chryse Planitia, north of the crater Taxco and east of Naar.
