= Shapeshifting =

Ability to physically transform in mythology, folklore and speculative fiction

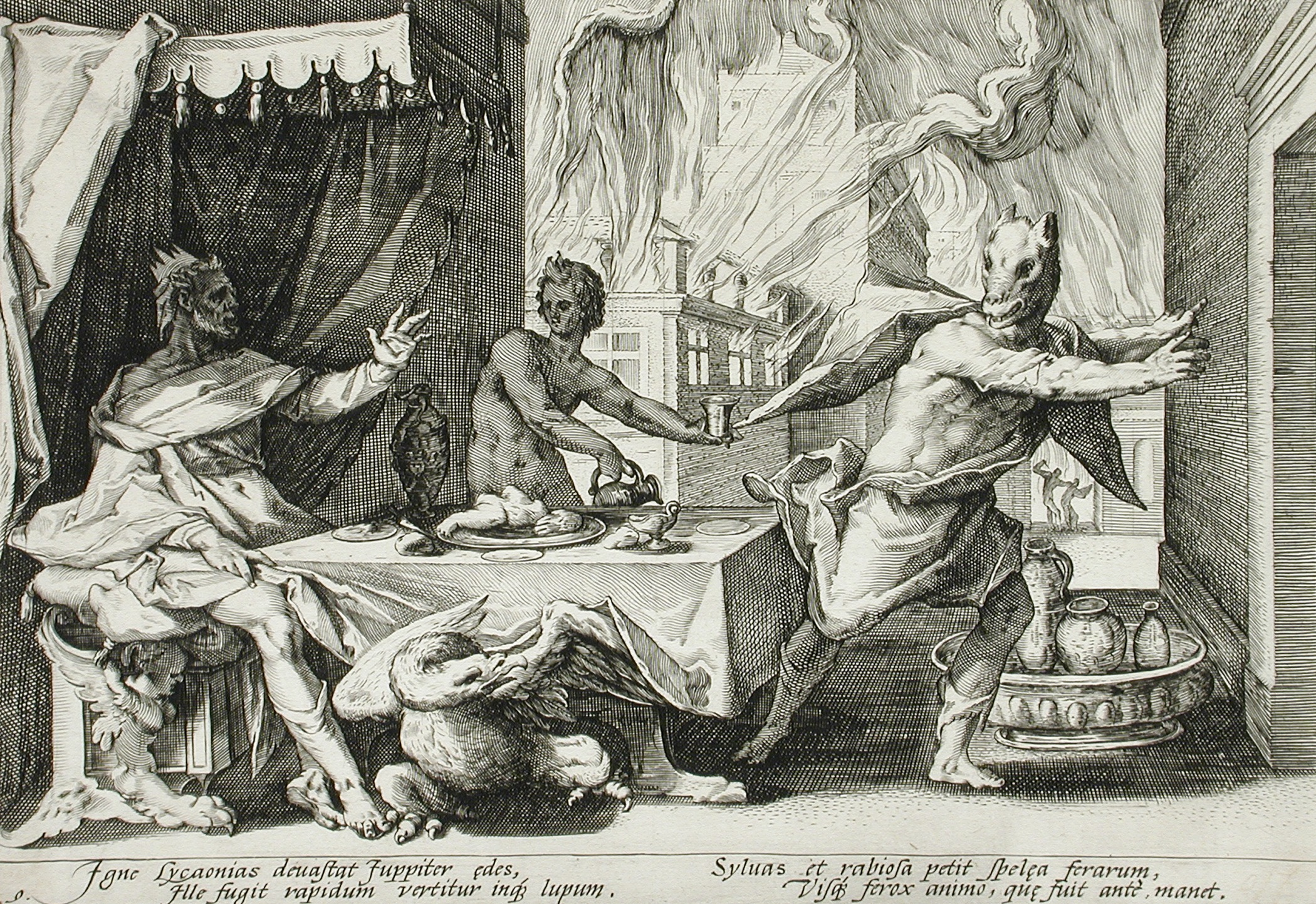
Zeus turning Lycaon into a wolf, engraving by Hendrik Goltzius

In mythology and fiction, shapeshifting is the ability to physically transform oneself through unnatural means. The idea of shapeshifting is found in the oldest forms of totemism and shamanism, as well as the oldest existent literature and epic poems such as the Epic of Gilgamesh and the Iliad. The concept remains a common literary device in modern fantasy, children's literature and popular culture. Examples of shape-shifters include changelings, jinns, kitsune, vampires, and werewolves, along with deities such as Loki and Vertumnus.

== Folklore, Mythology, and Religion ==
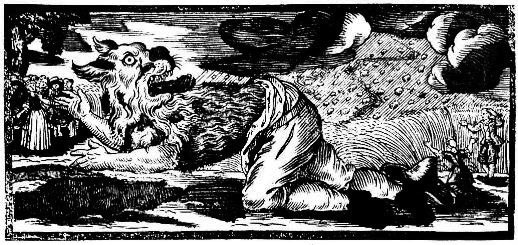
1722 German woodcut of a werewolf transforming

The popular shapeshifting creatures in folklore include werewolves and vampires (mostly of European, Canadian, and Native American/early American origin), ichchhadhari naag (shape-shifting cobra) of India, shapeshifting fox spirits of East Asia such as the huli jing of China, the obake of Japan, the Navajo skin-walkers, and gods, goddesses and demons and demonesses such as the Norse Loki or the Greek Proteus. Shapeshifting to the form of a wolf is specifically known as lycanthropy, and creatures who undergo such change are called lycanthropes. It was also common for deities to transform mortals into animals and plants.

The prefix "were-" comes from the Old English word for "man".

While the popular idea of a shapeshifter is of a human being who turns into something else, there are numerous stories about animals that can transform themselves as well.

=== Greco-Roman ===
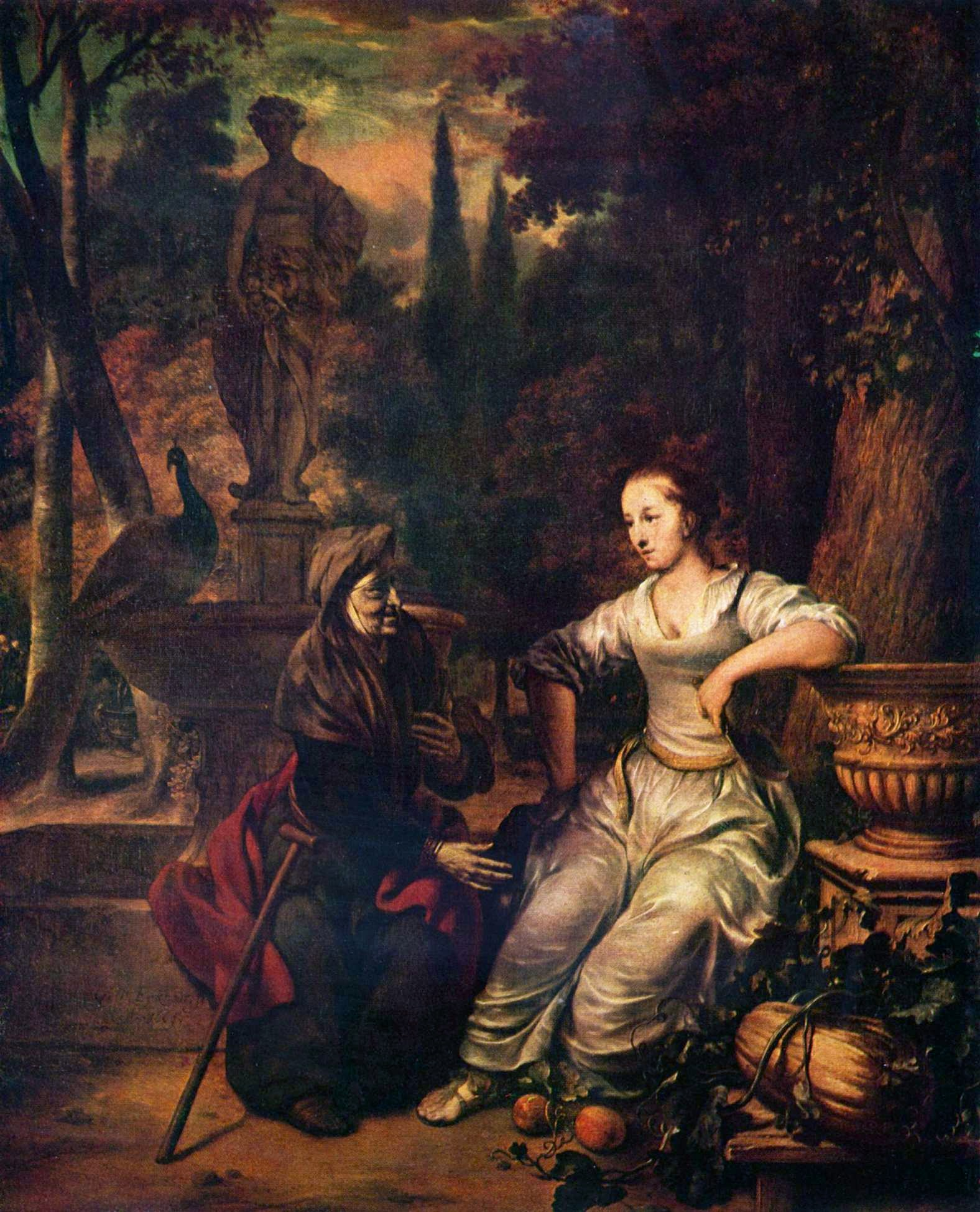
Vertumnus, in the form of an old woman, wooing Pomona, by Gerbrand van den Eeckhout.

Examples of shapeshifting in classical literature include many examples in Ovid's Metamorphoses, Circe's transforming of Odysseus's men to pigs in Homer's The Odyssey, and Apuleius's Lucius becoming a donkey in The Golden Ass. Proteus was known among the gods for his shapeshifting; both Menelaus and Aristaeus captured him to obtain information, and they succeeded only by holding on through his many transformations. Nereus told Heracles where to find the Apples of the Hesperides for the same reason.

The Oceanid Metis, the first wife of Zeus and the mother of the goddess Athena, was believed to be able to change her appearance into anything she wanted. In one story, her pride led Zeus to trick her into transforming into a fly. He then swallowed her because he feared that he and Metis would have a son who would be more powerful than Zeus himself. Metis, however, was already pregnant. She stayed alive inside his head and built an armor for her daughter. The banging of her metalworking made Zeus have a headache, so Hephaestus clove his head with an axe. Athena sprang from her father's head, fully grown, and in battle armor.

In Greek mythology, the transformation is often a punishment from the gods to humans who crossed them.

- Zeus transformed King Lycaon and his children into wolves (hence lycanthropy) as a punishment for either killing Zeus's children or serving him the flesh of Lycaon's own murdered son Nyctimus, depending on the exact version of the myth.
- Ares assigned Alectryon to keep watch for Helios the sun god during his affair with Aphrodite, but Alectryon fell asleep, leading to their discovery and humiliation that morning. Ares turned Alectryon into a rooster, which always crows to signal the morning and the arrival of the sun.
- Demeter transformed Ascalabus into a lizard for mocking her sorrow and thirst during her search for her daughter Persephone. She also turned King Lyncus into a lynx for trying to murder her prophet Triptolemus.
- Athena transformed Arachne into a spider (hence arachnid) for challenging her as a weaver and/or weaving a tapestry that insulted the gods. She also turned Nyctimene into an owl, though in this case it was an act of mercy, as the girl wished to hide from the daylight out of shame of being raped by her father.
- Artemis transformed Actaeon into a stag for spying on her bathing, and he was later devoured by his hunting dogs.
- Galanthis was transformed into a weasel or cat after interfering in Hera's plans to hinder the birth of Heracles.
- Atalanta and Hippomenes were turned into lions after making love in a temple dedicated to Zeus or Cybele.
- Io was a priestess of Hera in Argos, a nymph who was raped by Zeus, who changed her into a heifer to escape detection.
- Hera punished young Tiresias by transforming him into a woman and, seven years later, back into a man.
- King Tereus, his wife Procne, and her sister Philomela were all turned into birds (a hoopoe, a swallow and a nightingale respectively), after Tereus raped Philomela and cut out her tongue. In revenge she and Procne served him the flesh of his murdered son Itys (who in some variants is resurrected as a goldfinch).
- Callisto was turned into a bear by either Artemis or Hera for being impregnated by Zeus.
- Selene transformed Myia into a fly when she became a rival for the love of Endymion.

While the Greek gods could use transformation punitively — such as Medusa, who turned to a monster for having sexual intercourse (raped in Ovid's version) with Poseidon in Athena's temple. Even more frequently, the tales using it are of amorous adventure. Zeus repeatedly transformed himself to approach mortals as a means of gaining access:

- Danaë as a shower of gold
- Europa as a bull
- Leda as a swan
- Ganymede, as an eagle
- Alcmene as her husband Amphitryon
- Hera as a cuckoo
- Aegina as an eagle or a flame
- Persephone as a serpent
- Io, as a cow
- Callisto as either Artemis or Apollo
- Nemesis (Goddess of retribution) transformed into a goose to escape Zeus' advances, but he turned into a swan. She later bore the egg in which Helen of Troy was found.

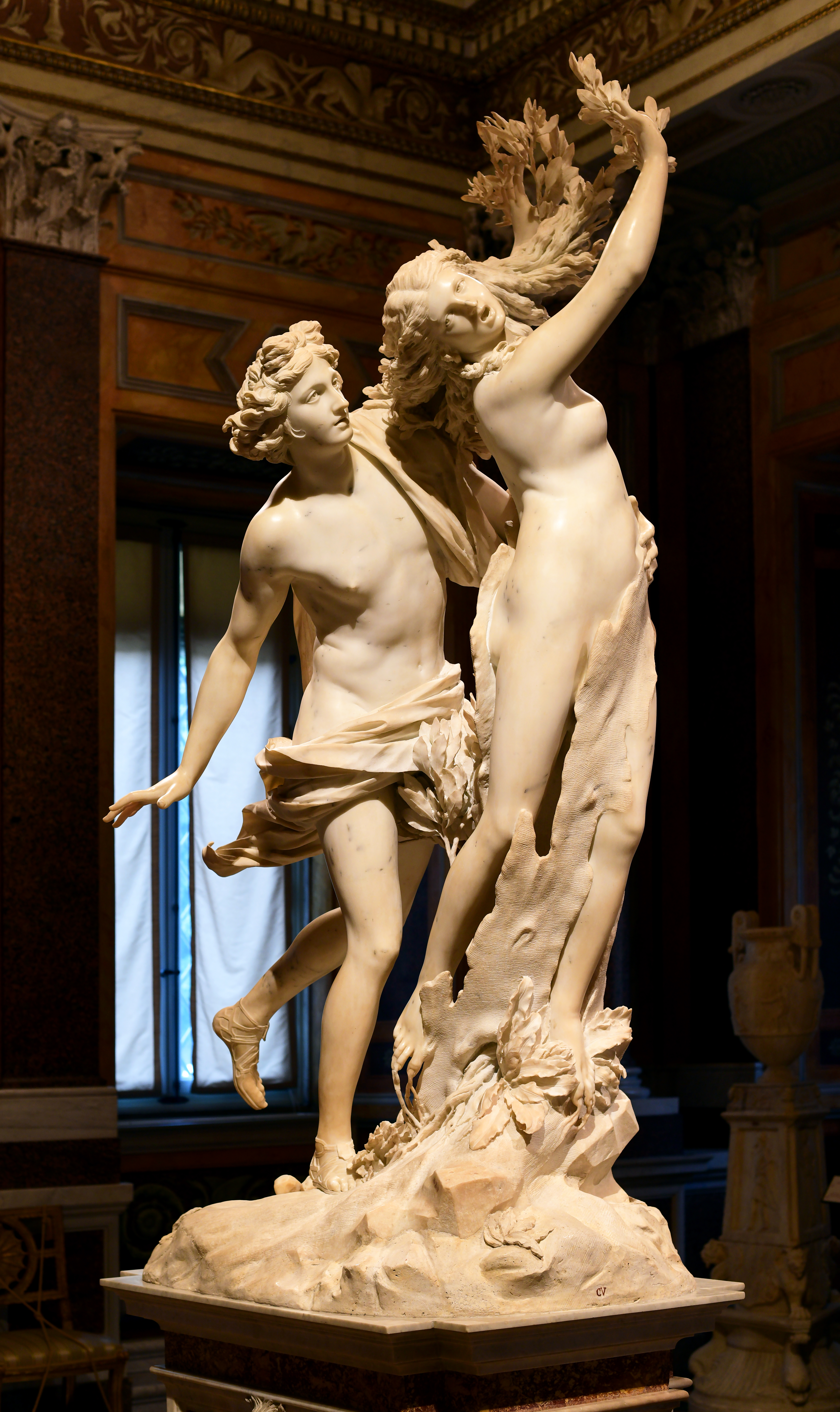
Gianlorenzo Bernini, Apollo pursuing an unwilling Daphne who transforms into a laurel tree

Vertumnus transformed himself into an old woman to gain entry to Pomona's orchard; there, he persuaded her to marry him.

In other tales, the woman appealed to other gods to protect her from rape, and was transformed (Daphne into laurel, Corone into a crow). Unlike Zeus and other gods' shapeshifting, these women were permanently metamorphosed.

In one tale, Demeter transformed herself into a mare to escape Poseidon, but Poseidon counter-transformed himself into a stallion to pursue her, and succeeded in the rape. Caenis, having been raped by Poseidon, demanded of him that she be changed to a man. He agreed, and she became Caeneus, a form he never lost, except, in some versions, upon death.

Clytie was a nymph who loved Helios, but he did not love her back. Desperate, she sat on a rock with no food or water for nine days looking at him as he crossed the skies, until she was transformed into a purple, sun-gazing flower, the heliotropium.

As a final reward from the gods for their hospitality, Baucis and Philemon were transformed, at their deaths, into a pair of trees.

Eos, the goddess of the dawn, secured immortality for her lover the Trojan prince Tithonus, but not eternal youth, so he aged without dying as he shriveled and grew more and more helpless. In the end, Eos transformed him into a cicada.

In some variants of the tale of Narcissus, he is turned into a narcissus flower.

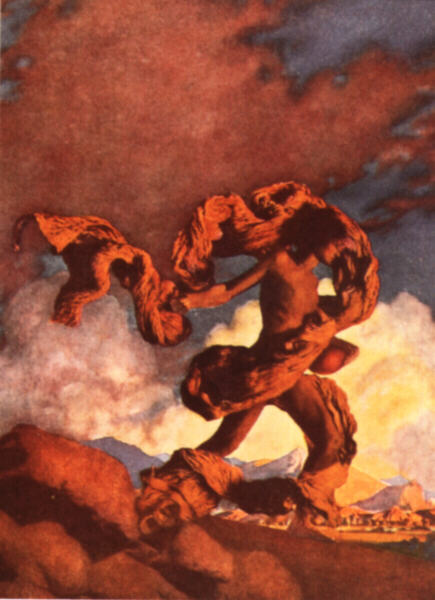
"Cadmus Sowing the Dragon's Teeth" by Maxfield Parrish

Sometimes metamorphoses transform objects into humans. In the myths of both Jason and Cadmus, one task set to the hero was to sow dragon's teeth; on being sown, they would metamorphose into belligerent warriors, and both heroes had to throw a rock to trick them into fighting each other to survive. Deucalion and Pyrrha repopulated the world after a flood by throwing stones behind them; they were transformed into people. Cadmus is also often known to have transformed into a dragon or serpent towards the end of his life. Pygmalion fell in love with Galatea, a statue he had made. Aphrodite had pity on him and transformed the stone into a living woman.

=== British and Irish ===
Fairies, witches, and wizards were all noted for their shape-shifting ability. Not all fairies could shape-shift, some having only the appearance of shape-shifting, through their power, called "glamour", to create illusions, and some were limited to changing their size, as with the spriggans, and others to a few forms. But others, such as the Hedley Kow, could change to many forms, and both human and supernatural wizards were capable of both such changes, and inflicting them on others.

Witches could turn into hares and in that form steal milk and butter.

Many British fairy tales, such as Jack the Giant Killer and The Black Bull of Norroway, feature shapeshifting.

==== Celtic mythology ====
Pwyll was transformed by Arawn into Arawn's shape, and Arawn transformed himself into Pwyll's so that they could trade places for a year and a day.

Llwyd ap Cil Coed transformed his wife and attendants into mice to attack a crop in revenge; when his wife is captured, he turns himself into three clergymen in succession to try to pay a ransom.

Math fab Mathonwy and Gwydion transform flowers into a woman named Blodeuwedd, and when she betrays her husband Lleu Llaw Gyffes, who is transformed into an eagle, they transform her again, into an owl.

Gilfaethwy raped Goewin, Math fab Mathonwy's virgin footholder, with help from his brother Gwydion. As punishment, Math turned them into different types of animals for one year each. Gwydion was transformed into a stag, sow, and wolf, and Gilfaethwy into a hind, boar, and she-wolf. Each year, they had a child. Math turned the three young animals into boys.

Gwion, having accidentally taken the wisdom from a potion that Ceridwen was brewing for her son, fled from her through a succession of changes, which she answered with changes of her own. This ended when he turned into a grain of corn and she turned into a hen and ate him. She became pregnant, and he was reborn as a baby. He grew up to be the bard Taliesin. In the Book of Taliesin, he mentions many forms which he is able to take, including that of lantern-light.

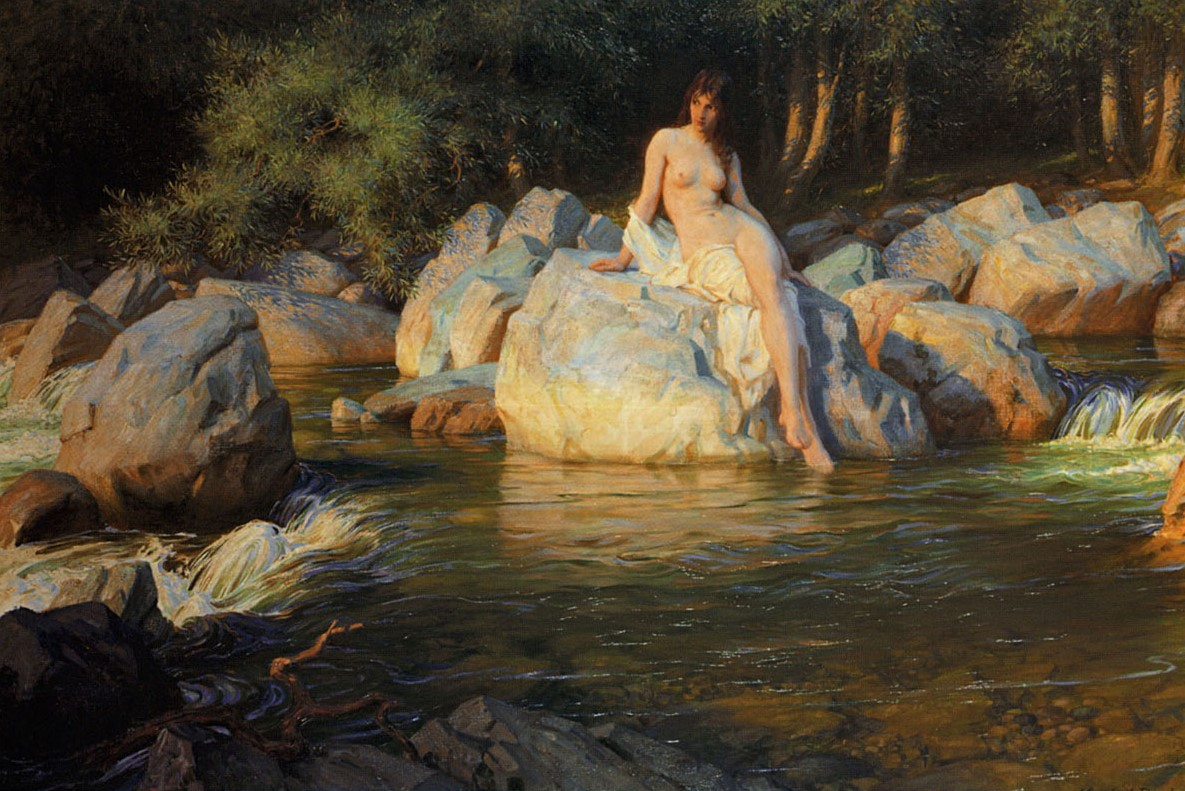
Kelpie by Herbert James Draper: transformed into a human

Tales abound about the selkie, a seal that can remove its skin to make contact in human guise with people for only a short amount of time before it must return to the sea. Clan MacColdrum of Uist's foundation myths include a union between the founder of the clan and a shape-shifting selkie. Another such creature is the Scottish selkie, which needs its sealskin to regain its form. In The Great Silkie of Sule Skerry the (male) selkie seduces a human woman. Such stories surrounding these creatures are usually romantic tragedies.

Scottish mythology features shapeshifters, which allows the various creatures to trick, deceive, hunt, and kill humans. Water spirits such as the each-uisge, which inhabit lochs and waterways in Scotland, were said to appear as a horse or a young man. Other tales include kelpies who emerge from lochs and rivers in the disguise of a horse or woman to ensnare and kill weary travelers. Tam Lin, a man captured by the Queen of the Fairies is changed into all manner of beasts before being rescued. He finally turned into a burning coal and was thrown into a well, whereupon he reappeared in his human form. The motif of capturing a person by holding him through all forms of transformation is a common thread in folktales.

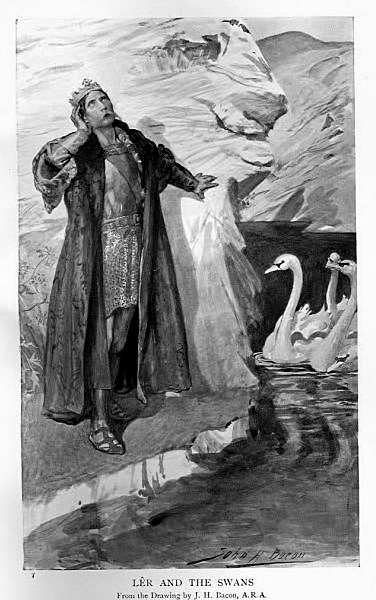
The Children of Lir, transformed into swans in Irish tales

Perhaps the best-known Irish myth is that of Aoife who turned her stepchildren, the Children of Lir, into swans to be rid of them. Likewise, in the Tochmarc Étaíne, Fuamnach jealously turns Étaín into a butterfly. The most dramatic example of shapeshifting in Irish myth is that of Tuan mac Cairill, the only survivor of Partholón's settlement of Ireland. In his centuries-long life, he became successively a stag, a wild boar, a hawk, and finally a salmon before being eaten and (as in the Wooing of Étaín) reborn as a human.

The Púca is a Celtic faery, and also a deft shapeshifter. He can transform into many different, terrifying forms.

Sadhbh, the wife of the famous hero Fionn mac Cumhaill, was changed into a deer by the druid Fer Doirich when she spurned his amorous interests.

=== Norse and Teutonic ===
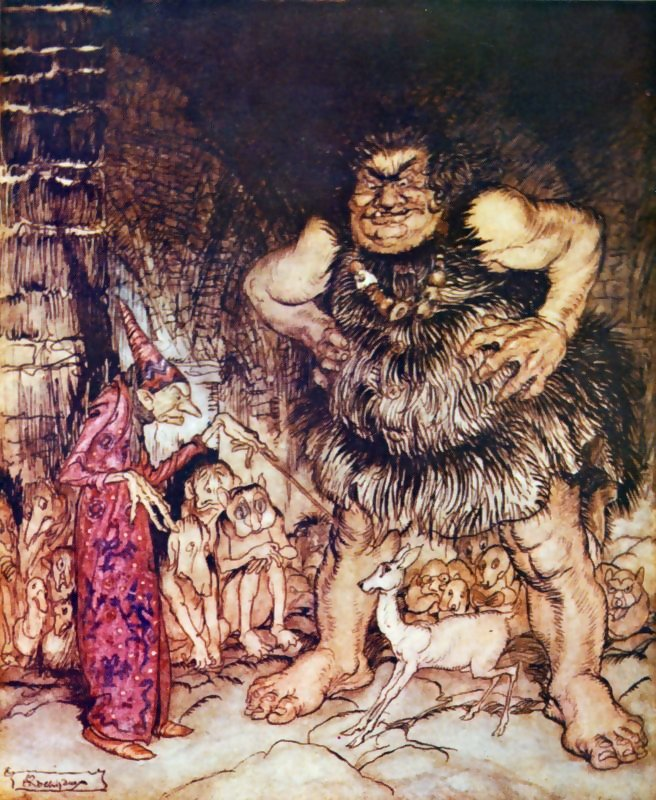
"The giant Galligantua and the wicked old magician transform the duke's daughter into a white hind." by Arthur Rackham

There is a significant amount of literature about shapeshifters that appear in a variety of Norse tales.

In the Lokasenna, Odin and Loki taunt each other with having taken the form of females and nursing offspring to which they had given birth. A 13th-century Edda relates Loki taking the form of a mare to bear Odin's steed Sleipnir which was the fastest horse ever to exist, and also the form of a she-wolf to bear Fenrir.

Svipdagr angered Odin, who turned him into a dragon. Despite his monstrous appearance, his lover, the goddess Freyja, refused to leave his side. When the warrior Hadding found and slew Svipdagr, Freyja cursed him to be tormented by a tempest and shunned like the plague wherever he went. In the Hyndluljóð, Freyja transformed her protégé Óttar into a boar to conceal him. She also possessed a cloak of falcon feathers that allowed her to transform into a falcon, which Loki borrowed on occasion.

The Volsunga saga contains many shapeshifting characters. Siggeir's mother changed into a wolf to help torture his defeated brothers-in-law with slow and ignominious deaths. When one, Sigmund, survived, he and his nephew and son Sinfjötli killed men wearing wolfskins; when they donned the skins themselves, they were cursed to become werewolves.

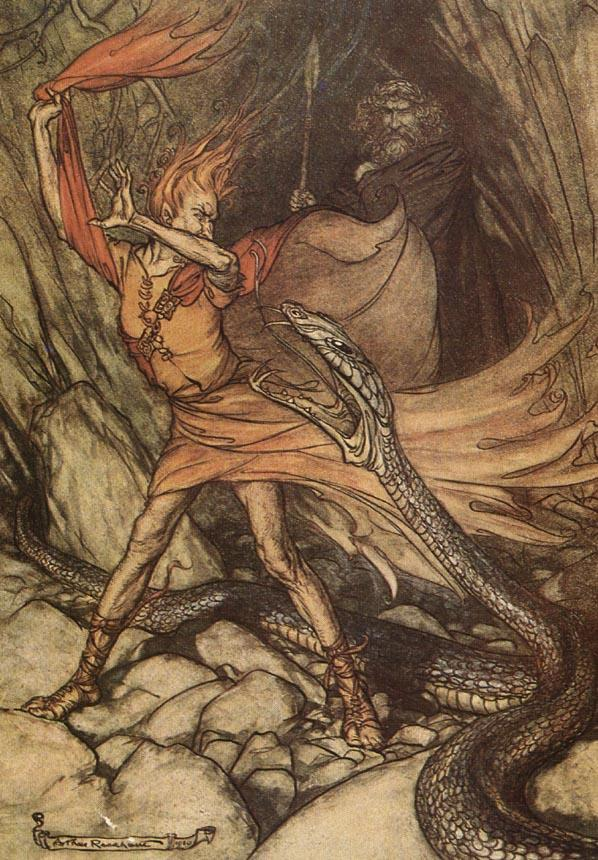
Loge feigns fear as Alberich turns into a giant snake. Wotan stands in the background; illustration by Arthur Rackham to Richard Wagner's Das Rheingold

The dwarf Andvari is described as being able to magically turn into a pike. Alberich, his counterpart in Richard Wagner's Der Ring des Nibelungen, using the Tarnhelm, takes on many forms, including a giant serpent and a toad, in a failed attempt to impress or intimidate Loki and Odin/Wotan.

Fafnir was originally a dwarf, a giant, or even a human, depending on the exact myth, but in all variants, he transformed into a dragon—a symbol of greed—while guarding his ill-gotten hoard. His brother, Ótr, enjoyed spending time as an otter, which led to his accidental slaying by Loki.

In Scandinavia, there existed, for example, the famous race of she-werewolves known by the name of Maras, women who took on the appearance of huge half-human and half-wolf monsters that stalked the night in search of human or animal prey. If a woman gives birth at midnight and stretches the membrane that envelopes the child when it is brought forth, between four sticks and creeps through it, naked, she will bear children without pain; but all the boys will be shamans, and all the girls Maras.

The Nisse is sometimes said to be a shapeshifter. This trait also is attributed to Hulder.

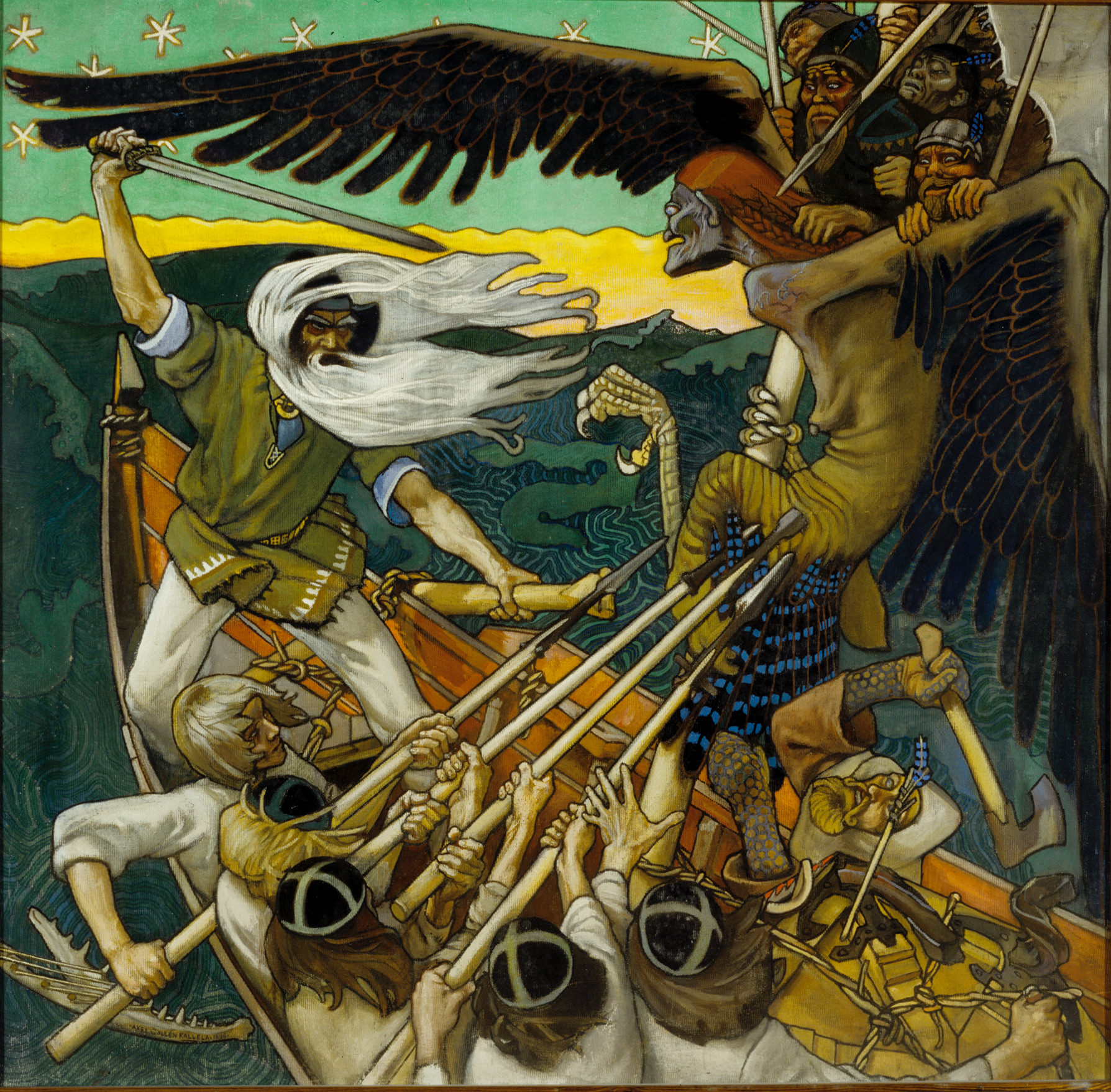
Louhi, Mistress of the North, attacking Väinämöinen in the form of a giant eagle with her troops on her back as she tries to steal Sampo; in the Finnish epic poetry Kalevala by Elias Lönnrot. (The Defense of the Sampo, Akseli Gallen-Kallela, 1896)

Gunnhild, Mother of Kings (Gunnhild konungamóðir) (c. 910 – c. 980), a quasi-historical figure who appears in the Icelandic Sagas, according to which she was the wife of Eric Bloodaxe, was credited with magic powers – including the power of shapeshifting and turning at will into a bird. She is the central character of the novel Mother of Kings by Poul Anderson, which considerably elaborates on her shapeshifting abilities.

In the Finnish epic poem Kalevala of ancient folklore, Louhi, Mistress of the North, attacks Väinämöinen in the form of a giant eagle with her troops on her back as he tries to steal Sampo.

=== Indian ===
- Ichchhadhari naag: A common male cobra will become an ichchhadhari naag and a common female cobra will become an ichchhadhari naagin after 100 years of tapasya (penance). After being blessed by Lord Shiva, they attain a human form of their own and have the ability to shapeshift into any living creature, they can live for more than a hundred years without getting old.
- Yoginis were associated with the power of shapeshifting into female animals.
- In the Indian fable The Dog Bride from Folklore of the Santal Parganas by Cecil Henry Bompas, a buffalo herder falls in love with a dog that has the power to turn into a woman when she bathes.
- In Kerala, there was a legend about the Odiyan clan, who in Kerala folklore are men believed to possess shapeshifting abilities and can assume animal forms. Odiyans are said to have inhabited the Malabar region of Kerala before the widespread use of electricity.

=== Armenian ===
In Armenian mythology, shapeshifters include the Nhang, a serpentine river monster that can transform itself into a woman or seal, and will drown humans and then drink their blood; or the beneficial Shahapet, a guardian spirit that can appear either as a man or a snake.

=== Philippines ===
Philippine mythology includes the Aswang, a vampiric monster capable of transforming into a bat, a large black dog, a black cat, a black boar, or some other form to stalk humans at night. The folklore also mentions other beings such as the Kapre, the Tikbalang, and the Engkanto, which change their appearances to woo beautiful maidens. Also, talismans (called "anting-anting" or "birtud" in the local dialect), can give their owners the ability to shapeshift. In one tale, Chonguita the Monkey Wife, a woman is turned into a monkey, only becoming human again if she can marry a handsome man.

=== Tatar ===
Tatar folklore includes Yuxa, a hundred-year-old snake that can transform itself into a beautiful young woman, and seeks to marry men to have children.

=== Chinese ===
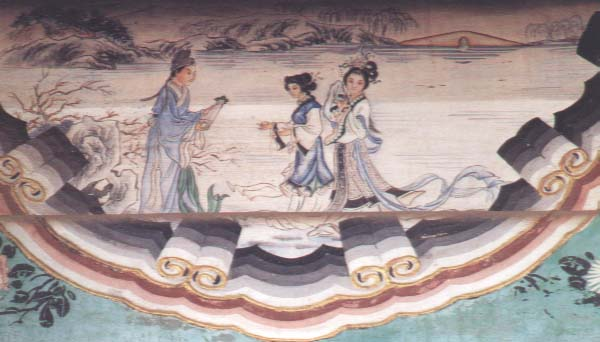
"Madame White Snake" Picture on long veranda in the Summer Palace, Beijing, China

Chinese mythology contains many tales of animal shapeshifters, capable of taking on human form. The most common such shapeshifter is the huli jing, a fox spirit that usually appears as a beautiful young woman; most are dangerous, but some feature as the heroines of love stories. Madame White Snake is one such legend; a snake falls in love with a man, and the story recounts the trials she and her husband faced.

=== Japanese ===
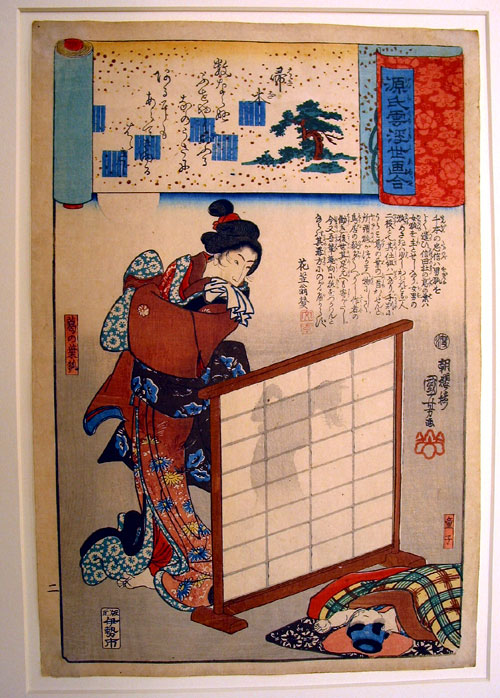
Kuzunoha the fox woman, casting a fox shadow

In Japanese folklore obake are a type of yōkai with the ability to shapeshifting. The fox, or kitsune is among the most commonly known, but other such creatures include the bakeneko, the mujina, and the tanuki.

=== Korean ===
Korean mythology also contains a fox with the ability to shapeshift. Unlike its Chinese and Japanese counterparts, the kumiho is typically always malevolent. Usually its form is of a beautiful young woman; one tale recounts a man, a would-be seducer, revealed as a kumiho. The kumiho has nine tails and as she desires to be a full human, she uses her beauty to seduce men and eat their hearts (or in some cases livers where the belief is that 100 livers would turn her into a real human).

=== Somali ===
In Somali mythology Qori ismaris ("One who rubs himself with a stick") was a man who could transform himself into a "Hyena-man" by rubbing himself with a magic stick at nightfall and by repeating this process could return to his human state before dawn.

=== Southern Africa ===
ǀKaggen is a demiurge and folk hero of the ǀXam people of southern Africa. He is a trickster god who can shape shift, usually taking the form of a praying mantis but also a bull eland, a louse, a snake, and a caterpillar.

=== Indigenous American ===
A Pukwudgie is a human-like creature from Wampanoag folklore said to appear and disappear at will, and shapeshift.

=== South American ===
Amazon river dolphins, known by the natives as the boto, encantados or toninhas, are very prevalent in the mythology of the native South Americans. They are frequently characterized in mythology with superior musical ability, seductiveness and love of sex, resulting in illegitimate children, and attraction to parties. Despite the fact that the Encante are said to come from a utopia full of wealth which is also without pain or death, they crave the pleasures and hardships of human societies.

Transformation into human form is said to be rare, and usually occurs at night. The encantado will often be seen running from a festa, despite protests from the others for it to stay, and can be seen by pursuers as it hurries to the river and reverts to dolphin form. When it is under human form, it wears a hat to hide its blowhole, which does not disappear with the shapeshift.

Besides the ability to shapeshift into human form, encantados frequently wield other magical abilities, such as controlling storms, hypnotizing humans into doing their will, transforming humans into encantados, and inflicting illness, insanity, and even death. Shamans often intervene in these situations.

Along with shapeshifting, kidnapping is also a common theme in such folklore. Encantados are said to be fond of abducting humans with whom they fall in love, children born of their illicit love affairs, or just about anyone near the river who can keep them company, and taking them back to the Encante. The fear of this is so great among people who live near the Amazon River that both children and adults are terrified of going near the water between dusk and dawn, or entering water alone. Some who supposedly have encountered encantados while out in their canoes have been said to have gone insane, but the creatures seem to have done little more than follow their boats and nudge them from time to time. The myth is suggested to have arisen in part because dolphin genitalia bear a resemblance to those of humans. Others believe the myth served (and still serves) as a way of hiding the incestuous relations which are quite common in some small, isolated communities along the river. Legend also states that "if a person makes eye contact with an Amazon river dolphin, they will have lifelong nightmares".

=== Trinidad and Tobago ===
The Ligahoo or loup-garou is the shapeshifter of Trinidad and Tobago's folklore. This unique ability is believed to be handed down in some old creole families, and is usually associated with witch-doctors and practitioners of African magic.

=== Mapuche (Argentina and Chile) ===
The name of the Nahuel Huapi Lake in Argentina derives from the toponym of its major island in Mapudungun (Mapuche language): "Island of the Jaguar (or Puma)", from nahuel, "puma (or jaguar)", and huapí, "island". There is, however, more to the word "Nahuel" – it can also signify "a man who by sorcery has been transformed into a puma" (or jaguar).

=== Slavic mythology ===
In Slavic mythology, one of the main gods Veles was a shapeshifting god of animals, magic and the underworld. He was often represented as a bear, wolf, snake or owl. He also became a dragon while fighting Perun, the Slavic storm god.

=== Folktales ===
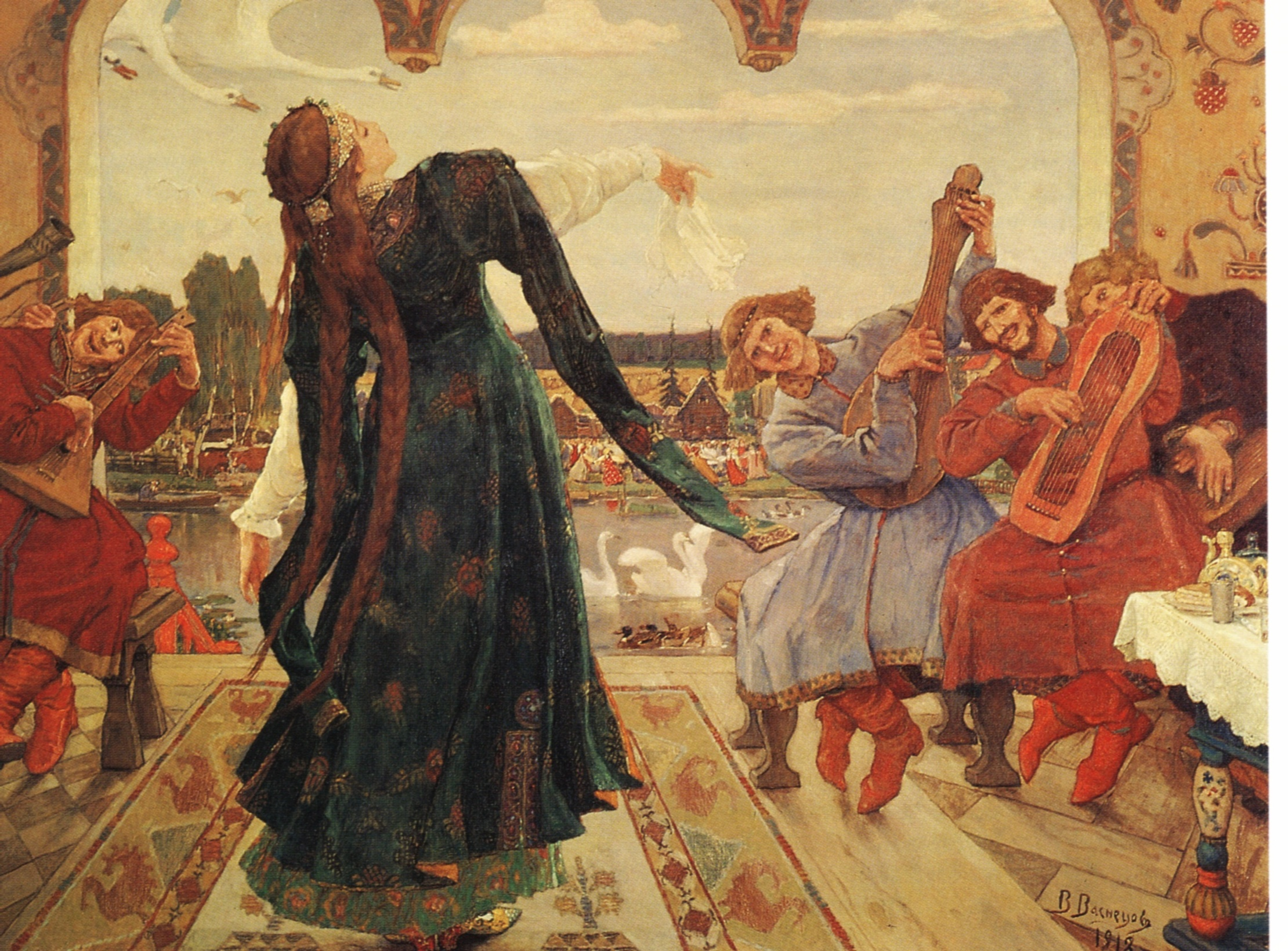
Tsarevna Frog (or The Frog Princess), by Viktor Vasnetsov, tells of a frog that metamorphoses into a princess.

- In the Finnish tale The Magic Bird, three young sorceresses attempt to murder a man who keeps reviving. His revenge is to turn them into three black mares and have them harnessed to heavy loads until he is satisfied.
- In The Laidly Worm of Spindleston Heugh, a Northumbrian legend from about the thirteenth century, Princess Margaret of Bamburgh is transformed into a dragon by her stepmother; her motive sprung, like Snow White's stepmother's, from the comparison of their beauty.
- In Child ballad 35, "Allison Gross", the title witch turns a man into a wyrm for refusing to be her lover. This is a motif found in many legends and folktales.
- In the German tale The Frog's Bridegroom, recorded by folklorist and ethnographer Gustav Jungbauer, the third of three sons of a farmer, Hansl, is forced to marry a frog, which eventually turns out to be a beautiful woman transformed by a spell.
- In some variants of the fairy tales, both The Frog Prince or more commonly The Frog Princess and Beast, of Beauty and the Beast, are transformed as a form of punishment for some transgression. Both are restored to their true forms after earning a human's love despite their appearance.
- In the most famous Lithuanian folk tale Eglė the Queen of Serpents, Eglė irreversibly transforms her children and herself into trees as a punishment for betrayal while her husband is able to reversibly morph into a serpent at will.
- In East of the Sun and West of the Moon, the hero is transformed into a bear by his wicked stepmother, who wishes to force him to marry her daughter.
- In The Marmot Queen by Italo Calvino, a Spanish queen is turned into a rodent by Morgan le Fay.
- In The Mare of the Necromancer, a Turin Italian tale by Guido Gozzano, the Princess of Corelandia is turned into a horse by the baron necromancer for refusing to marry him. Only the love and intelligence of Candido save the princess from the spell.
- The White Doe, a French tale written by Madame d'Aulnoy, describes the transformation of Princess Desiree into a doe by a jealous fairy.
- From a Croatian book of tales, Sixty Folk-Tales from Exclusively Slavonic Sources by A. H. Wratislaw, the fable entitled "The she-wolf" tells of a huge she-wolf with a habit of turning into a woman from time to time by taking off her skin. One day a man witnesses the transformation, steals her pelt and marries her.
- The Merchant's Sons is a Finnish story of two brothers, one of whom tries to win the hand of the tsar's wicked daughter. The girl does not like her suitor and endeavors to have him killed, but he turns her into a beautiful mare which he and his brother ride. In the end he turns her back into a girl and marries her.
- In Dapplegrim, if the youth found the transformed princess twice, and hid from her twice, they would marry.
- In literary fairy tale The Beggar Princess, to save her beloved prince, Princess Yvonne fulfills the tasks of cruel king Ironheart and is changed into an old woman.
- Journey to the West, one of China's Four Great Classical Novels, greatly features shapeshifting, as many gods, demons, and other mythical beings are capable of the act. The most famous case would be the Monkey King, a mischievous trickster who often utilizes his power of 72 transformations to thwart his foes.

== Themes ==
Shapeshifting may be used as a plot device, may also include symbolic significance. For example, the Beast's transformation in Beauty and the Beast indicates Belle's ability to accept him despite his appearance. When a form is taken on involuntarily, the thematic effect can be one of confinement and restraint; the person is bound to the new form. In extreme cases, such as petrifaction, the character is entirely disabled. On the other hand, voluntary shapeshifting can be a means of escape and liberation. Even when the form is not undertaken to resemble a literal escape, the abilities specific to the form allow the character to act in a manner that was previously impossible.

Examples of this are in fairy tales. A prince who is forced into a bear's shape (as in East of the Sun and West of the Moon) is a prisoner, but a princess who takes on a bear's shape voluntarily to flee a situation (as in The She-Bear) escapes with her new shape. In the Earthsea books, Ursula K. Le Guin depicts an animal form as slowly transforming the wizard's mind, so that the dolphin, bear or other creature forgets it was human, making it impossible to change back. This makes an example of a voluntary shapeshifting becoming an imprisoning metamorphosis. Beyond this, the uses of shapeshifting, transformation, and metamorphosis in fiction are as protean as the forms the characters take on.

=== Punitive changes ===
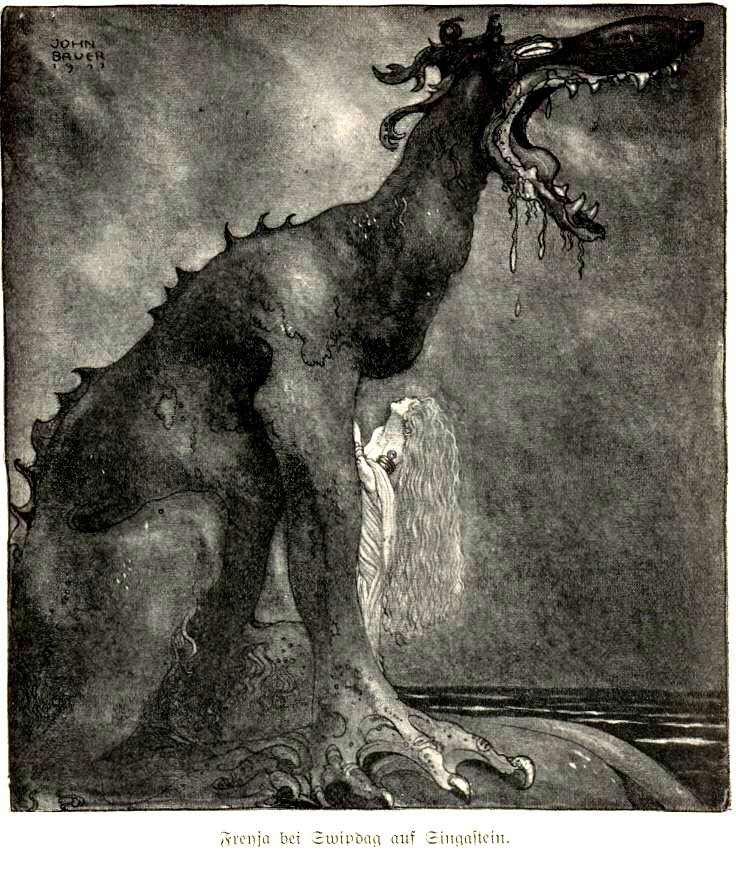
Svipdagr Transformed by John Bauer shows Svipdagr being turned into a dragon after angering Odin; but despite his monstrous appearance, his lover, the goddess Freyja, refused to leave his side.

In many cases, imposed forms are punitive. This may be a just punishment, the nature of the transformation matching the crime for which it occurs; in other cases, the form is unjustly imposed by an angry and powerful person. In fairy tales, such transformations are usually temporary, but they commonly appear as the resolution of myths (as in many of the Metamorphoses) or produce origin myths.

=== Transformation chase ===
In many fairy tales and ballads, as in Child Ballad #44, The Twa Magicians or Farmer Weathersky, a magical chase occurs where the pursued endlessly takes on forms in an effort to shake off the pursuer, and the pursuer answers with shapeshifting, as, a dove is answered with a hawk and a hare with a greyhound. The pursued may finally succeed in escape or the pursuer in capturing.

The Grimm Brothers' fairy tale Foundling-Bird contains this as the bulk of the plot. In the Italian Campania Fables collection of Pentamerone by Gianbattista Basile, tells of a Neapolitan princess who, to escape from her father who had imprisoned her, becomes a huge she-bear. The magic happens due to a potion given to her by an old witch. The girl, once gone, can regain her human aspect.

In other variants, the pursued may transform various objects into obstacles, as in the fairy tale "The Master Maid", where the Master Maid transforms a wooden comb into a forest, a lump of salt into a mountain, and a flask of water into a sea. In these tales, the pursued normally escapes after overcoming three obstacles. This obstacle chase is literally found worldwide, in many variants in every region.

In fairy tales of the Aarne–Thompson type 313A, The Girl Helps the Hero Flee, such a chase is an integral part of the tale. It can be either a transformation chase (as in The Grateful Prince, King Kojata, Foundling-Bird, Jean, the Soldier, and Eulalie, the Devil's Daughter, or The Two Kings' Children) or an obstacle chase (as in The Battle of the Birds, The White Dove, or The Master Maid).

In a similar effect, a captive may shapeshift to break a hold on him. Proteus and Nereus's shapeshifting was to prevent heroes such as Menelaus and Heracles from forcing information from them. Tam Lin, once seized by Janet, was transformed by the faeries to keep Janet from taking him, but as he had advised her, she did not let go, and so freed him. The motif of capturing a person by holding him through many transformations is found in folktales throughout Europe, and Patricia A. McKillip references it in her Riddle-Master trilogy: a shape-shifting Earthmaster finally wins its freedom by startling the man holding it.

=== Powers ===
One motif is a shape change in order to obtain abilities in the new form. Berserkers were held to change into wolves and bears to fight more effectively. In many cultures, evil magicians could transform into animal shapes and thus skulk about.

In many fairy tales, the hero's talking animal helper proves to be a shapeshifted human being, able to help him in its animal form. In one variation, featured in The Three Enchanted Princes and The Death of Koschei the Deathless, the hero's three sisters have been married to animals. These prove to be shapeshifted men, who aid their brother-in-law in a variant of tale types.

=== Bildungsroman ===
Beauty and the Beast has been interpreted as a young woman's coming-of-age, in which she changes from being repulsed by sexual activity and regarding a husband therefore bestial, to a mature woman who can marry.

=== Needed items ===
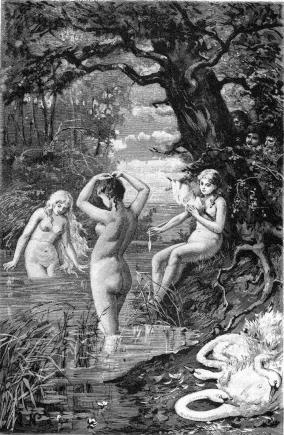
Valkyries as swan maidens, having shed their swan skins.

Some shapeshifters can change form only if they have some item, usually an article of clothing. In Bisclavret by Marie de France, a werewolf cannot regain human form without his clothing, but in wolf form does no harm to anyone. However, the most common use of this motif is in tales where a man steals the article and forces the shapeshifter, trapped in human form, to become his bride. This lasts until she discovers where he has hidden the article, and she can flee. Selkies feature in these tales. Others include swan maidens and the Japanese tennin.

Swedish writer Selma Lagerlöf, in The Wonderful Adventures of Nils, included a version of the story with the typical elements (fisherman sees mermaids dancing on an island and steals the sealskin of one of them, preventing her from becoming a seal again, so that he could marry her) and linked it to the founding of the city of Stockholm.

=== Inner conflict ===
The power to externally transform can symbolize an internal savagery; a central theme in many strands of werewolf mythology, and the inversion of the "liberation" theme, as in Dr Jekyll's transformation into Mr. Hyde.

=== Usurpation ===
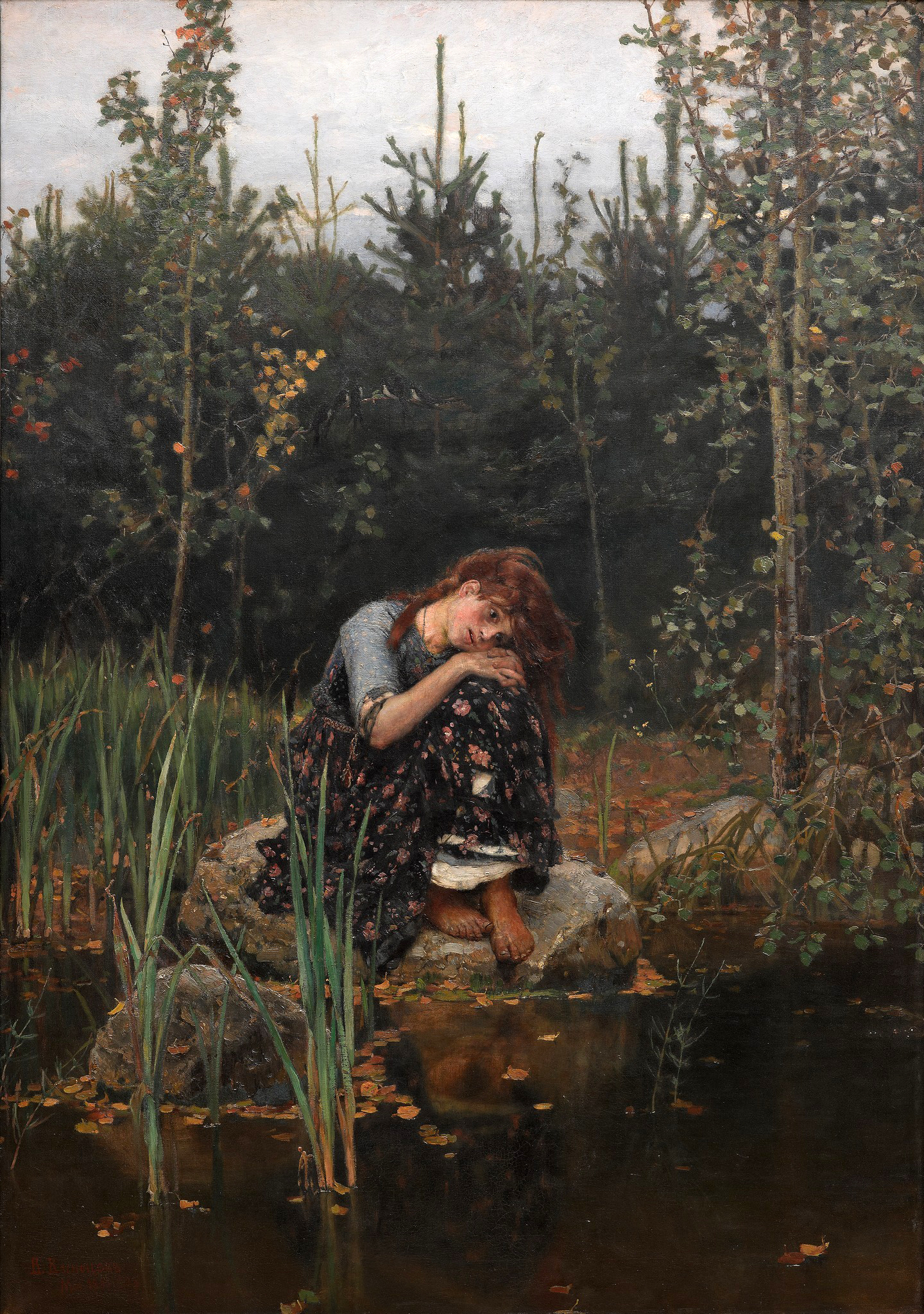
Sister Alenushka Weeping about Brother Ivanushka by Viktor Vasnetsov, Russian variant of Brother and Sister: Alenushka laments her brother's transformation into a goat.

Some transformations are performed to remove the victim from his place so that the transformer can usurp it. Bisclaveret's wife steals his clothing and traps him in wolf form because she has a lover. A witch, in The Wonderful Birch, changed a mother into a sheep to take her place, and had the mother slaughtered; when her stepdaughter married the king, the witch transformed her into a reindeer to put her daughter in the queen's place. In the Korean Transformation of the Kumiho, a kumiho, a fox with magical powers, transforms itself into an image of the bride, only being detected when her clothing is removed. In Brother and Sister, when two children flee from their cruel stepmother, she enchants the streams along the way to transform them. While the brother refrains from the first two, which threaten to turn them into tigers and wolves, he is too thirsty at the third, which turns him into a deer. The Six Swans are transformed into swans by their stepmother, as are the Children of Lir in Irish mythology.

=== Ill-advised wishes ===
Many fairy-tale characters have expressed ill-advised wishes to have any child at all, even one that has another form, and had such children born to them. At the end of the fairy tale, normally after marriage, such children metamorphose into human form. Hans My Hedgehog was born when his father wished for a child, even a hedgehog. Even stranger forms are possible: Giambattista Basile included in his Pentamerone the tale of a girl born as a sprig of myrtle, and Italo Calvino, in his Italian Folktales, a girl born as an apple.

Sometimes, the parent who wishes for a child is told how to gain one but does not obey the directions perfectly, resulting in a transformed birth. In Prince Lindworm, the woman eats two onions but does not peel one, resulting in her first child being a lindworm. In Tatterhood, a woman magically produces two flowers, but disobeys the directions to eat only the beautiful one, resulting in her having a beautiful and sweet daughter, but only after a disgusting and hideous one.

Less commonly, ill-advised wishes can transform a person after birth. The Seven Ravens are transformed when their father thinks his sons are playing instead of fetching water to christen their newborn and sickly sister, and curses them. In Puddocky, when three princes start to quarrel over the beautiful heroine, a witch curses her because of the noise.

=== Monstrous bride/bridegroom ===
Such wished-for children may become monstrous brides or bridegrooms. These tales have often been interpreted as symbolically representing arranged marriages; the bride's revulsion to marrying a stranger is symbolized by his bestial form.

The heroine must fall in love with the transformed groom. The hero or heroine must marry, as promised, and the monstrous form is removed by the wedding. Sir Gawain thus transformed the Loathly lady; although he was told that this was halfway, she could at his choice be beautiful by day and hideous by night, or vice versa, he told her that he would choose what she preferred, which broke the spell entirely. In Tatterhood, Tatterhood is transformed by her asking her bridegroom why he didn't ask her why she rode a goat, why she carried a spoon, and why she was so ugly, and when he asked her, denying it and therefore transforming her goat into a horse, her spoon into a fan, and herself into a beauty. Puddocky is transformed when her prince, after she had helped him with two other tasks, tells him that his father has sent him for a bride. A similar effect is found in Child ballad 34, Kemp Owyne, where the hero can transform a dragon back into a maiden by kissing her three times.

Sometimes the bridegroom removes his animal skin for the wedding night, whereupon it can be burned. Hans My Hedgehog, The Donkey and The Pig King fall under this grouping. At an extreme, in Prince Lindworm, the bride who avoids being eaten by the lindworm bridegroom arrives at her wedding wearing every gown she owns, and she tells the bridegroom she will remove one of hers if he removes one of his; only when her last gown comes off has he removed his last skin, and become a white shape that she can form into a man.

In some tales, the hero or heroine must obey a prohibition; the bride must spend a period not seeing the transformed groom in human shape (as in East of the Sun and West of the Moon), or the bridegroom must not burn the animals' skins. In The Brown Bear of Norway, The Golden Crab, The Enchanted Snake and some variants of The Frog Princess, burning the skin is a catastrophe, putting the transformed bride or bridegroom in danger. In these tales, the prohibition is broken, invariably, resulting in a separation and a search by one spouse for the other.

=== Death ===
Ghosts sometimes appear in animal form. In The Famous Flower of Serving-Men, the heroine's murdered husband appears to the king as a white dove, lamenting her fate over his own grave. In The White and the Black Bride and The Three Little Men in the Wood, the murdered – drowned – true bride reappears as a white duck. In The Rose Tree and The Juniper Tree, the murdered children become birds who avenge their own deaths. There are African folk tales of murder victims avenging themselves in the form of crocodiles that can shapeshift into human form.

In some fairy tales, the character can reveal himself in every new form, and so a usurper repeatedly kills the victim in every new form, as in Beauty and Pock Face, A String of Pearls Twined with Golden Flowers, and The Boys with the Golden Stars. This eventually leads to a form in which the character (or characters) can reveal the truth to someone able to stop the villain.

Similarly, the transformation back may be acts that would be fatal. In The Wounded Lion, the prescription for turning the lion back into a prince was to kill him, chop him to pieces, burn the pieces, and throw the ash into the water. Less drastic but no less fatal, the fox in The Golden Bird, the foals in The Seven Foals, and the cats in Lord Peter and The White Cat tell the heroes of those stories to cut off their heads; this restores them to human shape. In the Greek tale of Scylla, Scylla's father Nisus turns into an eagle after death and drowns her daughter for betraying her father.

== Modern ==
=== Fiction ===
- In George MacDonald's The Princess and Curdie (1883) Curdie is informed that many human beings, by their acts, are slowly turning into beasts. Curdie is given the power to detect the transformation before it is visible and is assisted by beasts that had been transformed and are working their way back to humanity.
- In Carlo Collodi's story The Adventures of Pinocchio (1883), the boys who visit the Land of Toys turn into donkeys.
- L. Frank Baum concluded The Marvelous Land of Oz (1904) with the revelation that Princess Ozma, sought by the protagonists, had been turned into a boy as a baby and that Tip (who had been searching for her) is that boy. He agrees to have the transformation reversed, but Glinda the Good disapproves of shapeshifting magic, so it is done by the evil witch Mombi.
- The science fiction short story "Who Goes There?" written by John W. Campbell (later adapted to film as The Thing from Another World and The Thing) concerns a shapeshifting alien lifeform that can assume the form and memories of any creature it absorbs.
- In T.H. White's 1938 book The Sword in the Stone, Merlin and Madam Mim fight a wizards' duel, in which the duelists would endlessly transform until one was in a form that could destroy the other. Also, at various times, Merlin transforms Arthur into various animals as an educational experience.
- In C.S. Lewis's The Chronicles of Narnia, Eustace Scrubb transforms into a dragon in The Voyage of the Dawn Treader, and in The Horse and his Boy the Calormene war-monger Rabadash into a donkey. Eustace's transformation is not strictly a punishment — the change simply reveals the truth of his selfishness — and it is reversed after he repents with the later change in his moral nature. Rabadash is allowed to reverse his transformation, providing he does so in a public place, so that his former followers will know that he had been a donkey. He is warned that, if he ever leaves his capital city again, he will become a donkey permanently, and this prevents him from leading further military campaigns.
- Both the Earthmasters and their opponents in Patricia A. McKillip's 1976 The Riddle-Master of Hed trilogy make extensive use of their shapeshifting abilities for the powers of their new forms.
- James A. Hetley's contemporary fantasy books Dragon's Eye and Dragon's Teeth centers on the Morgan family of Stonefort, Maine – present-day Americans who are secretly able to turn themselves into seals at will (and making extensive use of that ability in their fighting with various other characters).
- In the Harry Potter series, some wizards and witches with the ability of 'animagus' can transform into a particular animal of their choice and are required to register with the Ministry of Magic about their ability.
- In the Mortal Kombat franchise, Shang Tsung is a shapeshifter.
- The Shantae platformer video game series features the ability of its titular main character to perform belly dances that can transform her into different animal forms.
- Some fantasy franchises use the term "skinchanger" as a type of shapeshifter that can take an animal form. In The Hobbit, the character Beorn is described as a "skinchanger" that can take the form of a monstrous bear. In the A Song of Ice and Fire series, as well as its television adaptation, the term "skinchanger" is synonymous with "warg", an individual that can enter the mind of an animal.

=== Film and popular culture ===
- The X-Files features a species known as the Colonists who are infiltrating Earth to colonize the planet.
- In David Icke's works, reptilian shapeshifters secretly control many aspects of human society by taking on human form and gaining political power to manipulate humanity.
- In the Doctor Who serial "The Faceless Ones" (1967), featureless aliens known as the Chameleons shapeshift into humans in order to steal their identities. However, they need to keep the copied person alive in order to maintain their stolen identity.
- In the Doctor Who serial "Terror of the Zygons" (1975), the main antagonists, called the Zygons, can shapeshift into humans and other animals (such as horses). However, they need to keep the copied person or animal alive in order to be able to change back into their natural form.
- In the Doctor Who serial "Horror of Fang Rock" (1977), the alien species called the Rutans, ancient opponents to the Sontarans, possessed the ability to transform from their natural jellyfish like form to that of one of their human victims.
- The Marvel Comics Universe features a wide range of shapeshifters, including Mr. Fantastic, Mystique, and Impossible Man, and alien races whose members can shapeshift, such as the Skrulls, the Phalanx, and the Symbiotes.
- The DC Comics Universe features a wide range of shapeshifters, the most prominent being Beast Boy, Plastic Man, Martian Manhunter, Miss Martian, Metamorpho, and the Clayfaces.
- The Star Trek universe features a number of shapeshifting alien races, including the Organians and the Chameloids from the original series, and the Changelings in Deep Space Nine. Among the Suliban, the Cabal also were given the ability to shapeshift by a being from the future, as seen in Star Trek: Enterprise.
- The Transformers media franchise centers upon an alien race of shapeshifting robots.
- In Thunderheart (1992), starring Val Kilmer, the character Jimmy Looks Twice evades capture by shapeshifting at will into a series of animals.
- The Twilight Saga also features shapeshifters that can transform into wolves and have inhuman strength, speed, body temperature and aging process.
- In Star Wars: Episode II – Attack of the Clones (2002), Zam Wesell attempts to assassinate Padmé Amidala. When Zam flees, Anakin pursues her and discovers she is a shapeshifter. Zam Wesell reverts to her natural form when her employer kills her after she is captured.
- In Supernatural, the shapeshifters are recurring creatures of the series. Shapeshifter first appeared in Season 1, Episode 6 titled "Skin".
- In Fringe, shapeshifters are inorganic, human hybrids from the Alternate Universe.
- In Encanto, Camilo has the ability to shapeshift.
- In the Animorphs books, an alien species known as the Andalites has shapeshifting or "morphing" technology that is shared with the Animorphs, giving them the power to shapeshift into any living creature whose DNA they acquire.
- In the Heroes of Olympus book series, the demigod Frank Zhang possesses the ability to shapeshift as a gift from his ancestor Poseidon.
- In the graphic novel Nimona and its animated feature film adaptation, the titular character is a mischievous shapeshifter.
- The 1999 film My Favorite Martian, which is based on the 1960s show of the same name, features a gum called Nerplex, which turns anyone into aliens.
- In the Ben 10 franchise (notably Ben Tennyson himself), characters wielding the Omnitrix are able to shapeshift into various alien species.
- Elastigirl, fictional superhero who appears in Pixar's animated superhero film The Incredibles can shapeshift.
- Two Michael Jackson music videos feature shapeshifting. In "Thriller" Jackson becomes a werewolf and a zombie, while "Black or White" features him turning into a panther as well as involving face morphs between races.
- In the music video for the Snoop Dogg song "What's My Name?", Snoop Dogg himself and others have the ability to turn into dogs, like Dobermans, Rottweilers, Pit bulls, Cocker Spaniels and other dog breeds.
- In the 2000 series Sheena, this version of Sheena has the ability to turn into animals.
- In the 2024 Megan Thee Stallion music video "Mamushi", Megan is depicted with the power to shapeshift into a snake.

== See also ==
- Changeling
- Doppelgänger
- Hantu Raya – Spirit in Malay folklore
- Human guise
- Invasion of the Body Snatchers
- Kindama – Sage in the Hindu epic Mahabharata
- List of shapeshifters
- Maricha – Rakshasa (demon) in Ramayana
- Naagin (2015 TV series)
- Size change in fiction
- Skin-walker – Witch in Navajo mythology
- Soul eater (folklore)
- Skrull – Fictional extraterrestrial race
- The Thing (1982 film)
- The Thing (2011 film)
- Zoomorphism

== Notes ==
=== Bibliography ===
- Child, Francis James (1965). The English and Scottish Popular Ballads. Vol. 1. Dover Publications.
- Colbert, David (2001). The Magical Worlds of Harry Potter. 2001. ISBN 0-9708442-0-4.
- Grant, John; Clute, John (15 March 1999). The Encyclopedia of Fantasy. Macmillan. ISBN 0-312-19869-8.
- Jones, Steven Swann (1995). The Fairy Tale: The Magic Mirror of Imagination. Twayne Publishers. ISBN 0-8057-0950-9.
- Smith, Frederick M. (2006). The Self Possessed: Deity and Spirit Possession in South Asian Literature. Columbia University Press. ISBN 0-231-13748-6.
- Steiger, B. (August 1999). The Werewolf Book: The Encyclopedia of Shape-Shifting Beings. Visible Ink Press. ISBN 978-1-57859-078-0.
- Tatar, Maria (2004). The Annotated Brothers Grimm. W. W. Norton & company. ISBN 0-393-05848-4.
- Wilson, Anne (1976). Traditional Romance and Tale. D.S. Brewer, Rowman & Littlefield. ISBN 0-87471-905-4.
