= Yelbeghen =

Multi-headed man-eating monster in the mythology of Turkic peoples of Siberia

Yelbeghen (Turkish: Yilbeğen, Yilbeğen, or Celbeğen; Latin: Yelbegän, Cyrillic script: Йилбегән) is a multi-headed man-eating monster in the mythology of Turkic peoples of Siberia.

== Turkic Dragon ==
In the original myths Yelbegen was a multi-headed dragon or serpent-like creature (the etymology of the name points to this--Yel = "wind, magic, demonic" and begen comes from böke - "giant serpent, dragon"), but over time it evolved into other forms such as a multi-headed ogre-like behemoth. Some epics feature multiple Yelbegen with different numbers of heads who are the offspring of Altan Sibaldai, "the golden witch", a cohort of the lord of the underworld. Some epics also mention a Yelbegen king named Yelmogus. Still other stories tell of multiple Yelbegens of various colors.

In a legend of the Altai, there was a seven-headed ogre, Yelbeghen, taking revenge from the Sun and the Moon, and used to eat them. The Ülgen shot arrows to Yelbeghen. This ogre sometimes chewed the stars in his mouth and broke them into pieces and then spit them out. Therefore, stars used to run away from him into the sky... According to Altai people, eclipse of the Moon used to take place because of this ogre. For this reason, when there is an eclipse of the Moon they say: ‘’Again Yelbegen (seven-headed ogre) ate the Moon...’’

Yelbeghen, sometimes Yelmogus is generally considered to be a creature separate from dragons and a polar opposite to them in its nature. It is a being of pure evil, a dragon-like beast and dreadful monster with no reason, that usually lives in dark and hostile places, or guards unreachable locations in fairy-tales. It is often multi-headed (with 3, 7 or 9 heads) and breathes fire. It is considered as "extremely intelligent, wise and knowledgeable" creature of "superhuman / supernatural" strength and proficiency in magic, very rich (usually described as having castles of enormous riches hidden in distant lands) and often lustful for women, with whom it is capable of making offspring. It often breathes fire and is generally accepted as a highly respected being, and while not always being benevolent, never as an entirely evil creature. Legends were spread about many historical and mythical heroes that they were conceived by a dragon.

=== Yalpaghan Khan ===
Yalpaghan Khan is the dragon king of Altai and Turkic mythologies. He is the king of all the dragons. He also seems like a dragon with seven heads at any time.

== See also ==
- Hydra
- Zilant
- Yuxa
- Chuvash dragon
- Slavic dragon
