= Zilant =

Tatar legendary creature representing Kazan

Zilant (/zɪˈlɑːnt/; Russian: Зилант [zʲɪˈɫant]; Tatar: җылан, cılan [ʑɯˈɫɑn] – lit. 'snake') is a legendary creature, something between a dragon and a wyvern in Tatar mythology. Since 1730, it has been the official symbol of Kazan, the capital city of the Republic of Tatarstan in Russia. This winged snake is mentioned in legends about the foundation of Kazan.

It is often described as a legendary creature with the head of a dragon, the body of a bird, the legs of a chicken, the tail of a snake, the red wings of a bat or bird, black feathers and scaly black skin.

== Nomenclature and etymology ==
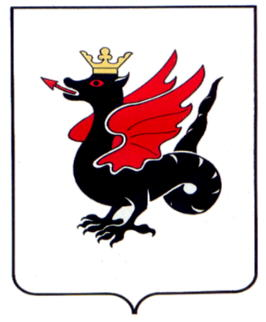
Coat of arms of Kazan Governorate (1730).

Zilant's conventionalized image was the official tamğa (sign) of Kazan's Millennium. قازان is a Tatar name of the city written in İske imlâ.

The word Zilant is the English transcription of Russian Зилант, itself a rendering of Tatar yılan/елан, pronounced [jɯˈlɑn] (or sometimes [ʒʲɯˈlɑn]) and meaning a snake.

Modern flag of Kazan, officially adopted in 2004

The Tatars themselves, on the other hand, frequently refer to this creature with the Persian word Ajdaha (dragon) or Ajdaha-yılan ('Dragon-snake'). Tatars regarded it as a repulsive creature, corresponding to European and Persian dragon. According to Idel-Ural beliefs, any snake that survives for 100 years turns into an ajdaha.

The Zilant/Ajdaha differs from Aq Yılan ('White Snake'), which is the king of snakes. Aq Yılan or Şahmara (from Persian shah (king) and ymar (snake) advised and helped epic heroes (batırlar), often by giving them gifts. As regards his beneficial influence on humans, Aq Yılan resembles a Chinese dragon.

Chuvash and Mari (ethnic groups living in the area of Kazan alongside the Tatars) also have legends relating to the foundation of Kazan, but none of them refer to the Kazan dragon. After the 16th century, Russians acquired the foundation legend from Tatars. For Kazan Russians, Zilant had negative connotations, as it was represented as a Slavic dragon rather than as a snake.

Western culture has strongly influenced the popular perception of Zilant among citizens of Kazan, and many modern citizens imagine Zilant largely as a classically Western wyvern or dragon – as depicted in films.

No strong evidence survives that an image of a dragon or snake with wings occurred in any coat-of-arms of Kazan city or of the Kazan khanate before the Russian invasion of 1552. (Islam – the official faith of the khanate – prohibited making images of animals.) Modern Tatar villages do not have any such thing as coats of arms nor symbols of towns. (Note however that all raions of Russia adopted coats of arms recently (ca. 2004) and that the Russian Empire's uyezd centers had coats of arms before 1917). Zilant is proper name in the Russian language and the role of Zilant as a symbol of Kazan functions mostly as an element of Russian culture nowadays. Snakes with wings appear in legends in Tartar culture, and a dragon – ajdaha – plays a role in fairy tales.

== Legends ==
Most legends related to Kazan are contradictory and Zilant is no exception. There are several variations on the Zilant legend.

According to one story, a beautiful damsel married a resident of Old Kazan. She had to get water from the Qazansu River and complained to the local khan his capital was poorly situated. She advised him to move the city to Zilantaw Hill, and the khan agreed. However, the hill was infested with numerous snakes which were "stout as a log". Their leader was a giant two-headed snake, i.e., Zilant. One head ate only grass, while the other swallowed virgins and youths. A wizard advised the khan to build a straw and wood pile near the hill. In spring, the snakes came out from their winter burrows and crept into the pile of straw. A knight errant was sent out to set the pile of straw on fire, burning out the snakes. They were deadly even in death, "killing people and horses with their stink". However, the gigantic two-headed snake-dragon escaped to the Qaban lakes. According to the story he still lives in the waters of the lake and, from time to time, takes vengeance on the citizens. According to other stories, the giant snake was transformed into Diü, a spirit who founded the underwater kingdom of the lake.

It is also said that Zilant did not escape to the lake but instead tried get revenge upon the knight, who by that time had ridden some 50 çaqrım away from Kazan. During the fight that followed, Zilant cut the hero into six parts. The knight, however, had managed to stab the dragon with his poisoned pike, and Zilant eventually died.

There is also a legend about Zilant's return to Zilantaw. They say that Zilant re-established himself in a big cave near the hill. The dragon would occasionally fly over the panic-stricken city and drink water from the Black Lake. At first the people of the city paid tribute to him, but later they managed to kill him with a wizard's help.

=== Related legends ===
According to one legend, when Bulgars came to found the town of Bilär, they discovered a big snake. They decided to kill it, but the snake begged for peace and pleaded with Allah to give her wings. Once she had her wings the snake flew away from Bilär.

Another great snake was said to live in a pagan tower temple at Alabuğa. Although the Bulgars adopted Islam as early as the 10th century, the snake survived until the time of Tamerlane's invasion after which it disappeared.

Ibn Fadlan, who visited Volga Bulgaria in the 10th century, referred to numerous snakes, especially in trees. Ibn Fadlan wrote about a huge fallen tree, longer than hundred ells. He saw a big snake at the trunk of the tree, almost as large as the tree itself. The Bulgars allayed his fears by assuring him that the snake was not dangerous.

== Interpretations ==
The popular historian Lev Gumilyov pointed out in his Ancient Turks that the Kypchaks, one of the ancestors of modern Tatars, came from the Zheliang Valley in the Altay Mountains. In his opinion, the nearby Zheliang Mountain and Zheliang settlement were named after Zilant the White Snake. If there is any truth in Lev Gumilyov's idea, then the dragon of Kazan should be regarded as a remnant of the once popular Turkic totem.

These flying snakes were also known in Bolghar, Suar, Bilär and the other cities of Volga Bulgaria. For the most part, these snakes were benevolent. However, in the boundary fortresses of Kazan, Alabuğa and Cükätaw, legends about flying monsters flourished. One particular fortress on the Shishma River was known as Yılantaw, later russified as Yelantovo. Many scholars believe that Zilant, like other flying snakes, symbolized the evil rulers of the neighboring pagan peoples. The legendary burning of the snakes may symbolize the victory of Islam over paganism. Sceptics say that the Bulgars purposefully spread those legends in the border regions in order to dismay their neighbors.

There is also speculations that Zilant's origination was not from the White Snake, but the Falcon (Börket), an image similar to Zilant from an earlier epoch.

== Zilantaw in Kazan ==
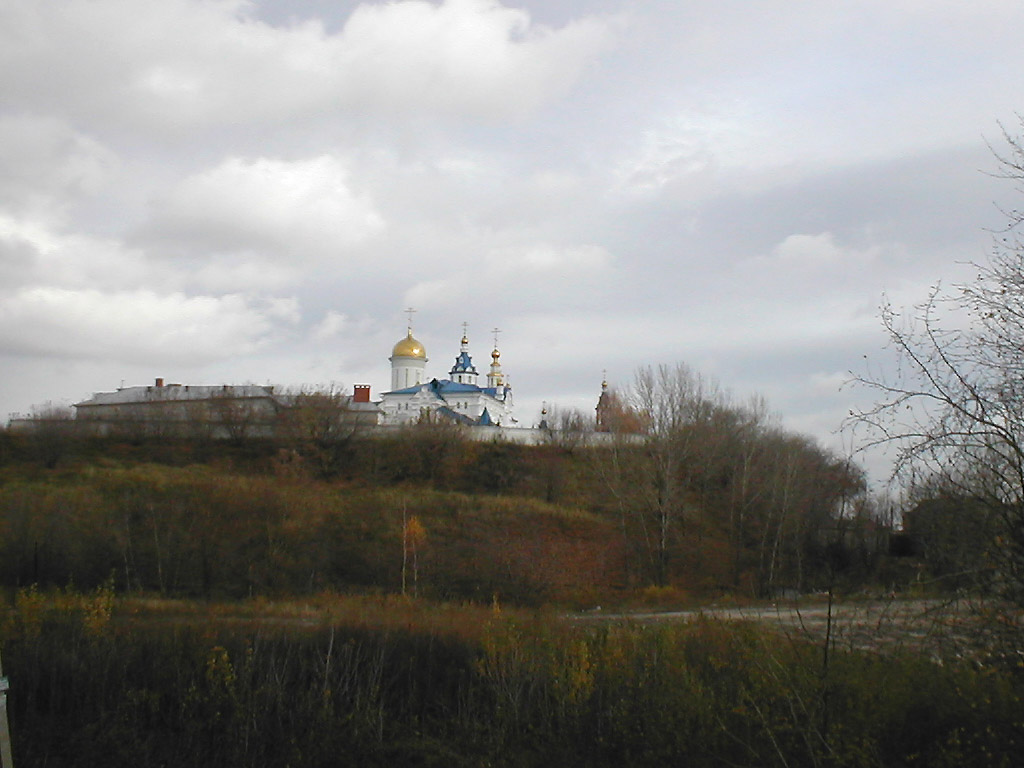
Zilantaw hill with Zilantov Monastery

Zilantaw Hill (originally Tatar Yılantaw, Елантау, Жылантау, Snake Mount), associated with Zilant legends, was formerly situated on the bank of Kazanka River. Some researchers support the view that Kazan was founded here, citing ancient Tatar legends as support. Other legends place the city foundation at Iske Qazan, the Qaban settlement, an Old Tatar settlement from the 16th century. However, these legends ignore the Kazan Kremlin, which is actually the oldest part of the city.

It is probable that a small settlement, not the city of Kazan, had existed at Zilantaw in the Bulgarian epoch (12th–14th centuries). The nearest settlement, Biş Balta, has been known since Khanate's epoch. In 1560 the Zilantov Monastery of Assumption was established on the hill. In recent centuries, the hill was covered with an old Russian cemetery, attested to since the Khanate's epoch. During the excavations in the 1970s, vestiges of an original monastery were unearthed. The most ancient layer contained indications of a great fire, lending support to the legend about the burning of the snakes. In historians' opinion this great fire would have occurred during the 1223–1236 invasion.

Zilantaw actually used to be a high and waterless island, which would make it the best place for snakes to hibernate during winter. The nearest lake was called Zmeinoye or Zmievo, that is, Snake Lake. However, in 1957 Qazansu's course was changed so that the old riverbed, separated from the Kuybyshev Reservoir, was swamped. Nowadays, Zilantaw is an unpractical depressive area, surrounded by plants and depots. The old cloister was reopened here in 2005.

== Zilant as a state symbol ==
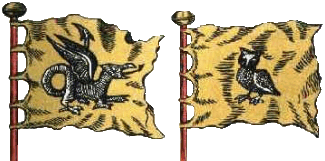
Some Tatar flags

Like Aq Bars, Zilant could have been one of the symbols of Volga Bulgaria prior to the invasion. Some also speculate as to whether Zilant was featured in the Kazan Khanate's insignia. Hollander Carlus Allard noted that The Cæsar of Tatars once had two flags, and Zilant was pictured on one of them, most likely the flag of Kazan.

After the conquest of Kazan in 1552, Ivan the Terrible adopted this image with the title of Kazan's khan (tsar). Zilant was also featured in a seal of False Dmitry I as well as a flag of Tsar Alexis. Early Russian images represent Zilant with one head, four chicken legs, a bird's body and a snake tail. This representation is thus a cockatrice rather than a dragon.

In 1730 a royal decree established Zilant as a coat of arms of the Kazan Governorate. It was described in the decree as a "black snake, crowned with the gold crown of Kazan, red-winged on the white field". Being the coat of Kazan, Zilant was incorporated into the Russian Imperial coat of arms. The image was added to the arms of all the towns in the governorate. Zilant also appeared on the coat of arms of Kashira, a town located to the south of Moscow, as it was an appendage town of the exiled Kazan khan Ğäbdellatíf back in the 16th century. After 1917, the governorate was abolished and along with it, all the imperial emblems that featured Zilant.

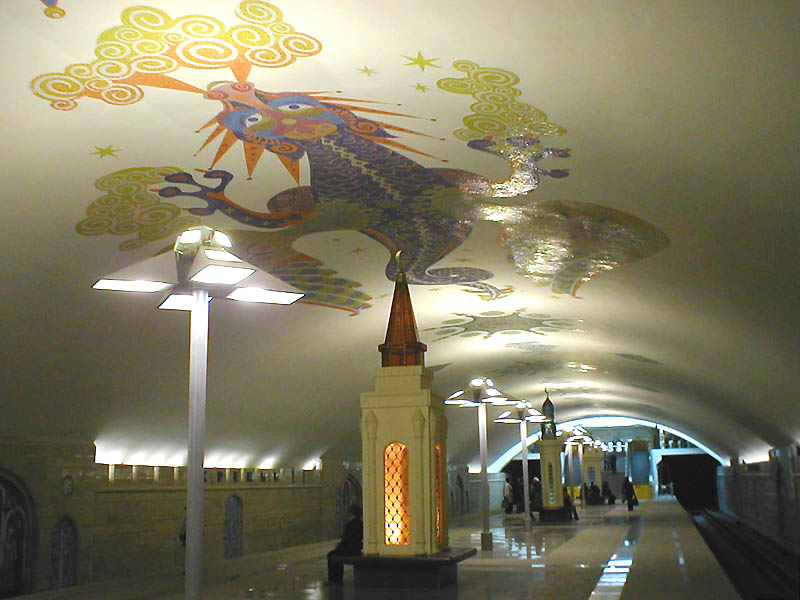
Kazan Metro interior

Coat of arms of Moscow

Discussion about restoring Zilant as a city symbol resumed in the 1990s. Supporters of Zilant referred to the state insignia of the Khanate of Kazan. Some Tatar nationalists, however, dismissed the use of Ajdaha-Zilant as an evil symbol of aggression, derogatory to the Tatars and their statehood. They also pointed out that Zilant might be construed as the dragon killed by Saint George as represented on the Coat of arms of Moscow. According to this popular interpretation, Saint George would then symbolize Muscovy, and the "dragon" would symbolize Kazan.

It was eventually decided that Zilant should be associated with Aq Yılan (White Snake) as a positive Turkic spirit. During the Millennium of Kazan in 2005, Zilant was reinstated as a symbol of Kazan. It is now featured in the coat of arms of Kazan and as well as in the municipal jack.

== Zilant in art and culture ==
Zilant could be seen at the decorative elements all over Kazan. The most prominent is a fountain The Qazan (2005), stylized as cauldron.

- KAI Zilant is a handball club in Kazan.
- Zilantkon (or Zilantcon) is a popular annual fantasy and RPG festival that takes place in Kazan in the first ten days of November.
- The Zilant was chosen as the mascot and logo of the cancelled 2022 Special Olympics World Winter Games, which were planned to be held in Kazan.

=== Gallery ===
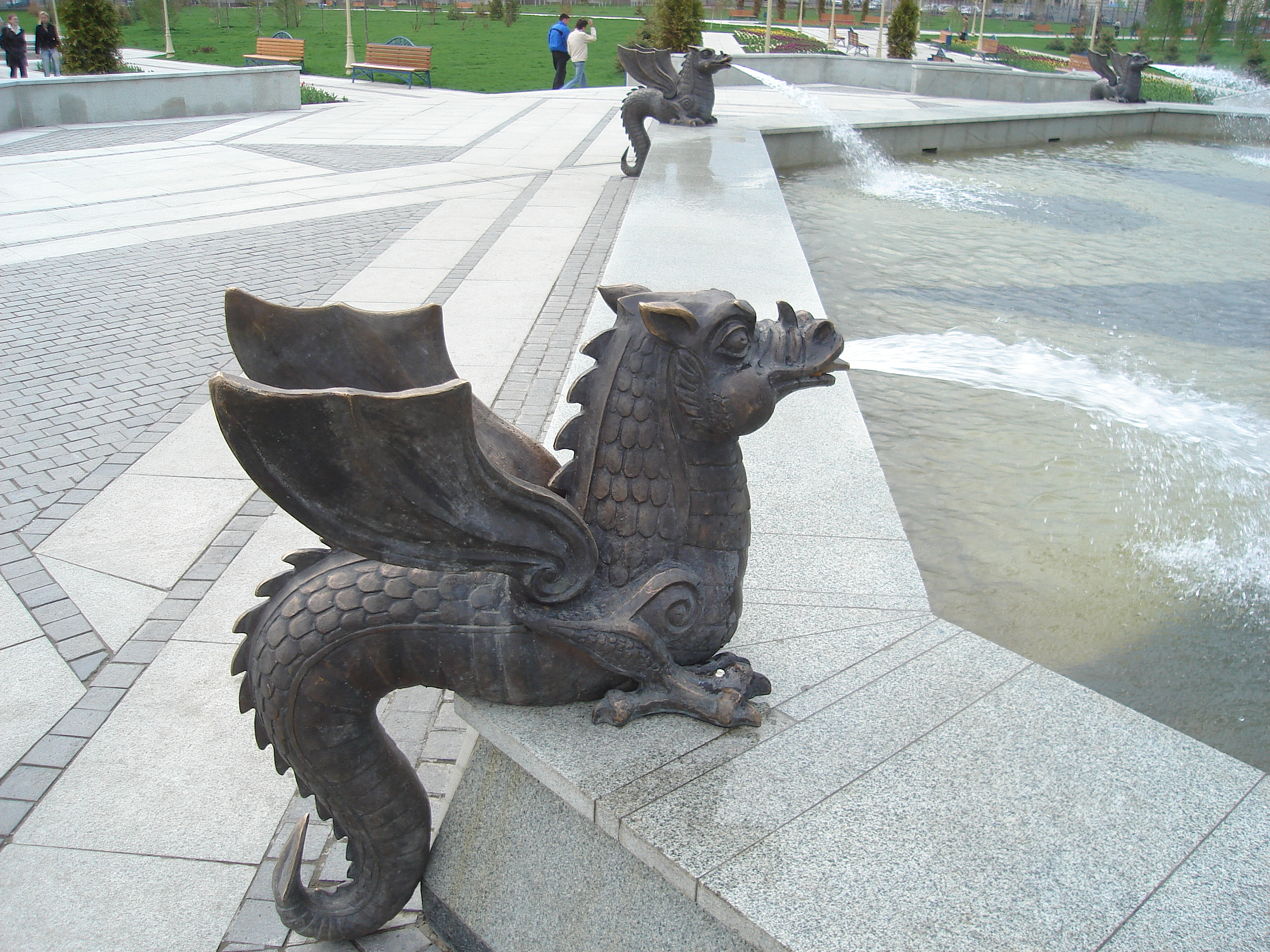
Fountain in the
Millennium Park of Kazan

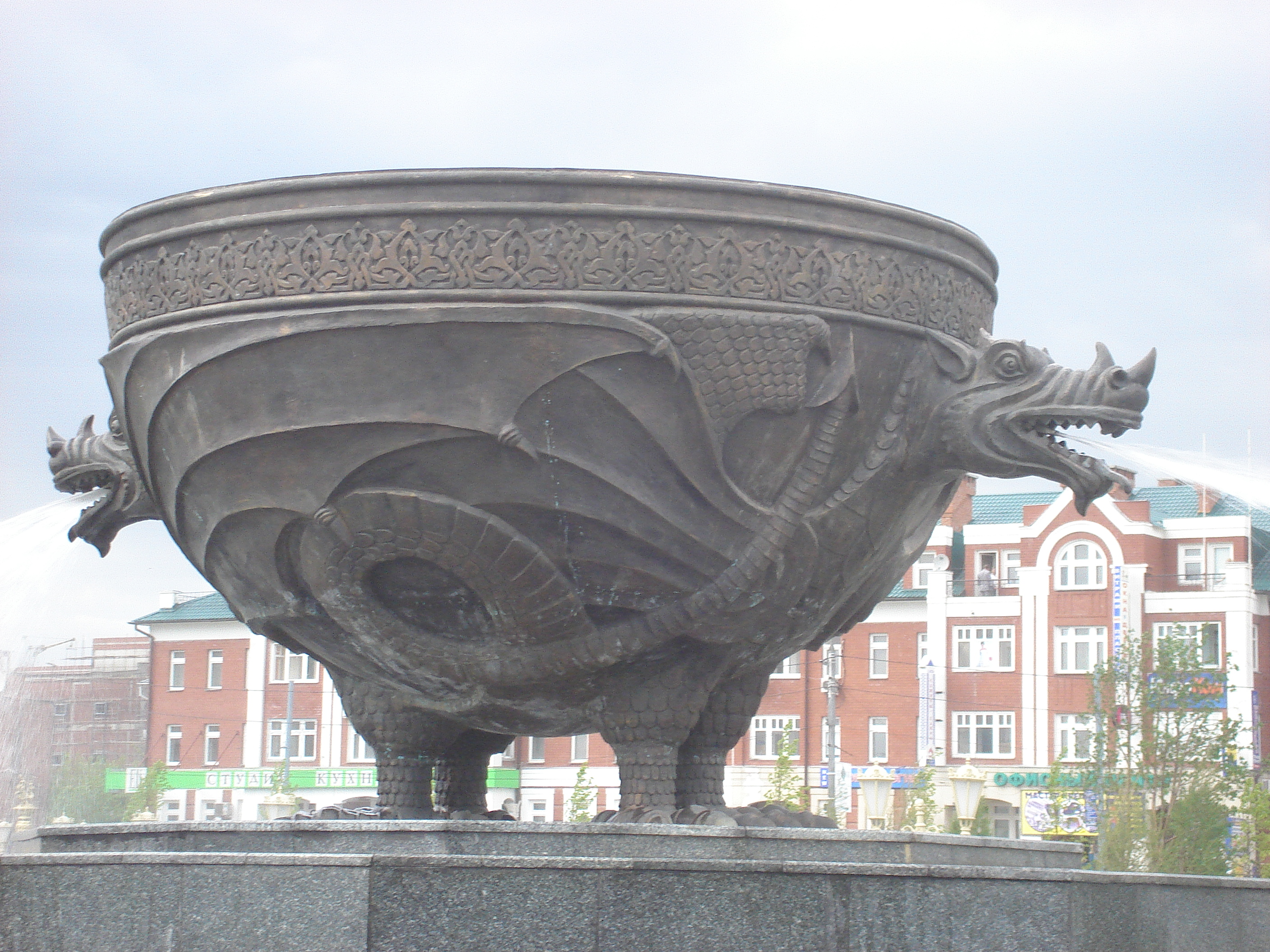
Fountain in the
Millennium Park of Kazan

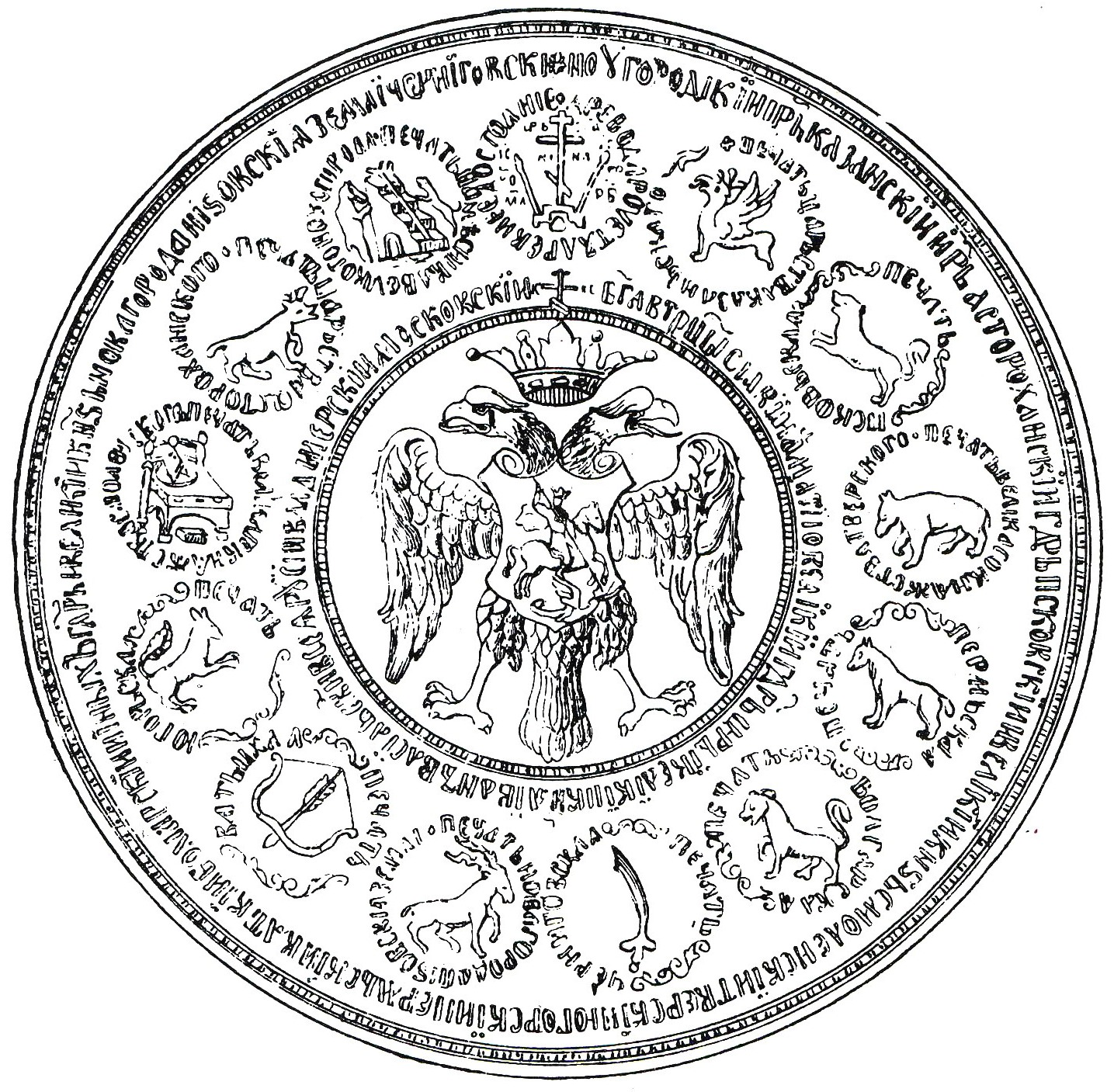
A seal of Ivan IV

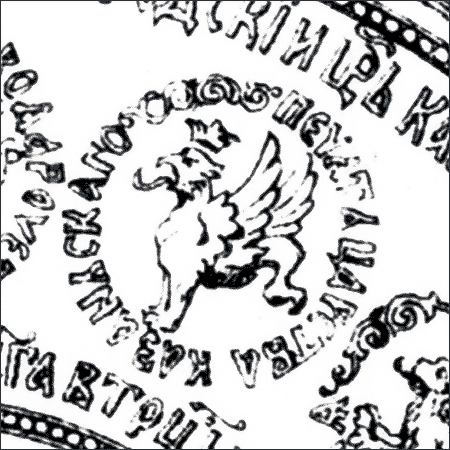
A fragment of the seal, Zilant

==== Coats of arms ====
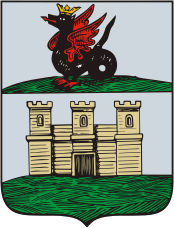
Arsk/Arça (1781)

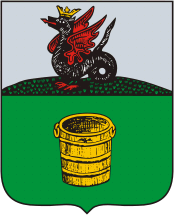
Chistopol/Çístay (1781)

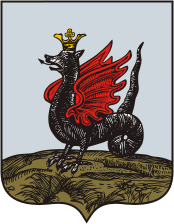
Kazan/Qazan (1781)

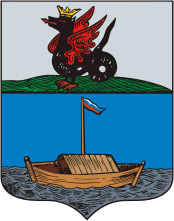
Laishev/Layış (1781)

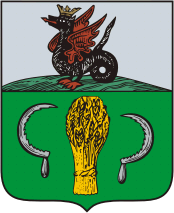
Mamadysh/Mamadış (1781)

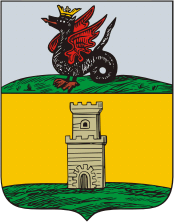
Spassk/Bolğar (1781)

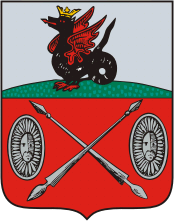
Tetyushi/Täteş (1781)

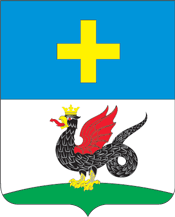
Kashira, Moscow Oblast, 1998

== See also ==
- List of dragons in mythology and folklore
- Yilbegän, Yuxa and Chuvash dragon (Вěре Çěлен) are related mythological creatures.
- Cockatrice
