= Kurdish mythology =

Kurdish mythology (Kurdish: Efsaneya Kurdî / ئەفسانەی کوردی) is the collective term for the beliefs and practices of the culturally, ethnically or linguistically related group of ancient peoples who inhabited the Kurdistan mountains of northwestern Zagros, northern Mesopotamia and southeastern Anatolia. This includes their Indo-European pagan religion prior to them converting to Islam, as well the local myths, legends and folklore that they produced after becoming Muslims.

== Legendary origin ==
=== Supernatural origin legend ===
A legend recorded by Judaic scholars claimed that the people of Corduene had supernatural origins, when King Solomon arranged the marriage of 500 women to jinns. The same legend was also used by early Islamic authorities, in explaining the origins of the Kurds. In Kitab Al-Kafi, one of the oldest hadith collection in Shia Islam, reports attributed to Ja'far al-Sadiq describe Kurds as a tribe of the tribes of jinn, and that they must not intermingle or marry anyone of the Kurds.

In the writings of the 10th-century Arab historian al-Masudi, the Kurds are described as the offspring of King Solomon’s concubines engendered by the demon Jasad. On learning who they were, Solomon shall have exclaimed "Drive them (ukrudūhunna) in the mountains and valleys" which then suggests a negative connotation such as the "thrown away". Another version says that they are the descendants of King Solomon's concubines and his angelical servants. These were sent to Europe to bring him "five hundred beautiful maidens" for the king's harem. However, when these had done so and returned to Israel the king had already died. As such, the jinn settled in the mountains, married the women themselves, and their offspring came to be known as the Kurds.

=== Legend of Milan and Zilan ===
Many Kurdish tribes trace their origins to the Milan and Zilan tribes. According to Mark Sykes, Ibrahim Pasha, then chief of the Milli tribe, gave the following explanation: "Years and years ago the Kurds were divided into two branches, the Milan and Zilan; there were 1,200 tribes of the Milan, but God was displeased with them and they were scattered in all directions, some vanished, others remained; such as remained respect me as the head of the Milan."

One variation adds a third branch, the Baba Kurdi. According to one version of the legend, the Milan settled in Dersim, but Sultan Selim ordered some to sedentarize and build houses, and others to nomadize southward.

A famous semi-historical Yezidi figure of Kurdish folklore, Derwêşê Evdî, was of the Şerqi tribe of the Milan.

=== Descendants of Kaveh's army ===
Zahhak, who is named Zuhak by the Kurds, was an evil Assyrian king who conquered Iran and had serpents growing from his shoulders. Zahhak's rule lasted for one thousand years; his evil reign caused spring to no longer come to Kurdistan. During this time, two young men were sacrificed daily and their brains were offered to Zahhak's serpents in order to alleviate his pain. However, the man who was in charge of sacrificing the two young men every day would instead kill only one man a day and mix his brains with those of a sheep in order to save the other man. As discontent grew against Zahhak's rule, the nobleman Fereydun planned a revolt. According to the legend, the young men who had been saved from the fate of being sacrificed were according to the legend were the ancestors of the Kurds. They were trained by Kaveh into an army that marched to Zahhak's castle, where Kaveh killed the king with a hammer. Kaveh is said to have then set fire to the hillsides to celebrate the victory and summon his supporters; spring returned to Kurdistan the next day.

== Mythological figures ==
The Sasanian king Khosro II Parvez is highly esteemed in the Kurdish oral tradition, literature and mythology.

=== Kaveh the blacksmith ===
Called Kawe-y asinger in Kurdish, some Kurds believe that the ancestors of the Kurds fled to the mountains to escape the oppression of an Assyrian king named Zahhak, who is later killed and overthrown at the hands of Kawe. It is also believed that these people, like Kawe the Blacksmith who took refuge in the mountains over the course of history, later they were called by the profession of their ancestor and created a Kurdish ethnicity. Kaveh is a geographical and symbolic figure in Kurdish nationalism. In common with other mythologies, Kurdish mythology sometimes is also used for political aims.

== Mythological creatures ==
=== Shahmaran ===
Shahmaran (or Şahmaran) is a mythical creature in Kurdish Folklore, she's believed to be a human-snake hybrid that lived in a cave, and she was considered the wisdom goddess to protect secrets. It's also believed that when shahmaran dies her spirit passes to her daughter.

=== Simurgh ===
The legendary bird of Iranian tradition, the simurgh, is called sīmir in Kurdish. The scholar Kamilla Trever quotes two Kurdish folktales about the bird. These versions go back to the common stock of Iranian simurgh stories.

== See also ==
- Iranian mythology
- Armenian mythology
- Ossetian mythology
- Scythian mythology
- Islamic mythology
