= Yuxa =

Turkic mythological creature

Yuxa (Latin: Yuxa Yilan, Cyrillic: Юха елан, Old Turkic: 𐰖𐰆𐰎𐰀; Turkish: Yuvha, Azerbaijani: yuvxa), or Yuha, is a legendary creature in Turkic mythology. According to popular beliefs, every 100-year-old snake is transformed into Yuxa. In fairy tales, Yuxa is described as a beautiful damsel who would marry men to beget offspring.

Yuxa is a legendary creature with a dragon's head, which may be said to breathe fire or possess a venomous bite, a reptilian body, two legs (sometimes none), and a barbed tail. It can turn into handsome young men and beautiful young women to seduce, protect or terrify the people around them as their whim dictates.

== See also ==
- Chuvash dragon
- Olgoi Khorkhoi – Mongolian Death Worm
- Yelbeghen
- Zilant
- Lilith
