= Chuvash dragon =

Legendary winged fire-breathing and shape-shifting creature in Chuvash legends

Verechelen (IPA: [ʋʲɘrʲɛʑʲɘˈlʲɛn]; Chuvash: Вӗрӗҫӗлен Vĕreśĕlen, or Вӗриҫӗлен, Вӗриҫлен, Вриҫлен; Russian: Вереселень), also known as Chuvash dragons, are mythological dragons appearing in the legends of the Chuvash people. They are able to fly, breathe fire, and shapeshift.

The name means 'invisible snake'. These differ from their Turkic counterparts (such as Zilant), as they are said to reflect the mythology of Volga Bulgaria.

== Varieties ==
Chuvash dragon is Věri Şělen (Вӗри Ҫӗлен, lit. "fire snake"). Like the Russian Gorynych, the creature has multiple heads and leaves a fiery wake when flying. The wood demon Arşuri often turns into a snake, but more often he looks like Şüräle.

== Legends ==
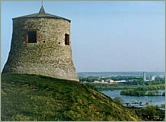
Shaitan Tower in Alabuğa

According to one legend, when the Bulgars came to found the town of Bilär, they discovered a big snake living in the area. When they decided to kill it, the snake begged for peace and asked Allah to give him wings. Once he got wings, the snake flew away from Bilär.

Another great snake, or dragon, was said to live in a pagan tower temple at Alabuğa. Although the Bulgars adopted Islam as early as the tenth century, the snake allegedly survived until the time of Tamerlane's invasion.

Ibn Fadlan, who visited Volga Bulgaria in the 10th century, referred to numerous snakes, especially on trees. Once he saw a big fallen tree, which was longer than a hundred ells. Ibn Fadlan wrote that he'd seen a big snake at the trunk that had been almost as large as the tree itself. The Bulgars allayed his fears, assuring him that the snake was not dangerous.

== See also ==
- List of dragons in mythology and folklore
