= Suar =

Suar may refer to:

== People ==
- Adrián Suar, Argentinian actor and producer

== Places ==
- Suar, Volga Bulgaria
- Suar, Uttar Pradesh
- Suar (Assembly constituency)
- Suar Principality
- Suar River, India

== Other ==
- Suar or Sabir people
