= Esegel =

Esegels (aka Izgil (Old Turkic: 𐰔𐰏𐰠), Äsägel, Askel, Askil, Ishkil, Izgil) were an Oghur Turkic dynastic tribe in the Middle Ages who joined and would be assimilated into the Volga Bulgars.

Numerous records about Esegels in sources and works of many languages across the span of the Eurasia left numerous variations of their name. M. Räsänen suggested Uralo-Altai etymology of this word: Es-kil, Es-gil "Old city", Gumilyov initially linked the Izgils to the Sijie (思结) of the Toquz Oghuz; only to later re-identify Izgils with Xijie (奚結), another Tiele tribe. However, Zuev (2002) distinguished Izgil (> Ch. *a-siək-kiet 阿悉結 > Axijie, a Western Tujue tribe according to Chinese sources (Note: In imperial Chinese historiography, Tūjué 突厥 was reserved for Göktürks, their splinter groups, and politically associated groups, not all Turkic peoples)) from Igil (> Ch. *ɣiei-kiet 奚結 > Xijie, a Tiele tribe) though Zuev controversially links the Igils 奚結 to the Bulgarian clan Uokil and the Indo-European-speaking Augaloi in Transoxania.

Róna-Tas proposes an Iranian origin: Western Old Turkic Askil, Äsägäl < äθägäl < haθyaka arya "the very aliens" (cf. Ossetian æcægælon < æcægæ + ælon). However, Tatár (2012) disagrees that Ossetian æcægælon was cognate with Äskäl, as the expected Hungarian cognate to Ossetian would have been **Æčgæl (Hg. **Ecsgel), not székely, the Székely people's endonym which, in Tatár's opinion, might have developed from Äskil with these sound-changes: loss of first vowel before or after another vowel's appearance between /s/ & /k/, not in Hungarian but in a foreign source language. Tatár reconstructs *Äskil as the Western Turkic tribe's endonym, containing Turkic plural and generalizational suffix -GIl and Iranian tribal name As; she proposes that the As had been originally part of Iranian-speaking Massagetae and joined the Alans in the 1st century CE, yet one group later split from the Iranian-speaking As community, became allies or subjects of the Turks and subsequently Turkicized as Äskils, only to later become enemies of the Second Turkic Khaganate. Tatár also remarks that if székely had developed from æcægæl (even in a Turkic source language and not Hungarian), "the Volga Bulgarian Äskils and the Székelys must be of different origin because æcægæl is not the source of Askil."

Zuev proposes connections with the Āxījiē of the Nushibi half of the Ten Arrows tribal confederation of the Western Turkic Khaganate, and the Xionite personal name Askil/Askel, as mentioned in the Chronography of Theophanes the Confessor (760–818):

"the same month (July 563) ambassadors of Askil/Askel, the king of Hermihions (Greek Ερμηχιονιονων; Lat. Ermechionorum), a tribe living among barbarians near the ocean, came to Constantinople".

Zuev (2004) summarized scholarly opinions on the link between Izgils and Turkic-speaking tribes mentioned by sources in Chinese:

- Cen Zhongmian (1958) identified Izgils with the Axijie 阿悉結 (a Tiele tribe according to Naito) of the Western Turks, as did Harmatta (1962:140-142) and Klyashtorny (2001:50-51);
- Cen additionally identified Izgil with the name Xiezhilue 頡質略 of a Bayïrqu ruler;
- Ögel (1945) and Tasağil (1991:57) linked Izgil and Sekel to the Sijie 思結 of the Tiele and later Toquz Oghuz;
- Ögel further links the Sijie, Axijie, and Izgil to the Chigils; however, Zuev noted that the Chigils (whom he elsewhere identified with the Chuyue (處月) in Chinese sources) did not belong to the "Ten Arrows" union while Axijie did.

A Chinese annalistic account in New Book of Tang about the Western Turkic Khaganate in 651 CE listed five west tribes collectively as Nushibi (弩失畢) and noted that Kül-Irkin (闕俟斤 Què-sìjīn), the leader of first tribe, Āxījiē (阿悉結), (whom Zuev identifies as Esegels) "was most prosperous and strong, the number of his soldiers reached several tens of thousands".

Arab ambassador Ibn Fadlan, who visited Itil (Volga) banks in the 921–922, mentioned in his journal the Bulgarian tribe Askel, besides the Bulgars proper, the Suvars (Savan), the Bersula, and the Barandzhar. Persian ethnographer Ahmad ibn Rustah listed three branches of the Volga Bulghars: "the first branch was called Bersula, the second Esegel, and the third Oghuz". The ancient ruins of the city belonging to the Askel tribe are located in Aşlı

Among other writers who mentioned Esegels, the Persian “Geography“ of 982 named Ishkils as one of three Bulgarian tribes, who were constantly conflicting among themselves. Gardizi, the author of the composition Zain al-ahbar (mid-11th century), wrote: "Between possessions of Bulgars and possessions of Eskels, who also belong to Bulgars, is a Magyar area. These Magyars are also a Türkic tribe". Constantine Porphyrogenitus wrote that endoethnonym of the "Magyar Türks" was Savartoiaskaloi, i.e. Savart (Suvar/Sabir) and Eskel. Zuev summarized that "It is held that Eskels (Esegels) merged with Hungarians (Magyars). Zuev proposes that the ethnographic group Székely (also known as Szekler) are Esegels' descendants." However, Róna-Tas rejected identification of Esegels with Székely, as well as the link between the names Esegels and Chigils, on historical and phonological grounds.
