= Volga Bulgaria =

Medieval Bulgar state on the Volga River

- late 9th century–1240s
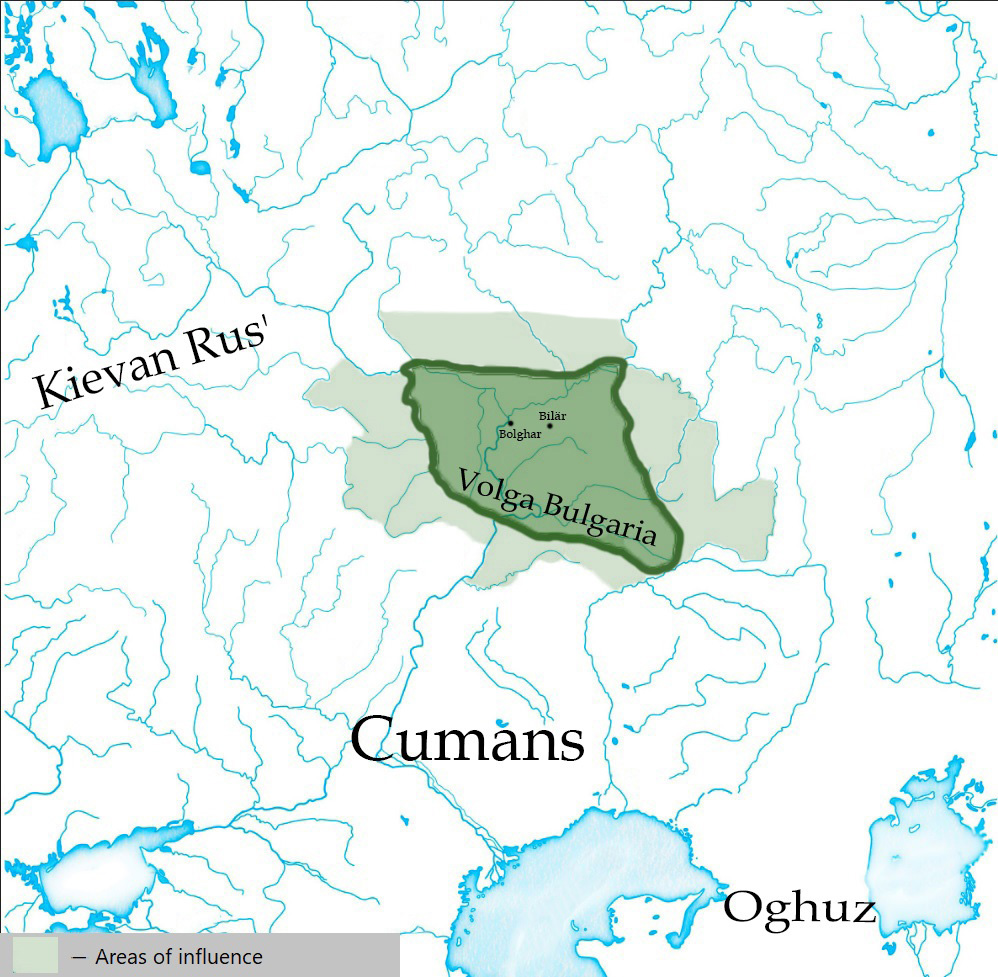
- Status: Vassals of the Khazars (late 9th century-969)
- Capital: Bolghar; Bilär
- Common languages: Volgar Bulgar
- Religion: Tengrism, later Sunni Islam (after Almish Iltäbär)
- Government: Monarchy
- Ruler
  - 9th century: Şilki
  - 10th century: Almış, Ahmad, Mikaʾil, Abdallah, Talib, Muʾmin I, Muʾmin II, Shamgun
  - 11th–13th centuries: Khaidar, Mukhammad, Saʾid, Baradz, Ibrahim, Otyak, Ghabdula Chelbir, Ilham Khan
- Historical era: Middle Ages
  - Established: late 9th century
  - Conversion to Islam: 922
  - Conquered by the Mongols: 1240s
Preceded by	Succeeded by
Old Great Bulgaria	Mongol Empire
- Today part of: Russia

Volga Bulgaria or Volga–Kama Bulgaria (sometimes referred to as the Volga Bulgar Khanate and Volga Bulgar Emirate) was a historical Bulgar state that existed between the 9th and 13th centuries around the confluence of the Volga and Kama River, in what is now European Russia. Volga Bulgaria was a multi-ethnic state with large numbers of Bulgars, Finno-Ugrians, Varangians, and East Slavs. Its strategic position allowed it to create a local trade monopoly with Norse, Cumans, and Pannonian Avars.

== History ==
=== Origin and creation of the state ===
The origin of the early Bulgars remains a topic of scholarly debate, as their precise beginnings are still unclear. Most researchers believe their homeland was likely situated somewhere in the vast region stretching between modern-day Kazakhstan and the North Caucasian steppes. Interaction with the Hunnic tribes, causing the migration, may have occurred there, and the Pontic–Caspian steppe seems the most likely location.

Some scholars propose that the Bulgars may have been a branch or offshoot of the Huns or perhaps Huns seem to have been absorbed by the Bulgars after Dengizich's death. Others however, argue that the Huns continued under Ernak, becoming the Kutrigur and Utigur Hunno-Bulgars. These conclusions remain a topic of ongoing debate and controversy among scholars.

The Bulgars were an Oghuric people who settled north of the Black Sea. During their westward migration across the Eurasian steppe, they came under the overlordship of Khazars, leading other ethnic groups, including Finno-Ugric and Iranic as well as other Turkic peoples. In about 630 they founded Old Great Bulgaria, which was destroyed by the Khazars in 668. Kotrag, following the death of his father, began to extend the influence of his Bulgars to the Volga River. He is remembered as the founder of Volga Bulgaria. They reached the Volga region in the eighth century, where they became the dominant population at the end of the 9th century. They assimilated tribes of different origin who lived in the area, notably the Imenkovo culture that used to dominate the region.

However, some Bulgar tribes under the leader Asparukh moved west from the Pontic-Caspian steppes and eventually settled along the Danube River, in what is now known as Bulgaria proper, where they created a confederation with the Slavs, adopting a South Slavic language and the Eastern Orthodox faith. However, Bulgars in the Volga region eventually gave birth to Chuvash people. Unlike Danube Bulgars, Volga Bulgars did not adopt any language. The Chuvash language today is the only Oghuric language that survived and is often considered to be an offshoot of the Volga Bulgar language.

Most scholars generally agree that the Volga Bulgars, during their early historical period, were initially under the political and military dominance of the Khazar Khaganate. This fragmented Volga Bulgaria grew in size and power and gradually freed itself from the influence of the Khazars. Sometime in the late 9th century, unification processes started and the capital was established at Bolghar (also spelled Bulgar) city, 160 km south of modern Kazan. However, complete independence was reached after Khazaria's destruction and conquest by Sviatoslav in the late 10th century; thus, Bulgars no longer paid tribute to it. Abu al-Ghazi Bahadur named the Volga Bulgar people as Ulak.

=== Conversion to Islam and further statehood ===
Volga Bulgaria adopted Islam as a state religion in 922 – 66 years before the Christianization of Kievan Rus'. In 921 Almış sent an ambassador to the Caliph requesting religious instruction. The next year an embassy returned with Ibn Fadlan as secretary. A significant number of Muslims already lived in the country. The Volga Bulgars attempted to convert Vladimir I of Kiev to Islam; however Vladimir rejected the notion of Rus' giving up wine, which he declared was the "very joy of their lives".

Commanding the Volga River in its middle course, the state controlled much of trade between Europe and Asia prior to the Crusades (which made other trade routes practicable). Bolghar, was a thriving city, rivalling in size and wealth the greatest centres of the Islamic world. Trade partners of Bolghar included from Vikings, Bjarmland, Yugra and Nenets in the north to Baghdad and Constantinople in the south, from Western Europe to China in the East. Other major cities included Bilär, Suar (Suwar), Qaşan (Kashan) and Cükätaw (Juketau). Modern cities Kazan and Yelabuga were founded as Volga Bulgaria's border fortresses. Some of the Volga Bulgarian cities have still not been found, but they are mentioned in old East Slavic sources. They were: Ashli (Oshel), Tuxçin (Tukhchin), İbrahim (Bryakhimov), Taw İle. Some of them were ruined during and after the Golden Horde invasion.

Volga Bulgaria played a key role in the trade between Europe and the Muslim world. Between the eighth and tenth centuries, elite households in Byzantium and the Islamic world acquired slaves from Eastern Europe and the Baltic Sea region, who were traded along the Dnieper and Volga river systems, as well as through the Carolingian Empire and Venice. Furs and slaves were the main goods in this trade, and the Volga Bulgarian slave trade played a significant role. People taken captive during the Viking raids in Eastern Europe could be sold to Moorish Spain via the Dublin slave trade or transported to Hedeby or Brännö in Scandinavia and from there via the Volga trade route to Russia, where slaves and furs were sold to Muslim merchants in exchange for Arab silver dirham and silk, which have been found in Birka, Wollin and Dublin; initially this trade route between Europe and the Abbasid Caliphate passed via the Khazar Kaghanate, but from the early 10th century onward it went via Volga Bulgaria and from there by caravan to Khwarazm, to the Samanid slave market in Central Asia and finally via Iran to the Abbasid Caliphate. Slavic pagans were also enslaved by Vikings, Magyars, and Volga Bulgars, who transported them to Volga Bulgaria, where they were sold to Muslim slave traders and continued to Khwarezm and the Samanids, with a minor part being exported to the Byzantine Empire. This was a major trade; the Samanids were the main source of Arab silver to Europe via this route, and Ibn Fadlan referred to the ruler of the Volga Bulgar as "King of the Saqaliba" because of his importance for this trade.

The Russian principalities to the west posed the only tangible military threat. In the 11th century, the country was devastated by several raids by other Russians. Then, at the turn of the 12th and 13th centuries, the rulers of Vladimir (notably Andrew the Pious and Vsevolod III), anxious to defend their eastern border, systematically pillaged Volga Bulgarian cities. Under Russian pressure from the west, the Volga Bulgars had to move their capital from Bolghar to Bilär.

=== Decline ===
From the beginning of the 13th century, the Volga Bulgars were subject to multiple raids from the Russian principalities as multiple skirmishes took place for control of the Unzha River, which was an important commercial route. In 1220, the Grand Prince Yuri II of Vladimir captured Ustyug and besieged the important Bulgar town of Aşlı. The consequence of this was that Vladimir-Suzdal gained access to Volga Bulgaria's northern trade routes and hindered the means of the Bulgars acquiring fur. The Nikon Chronicle also details that following this, Yuri II began amassing a large force of Russians for an even larger campaign against the Bulgars. The Bulgars would send entreaties and proposals for peace but these were all rejected. Yuri travelled with his army to Omut where further entreaties for peace were received from the Bulgars however these were still rejected. However, by the time Vasilko Konstantinovich of Rostov arrived, Yuri accepted an offer of gifts and agreed to adhere to an earlier peace treaty with the Bulgars that was agreed under the rule of his father, Vsevolod the Big Nest.

In September 1223, near Samara, an advance guard of Genghis Khan's Mongol army under the command of Uran entered Volga Bulgaria but was defeated in the Battle of Samara Bend. In 1236, the Mongols returned and in five years had subjugated the whole country, which at that time was suffering from internal war. Henceforth Volga Bulgaria became a part of the ulus of Jochi, later known as the Golden Horde. It was divided into several principalities; each of them became a vassal of the Golden Horde and received some autonomy. By the 1430s, the Khanate of Kazan was established as the most important of these principalities.

=== Kazan Khanate ===
After the destruction of the Volga Bulgaria by the troops of the Tatar-Mongol army in the 13th century, 2/3 of the population was destroyed -mainly the urban elite. The surviving village Bulgars crossed to the right bank of the Volga to the Sviyaga River, where at that time some Bulgar tribes lived, and to the right bank of the Kama to the Kazanka River, where they founded an area called in the chronicles as "Sainov yurt", which included several cities: Kashan, Kermenchuk, Chally, etc. Later in the Kazan Khanate it was renamed "Zureiskaya Daruga".

In the 15th century, Yuri Dmitrievich, Prince of Moscow, raided the Bulgar region (Sainov Yurt), ravaged and burned the cities of Old Kazan, Kremenchuk, Zhukotin and New Bolgar, and killed the Tsar and Tsarina, as the chronicles report. For about 40 years, Old Kazan and its adjacent territories stood half-empty, until the fugitive Ulug-Muhammad moved the capital to New Kazan at the mouth of the Kazanka River, on an elevated, well-defended hill. People from all its outskirts began to gather in the new Kazan, as the chronicles report: Muslims, Cheremis, Votyaks, Bulgars. Quote from the Kazan History, compiled in 1564–1566:

And he went through the surrounding field and climbed over the Volga, and sat down in empty Kazan, Sainov Yurt. There were few living in the city. And the Sratsyn and Cheremis, who somehow lived in the Kazan voloses, gathered together and came to his aid. And with the poor Bulgarians who remained from captivity, the Kazanians prayed to him to be an intercessor for troubles, who were from the violence and war of the Russians, and an assistant, and a builder of the kingdom, so that they would not be completely desolate. And they obeyed him.

Original (Old Russian):

И шед полемъ округь и перелѣз Волгу, и засяде Казань пустую, Саиновъ юртъ. Мало было во граде живущих. И собирающися срацыне и черемиса, которые по волостямъ казанскимъ нѣкако живяху, и ради ему бывше. И со оставшимися от плѣна худыя болгаре казанцы и молиша его заступника быти бѣдам, иже от насилиа и воевания рускаго, и помощника, и царству строителя, да не до конца запустѣют. И повинушася ему.

At the same time, the collapse of the Golden Horde began, which allowed the Kazan Khanate to emerge, into whose vassal possessions and protectorate the Bulgarian lands also fell. In the Kazan Khanate, the controlled and dependent lands were called Darugas.

==== The Russian siege of Kazan ====
The first contacts of Ivan the Terrible with the subjects of the Kazan Khanate began in 1546, he diplomatically agreed with the mountain people (Right high bank of the Volga) and with the princes of the Arsk and Zyurei Daruga (Left bank of the Volga) about an alliance against Khan Safa Giray who sat on the Kazan throne.

Mountain people are the population of the Mountain side of the Volga of the Kazan Khanate (right high bank), including the Mountain Cheremis (modern Mari) and the Upper (Mountain) Chuvashes. These peoples were under the rule of Kazan, but their relations with the Khanate were complicated due to tax oppression and military conflicts.

People of the Arsk Daruga are the population of Arsk controlled by the Udmurts.

People of the Zyurei Daruga are the population of Zyuri controlled by the Lower (Meadow) Chuvashes.

According to Russian chronicles, the key moment came in 1551, when Ivan the Terrible agreed to build the fortress of Sviyazhsk on the territory of the Mountain Side, inhabited by the upper Chuvash and mountain Cheremis. Sviyazhsk was built to create a bridgehead for the siege of Kazan, and its construction became an important factor in the subjugation of the local peoples.

It is known that Andrei Kurbsky mentioned it when describing the Russian campaign against Kazan:

When they crossed the Sura River, then the Mountain Cheremis (Kozmodemyansk), and those who call themselves Chuvash, they have a special language, began to meet five hundred and a thousand people, because they rejoiced at the arrival of the Moscow Tsar: because this city, Sviyazhsk, was built in their land.

Original Old Russian:

Егдажъ преплавишася Суру рѣку, тогда и Черемиса Горняя, а по ихъ, Чуваша зовомые, языкъ особливый, начаша встрѣчати по пяти сотъ и по тысящѣ ихъ, аки бы радующеся цареву пришествію: понеже въ ихъ землѣ поставленъ оный предреченный градъ на Свіягѣ.

— Tales of Prince Kurbsky.

The troops of Andrey Krubsky mistakenly perceived the phrase "We are Chuvash" (translated as "We are peaceful residents") as the self-designation of the people, which is why the ethnonym Bulgar disappears and the ethnonym Chuvash (peaceful resident) first appears in the 16th century. The term "yasak Chuvasha" recorded class affiliation: the name "Chyuvasha" (šüäš), according to the authoritative conclusion of the linguist R. G. Akhmetyanov, meant "plowman, farmer". However, the peace between them did not last long. In April 1551, the Sviyazhsk governors reported that "the mountain people were rebelling, many had united with the Kazan people again, and there was little truth in them, and great disobedience in them." Soon after, the mountain people "changed everything and betrayed the Russians, and came to the Sviyazhsk city to drive them out." Anti-Moscow rebellions began on the Mountain and Lugovaya sides, in which the Chuvash and Cheremis participated. These uprisings continued until 1557. The Russian government responded with repression: in 1553, for example, 74 Civilian Chuvash, accused of rebellion, were hanged in Sviyazhsk, and their property was handed over to informers. By 1557, after the suppression of resistance, the Chuvash and Mountain Cheremis, who lived on both sides of the Volga, finally became part of the Grand Principality of Moscow.

Translate: The Kazan, former Tatar, Kingdom received its name from its capital city, and it from the name of the river Kazanka (Kasanska), flowing around it with its winding bed. Kazan was built by Perekop refugees from Taurida, during the reign of Vasily II Vasilyevich in Russia. Vasily III Ivanovich forced it (Kazan) to take Tsars for itself, from it (the Kasimov Tatars). And then, when it (Kazan) began to rebel, he squeezed it with threats of a dangerous war, but did not subdue it. But in 7061 (from the Creation of the World), or in 1552 (from the Nativity of Christ), his son, Ivan IV the Terrible, took Kazan, after a six-month siege, along with it and Cheremis (Ceremissis), forced them to submit to the rule of Moscow. However, as a reward for the insult, he subjugated to it (Kazan) and to himself the neighboring Chuvash Bulgaria (Bulgariam), which he could not stand for its frequent rebellions, so that this country, not accustomed to obedience, would learn to bear foreign rule (colonization), and he decorated Kazan by establishing in it the Metropolitanate and the seat of the Chief Metropolitan.

— Journey to Muscovy of Baron Augustin Meyerberg and Horace Wilhelm Calvucci, ambassadors of the August Roman Emperor Leopold to the Tsar and Grand Duke Alexei Mikhailovich in 1661, described by Baron Mayerberg himself.

Original: Казанское, бывшее нѣкогда Татарское Царство, получило названіе отъ своего столичнаго города, а этотъ отъ рѣки Казанки (Kasanska), обтекающей его своимъ извилистымъ русломъ. Казань построена Перекопскими бѣглецами изъ Тавриды, въ княженіе Василія Васильевича въ Московій. Василій Ивановичь заставить ее брать от него Царей себѣ. А потомъ, когда она возмутилась было, онъ стѣенить ее лишеніями опасной войны, однако ж не покорилъ. Но въ 7061 году, отъ С. М., въ 1552 отъ Р. Х., сынъ его, Иванъ, взялъ Казань, послѣ шестимѣсячной осады вместѣ съ ея Черемисами (Ceremissis), заставилъ смириться подъ властью Москвы. Однако жь, въ видѣ вознагражденія за обиду подчинить ей сосѣднюю себѣ Болгарію (Bulgariam), которой терпѣть не мог за частые мятежи, чтобы эта страна, не привыкшая къ покорности, научилась носить чужое иго, и украсиль Казань учрежденіемъ въ ней Митрополіи и мѣстопребыванія Митрополита.

Text "Kazan Chronicler" (1560–1565):

"And after the capture of Kazan, Tsar Ivan Vasilyevich ordered his commanders to go to neighboring Bulgaria, because of the insult to them, which constantly organized uprisings, and together with them he subjugated the Cheremis, because they rose up against his power. And so he conquered them, and burned their cities, and peace was granted to them only under the subordination of his state." Original Old Russia: «И по взятии Казани царь Иванъ Василіевичь повелѣ воеводамъ своимъ ити на съсѣднюю Болгарію, иже обиду восстаніи чиниша, и съ ними черемисы подъчинити, иже противу власти его сташа. И тако воеваша ихъ, и грады ихъ пожгоша, и миръ имъ дарованъ бысть подъ ярмомъ его державы».

Neighboring Bulgaria is subordinated separately from the Kazan Khanate (Kazan Chronicler).

The uprisings continued later:

- First Cheremis War (1552–1557)
- Second Cheremis War (1571–1574)
- Third Cheremis War (1581–1585)
- Dzhan-Gali Uprising (1613–1618)
- Stepan Razin Uprising (1667–1671)
- Pugachev Uprising (1773–1775)

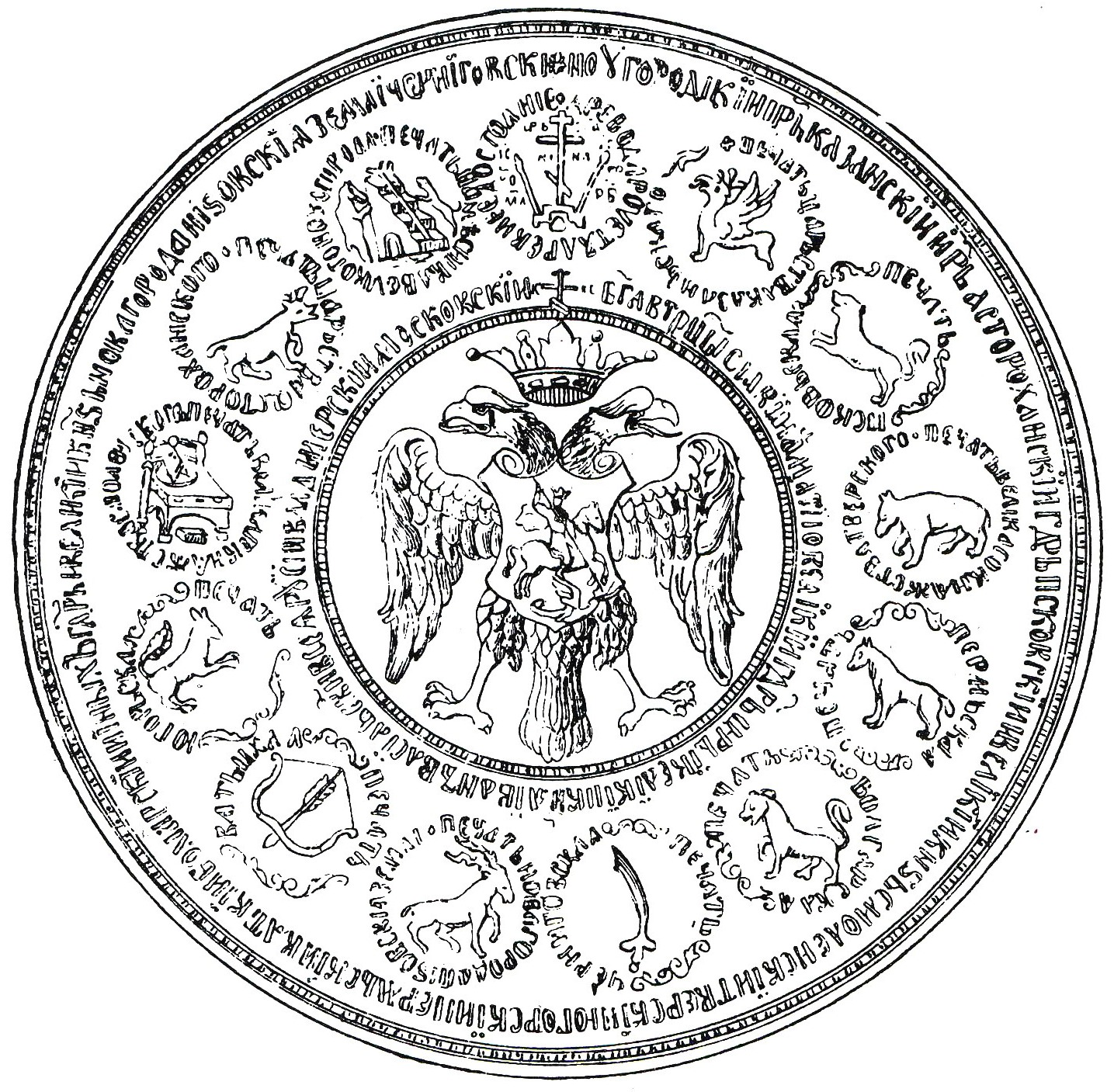
Different coats of arms of the possessions of Bulgaria and Kazan on the Great Seal of Ivan the Terrible

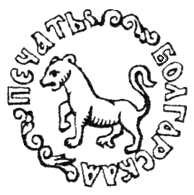
The Bulgarian Coat of Arms (Walking Lion) on the Great Seal of Ivan the Terrible

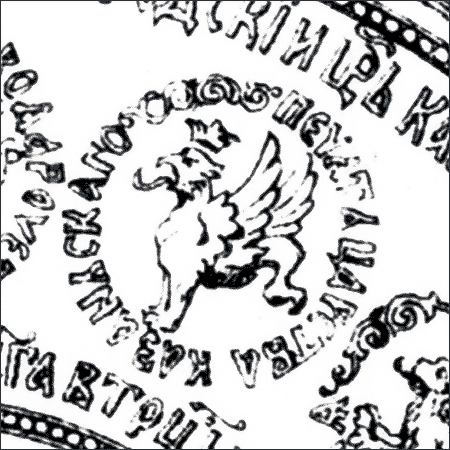
Coat of arms of the Kazan Kingdom (the Zilant snake) on the Great Seal of Ivan the Terrible

As we see, there is a clear division both by Ivan the Terrible and by various chroniclers that the Kazan lands and the Bulgarian lands are different territorial possessions, since it is directly stated that after the capture of Kazan, Moscow separately subjugated neighboring Bulgaria and separately the Cheremis lands. This is also evidenced by the "Great State Seal of Tsar Ivan the Terrible (16th century)", where the possessions have separate coats of arms: "Seal of the Kingdom of Kazan" and "Seal of Bulgarian". These were different administrative lands.

During the peace negotiations in the summer between Ivan the Terrible, in which representatives of the Chuvash and Mari also participated, the tsar refused to return the Mountain Side, citing that he "took it with a saber before their petition."

The first person to state in writing that the Chuvash originated from the Bulgars was Adam Olearius (Germany, 17th century), who visited Russia in the 1630s and wrote down his observations about the Chuvash, linking them to the Bulgars based on local legends and stories. The first edition of the book was published in Schleswig, 1647, "Beschreibung der muscowitischen und persischen Reise"("Description of a Journey to Muscovy and Persia"), p. 192 (German edition):

"The Chuvash, who now live along the Volga, are the remnants of the ancient Bulgarians, who once had a powerful kingdom, but are now under the rule of Moscow" Original: «Die Tschuwaschen, so jetzt an der Wolga wohnen, sollen die Überbleibsel der alten Bulgaren seyn, welche sonst ein mächtig Königreich gehabt»

The second person to assert that the Chuvashes "call themselves Bulgars, just as the Russians call them" was V.N. Tatishchev, who personally traveled all over the Volga region and founded the city of Stavropol (now Tolyatti), wrote in his work "Russian History from the Most Ancient Times": Book 1, Part 1, p. 156 (in the new edition p. 234):

"The Chuvash, as they call themselves and the Russians, are ancient Bulgarians who had their dwellings up and down the Volga, but then many of them moved to other places." Original: «Чуваши, яко сами себя и от россиян тако зовут, суть болгары древние, иже по Волге вниз и вверх жилища свои имели, но потом многие из них в иные места переселились»

The next person to connect the Chuvash with the Bulgars was Johann Georg Gmelin (Germany/Russia, 18th century) "Reise durch Sibirien von dem Jahr 1733 bis 1743" ("Travel through Siberia from 1733 to 1743"), volume 2, Göttingen, 1752, p. 87:

"The Chuvash, whom I met in the Kazan region, are the descendants of the ancient Volga Bulgars, who have preserved their language" (Travel across Russia, 1733–1743, volume 2). Original: «Die Tschuwaschen, die ich im Kazanschen Lande angetroffen, sind Nachkommen der alten Wolga-Bulgaren, welche ihre Sprache erhalten haben»

Context: Gmelin, a German scholar in Russian service, conducted expeditions along the Volga region and left records about the Chuvash, based on their language and traditions.

Later in 1863, Khusain Faizkhanov, after unsuccessful attempts to translate the epitaphs of the "Volga Bulgars" from the Tatar language, however, paying attention to the Russian assertion about the Bulgar origin of the Chuvash, read the inscriptions based on the data of the Chuvash language, after which he published his work: Three Bulgar gravestone inscriptions. News of the Imperial Archaeological Society. – St. Petersburg, 1863. – Vol. IV. – pp. 396–404, table III

== Language ==
The Bulgar language belonged to the Oghuric branch of the Turkic language family, whose only extant member is the Chuvash language. The language persisted in the Volga region up until the 13th or 14th century. Although there is no direct evidence, some scholars believe it gave rise to modern Chuvash language while others support the idea that Chuvash is another distinct Oghur Turkic language.

Italian historian and philologist Igor de Rachewiltz noted a significant distinction of the Chuvash language from other Turkic languages. According to him, the Chuvash language does not share certain common characteristics with Turkic languages to such a degree that some scholars consider Chuvash as an independent branch from Turkic and Mongolic. The Turkic classification of Chuvash was seen as a compromise solution for classification purposes.

Definition of verbs in Volga Bulgar

Tenses and moods	Volga Bulgar	Examples in words
Past tense	-ti/tı, -ri/rı	وَلتِ (vel-ti)
Past tense 2	-ruvı/rüvi (<*-dugı), -tuvı/tüvi (<*-tugı)	كُوَجڔوُي (küveč-rüvi), بلطُوى (bal-tuvı)
Adjective form of verb	-an/en	طَنَان (tan-an), سَوَان (sev-en)
Adverb form of verb	-sa/se	بَرسَ (bar-sa)
Third person imperative	-tur/tür	طَنْطُرْ (tan-tur)

Volga Bulgars left some inscriptions in tombstones. There are few surviving inscriptions in the Volga Bulgar language, as the language was primarily an oral language and the Volga Bulgars did not develop a writing system until much later in their history. After converting to Islam, some of these inscriptions were written using Arabic letters while the use of the Orkhon script continued. Mahmud al-Kashgari provides some information about the language of the Volga Bulgars, whom he refers to as Bulghars. Some scholars suggest Hunnic had strong ties with Bulgar and to modern Chuvash and classify this grouping as separate Hunno-Bulgar languages. However, such speculations are not based on proper linguistic evidence, since the language of the Huns is almost unknown except for a few attested words and personal names. Scholars generally consider Hunnish as unclassifiable.

Numbers and Vocabulary in Volga Bulgar

	Volga Bulgar	Chuvash	Proto-Turkic
one	بر (b^{i}r)	пӗр (pĕr)	*bīr
two	اک (ek^{i})	иккӗ (ikkĕ)	*ẹki
three	وج (v^{e}č)	виççӗ (viççĕ)	*üč
four	تُوات (tüvet)	тăваттă (tăvattă)	*tȫrt
five	بل (b^{e}l), بيال (b^{i}yel)	пиллӗк (pillĕk)	*bẹ̄ĺ(k)
six	اَلطِ (altï)	улттӑ (ulttă)	*altï
seven	جىَاتِ (cyeti)	ҫиччӗ (śiččĕ)	*yẹti
eight	ڛَكِڔ (sekir)	саккӑр (sakkăr)	*sekiŕ
nine	طُخِڔ (tuxïr)	тӑххӑр (tăhhăr)	*tokuŕ
ten	وان (van)	вуннӑ (vunnă)	*ōn
twenty	جِيِرم (ciyir^{i}m)	ҫирӗм (śirĕm)	*yẹgirmi
thirty	وطر (v^{u}t^{u}r)	вӑтӑр (văt̬ăr)	*otuŕ
forty	حرح (x^{ï}r^{ï}x)	хӗрӗх (hĕrĕh)	*kïrk
fifty	الو (el^{l}ü)	аллӑ (allă)	*ellig
hundred	جُور (cǖr)	ҫӗр (śĕr)	*yǖŕ

Mahmud al-Kashgari also provides some examples of Volga Bulgar words, poems, and phrases in his dictionary.. However, Mahmud al-Kashgari himself wasn't a native speaker of Volga Bulgar. Despite its limitations, Mahmud al-Kashgari's work remains an important source of information about the Volga Bulgar language and its place within the broader Turkic language family.

Cases in Volga Bulgar

Case	Volga Bulgar	Examples in words
Genitive	-∅ or -(ı)n	اَغَان (ağā-n), يغقوُتن (yaquut-ın)
Accusative	-ne/na	مَسجِذڛَمنَ (mesčidsem-ne)
Dative-locative	-a/e and -ne/na	اِشنَ (iš-ne), بَجنَ (bač-na), جَالَ (čāl-a)
Ablative	-ran, -ren; -tan, -ten	ڊنيَاڔَان (d^{ö}nyā-ran)
Third person possessive	-i, -ı; -si, -sı	هِيرِ (hīr-i), اِلغِجِڛِ (ılğıčı-sı)

== Coats of arms of Volga Bulgaria during Tsarist Russia ==
Ivan III was also called the "Prince of Bulgaria". The mention of the Bulgarian land has been present in the royal title since 1490. This refers to Volga Bulgaria.

Ivan by the grace of God is the sovereign of all Russia and the Grand Duke of Vladimir, and Moscow, and Novgorod, and Pskov, and Tver, and Yugra, and Prmsk, and Bolgar and others

It is known that the Bulgarian coat of arms figure was used to designate the Bulgarian Kingdom and in the Great Seal of Tsar John IV. The seal was a "lion walking" (which is confirmed by the seals of the Volga Bulgarians found by archaeologists). On the coats of arms and seals of the Russian tsars, the lands of Volga Bulgaria were represented on a green field by a silver walking lamb with a red banner divided by a silver cross; the shaft is gold. The erroneous perception of the beast on the Bulgarian coat of Arms in the Royal Titular as a lamb is explained by the poor quality of the reproduction of the image. In the "Historical Dictionary of Russian Sovereigns ..." by I. Nekhachin (ed. by A.Reshetnikov, 1793), the Bulgarian coat of arms is described as follows: "Bulgarian, in a blue field, a silver lamb wearing a red banner." Over time, the colour of the shield changed to green. In the Manifesto on the full coat of arms of the Empire (1800), the Bulgarian coat of arms is described as follows: "In a green field it has a white Lamb with a golden radiance near its head; in its right front paw it holds a Christian banner." The description of the coat of arms, approved in 1857: "The Bulgarian coat of arms: a silver lamb walking in a green field, with a scarlet banner, on which the cross is also silver; the shaft is gold."

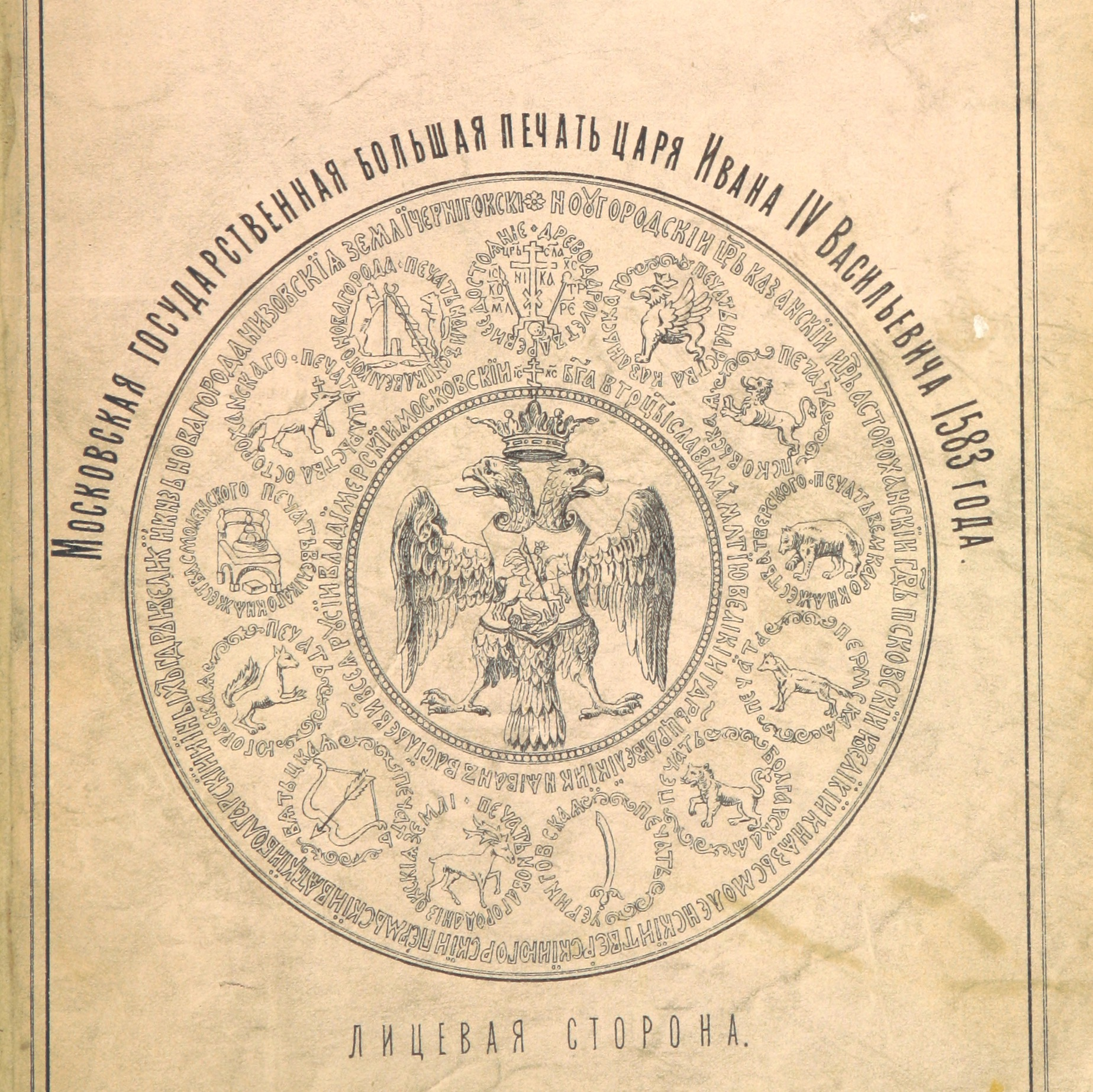
Coat of arms of the Volga Bulgars on the great state seal of Ivan IV Grozny

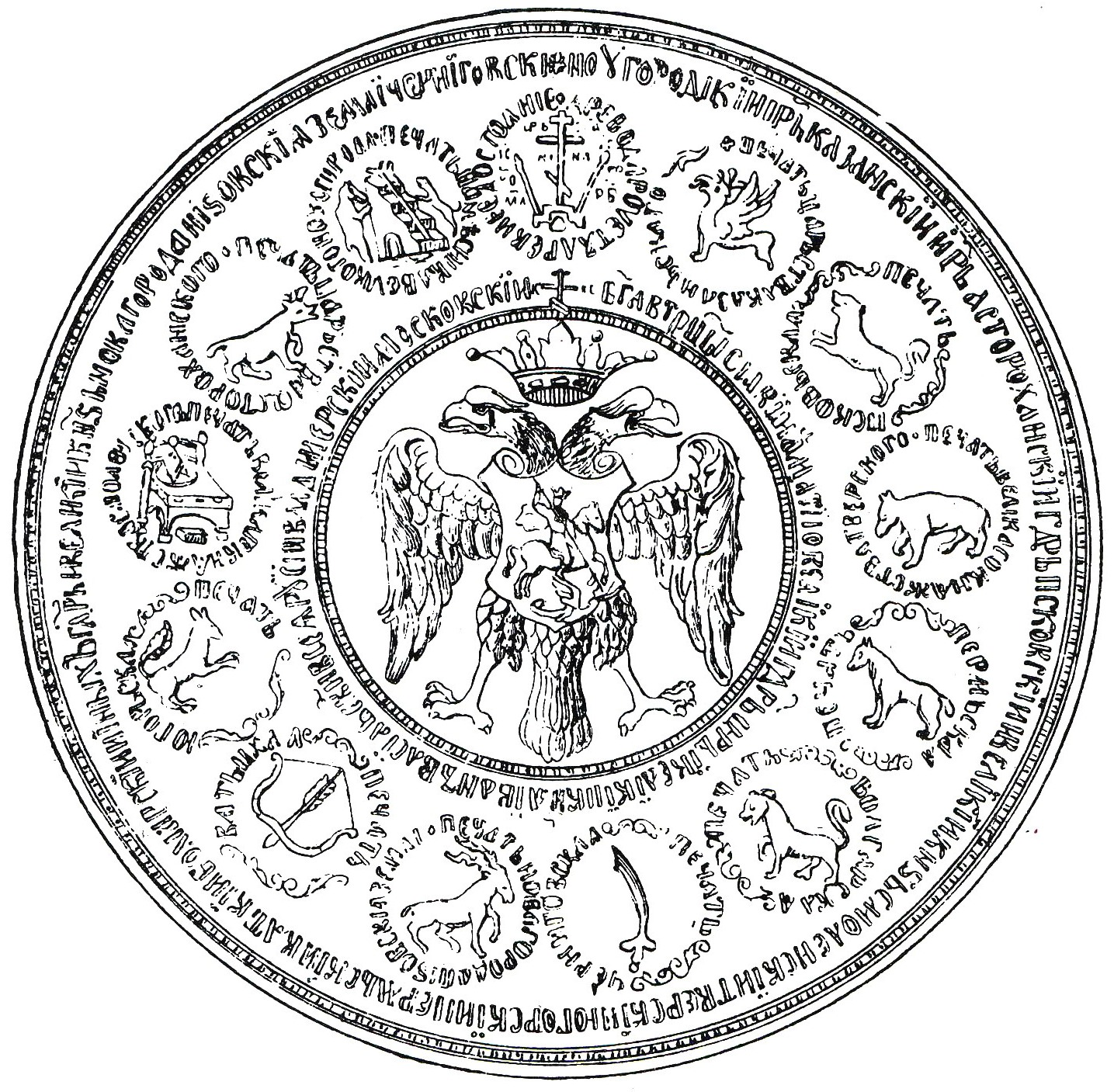
Coat of arms of the Volga Bulgars on the great state seal of Ivan IV Grozny

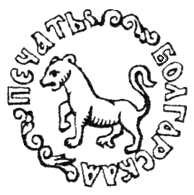
Bulgarian Seal from the Great Seal of Ivan Grozny

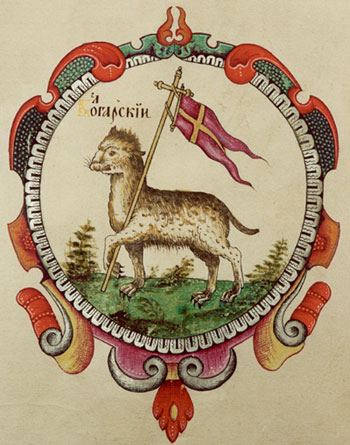
Coat of arms of Volga Bulgaria 1672

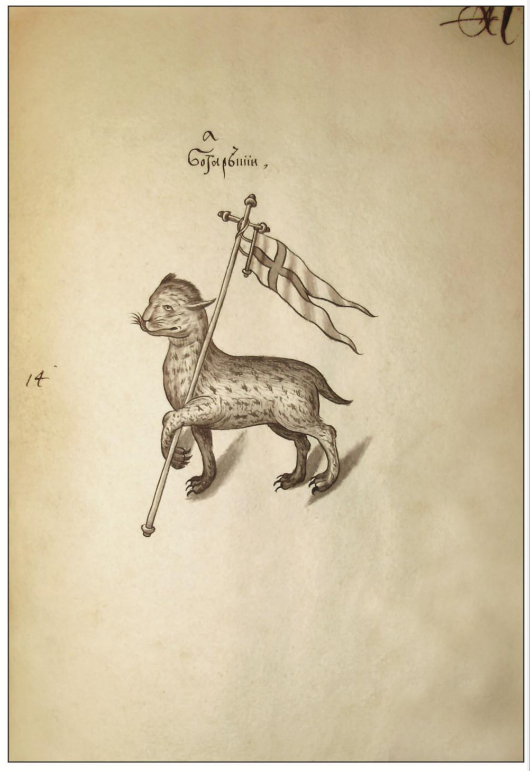
Coat of arms of the Volga Bulgars. Tatarnikov K.V. Banners and coats of arms of the regiments of the Russian Army of the reigns of Catherine I and Peter II (1725-1730)

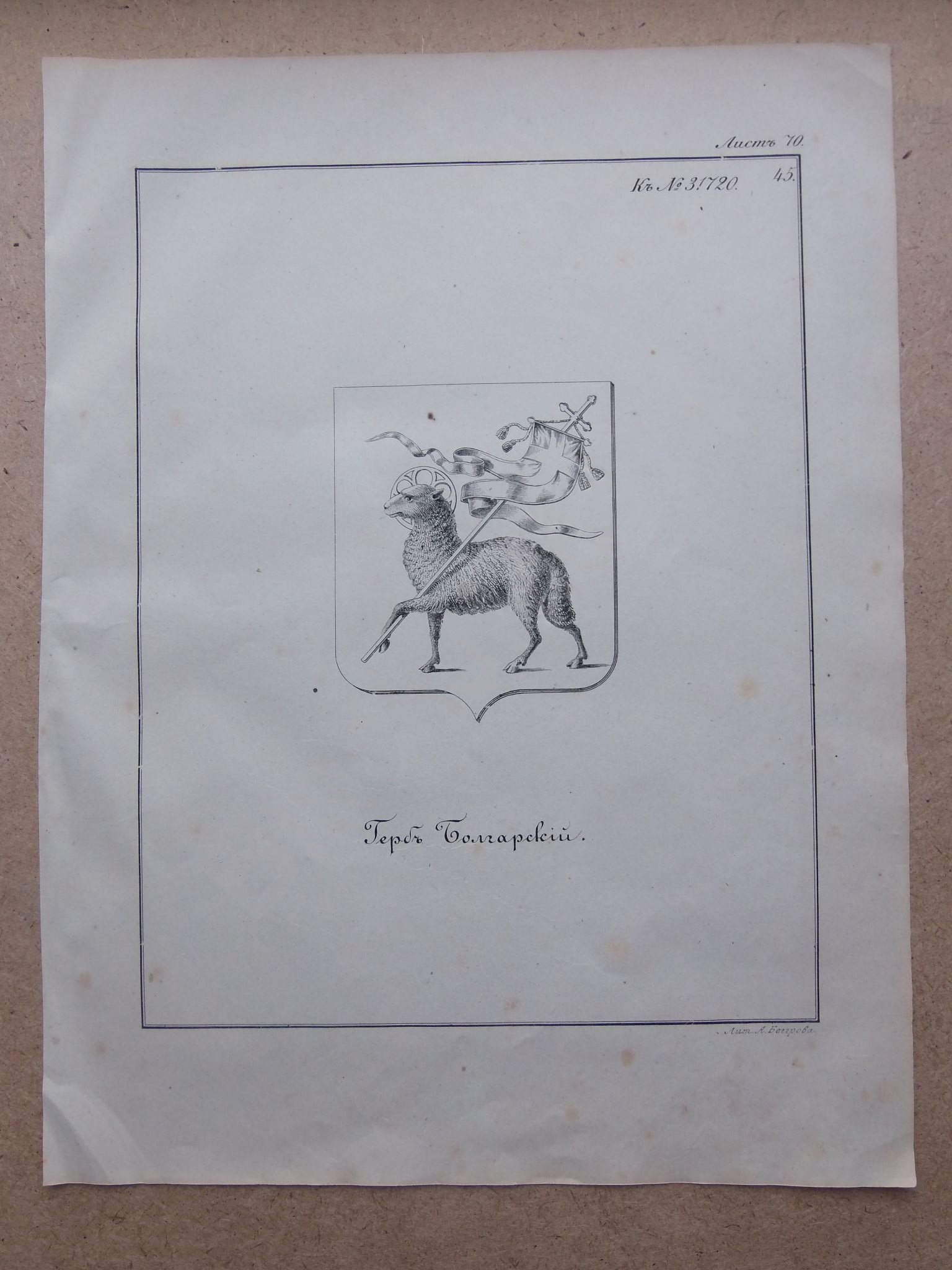
Coat of Arms of Bulgaria 1857

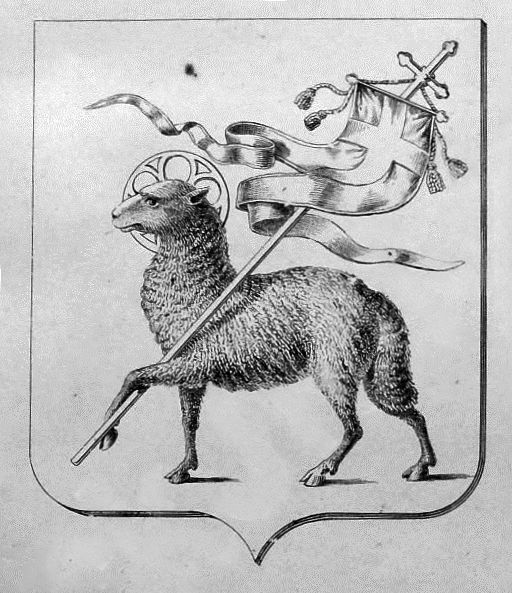
Coat of Arms of Bulgaria 1857

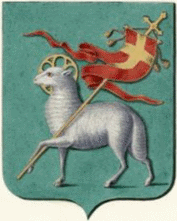
Coat of Arms of Volga Bulgaria

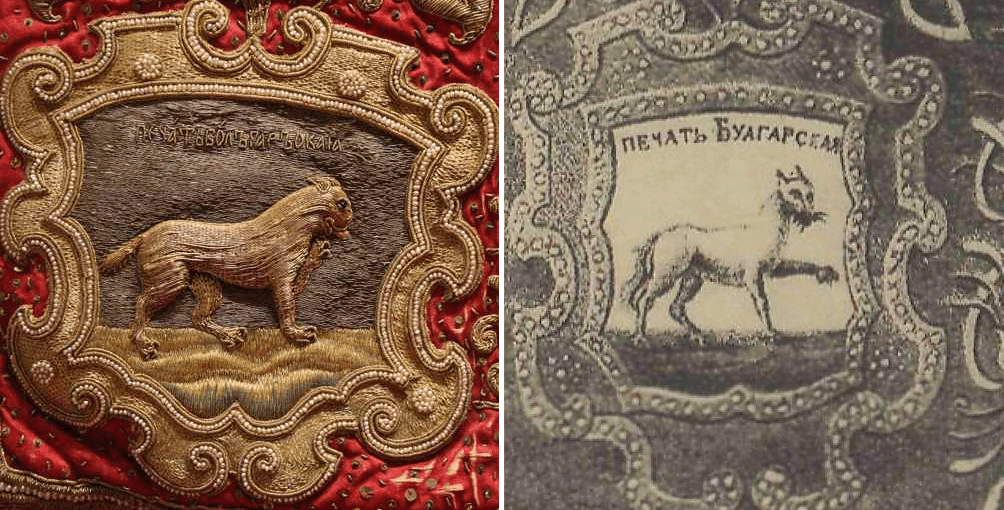
Coat of arms of Volga Bulgaria 1626

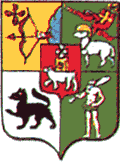
Upper right corner coat of arms of Volga Bulgaria

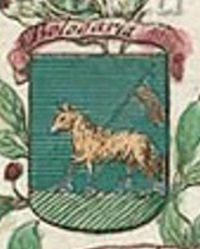
Coat of arms of Volga Bulgaria 1714

== Demographics ==
A large part of the region's population included Turkic groups such as Sabirs, Esegel, Barsil, Bilars, Baranjars, and part of the obscure Burtas (by ibn Rustah). Modern Chuvash claim to descend from Sabirs, Esegels, and Volga Bulgars.

Another part comprised Volga Finnic and Magyar (Asagel and Pascatir) tribes, from which Bisermäns probably descend. Ibn Fadlan refers to Volga Bulgaria as Saqaliba, a general Arabic term for Slavic people. Other researches tie the term to the ethnic name Scythian (or Saka in Persian).

Over time, the cities of Volga Bulgaria were rebuilt and became trade and craft centres of the Golden Horde. Some Volga Bulgars, primarily masters and craftsmen, were forcibly moved to Sarai and other southern cities of the Golden Horde. Volga Bulgaria remained a centre of agriculture and handicraft.

== Gallery ==
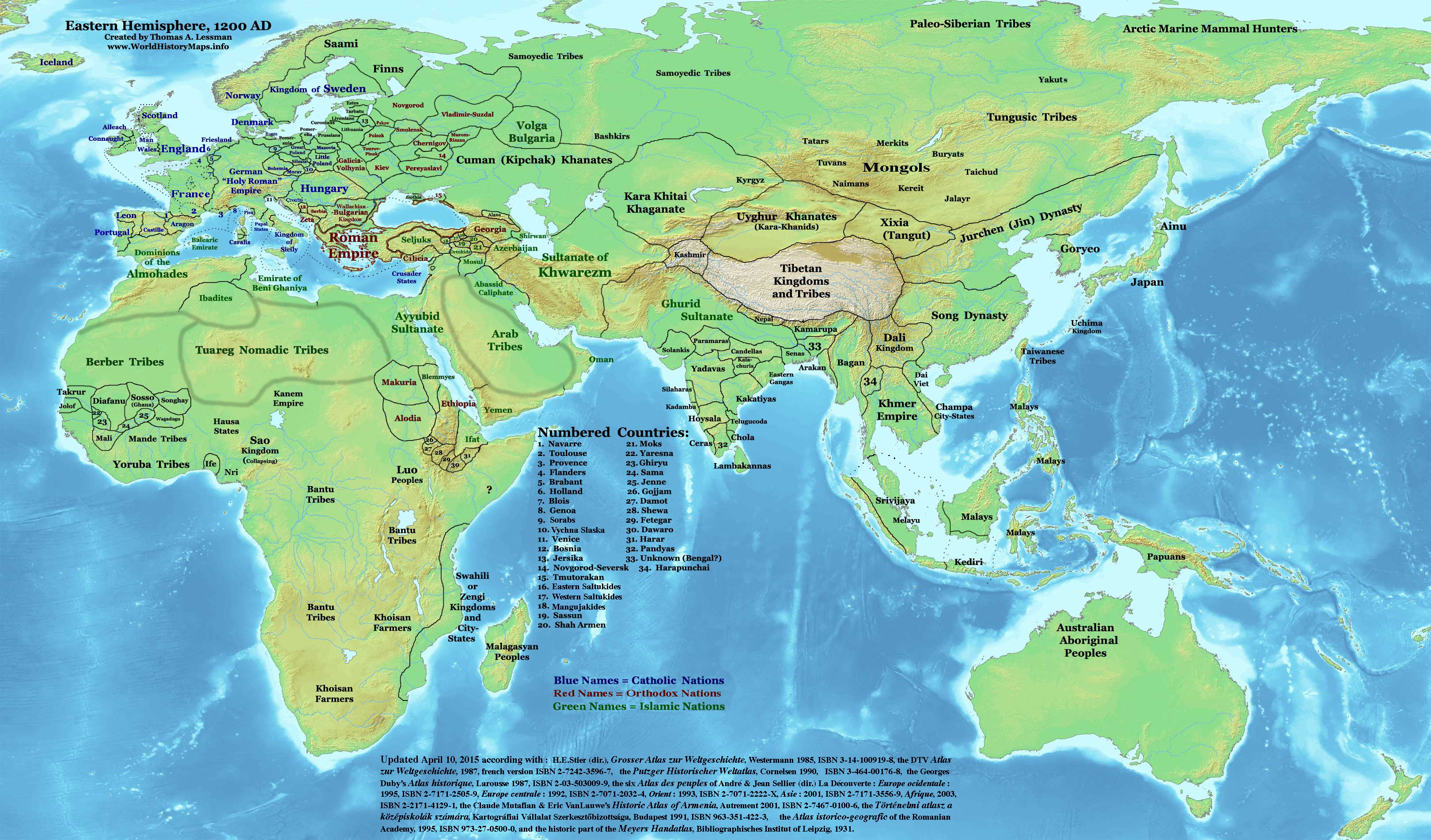
Volga Bulgaria in the Eurasian world of AD 1200.

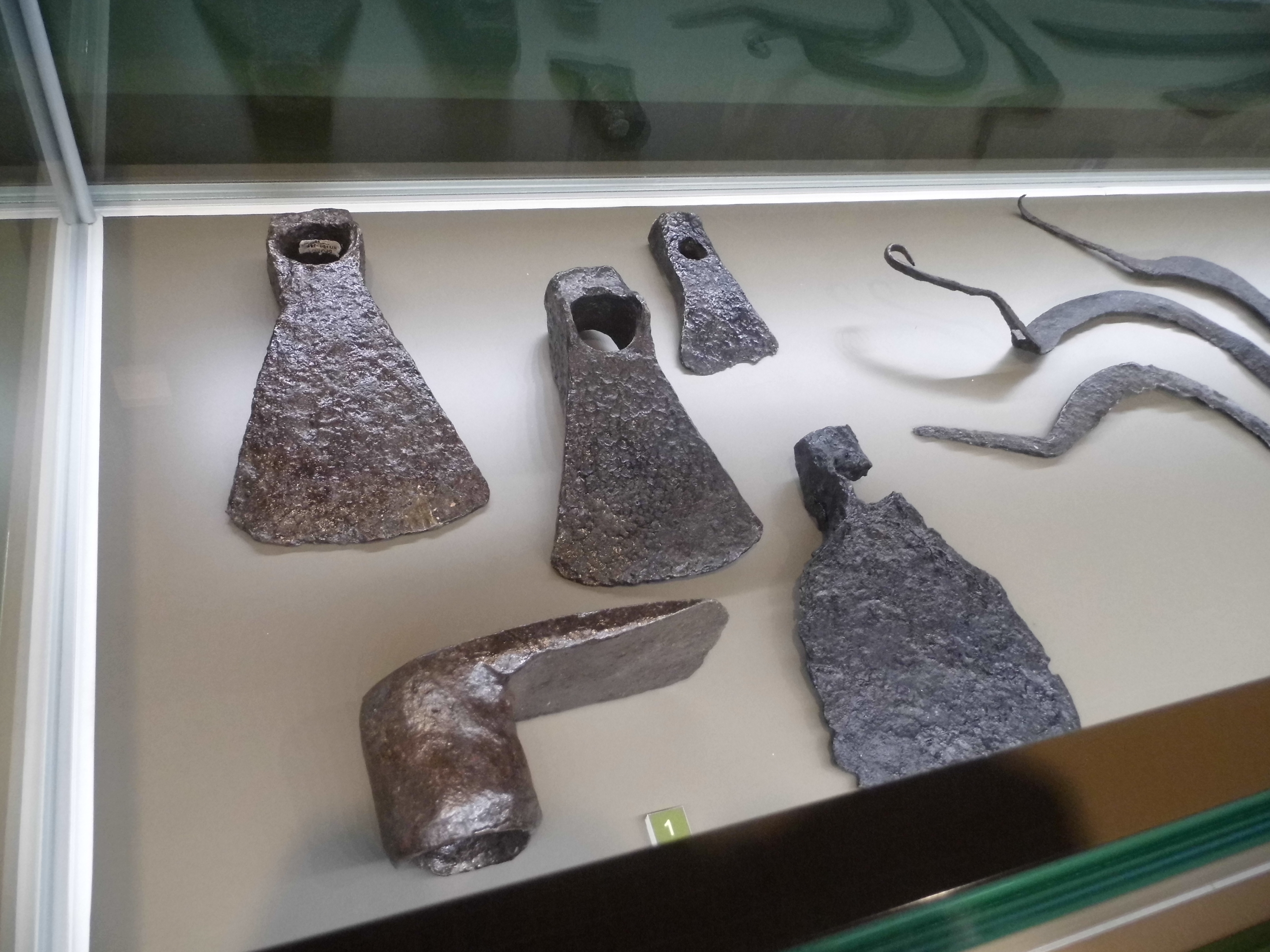
Adzes, Volga Bulgaria, 13-14 century.

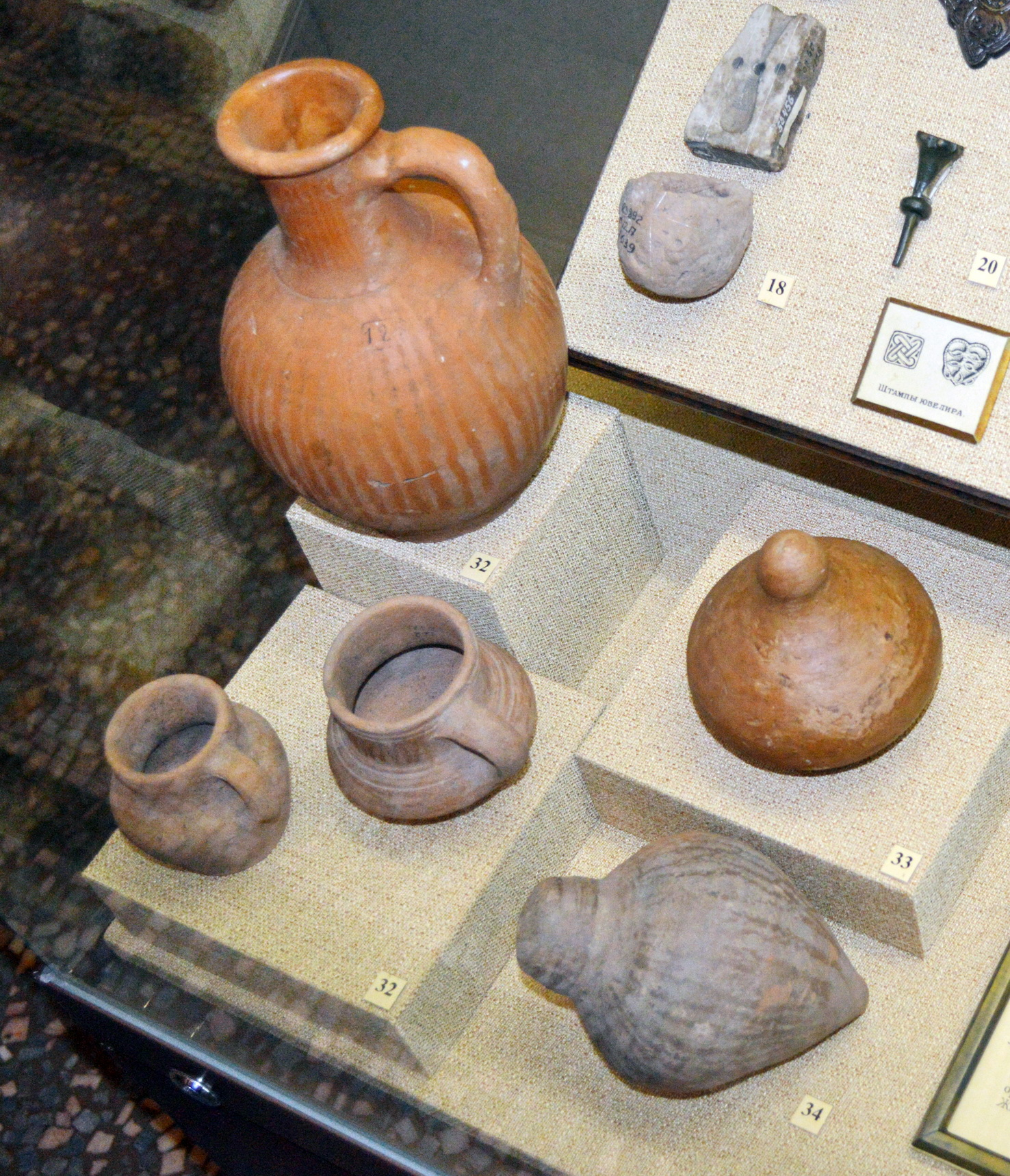
Pottery of Volga Bulgaria, 10-14 century.

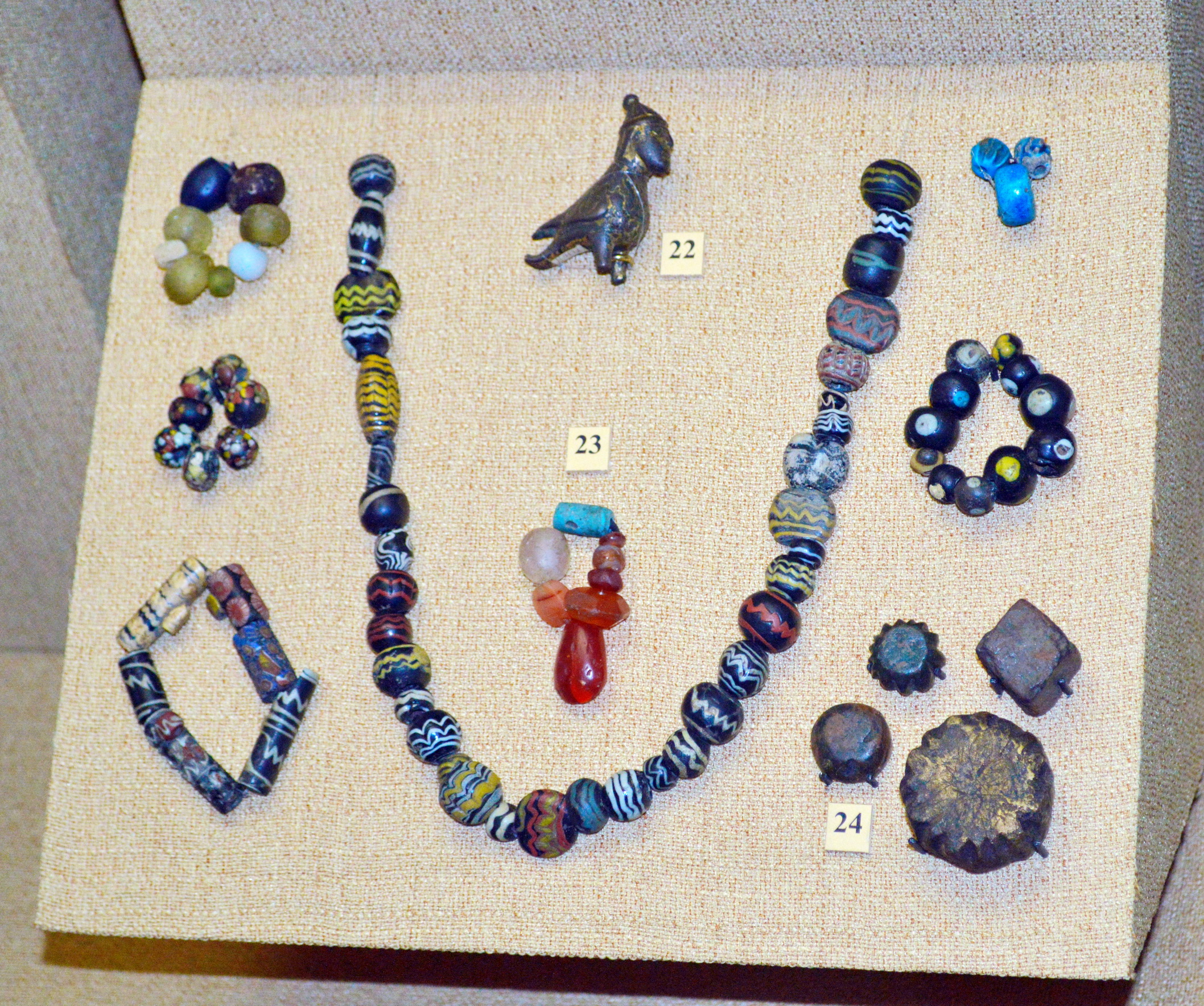
Necklaces, Volga Bulgaria, 10-14 century.

== See also ==
- Bulgarian epigraphic monuments
- Timeline of Turks (500-1300)
- Atil
- Balymer
- Khanate of Kazan
- Qol Ghali
- Siege of Bilär
- Battle of Samara Bend
- Tatars
- Old Great Bulgaria
- Huns
- Girey-kala
