= Şilki =

Ruler of Volga Bulgaria

Şilki (pronounced [ʃilˈki]) or Šilki or Shilki, or possibly Jilki (posthumously Islamized as ˁAbdallāh; mid 9th to beginning of the 10th century) was a Volga Bulgarian ruler (iltäbär). According to the controversial History of Jaˁfar, Şilki was a descendant of Kubrat of "Old Great Bulgaria" (see genealogy below) according to the tradition that Volga Bulgaria was established by Kubrat's son, Kotrag. Şilki is credited with promoting the unification of the Bulgar tribes in the area, but the events of his reign are obscure or unverifiable. He is sometimes assumed to have initiated the conversion of the Volga Bulgars to Islam. His son Almış, the most famous Volga Bulgar ruler, was a Muslim and received a caliphal embassy led by Aḥmad ibn Faḍlān. Almış was given the new Muslim name Jaˁfar ibn ˁAbdallāh (i.e., Jaˁfar, son of ˁAbdallāh), which in turn has led to the belief that Şilki bore the Muslim name ˁAbdallāh. However, "son of ˁAbdallāh" was a traditional filiation given to new converts to Islam (like the Mamluks of Egypt), replacing the name of their non-Muslim fathers with the name of the father of the Islamic prophet Muḥammad.

== Genealogy ==
- Kubrat
- Kotrag
- Timer (Juraš) – only in History of Jaˁfar
- Sulabi – only in History of Jaˁfar
- Ayyar – only in History of Jaˁfar
- Tat Utyak – only in History of Jaˁfar
- Kan Qarajar – only in History of Jaˁfar
- Ugïr Aydar – only in History of Jaˁfar
- Şilki

== See also ==
- List of rulers of Volga Bulgaria
