= Almış =

Ruler of Volga Bulgaria

- Ruler of Volga Bulgaria
- Reign: 9th century – beginning of 10th
- Died: 925?
- Father: Şilki
- Religion: Sunni Islam

Almış or Almuš (Almysh Elteber, Almish Yiltawar, Arabic: ألمش بن يلطوار, pronounced [ʌlˈmɯʃ], fl. end of 9th century – beginning of 10th), iltäbär of the Volga Bulgars, is believed to have been the first Muslim ruler (emir) of Volga Bulgaria.

Almış was a son of Şilki ([ʃilˈki]). He ruled the Volga Bulgars, probably from Bolghar, in c. 895-925. According to the controversial History of Jaˁfar, Almış was a younger son of Şilki, and had succeeded his older brother Bat Ugïr as ruler. The same text identifies Almış with Álmos, the father of the Hungarian prince Árpád; this is perhaps unlikely despite the close correspondence of the names and the approximate synchronicity, although the Bulgars and Hungarians are believed to have shared some common Hunnic and/or Onoghuric elements in their origins. Initially a vassal of the Khazars, Almış struggled to assert the independence and unity of the Bulgar tribes in the area. Perhaps in part to do so more effectively, he sought to convert to Islam and sent ambassadors to the Abbasid caliph at Baghdad, seeking proper instruction in Islam and builders to erect a proper mosque. In 922, the caliph al-Muqtadir's ambassador Aḥmad ibn Faḍlān reached Bolghar and met with Almış. The Abbasid caliphate became an ally of Volga Bulgaria. Almış adopted the Islamic name Jaʿfar ibn ʿAbdallāh (Latin Tatar: Cäğfär bine Ğabdulla, Arabic script: جعفر ابن عبدالله). It is generally believed that during the reign of Almış, Volga Bulgaria developed into a united, strong and independent state. However, apart from his culturally and religiously significant conversion to Islam, the account of Aḥmad ibn Faḍlān makes Almış the only Volga Bulgaran ruler about whom we have a relative wealth of information from surviving contemporary sources. Even so, we know little that is verifiable about his reign.

Aḥmad ibn Faḍlān makes reference to brothers, wives, and children of Almış; two of his daughters were married, respectively, to the Khazar khaghan and to the ruler of the Esegel; a son was named Aḥmad in honor of Aḥmad ibn Faḍlān. According to the controversial History of Jaˁfar, Almış was succeeded in turn by two of his sons, Ḥasan (c. 925-930) and Mīkāˀīl (c. 930-943).

Aḥmad ibn Faḍlān, the caliphal ambassador, has left an account of his journey to and meeting with Almış, describing him as "the king of the Saqaliba".

== Genealogy ==
- Kubrat
- Kotrag
- Timer (Juraš) - only in History of Jaˁfar
- Sulabi - only in History of Jaˁfar
- Ayyar - only in History of Jaˁfar
- Tat Utyak - only in History of Jaˁfar
- Kan Qarajar - only in History of Jaˁfar
- Ugïr Aydar - only in History of Jaˁfar
- Şilki
- Almış

== See also ==
- List of rulers of Volga Bulgaria
