= Ridawiya Library, MS 5229 =

13th-century manuscript

MS 5229 is a 13th-century (7th century Hijra) manuscript, 210 folia (420 pages), kept in Astane Quds Museum (موزهٔ آستان قدس رضوی), Mashhad. It was discovered in 1923 in Mashhad by Turkic scholar Ahmed Zeki Validi Togan. It contains a collection of medieval Arabic geographical treatises, most notably the 10th-century account of Ibn Fadlan of his embassy to the Volga Bulgars.

== Contents ==
- Ibn al-Faqih: aẖbar al-buldan "Exploration of the lands" (p. 1)
- Abu Dulaf: ar-risalatu-l-ūla "First relation" (p. 347)
- Abu Dulaf: ar-risalatu-ṯ-ṯnaniat "Second relation" (p. 362)
- Ibn Fadlan: ma šahidat fi baladi-t-turk wa al-ẖazar wa ar-rus wa aṣ-ṣaqalibat wa al-bašġird wa ġirham "Account of the lands of the Turks, the Khazars, the Rus, the Saqaliba, the Bashkhirs" (p. 390)

== Editions and reproductions ==
- Togan, Ahmed Zeki Validi, Ibn Fadlan's Reisebericht (Leipzig: Kommissionsverlag F. A. Brockhaus, 1939) [edition, from Razawi Library MS 5229, and German translation, of Ibn Fadlān's text]
- Kovalevskii, A. P., Kniga Akhmeda Ibn-Fadlana o ego Puteschestvii na Volgu 921-922 gg (Kharkov, 1956). [Includes photographic reproduction of Ibn Fadlān's text in Razawi Library MS 5229.]
- al-Faqih, Ibn; Aḥmad ibn Muḥammad; Aḥmad Ibn Faḍlān; Misʻar Ibn Muhalhil Abū Dulaf al-Khazrajī; Fuat Sezgin; M. Amawi; A. Jokhosha; E. Neubauer (1987). Collection of Geographical Works: Reproduced from MS 5229 Riḍawīya Library, Mashhad. Frankfurt am Main: I. H. A. I. S. at the Johann Wolfgang Goethe University. OCLC 469349123.
