= List of rulers of Volga Bulgaria =

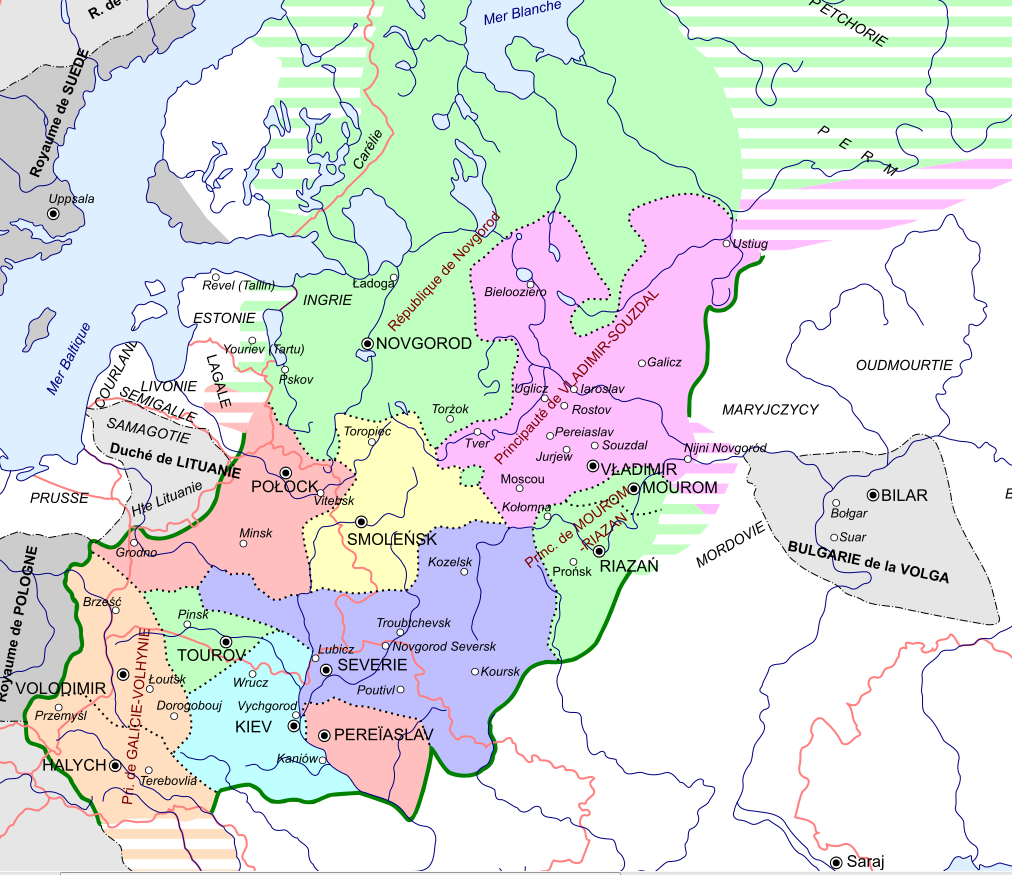
Volga Bulgaria (east) and Kievan Rus' (west) on the eve of the Mongol invasions

Volga Bulgaria was a state in modern-day southwestern Russia, formed by the descendants of a group of Bulgars distinct from those who under Asparuh crossed the Danube river and formed the First Bulgarian Empire (c. 680–1018). The Volga Bulgarians were for much of their early history, until the tenth century, under the suzerainty of the Khazar Khaganate.

No medieval records from Volga Bulgaria itself have survived; its history is instead a reconstruction largely based on information drawn from contemporary Russian, Arabic and Persian sources. According to later legend, the founder of Volga Bulgaria was the 7th-century ruler Kotrag, a son of Kubrat, though modern historians consider his historicity doubtful. The process of unification and state formation in Volga Bulgaria appears to have begun at some point in the late 9th century; Volga Bulgaria emerges from obscurity in the sources in the early 10th century, already a state of some size.

In the early tenth century, the Volga Bulgarian ruler Almış converted to Islam and worked to achieve independence from the Khazars; by 950, Volga Bulgaria was a fully independent state. The conversion to Islam helped the Volga Bulgarian rulers to distance themselves both from the Khazars (which followed Judaism) and the Byzantine Empire (which followed Christianity and was allied with the Khazars). Volga Bulgaria endured until it was conquered by the Mongol Empire in 1236.

== List of rulers ==
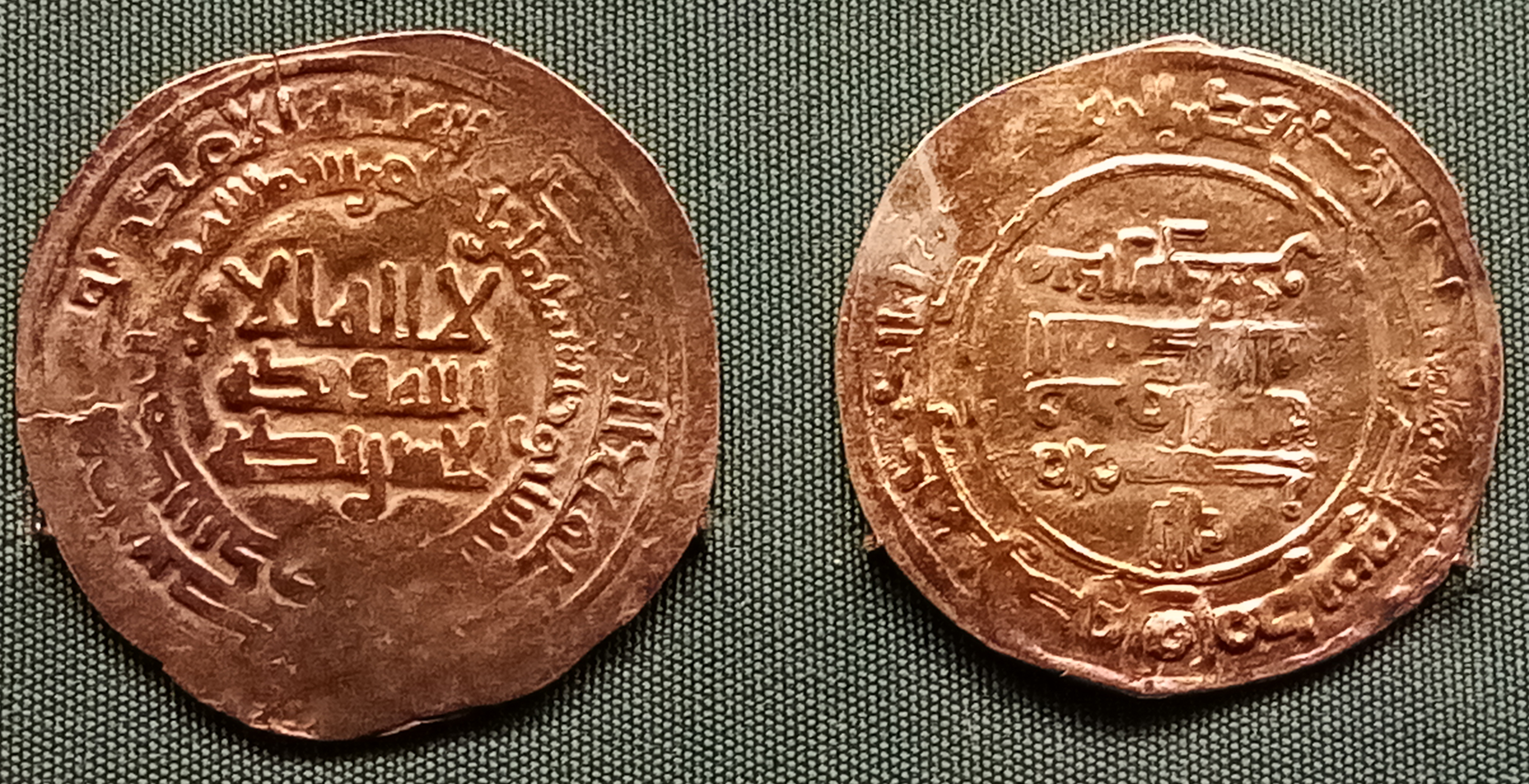
Dirhams minted by Mikaʾil ibn Jaʿfar (early/late 940s)

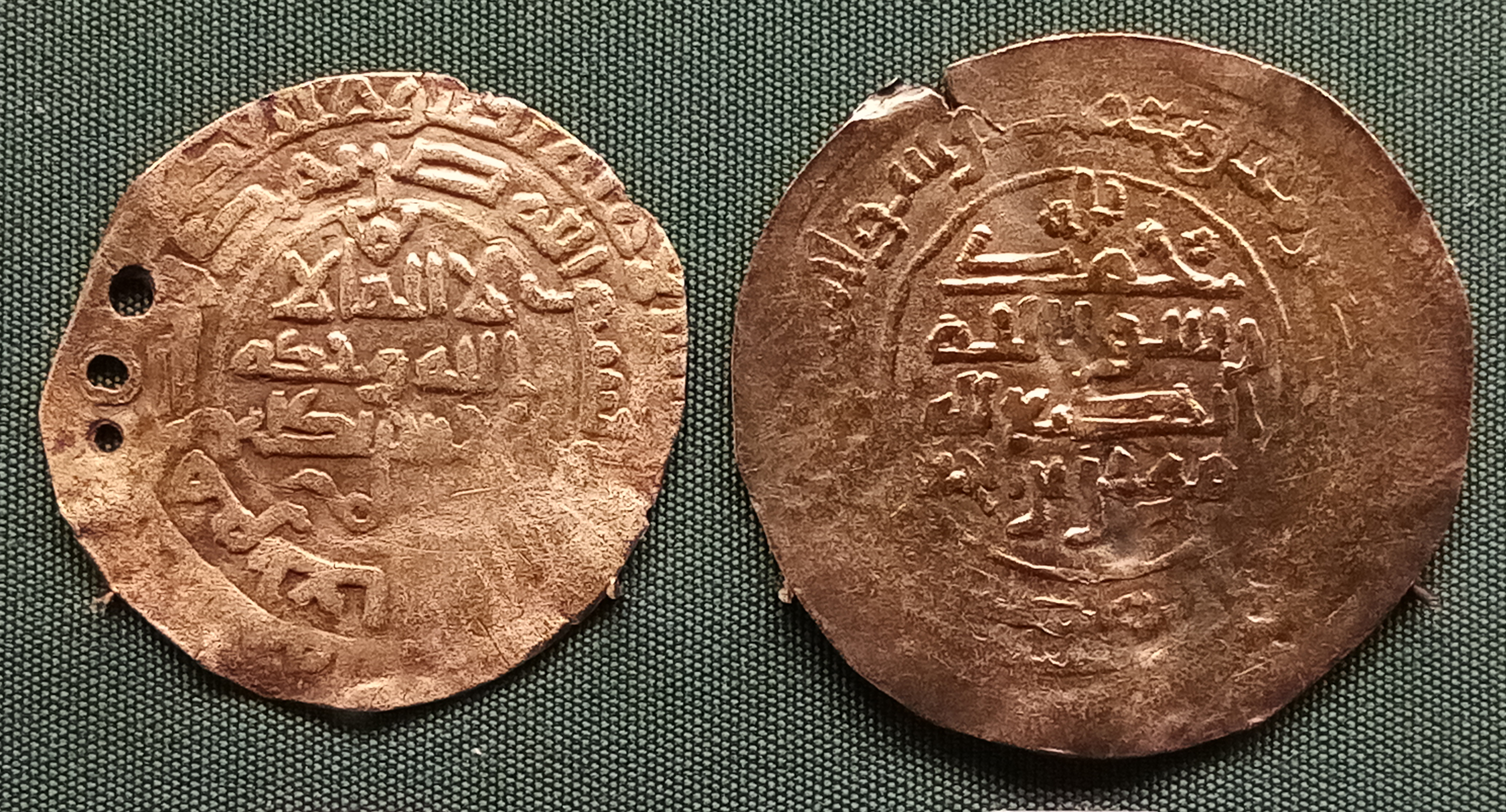
Dirhams minted by Muʾmin ibn al-Hasan (c. 970s)

- Şilki, iltäbär (?), fl. 9th/early 10th century.
- Almış, iltäbär/emir fl. 922. Son of Şilki. Converted to Islam and adopted the Islamic name Jaʿfar ibn ʿAbdallāh. Known from coinage.
- Ahmad ibn Jaʿfar, emir fl. early 10th century. Son and successor of Almış. Known to have visited Baghdad in 932. Appears to have had a short reign.
- Mikaʾil ibn Jaʿfar, emir fl. early or late 940s. Known from coinage.
- Abdallah ibn Mikaʾil, emir fl. middle 10th century. Known from coinage.
- Talib ibn Ahmad, emir fl. middle/late 10th century. Known from coinage.
- Muʾmin ibn Ahmad, emir fl. late 10th century (c. 970s); ruled at Suar. Known from coinage.
- Muʾmin ibn al-Hasan emir fl. late 10th century (c. 970s); ruled at Bolghar. Known from coinage.
- Shamgun, emir 970s?–997. Said to have descended from the Danube Bulgars.
- Khaidar, emir 997–1017. Reportedly had a keen interest in religion, music, and dancing.
- Mukhammad, emir 1017–1032. Son of Khaidar. Deeply religious; oppressed the Christian minorities in Volga Bulgaria.
- Saʾid (or Saghid), emir 1032–1048. Reversed Mukhammad's oppressive religious policies.
- Baradz (or Baraj), emir 1048–1111. The longest-reigning Volga Bulgarian ruler. Childless; abdicated at the age of 90 in favour of his foster-son Ibrahim.
- Ibrahim, emir 1111–1164. Foster-son of Baradz. Had at least some Kipchak ancestry.
- Otyak (or Otak), emir 1164–1178.
- Ghabdula Chelbir, emir 1178?–c. 1223. Recorded to have fought the Mongols at the Battle of Samara Bend.
- Ilham Khan (or Ilham), emir fl. 1223–1236. The last ruler of Volga Bulgaria, killed in battle against the Mongols in 1236.

The former territories of Volga Bulgaria were integrated into the Mongol Empire in 1236 and later became part of the lands of the Golden Horde. After the collapse of Mongol rule in the region, much of the old Volga Bulgarian state became part of the new Khanate of Kazan (1438–1552), which in many ways was a continuation of Volga Bulgaria. The rulers of the Khanate of Kazan are listed in the separate list of Kazan khans. After Kazan was conquered by Russia in 1552, Russian rulers sometimes adopted the title "Prince of Bulgharia", in reference to Volga Bulgaria.

== See also ==
- List of Bulgarian monarchs
