= Barsils =

Eurasian tribe

Barsils ~ Barsilts (Greek: Βαρσὴλτ Barsilt; Old Turkic 𐰋𐰼𐰾𐰠 *Bersel or Bärsil/Barsïl; Old Tibetan: Par-sil), were a Turkic semi-nomadic Eurasian tribe. Barsils might be identified with Bagrasik. Barsils are included in the list of steppe people living north of Derbend in the Late Antique Syrian compilation of Zacharias Rhetor, and are also mentioned in documents from the second half of the 6th century in connection with the westward migration of the Eurasian Avars. When the Avars arrived, according to Theophylact Simocatta, "the Barsilt (Barsilians), Onogurs, and Sabirs were struck with horror (...) and honoured the newcomers with brilliant gifts."

In 2017, Singaporean scholar Yang Shao-yun also identified Barsils with the Tiele tribe 白霫 Báixí (< MC *bˠæk̚-ziɪp̚). The Baixi 白霫 were mentioned as simply Xi 霫 in the late 8th-century encyclopaedia Tongdian as a detached stock of Xiongnu who dwelt near the Tungusic Mohe people in former Xianbei lands north of the Yellow River. Baixi could field over 10,000 soldiers, their customs somewhat resembled Göktürks' customs and Baixi's leaders were title irkin, vassals of Eastern Turkic Khagan Xieli (頡利); however, Baixi later sent their irkin to China in the middle of the reign of Emperor Taizong of Tang (~ 636 CE) as a gesture of submission. Much later, the 14th-century chronicle History of Liao associated Baixi 白霫 with the Mongolic Kumo Xi (< MC *kʰuoH-mɑk̚-ɦei; 庫莫奚) in Zhongjing (中京). An 8th-century Old Tibetan list, written by five Tibetan explorers, possibly mentioned 庫莫奚 Kumoxi and 白霫 Baixi together as He-tse (奚霫 Xī-Xí in Liaoshi). However, the same Tibetan source distinguished the He-tse from the Par-sil and included Barsils in twelve Turkic tribes ruled by Qapaghan Qaghan.

Zuev (2002) also pointed out that Chinese records about the Western Turkic Kaganate c. 630 mentioned a tribe named "leopard khan" Barsqan (拔塞幹 MC. *b'uat-sai-kan > Mand. Basaigan), led by Tun-ashpa-[ra]-erkin, a member of five leaders of the "Nushibi" (弩失畢 < OT *Oŋ-Şadapït) right-wing tribes.

In an Armenian geography of the 7th century, the Barsils are described as living on an island, distinct from the Bulgars and Khazars and at odds with both nations. In addition, it describes them as possessing large flocks of sheep, supporting the notion that they were at least partly nomadic. Mikhail Artamonov theorized that "Barsilia" was located in northern Daghestan, but subsequent scholars have disputed this theory, as the sedentary local population of the relevant period and region appears to have been, for the most part, settled in permanent fortress-towns.

Some archaeologists believe that the Barsils lived near the Volga delta, which would explain the Armenian reference to them as island-dwellers. This is supported by Theophanes' statement that the "populous people of the Khazars came out from the innermost parts of Bersilia in Sarmatia Prima." If indeed they lived on the lower Volga, they were almost certainly conquered by the Khazars, whose capital Atil was in the same region from the mid-8th century on.

Eventually at least part of the Barsil nation is believed to have settled in Volga Bulgaria. In the 10th century, ibn Rustah reported that the three nations of Volga Bulgaria were "Bersula", "Esegel", and "Bulgar". Thereafter the Barsils were likely assimilated by the Volga Bulgars.

== See also ==
- Aq Bars
