= Suar, Volga Bulgaria =

Medieval Volga Bulgarian city in Spassky District, Tatarstan, Russia

Suar (Suwar or Suvar) was a medieval (9th - 14th century) Volga Bulgarian city, the capital of Suar Principality in 948–975.

It was situated at Volga's left tributary Ütäk river's upper stream. In the 10th century it coined its own money. Suar was a political, economical and trade center of Volga Bulgaria. After the Mongol invasion of Volga Bulgaria in 1236 the city lost its importance. It is believed that ruins (fortifications, foundations, ruins of palace) are situated in the present day village of Kuzneçixa, Spassky District, Tatarstan.

Dmitriev V.D. believed that the Bulgarian city of Suvar was located on the right bank of the Volga on the Sviyaga River:

Another legend about the right-bank Chuvash says: "...Once the Chuvash lived between the Volga and Sviyaga. They say they lived in dugouts, which is why their villages were invisible. Even their central city consisted of dugouts. Their villages and towns were located among the forests and steppes between the Volga and Sviyaga rivers, they say. Then they were called not Chuvash, but some kind of Suvars. So they were called because they lived in the between the rivers..." Dimitriev V. D. Chuvash Historical legends: Essays on the history of the Chuvash people from ancient times to the middle of the XIX century / The second, expanded edition. — Cheboksary: Chuvash. Book of Publishing, 1993. — page 42.

V. D. Dmitriev believed that the city of Suvar was called that way because it was located between the two rivers Sviyaga and Volga, and the word Suvar itself means Between the rivers, from the turkic Su or chuvash dialect Shu - Water, River and Var - in the middle, in the center, literally "Shuw varrinche" - "In between the river".

The city of Suwar on the map of Muhammad Al Idrisi is marked on the right bank of the Volga as "Sauan".

According to Vasily Dimitrievich, this city was located not far from Ulyanovsk (Simbirsk) in the village of Old Aleikino, marked "on the archaeological map of the Simbirsk Province" as "Moshkovo Settlement", and nearby was the satellite city "Sendyukov settlement" (from the Chuvash "Şĕn Çuk"), as well as nearby was the town of Oshel, a medieval city of Volga Bulgaria, its archaeological remains are located at the Bogdashkinsky settlement, now Tetyushsky district, Republic of Tatarstan.

Near the village of Starago Alekina, the remains of a very ancient town, known in the Kazan scribal books of the village of Volynsk in 1648 under the name of "Moshkov settlement", have been preserved. In 1675, this settlement, together with the adjacent empty land, was given to Grigory and Markel Vasilyevich Galkin, who founded the village of Rozhdestvenskoye (Alekino, Moshkovo-the settlement of the same) here. Past the village of Old Aleikino passed from the villages of Gorodishche and Rastoki Tetyushskaya zaseka in the direction of Kuralovo settlement, which is near the village of Pilyugina on Dry Biryuch. Then the zaseka went to the settlement near the village of Kezmino, and then headed to the village of Promzino Settlement (Alatyrsky district) Polivanov, Vladimir Nikolaevich "Archaeological map of Simbirsk province", pp. 8-9

Ahmad Ibn Fadlan 's notes say - The king of Suvar was called Vayrak:

22 Moving bets on the Javshire River.

The king moved from a reservoir called Hallaja to a river called Javashir,

where he stayed for two months.

Then he [again] wanted to move and sent [a

slannik] to a tribe called Suvar,

inviting them to perform with him. They refused

[submit] and split into two groups.

One of [these groups] was headed by his son-in-law,

whose name was Vayrak, he was their ruler.

The king [of Bulgaria] sent them [a message] saying:

– Indeed, Allah the Great and Mighty

has sent down to me the grace of Islam and

the supremacy of the ruler of believers. I am his slave. These

people recognized my authority, and if someone

contradicts me, I will meet him with a sword!

Another group was headed by the king

of the tribe, who was called the king of the [tribe] Eskel.

He recognized the supremacy of [the king of the Bulgars],

but [by that time] had not yet converted to Islam.

Suar is also spelled as Sugar, but Suvar refers also to Dagestani city, which was founded by Sabirs before the 8th century.

== See also ==
- Bilasuvar Rayon
