= Ibn al-Faqih =

10th-century Persian historian and geographer

- Parent: Muḥammad ibn al-Faqih

Academic work
- Era: Islamic Golden Age
- Main interests: Islamic geography
- Notable works: Mukhtasar Kitab al-Buldan ("Concise Book of Lands")

Aḥmad ibn Muḥammad ibn al-Faqīh al-Hamadāni (Persian: احمد بن محمد ابن فقيه همدانی) (fl. 902) was a 10th-century Persian historian and geographer, famous for his Mukhtasar Kitab al-Buldan ("Concise Book of Lands") written in Arabic.

In the 1870s the Dutch orientalist Michael Jan de Goeje edited a selection of geography works of Arab geographers in an eight-volume series titled Bibliotheca geographorum Arabicorum published by Lugduni-Batavae (Leiden) Brill publishers. Al-Hamadhānī's Mukhtasar Kitab al-Buldan was published in volume 5 of this series.

In 1967 second editions were printed by Dar Sadir (Beirut) and E.J. Brill (Lugduni Batavorum).

== See also ==
- Manuscript 5229

== Sources ==
- Ibn al-Fakih al-Hamadhānī (1870), Goeje, M. J. de (ed.), "Compendium libri Kitāb Al-Boldān auctore Ibn al-Fakih al-Hamadhānī", Bibliotheca geographorum Arabicorum (in Arabic and Latin), 5, Lugdunum Batavorum (Leiden): Brill
