= Central Library of Astan Quds Razavi =

Library in Mashhad, Iran

Coordinates: 36.3150°N 59.4894°E

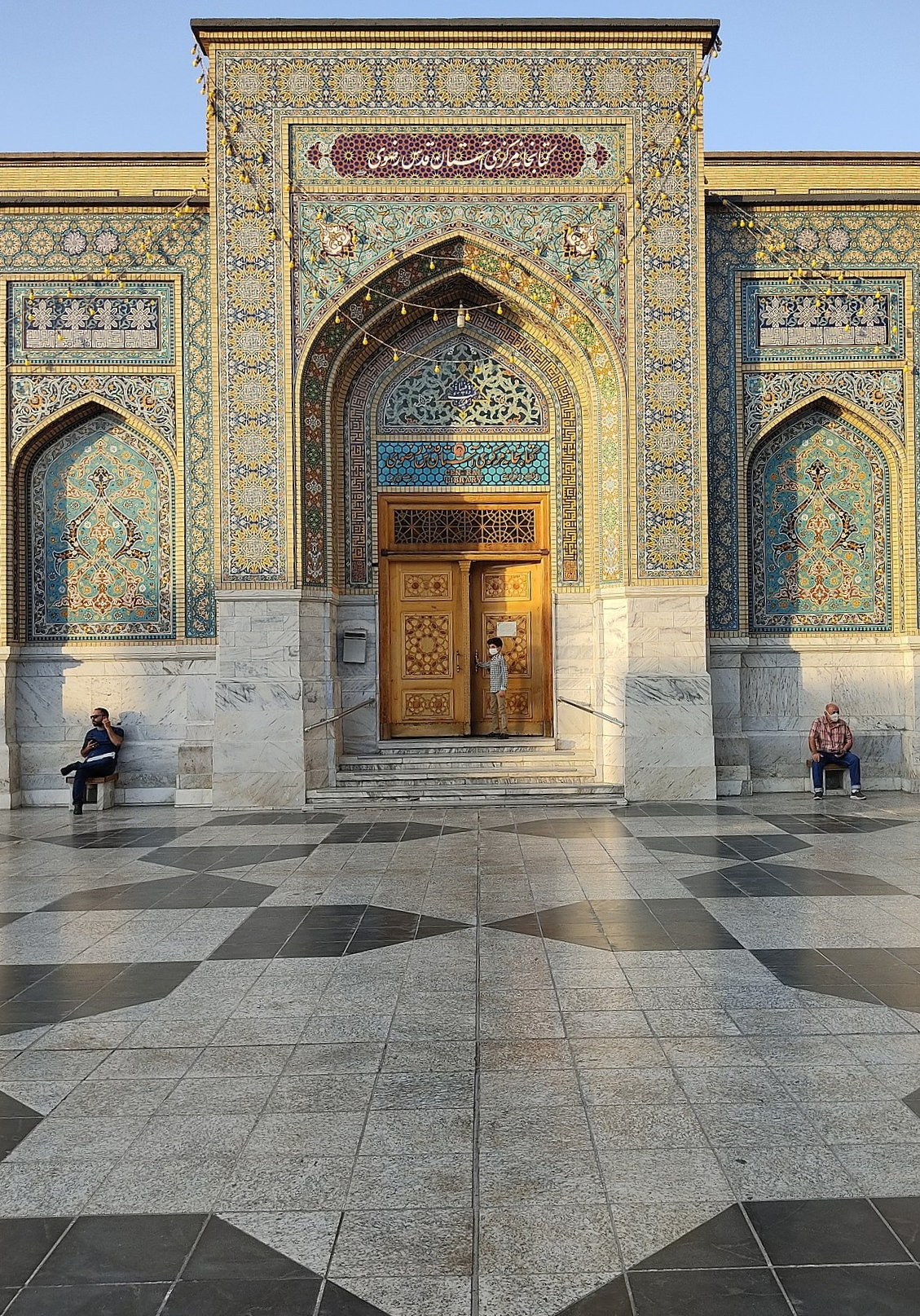

The Central Library of Astan Quds Razavi (Persian: کتابخانه مرکزی آستان قدس رضوی) is a library in Mashhad, Iran. Established before 1457, it holds over 1.1 million volumes. It is an international center for Islamic research, containing numerous manuscripts and rare works of antiquity of Islamic history.

== Branches ==
The library has 35 branches:

- 17 libraries in Mashhad, Iran.
- 5 libraries in Khorasan province.
- 12 libraries in other cities of Iran.
- 1 library in India.

It contains around 3 million digital information sources, including manuscripts, lithographic prints, movable type prints, historic documents, image sources, maps, and treatises.

== History ==
There is no information about the exact date of the establishment of the library of Astan Quds Razvi. Some consider the endowment date (974 AD) of the oldest Quran to the Imam Reza shrine by a person called Ali Ibn Simjour, as the year of establishment date of the library of Astan Quds Razvi (or recitation place of Quran). It can also be assumed from some extant documents concerning the endowments that the library was open to the public and used by them in 1457 AD. From about 1737 AD, a special place was allocated to the library but a serious attention was paid to it in the early period of 20th century. However, an increasing inclination of using the library by the researches and scholars, prompted a faster growth to the library.

Although the location of the library has been changed many times over years, it has always remained in the vicinity of the Holy Shrine.

== Features ==
The construction of the present building was completed in 1995, with a constructed area of 28,800 square meters and was opened to the public in 1995. Some of the outstanding features of the complex are as follows:

- Affiliation of the complex to the shrine of Imam Reza
- Manuscripts of very long life, artifacts and museum objects, dating back 1000 years.
- Copies of Qur'an, manuscripts, and printed books.
- A collection of printed books in different fields.
- facilities and technologies.
- A collection of documents and serials.

The number of manuscripts held by the library in 2003 was 30,250 volumes, 25,000 of earlier lithographic books, 17,240 other handwritten materials; 72,490 volumes in total.

== The Bureau of Museums of Astan Quds ==
Affiliated with the library are eleven different museums which are located in different buildings near each other. They collectively form the Astan Quds Razavi Central Museum:

- The Museum of Qur'an and Precious Objects
- The Museum of precious objects donated by the Supreme Leader of the Islamic Republic of Iran
- The specialized Museum of Carpets
- The Museum of Armaments
- The Museum of Astronomical Tools and Clocks
- The Museum of Coins and Medals
- The Museum of the History of Mashhad
- The Museum of pottery and glassware
- The Museum of fine arts
- The Museum of Stamps and Banknotes
- The Museum of Shellfishes and Mollusks

The bureau of museums maintains an office for the preservation and repair of historical objects of the Museum and library by a technical staff of specialists.

== See also ==
- Mashhad
- Ayatollah al-Shirazi, one of the benefactors of the library.
- National Library of Iran
- MS 5229
- Ahmad ibn Fadlan
