= Qashan =

Medieval Volga Bulgarian city in Laishevsky District, Tatarstan, Russia

Qashan (Tatar: Кашан, romanized: Qaşan) was a medieval city in Volga Bulgaria, on the right bank of Kama river from the 12th to the 15th century.

== History ==
In the 12th and 13th centuries, it was one of the administrative and political centres of the Lower Kama region of Volga Bulgaria.

In the 14th century it became a capital of the Qashan Duchy. In 1391, it was destroyed by the ushkuiniki, Russian river pirates, and finally in 1399 by Muscovite troops.

The ruins are situated near the present-day village of Shuran in Laishevsky District of Tatarstan.

== See also ==
- Keşan
