= Suar, Uttar Pradesh =

Suar
- city
- Location in Uttar Pradesh, India Suar (India)
- Coordinates: 29.027°N 79.057°E
- Country: India
- State: Uttar Pradesh
- District: Rampur

Government
  - MLA: Shafeek Ahmed Ansari
- Elevation: 214 m (702 ft)

Population (2001)
  - Total: 26,142

Languages
  - Official: Hindi
- Time zone: UTC+5:30 (IST)
- Vehicle registration: UP
- Website: up.gov.in

Suar is a city and a municipal board in Rampur district in the Indian state of Uttar Pradesh.

== Geography ==
Suar is located at 29.027°N 79.057°E. It has an average elevation of 214 metres (702 feet).

== Demographics ==
As of the 2001 Census of India, Suar had a population of 26,142. Males constitute 53% of the population and females 47%. Suar has an average literacy rate of 28%, lower than the national average of 59.5%: male literacy is 34%, and female literacy is 20%. In Suar, 19% of the population is under 6 years of age.
