= Aşlı =

Medieval Volga Bulgarian city

Coordinates: 54°49′17″N 48°44′07″E

Ashli or Aşlı (cv. Аскиль trn.Askil, Tatar: Ашлы; pronounced [ʌʃˈlɯ]) was a mysterious medieval Volga Bulgarian town. In Russian chronicles it is known as Oshel (Russian: Ошель).

Whereas archaeological excavations prove that the city appeared as early as the 11th century, the Tatar legends and the Russian Tver Chronicle state that the city was founded by Alexander the Great. At its heyday Ashli was a major trade and political centre. In 1220 it was ruined and burned by the troops of Sviatoslav III of Vladimir. The Tver Chronicle is the only written source where Ashli is mentioned.

== Downfall ==
The downfall of the city is mentioned in the Tver Chronicle, the only written mention of the city. The prince of Vladimir Yuri Vsevolodovich sent the expedition to sack Ashli under his brother, Sviatoslav.

The Russians under prince Sviatoslav, his brother Yaroslav and voyevoda Yeremey Glebovich reached the city by the Volga on their boats. They landed to the east of the city at the flat bank of the Volga. The Rostovans formed the right flank, the Pereslavleans the left, the prince and the Muromeans stayed in the center. One regiment stayed to protect the boats. The Russians came across the forest and met the horseback Bulgars under their prince. Bulgars shot their arrows and retreated to the citadel.

The Russians reached the walls in a harsh battle and managed to set a fire at the walls. However the fire, smoke and wind were so strong, that the Russians were forced to retreat and to enter the city from another side. However, Ashli's prince and his cavalry retinue escaped under cover of the smoke. However, foot warriors and civilians were killed in action. The fire was so strong that many invaders who dared to enter Ashli to rob the city perished. The Russians took into many civilians captive and retreated by the Volga. Bulgar reinforcements, sent from Bilär, the capital, were too late.

== Search and excavations ==
For a long period there weren't any ruins identified as Ashli. Vasily Tatishchev assumed that the ruins near Yantikovsky (Kirelsky) in what is today Kamsko-Ustyinsky District (Kama-Ustjin District) were the remains of Ashla. Another supporter of this version, A. Smirnov, advanced that the name of the city comes from the Esegel tribe of the Volga Bulgars. Yantikovsky's ruins were flooded with the infill of the Kuybyshev Reservoir in the 1950s, however, they were totally explored. There weren't scents of the mentioned great fire in Yantikovsky ruins.

Today the ruins are assumed to be near the village of Bogodashkino, Tetyushsky District. Bogdashkino is a village located on the upper course of the Kilna River, between Proley-Kasha and Iokovo villages, about five kilometres north of Uryum village, on the land which is inhabited by Tetyushi Mordvins, about 16 kilometres south-west of Tetyushi. The Bogodashkino ruins were found in 1909 by Ğäynetdin Äxmärev and the excavations took place in 1949-1950 under Nikolay Kalinin. He also excavated Yantikovsky's ruins and decided that Ashli was situated near Bogodashkino. The remains of the fortress, the apartments, workshops, pottery and foundry were unearthed. The Muslim burial ground found there dates back to the 11-13th centuries. The last expeditions of 1987 and 2003 provided good material for historians.

== Controversial theories ==
Some Cäğfär Taríxı-based versions place Aşlı in the modern Kazan and state the victory of Bulgars under Gabdulla Chelbir and defeat of the Russians and the Udmurts.
