= Omut =

Omut Омут
- Village
- Location within Vologda Oblast Location within Russia
- Coordinates: 60°13′N 45°06′E
- Country: Russia
- Region: Vologda Oblast
- District: Kichmengsko-Gorodetsky District
- Time zone: UTC+3:00

Omut (Russian: Омут) is a rural locality (a village) in Gorodetskoye Rural Settlement, Kichmengsko-Gorodetsky District, Vologda Oblast, Russia. The population was 38 as of 2002.

== Geography ==
Omut is located 60 km northwest of Kichmengsky Gorodok (the district's administrative centre) by road. Podol is the nearest rural locality.
