= Balymer complex =

Archaeological complex near Balymer, Tatarstan, Russian Federation

Coordinates: 54.86°N 48.96°E

The Balymer complex is an archaeological complex near the village of Balymer (Балымер), Spassky District, Tatarstan, Russian Federation. The former trade emporium on the Volga trade route covers an area of 4 km^{2}. It was first explored in 1870 by A. I. Stoyanov.

The settlement, graves and tumuli belonged to the Volga Bulgars or the Volga Vikings (Rus' people) in the 9th-10th centuries, and to the Golden Horde nomads in the 13th-14th centuries. There is also ample evidence of the Ananyino and Imenkovo cultures, i.e. Finno-Ugric peoples.
