= Suar Principality =

10th-century vassal state of Volga Bulgaria

Suar or Suvar principality was a medieval statelet subject to Volga Bulgaria.

The principality appeared around the 940s CE. The population was a mix of Turkic Sabirs and local Turkic- and Uralic-speaking tribes such as the Mari. The capital city was Suar, whose ruler was titled "Bäk" (cf. Khazar "Bek"; Turkish "Bey".)

In 975 the principality was absorbed by Volga Bulgaria. From the 11th to 13th centuries, it was a semiautonomous province, until the Mongols conquered the state.

== List of known rulers ==
- Ghabdulla bine Miqail (Abd'ullah ibn Miqa'il)
- Talib bine Axmad (Talib ibn Ahmad)
- Mo'min bine Axmad (Mu'min ibn Ahmad)

== Bibliography ==
- "Suar bäklege". Tatar Encyclopaedia (in Tatar). Kazan: The Republic of Tatarstan Academy of Sciences. Institution of the Tatar Encyclopaedia. 2002.
