= Zyuri =

Rural locality in Mamadış District, Tatarstan

Coordinates: 55°56′42″N 51°21′4″E

Zyuri (Russian: Зюри́; Tatar: Җөри, Cöri, [ʑœˈri]) is a village (selo) in Mamadyshsky District, Republic of Tatarstan, Russia, located 34 km south of Mamadysh, district's administrative center. The village is situated on the Yukache River of the Vyatka basin. Population: 467 (2000), 507 (1989); all ethnic Tatars. The main occupations of the residents are agriculture and beekeeping.

In the 19th century, Cöri was prominent for its bast whisp handicrafts.
