= Ahmad ibn Rustah =

10th-century Persian explorer and geographer

- Born: Rosta, Isfahan, Abbasid Caliphate (modern-day Iran)
- Occupations: Explorer; geographer; writer
- Writing career
- Language: Arabic
- Period: 10th century
- Genres: Travel literature, Geography
- Notable work: Kitāb al-A‘lāq al-Nafīsa (Book of Precious Records)

Ahmad ibn Rusta Isfahani (Persian: احمد ابن رسته اصفهانی, romanized: Aḥmad ibn Rusta Iṣfahānī), more commonly known as ibn Rusta (ابن رسته, also spelled ibn Roste), was a tenth-century Muslim Persian explorer and geographer born in Rosta, Isfahan in the Abbasid Caliphate. He wrote a geographical compendium known as the Kitāb al-A‘lāq al-Nafīsa (Arabic: كتاب الأعلاق النفيسة, lit. 'Book of Precious Records').

The information on Isfahan is especially extensive and valuable. Ibn Rusta states that, while for other lands he had to depend on second-hand reports, often acquired with great difficulty and with no means of checking their veracity, for Isfahan he could use his own experience and observations or statements from others known to be reliable. Thus we have a description of the twenty districts (rostaqs) of Isfahan containing details not found in other geographers' works. Concerning the town itself, we learn that it was perfectly circular in shape, with a circumference of half a parasang, walls defended by a hundred towers, and four gates.

== Recorded information ==
His information on the non-Islamic peoples of Europe and Inner Asia makes him a useful source for these obscure regions (he was even aware of the existence of the British Isles and of the Heptarchy of Anglo-Saxon England) and for the prehistory of the Turks and other steppe peoples.

He traveled to Novgorod with the Rus' and compiled books relating his own travels, as well as second-hand knowledge of the Khazars, Magyars, Slavs, Bulgars and other peoples.

- He wrote of a 10th-century city of the Rus':

"As for the Rus, they live on an island … that takes three days to walk round and is covered with thick undergrowth and forests; … They harry the Slavs, using ships to reach them; they carry them off as slaves and … sell them. They have no fields but simply live on what they get from the Slav's lands … When a son is born, the father will go up to the newborn baby, sword in hand; throwing it down, he says, 'I shall not leave you with any property: You have only what you can provide with this weapon.'"

His impression of the Rus' seemed to be very favorable:

"They carry clean clothes and the men adorn themselves with bracelets and gold. They treat their slaves well and also they carry exquisite clothes, because they put great effort in trade. They have many towns. They have a most friendly attitude towards foreigners and strangers who seek refuge."

This is in contrast to the account of Ibn Fadlan and other Arab authors, whose views on hygiene (based on Islamic hygienical jurisprudence) contrasted with that of the Rus'. However, the word clean initially appeared in the first Russian translation of Ibn Rustah by professor Daniel Chwolson (who also misspelled his name as Ibn Dasta(h)). Consecutive Russian editions of Chwolson's translation include a footnote saying that the Arabic original clearly says the opposite, unclean or impure, and suggesting that Chwolson made such a correction intentionally, out of a remote concern that modern Russians might be offended by such characteristic.

- Of ancient Croatia he wrote in the chronicle Al-Djarmi:

"Their ruler is crowned … He dwells in the midst of the Slavs … He bears the title of 'ruler of rulers' and is called 'sacred king'. He is more powerful than the Zupan (viceroy), who is his deputy … His capital is called Drzvab where is held a fair of three days every month."

- About a certain king of the Caucasus Ibn Rustah wrote:

"He prayed on Fridays with the Muslims, on Saturdays with the Jews and on Sundays with the Christians. 'Since each religion claims that it is the only true one and that the others are invalid', the king explained, 'I have decided to hedge my bets.'"

- He also travelled extensively in Arabia and is one of the early Persian explorers to describe the city of Sanaa. In his Book of Precious Records, he writes:

"It is the city of Yemen — there not being found in the highland or the Tihama or the Hijaz a city greater, more populous or more prosperous, of more noble origin or more delicious food than it. … San'a is a populous city with fine dwellings, some above others, but most of them are decorated with plaster, burned bricks and dressed stones."

== Translations ==
Абу-Али Ахмед Бен Омар Ибн-Даста. Известия о хозарах, буртасах, болгарах, мадьярах, славянах и руссах. — СПб.: тип. Императорской Академии Наук, 1869. [Russian translation.]

== Literature ==
- Bosworth, Clifford Edmund (1997). "EBN ROSTA, ABŪ ʿALĪ AḤMAD". Encyclopaedia Iranica, Vol. VIII, Fasc. 1. pp. 49–50.
- Abū Alā Ahmed ibn Omar Ibn Rosteh; Ahmed ibn Jakūb ibn Wadhih al-Kātib Al-Jakūbi (1870), Goeje, M. J. de (ed.), "Kitāb Al-A'Lāk An-Nafāsa VII auctore Abū Alā Ahmed ibn Omar Ibn Rosteh et Kitāb Al-Boldān auctore Ahmed ibn Jakūb ibn Wadhih al-Kātib Al-Jakūbi", Bibliotheca Geographorum Arabicorum (in Arabic and Latin), 7, Lugdunum Batavorum (Leiden): Brill
- Ibn Rustah (1892), M. J. De Goeje (ed.), "Kitāb al-A'lāk an-Nafīsa", Bibliotheca Geographorum Arabicorum, Leiden: E. J. Brill
