= Chuvashsky Timerlek =

Rural locality in the Republic of Tatarstan, Russia

Coordinates: 54°37′59″N 50°16′03″E

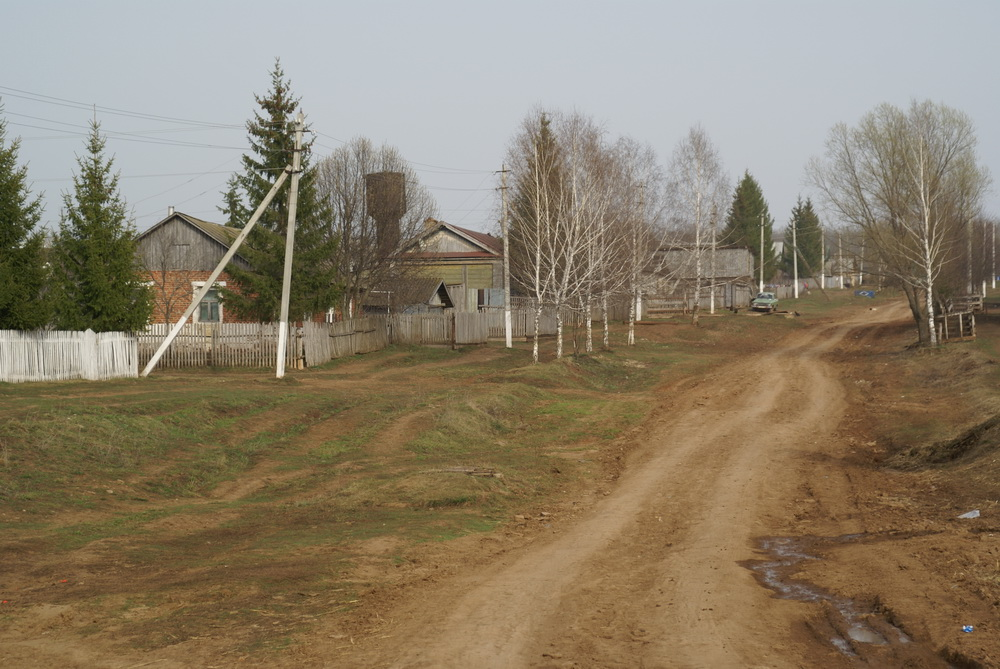
View of Chuvashsky Timerlek

Chuvashsky Timerlek (Russian: Чувашский Тимерлек; Tatar: Чуаш Тимерлеге, Çuaş Timerlege; Chuvash: Чăваш Тĕкĕрмел, Çăvaş Tĕkĕrmel) is a rural locality (a selo) in Nurlatsky District of the Republic of Tatarstan, Russia, located on the Timerlichka River (right tributary of the Bolshoy Cheremshan), 50 kilometers (31 mi) northwest of Nurlat, the administrative center of Nurlatsky District. Population: 469 (1992 est.), predominantly the Chuvash people.

Chuvashsky Timerlek was founded in the 19th century.

There is a secondary school, a kindergarten, and a library, along with two convenience stores, a forestry, and a community center.
