= Kichkalnya =

Kichkalnya Кичкальня

Other transcription(s)
  - Tatar: Кычытканлы (Qıçıtqanlı)
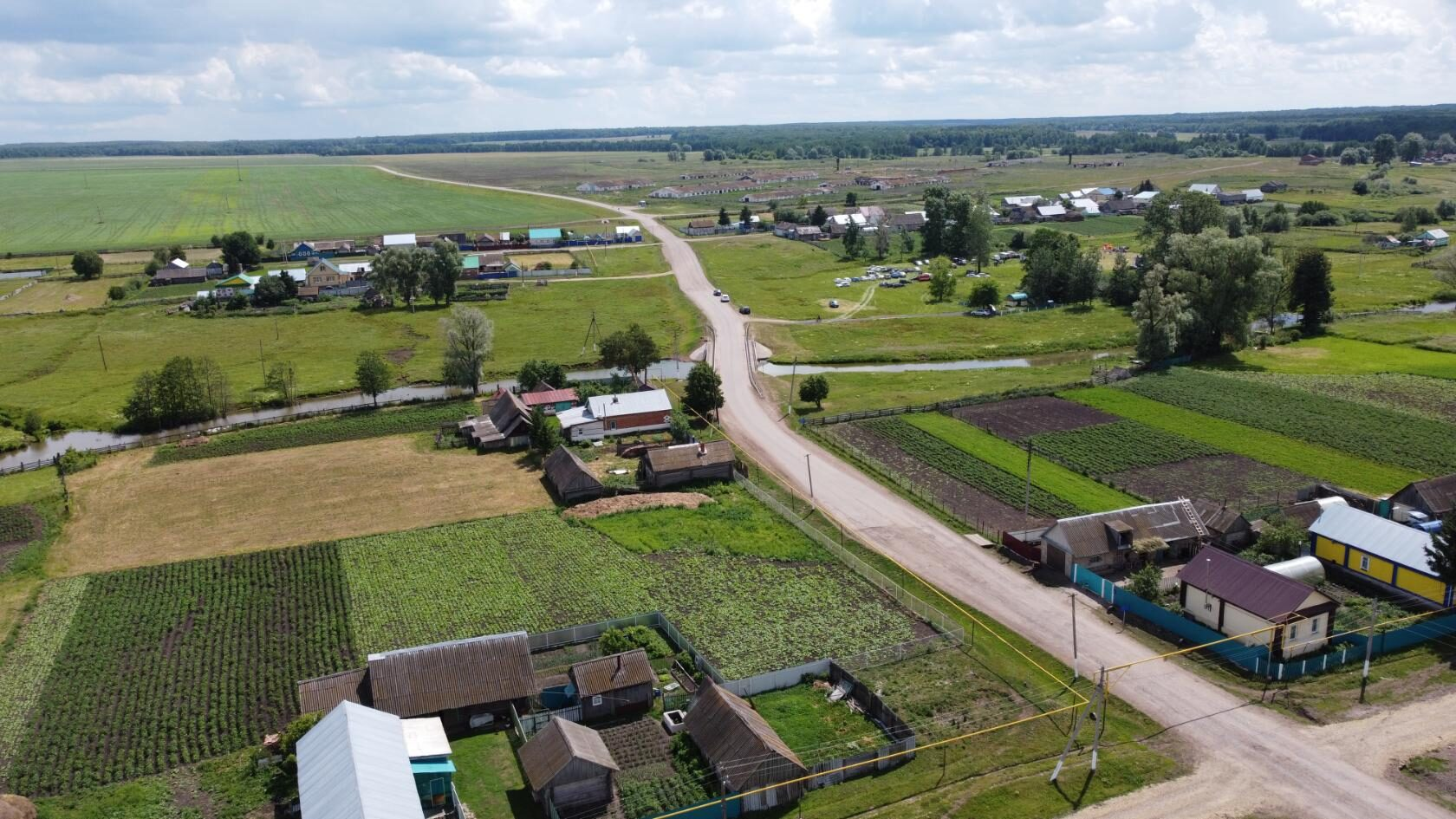
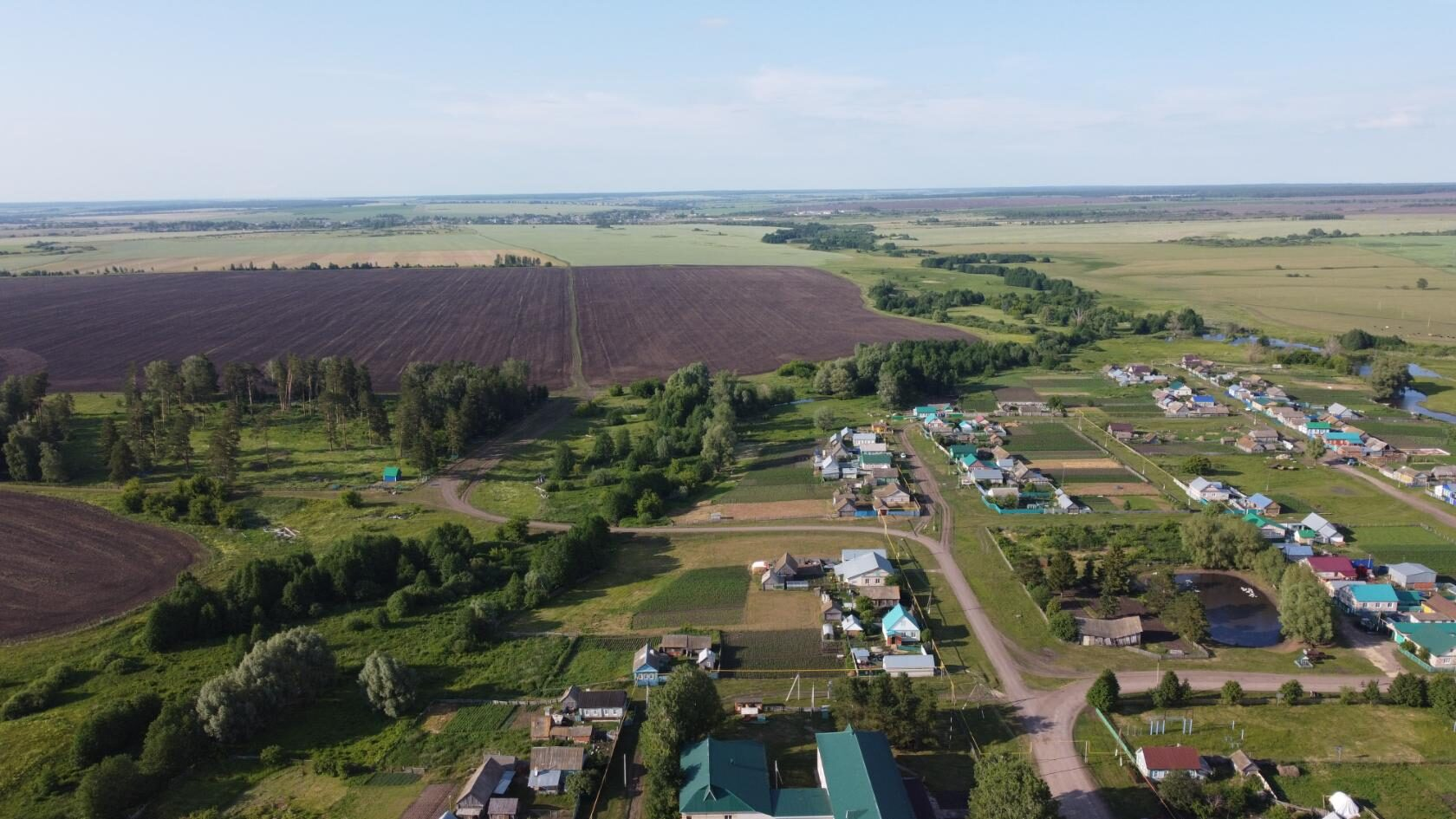
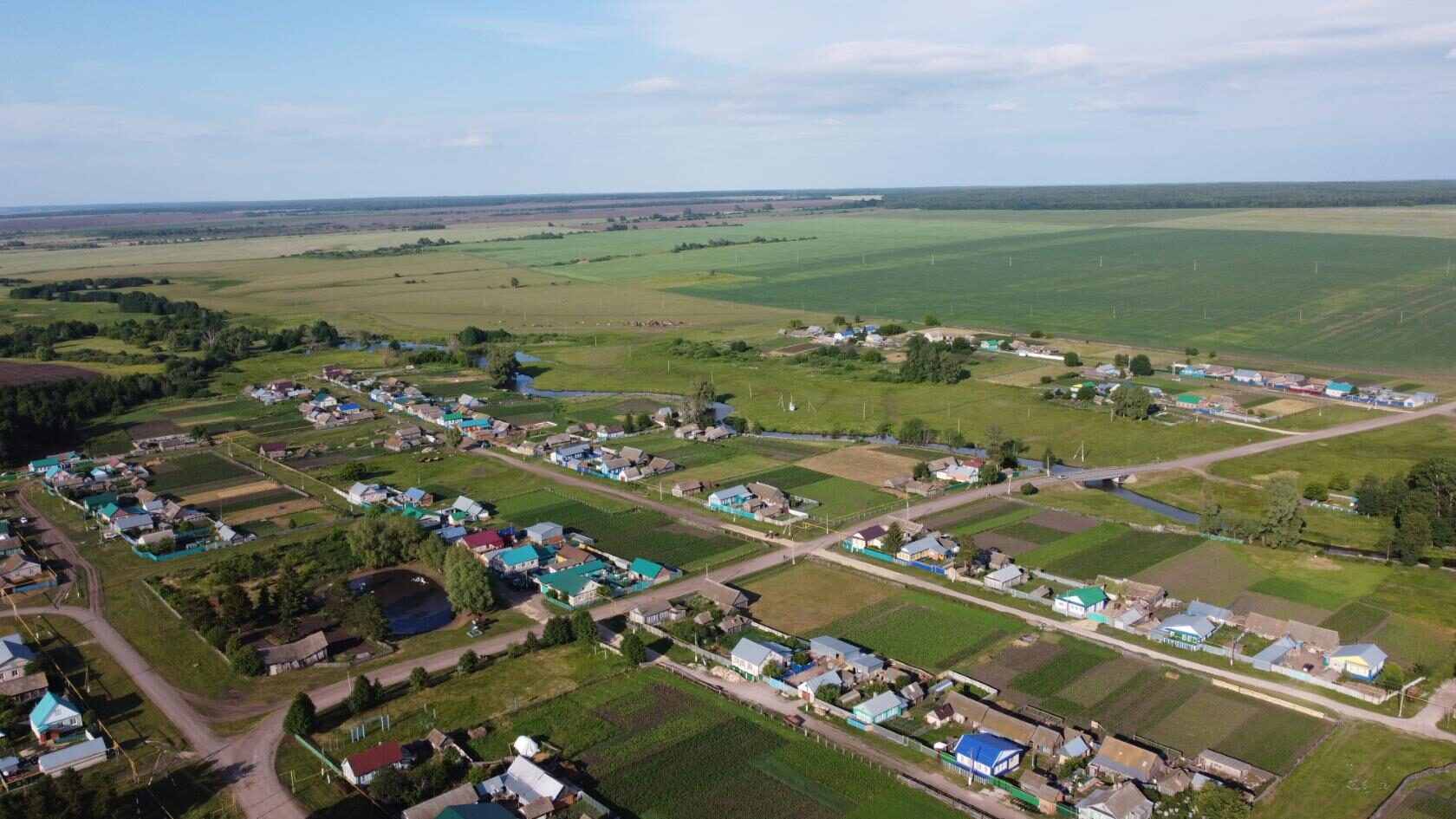
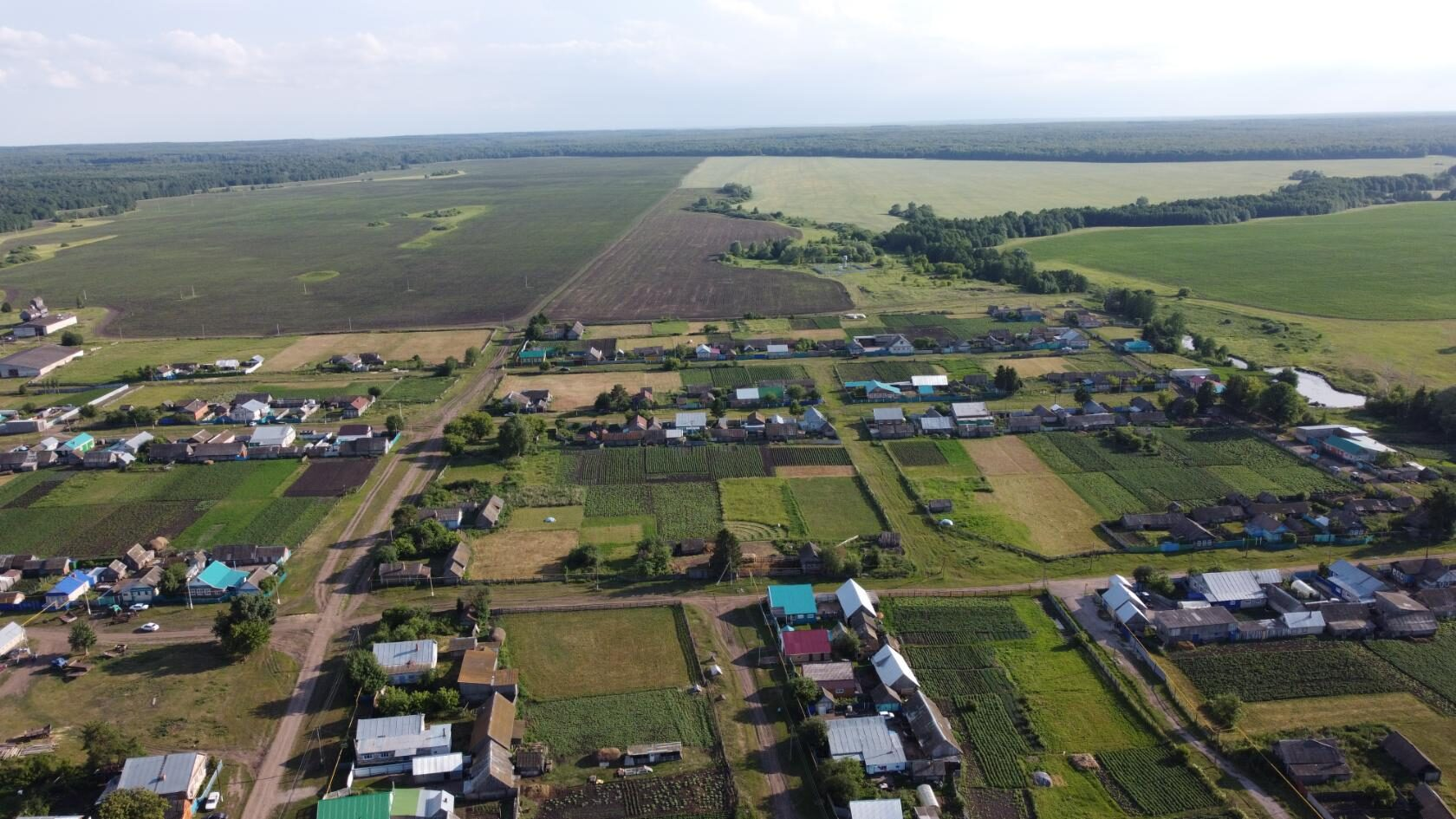
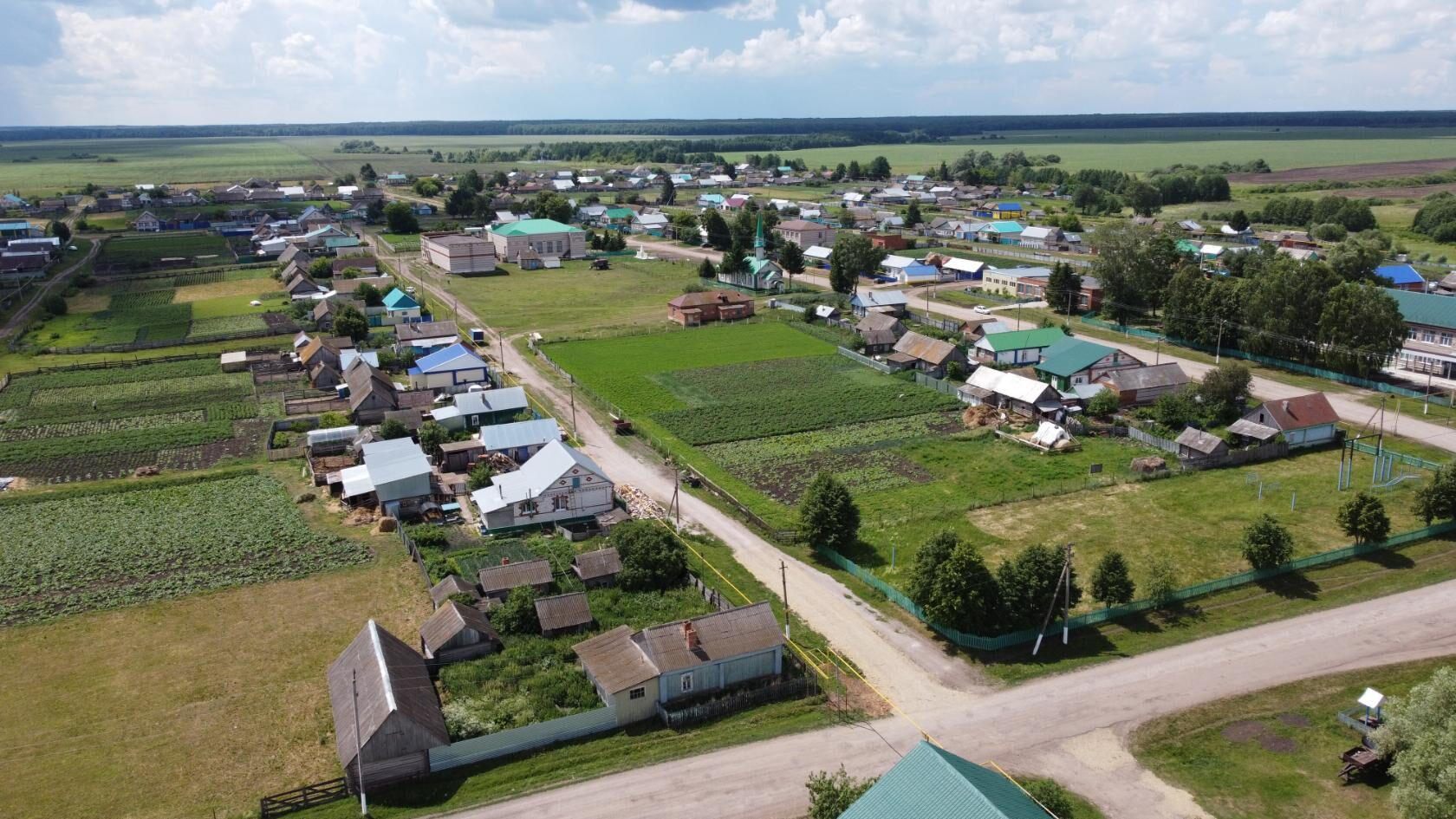
- Interactive map of Kichkalnya
- Location of Kichkalnya Kichkalnya (Tatarstan)
- Coordinates: 54°44′32.43″N 50°21′37.25″E
- Country: Russia
- Federal subject: Tatarstan
- Founded: 18th century

Population
  - Estimate (2020): 463 )

Municipal status
  - Municipal district: Nurlatsky Municipal District
- Time zone: UTC+3 (MSK)
- Postal code: 423038
- Dialing code: +7 884345
- OKTMO ID: 92646442101

External videos
- Timelapse from the satellite on YouTube

Kichkalnya (Tatar: Кычытканлы́, Qıçıtqanlı, قچتقانلی; Russian: Кичкальня́) is a Tatar village in the Nurlatsky district of the Republic of Tatarstan in Russia.

== Etymology ==
The name of the village Kichkalnya comes from the word Tatar: Кычытканлы, romanized: Qıçıtqanlı, which translates as 'nettle', due to the fact that a lot of nettles grew on the territory of the village. Previously, it was probably called Tatar: Кечкенә, romanized: Keçkenä, which in translation means 'small'. In pre-revolutionary sources it is also mentioned under the name 'Vershina rechki Marasa' (the top of the Marasa river).

== History ==
According to old residents, the village of Kichkalnya was formed at the beginning of the 18th century. From stories passed down from generation to generation, the village was founded by three families who came from the Chuvash village of Uzeevo (now Aksubayevsky District). Mullah Tohvatullah was among the first founders of the village. According to legend, these families fled from their homes, hiding from forced baptism after the conquest the Khanate of Kazan by Ivan the Terrible. In fact, the resettlement of several families from the village of Uzeevo is explained by intraregional resettlement, since Ivan the Terrible died back in 1584.

The existing historiographic literature provides contradictory information about the date of the village formation - from the mid-1650s to 1710. According to the legend, a certain name in 1911 claimed that the village "Morasa Bashy" was founded 300 years ago, that is, in 1611, but this is highly unlikely. Until 1920, it was part of the Staro-Almetevskaya Volost of the Chistopol Uyezd of the Kazan Governorate.

At 18th - 1st half of 19th centuries residents belonged to the category of state peasants, performed lashman duty. They were engaged in agriculture, cattle breeding, brick, matting, cooperage, carpentry and wheel crafts.

Since 1920, it has been a part of the Chistopol Canton of the Tatar Autonomous Soviet Socialist Republic. From 10.08.1930 in Bilyarsky, from 10.02.1935 in Telmansky, from 16.07.1958 in Bilyarsky, from 01.02.1963 in Oktyabrsky, from 10.12.1997 in Nurlatsky Districts.

The status and boundaries of a rural settlement are established by the Law Republic of Tatarstan dated January 31, 2005 No. 32-ZRT "On establishing the boundaries of territories and the status of the municipal formation" Nurlatsky Municipal District "and municipalities within it"

== Population ==
Year	Population
1716	169 (81 men and 88 women)
1762	114 men
1816	325 (160 men and 165 women)
1859	~~635~~ 642 (323 men and 319 women)
1897	~~1,431~~ 1,395 (669 men and 735 women)
1908	1,470
1920	1,616
1926	1,122
1938	1,093
1949	1,028
1958	1,150
1970	1,159
1979	943=
1989	668=
2002	699=
2012	595=
2013	581=
2014	553=
2015	541=
2016	525=
2017	513=
2018	492=
2019	472=
2020	463=

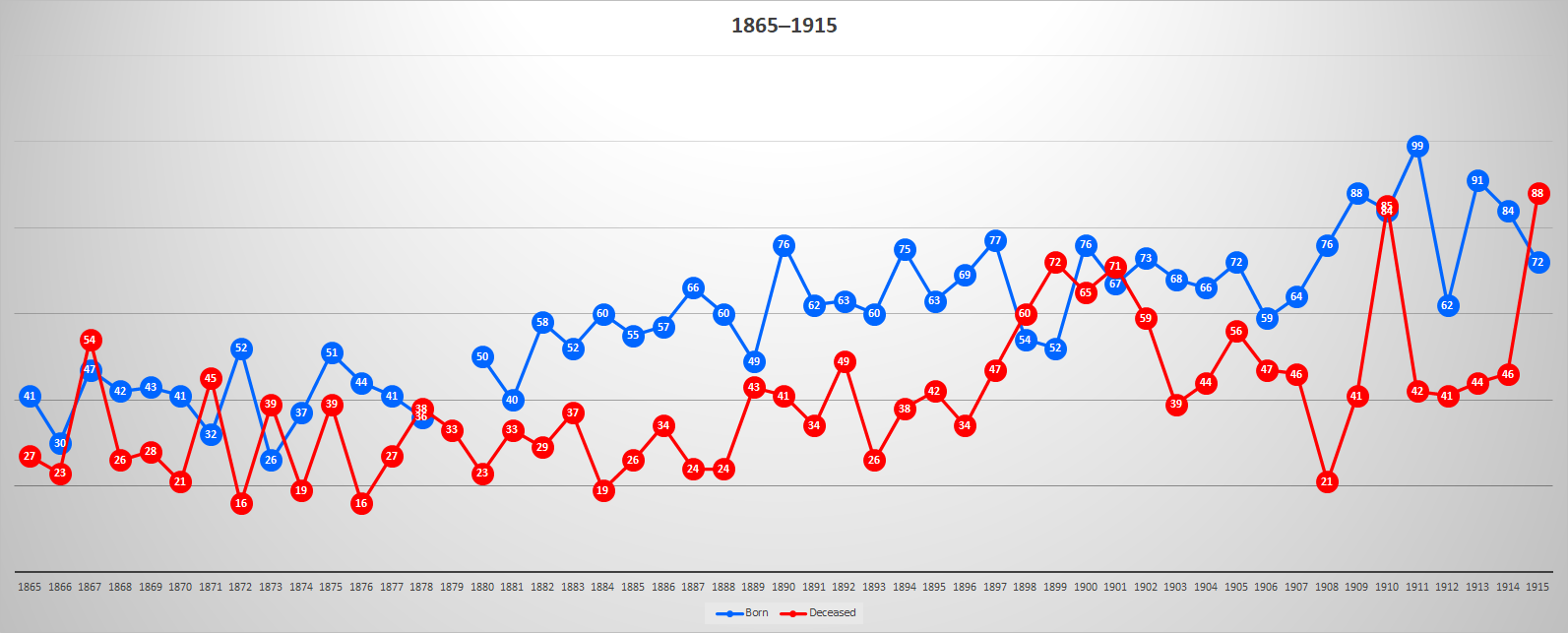

== Geography ==
Kichkalnya is located on the Marasa River, northwest of 60 kilometers of the district center of the city of Nurlat, the height of the village center above sea level is 120 m.

== Village plans ==
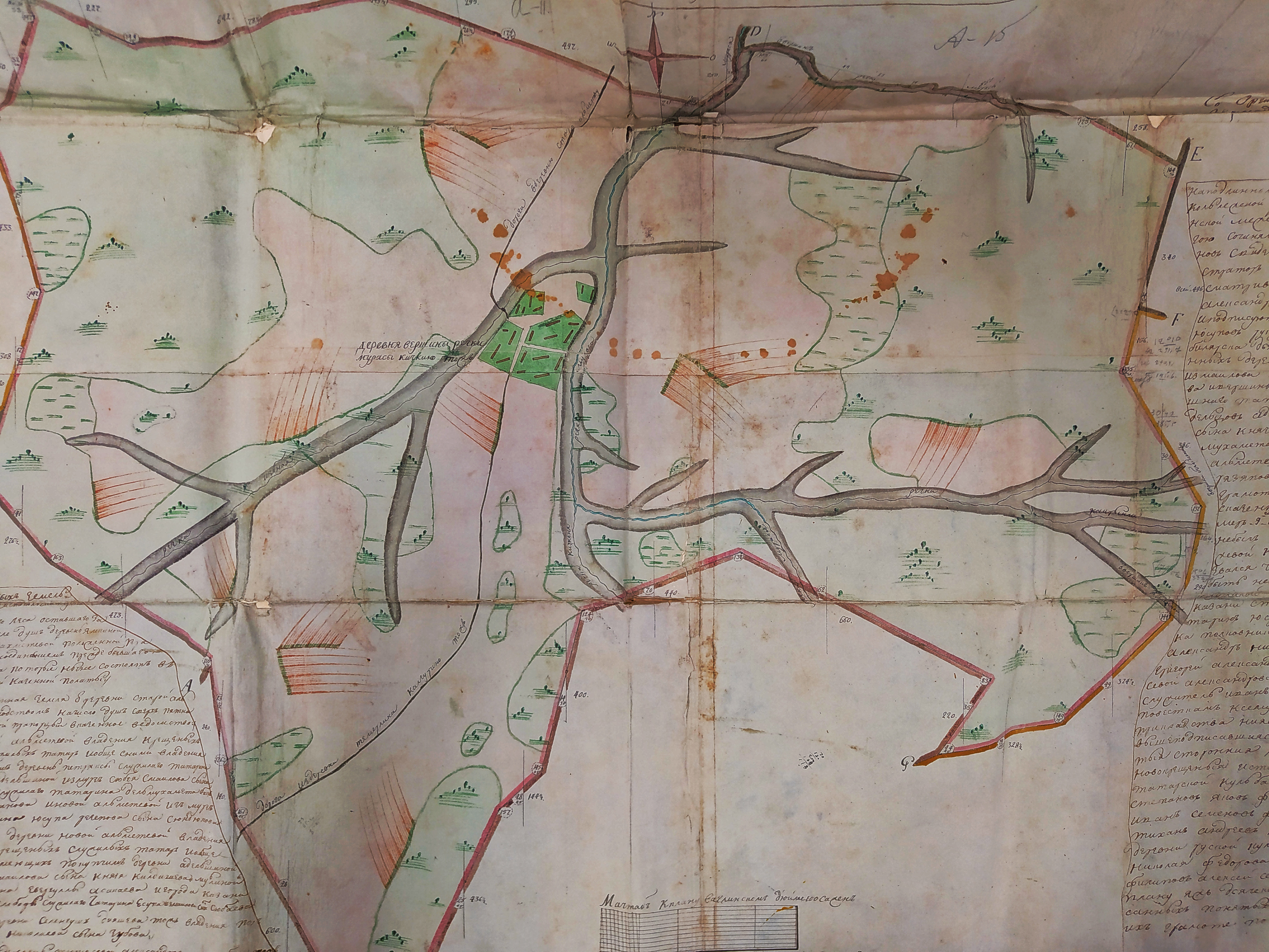
1794

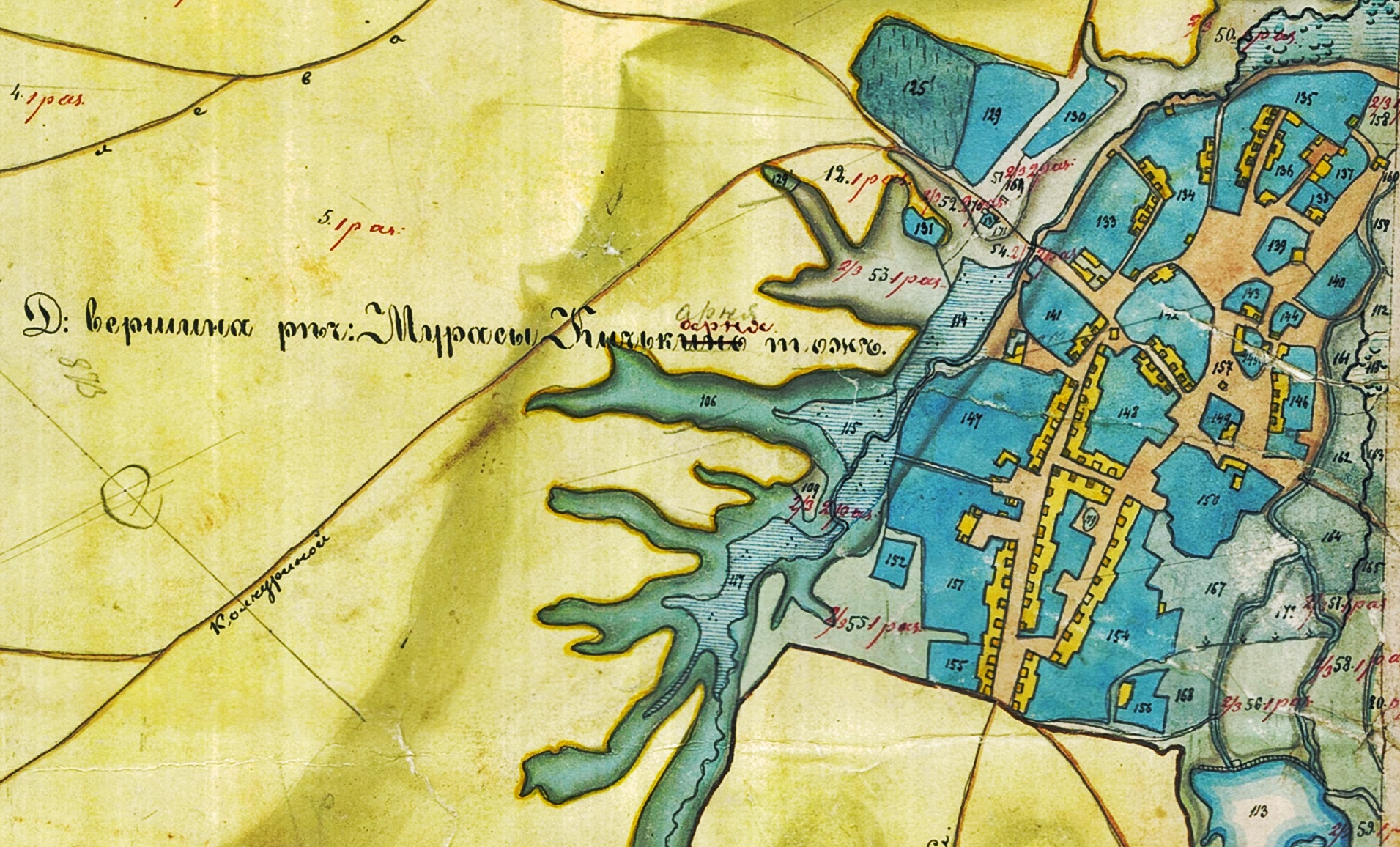
1854

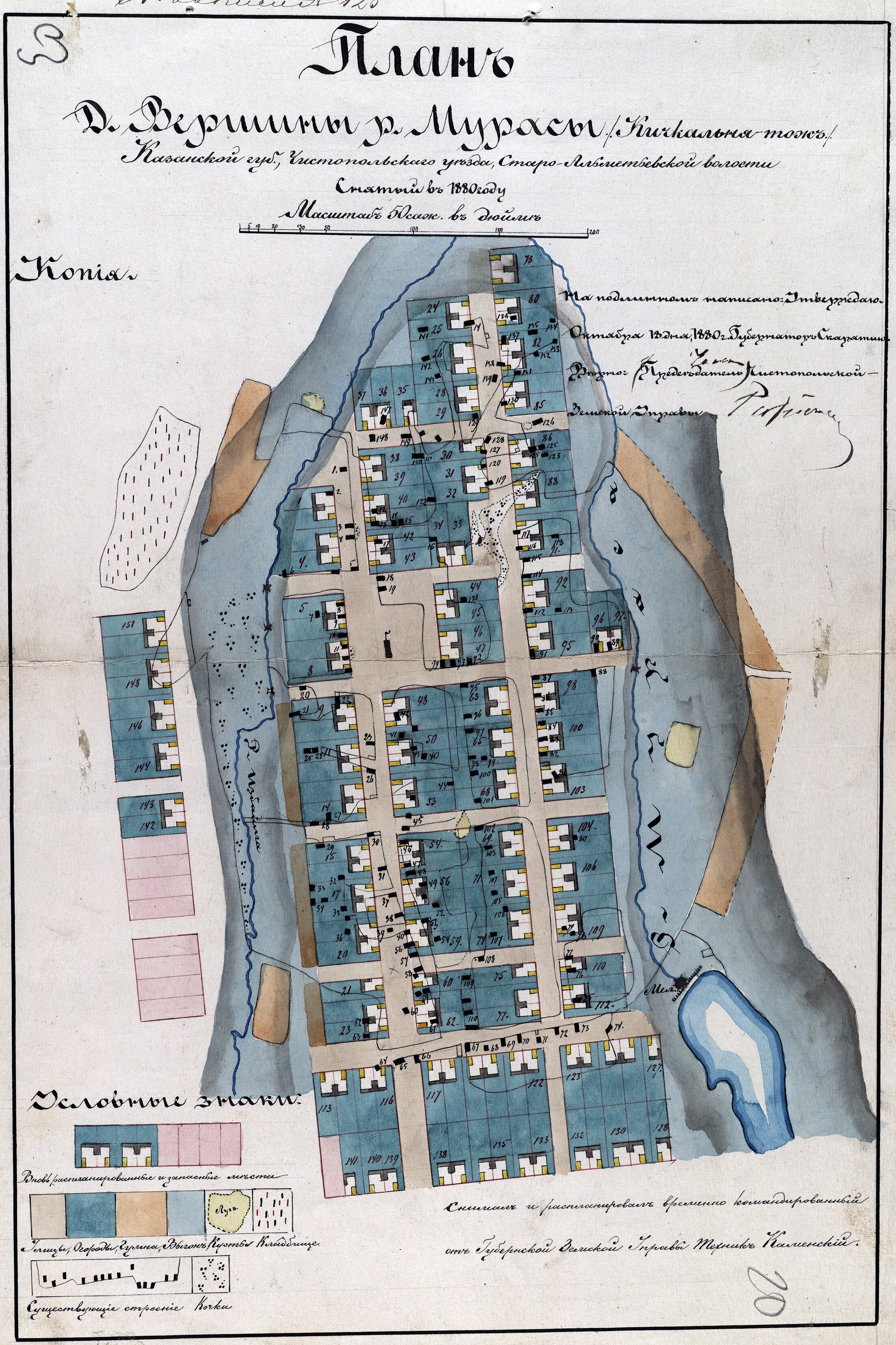
1880

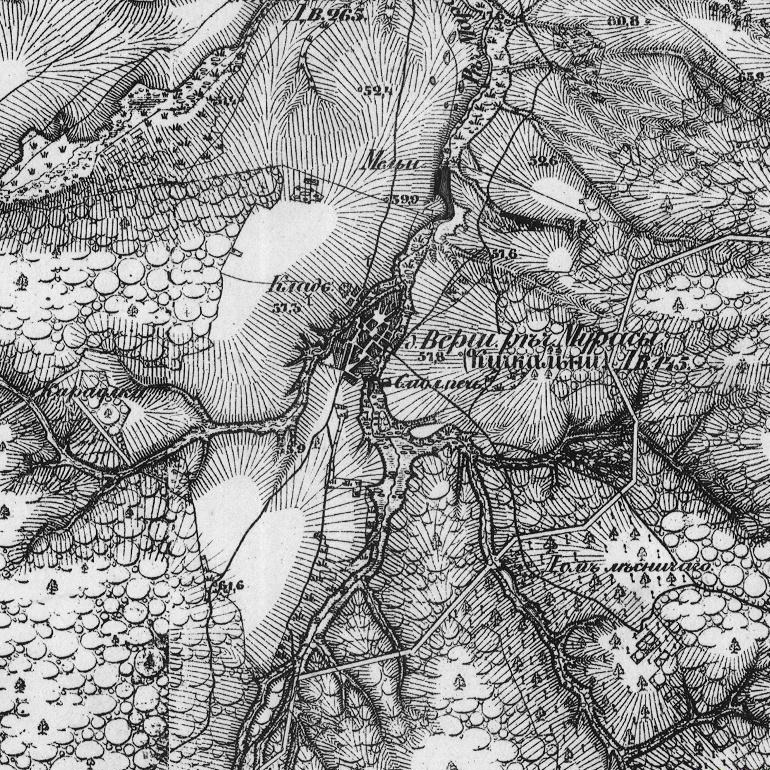
Fragment from the Military Topographic Map of the Kazan Governorate of 1880

=== Climate ===
Climate data for Kichkalnya
Month	Jan	Feb	Mar	Apr	May	Jun	Jul	Aug	Sep	Oct	Nov	Dec	Year
Mean daily maximum °C	−8	−7.1	−0.7	9.5	17.9	21.9	24.6	22.9	16.2	7.8	−0.1	−5.7	8.3
Daily mean °C	−10.4	−9.8	−3.8	5.1	13.5	17.9	20.6	18.9	12.7	5.2	−2	−7.9	5.0
Mean daily minimum °C	−13.2	−12.9	−7.4	0.1	8	12.8	15.6	14.4	8.9	2.5	−4	−10.3	1.2
Average precipitation mm	48	39	42	40	51	64	67	62	63	60	52	50	638
Mean daily maximum °F	18	19.2	30.7	49.1	64.2	71.4	76.3	73.2	61.2	46.0	31.8	21.7	46.9
Daily mean °F	13.3	14.4	25.2	41.2	56.3	64.2	69.1	66.0	54.9	41.4	28	17.8	41.0
Mean daily minimum °F	8.2	8.8	18.7	32.2	46	55.0	60.1	57.9	48.0	36.5	25	13.5	34.2
Average precipitation inches	1.9	1.5	1.7	1.6	2.0	2.5	2.6	2.4	2.5	2.4	2.0	2.0	25.1
Average rainy days	9	7	7	6	7	8	8	8	8	8	8	9	93
Average relative humidity (%)	84	82	82	69	60	62	62	64	71	74	74	81	72
Percentage possible sunshine	1.7	3.2	5.7	9.5	12.1	12.8	12.6	10.6	7.2	4.3	2.3	1.5	7.0
Source: Kichkalnya climate

The climate is temperate continental. Climate code according to Köppen-Geiger climate classification: Dfb. The average annual air temperature is 4.66 °C (40.39 °F).

== Infrastructure ==
At the beginning of the 20th century, two mosques, two madrasahs, a smithy, and ten small shops functioned.

At this point in the village of ten streets, there is a secondary school, a house of culture, a library, a mosque, kindergarten, feldsher-obstetric station, 2 shops, post office

A memorial complex to the participants of the Great Patriotic War was opened in Kichkalnya.

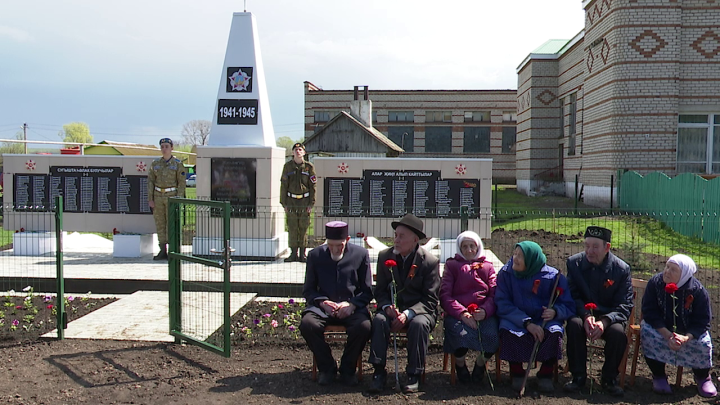
Memorial complex to the participants of the Great Patriotic War in Kichkalnya

External videos
- A memorial complex to the participants of the Great Patriotic War was opened in Kichkalna on YouTube

== Gallery ==
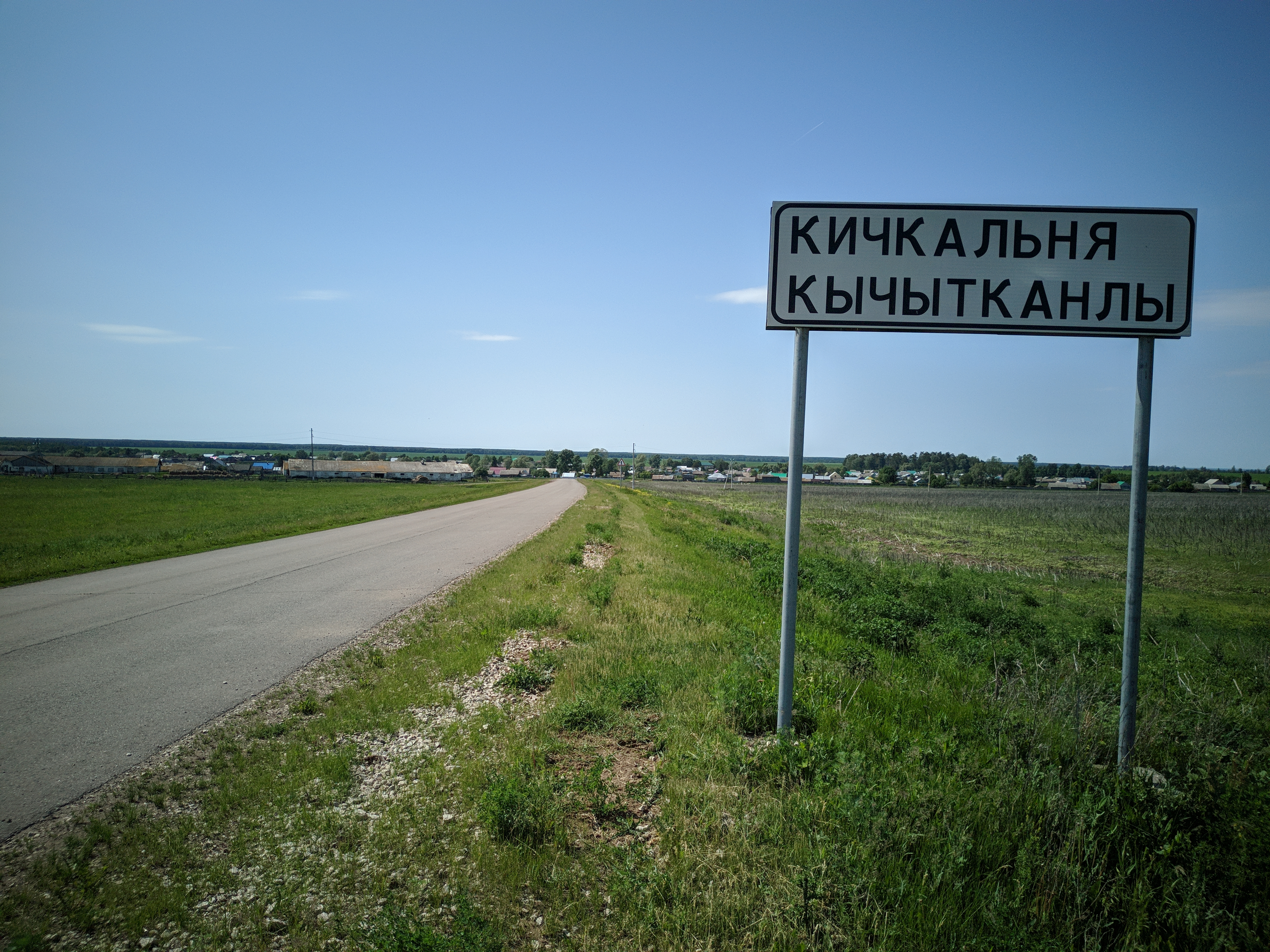
Inscription at the entrance to the village of Kichkalnya

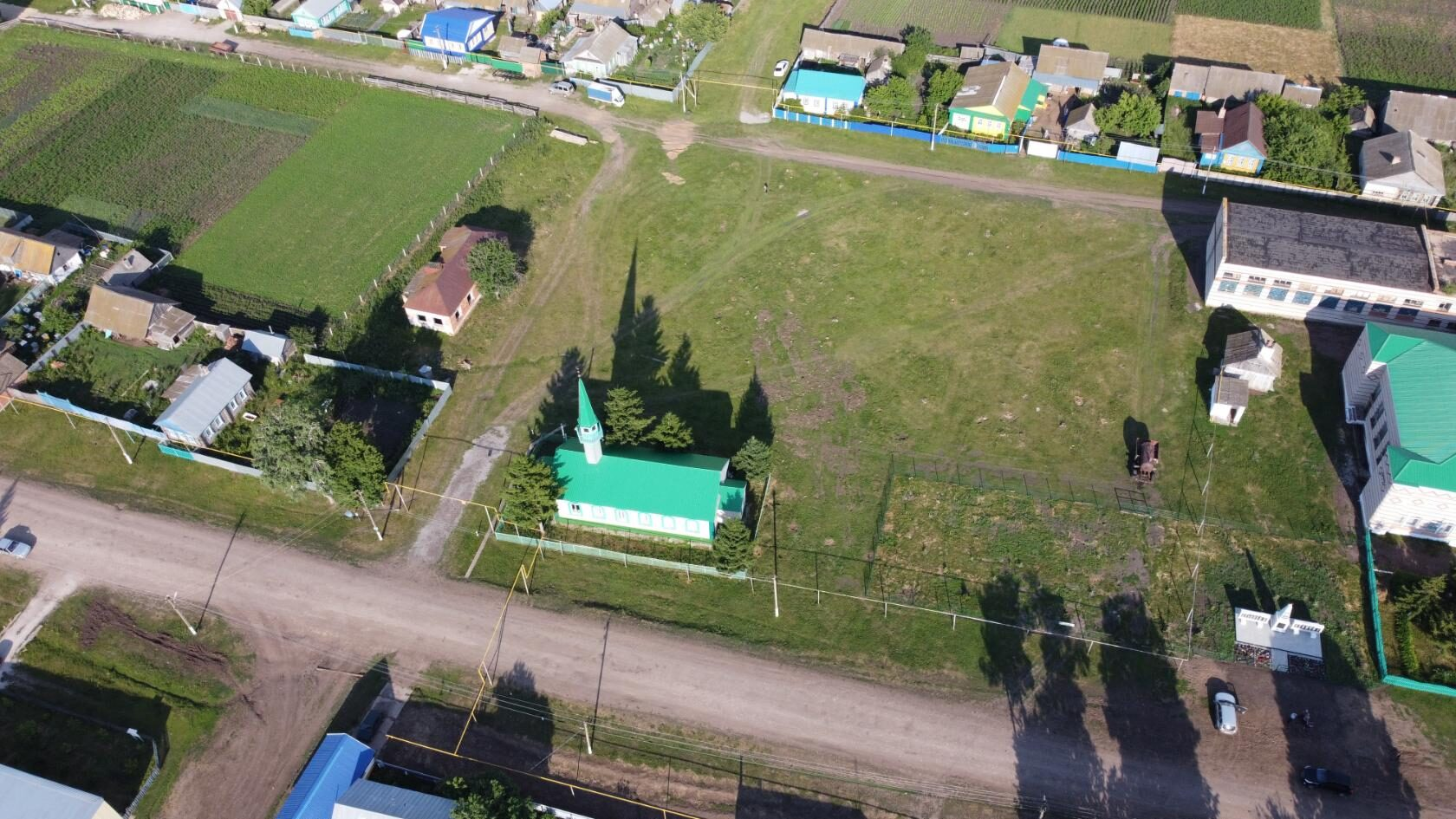
Rural mosque

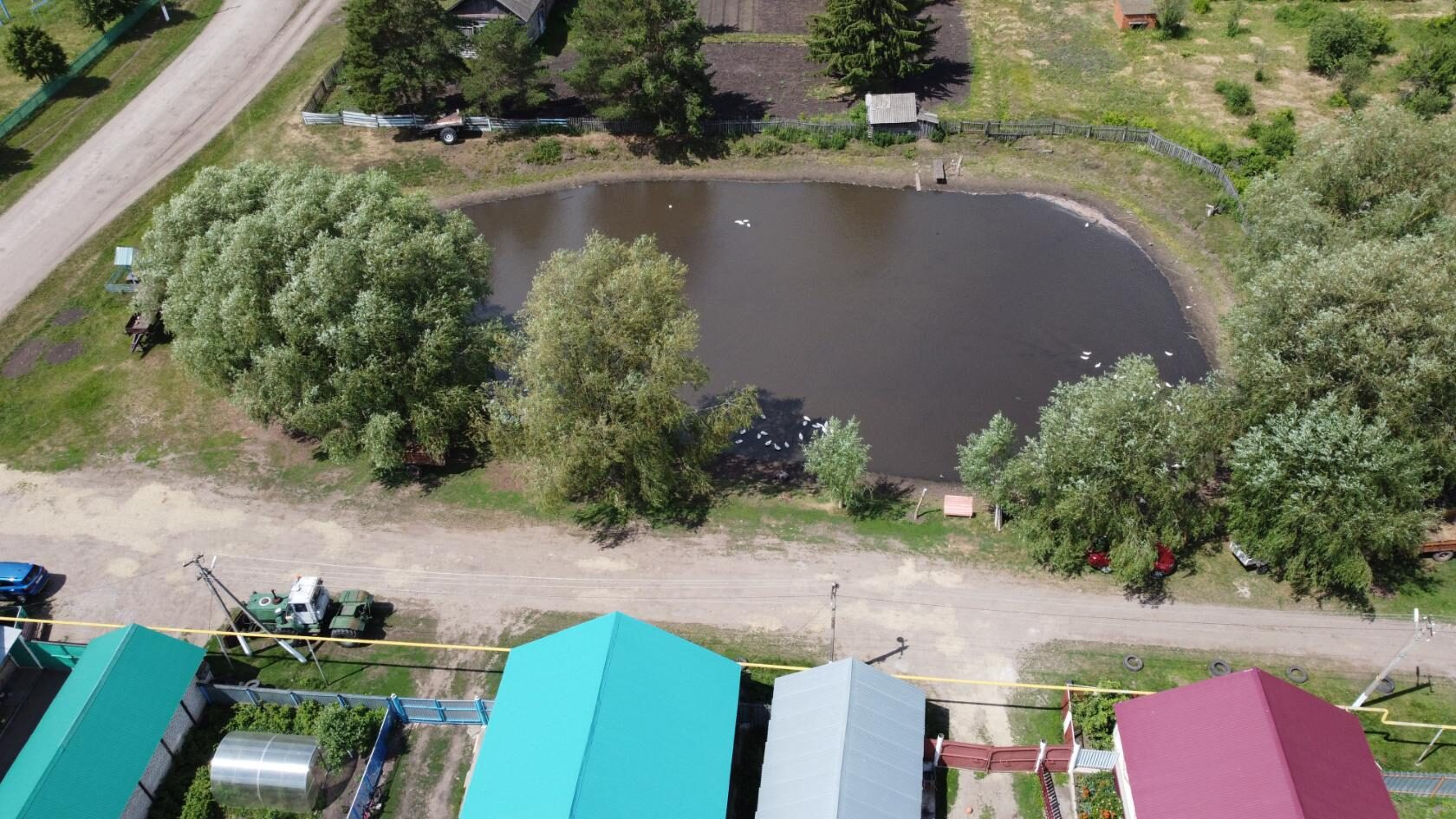
School lake

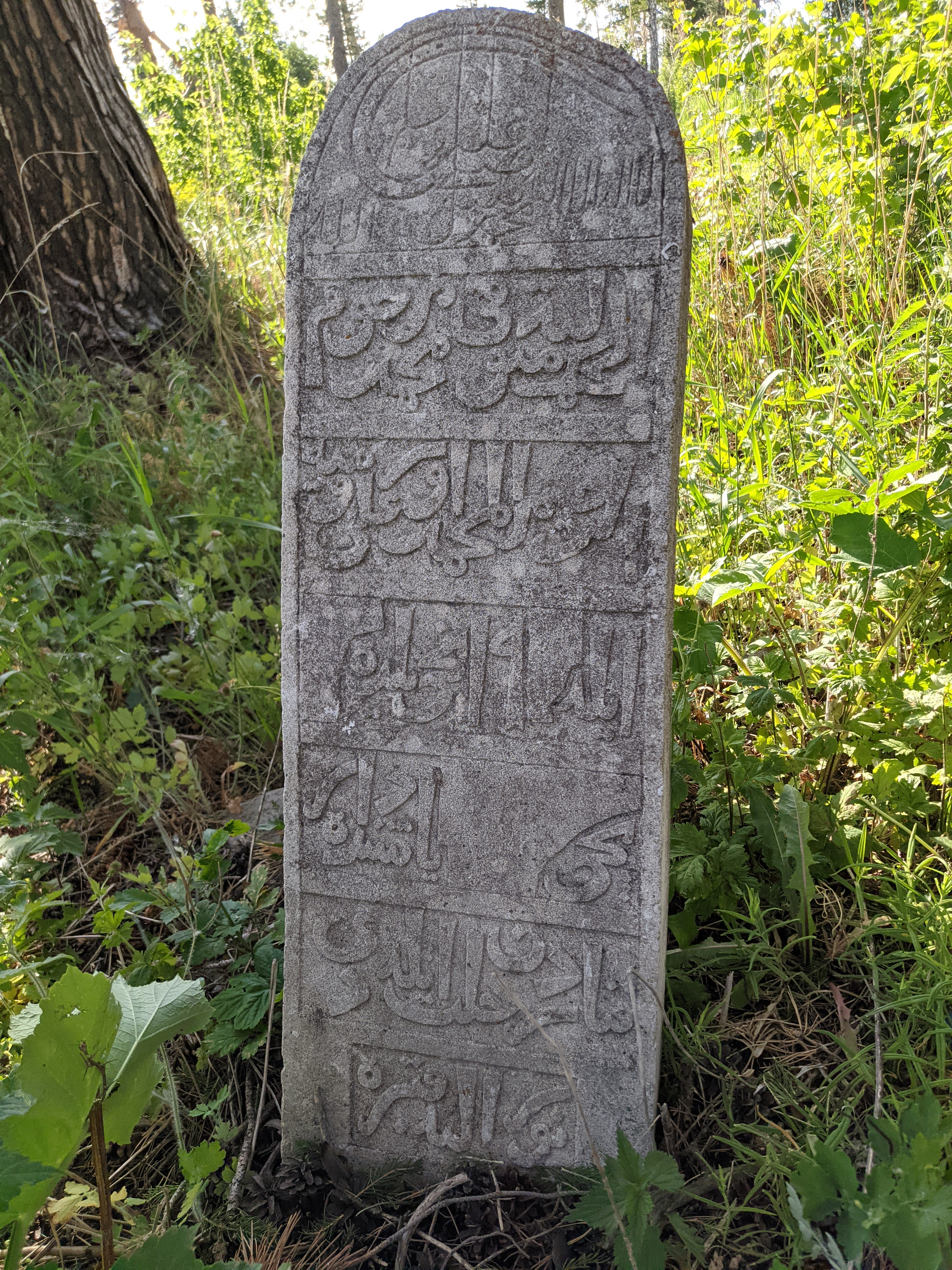
Tombstone placed to Mukhamedrahim son of Almukhamet in 1909

== Literature ==
Tatarskaya entsiklopediya: in 6 vol. / Ch. ed. M.Kh. Khasanov, res. ed. G. S. Sabirzyanov. – Kazan: Institut Tatarskoy entsiklopedii AN RT, 2006. – T. 3: K–L. – 664 p. (Татарская энциклопедия: В 6 т. / Гл. ред. М.Х. Хасанов, отв. ред. Г. С. Сабирзянов. – Казань: Институт Татарской энциклопедии АН РТ, 2006. – Т. 3: К–Л. – 664 с.)

== Famous personalities ==
- Zigangir Razyapov, revolutionary
- Fales Valeev
- Talgat Galiullin

== Links ==
- "Kichkalny rural settlement" (in Russian). Office of the President of the Republic of Tatarstan.
- "Kichkalnya - 320 years" (in Russian). Office of the President of the Republic of Tatarstan.
- "Public cadastral map Kichkalnya village" (in Russian). Public cadastral map of Russia online.
- "The village of Kichkalnya" (in Russian). Administrative division of the Republic of Tatarstan.
- "Population of the Russian Federation by municipalities". Federal State Statistics Service (in Russian).
