= Marasa =

Morasa, Marasa
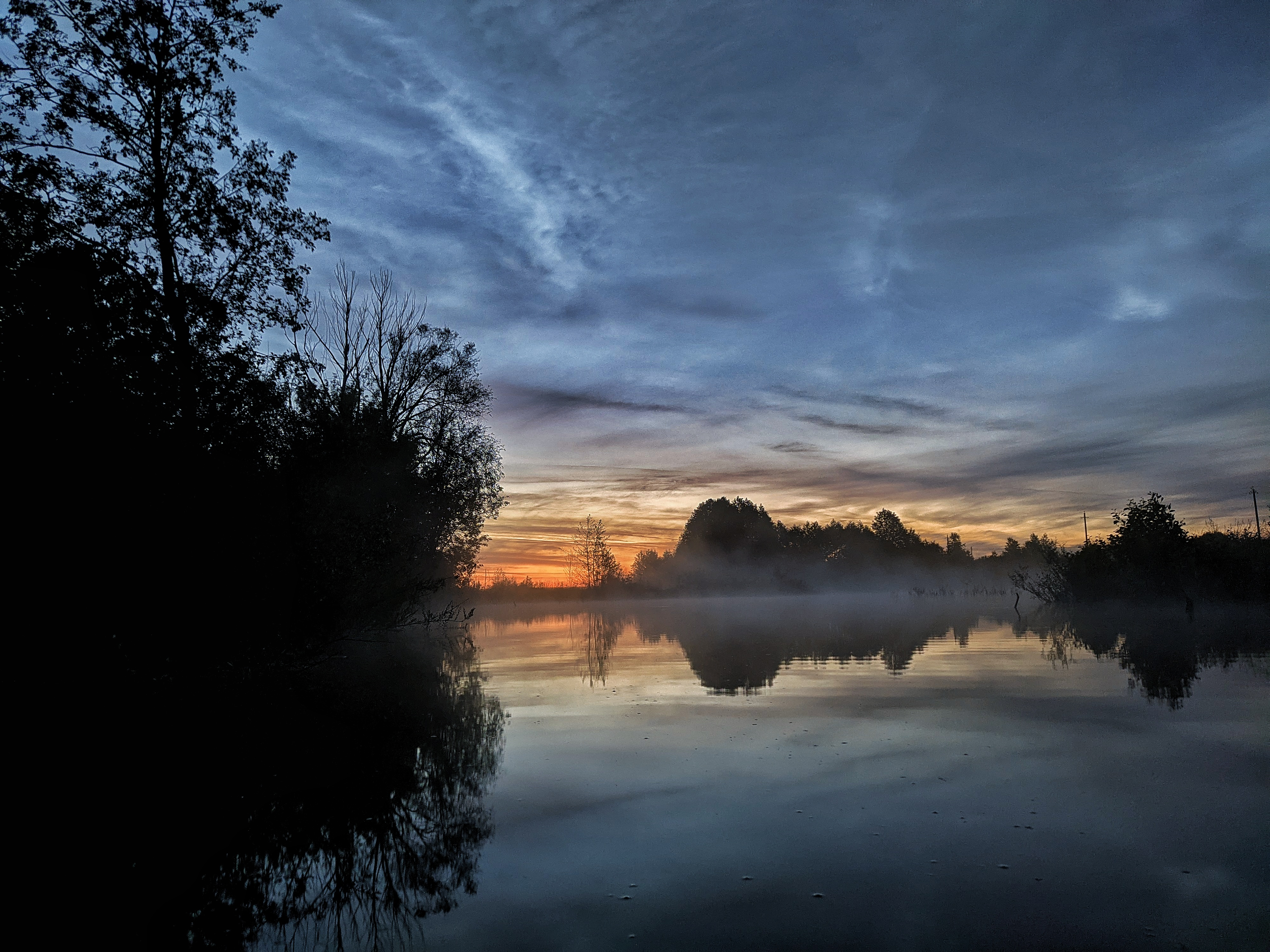

Location
- Country: Tatarstan, Russia

Physical characteristics
- Source
  - location: Kichkalnya, Nurlatsky District, Tatarstan
- Mouth: Maly Cheremshan
  - location: Alexeyevsky District, Tatarstan
  - coordinates: 54°53.766′N 50°12.018′E
- Length: 40 km (25 mi)
- Basin size: 385 km^{2} (149 sq mi)

Basin features
- Progression: Maly Cheremshan→ Bolshoy Cheremshan→ Volga→ Caspian Sea

The Marasa (Russian: Мараса; Tatar: Мораса, romanized: Morasa) is a river in Russia that flows through the territory of the Alekseevsky and Nurlatsky District of Tatarstan.

== Geography and Hydrology ==
Marasa is a left-bank tributary of the river Maly Cheremshan, its mouth is located 95 kilometers from the mouth of the Maly Cheremshan. The length of the river is 40 km. The catchment area is 385 km^{2}.

It has a right tributary Garei.

== Water register data ==
According to the data of the state water register of Russia, it belongs to the Lower Volga Basin District, the water management section of the river is Bolshoy Cheremshan from its source to its mouth. The river basin of the river is the Volga from the upper Kuybyshev reservoir to the confluence with the Caspian Sea.

Object code in the state water register - 11010000412112100005152.
