= Girey-kala =

Medieval Volga Bulgarian city in Nurlatsky District, Tatarstan, Russia

- Гирей-кала / Новоальметьевское городище (Russian)
- Novoalmetyevskoye gorodishche
- Location within Tatarstan Location within Russia
- 54°46′50″N 50°21′58″E
- Type: Hillfort
- Location: Nurlatsky District, Tatarstan, Russia
- Region: Volga region
- Part of: Tatarstan

History
- Built: Unknown (possibly medieval period)

Site notes
- Material: Earth
- Height: 0.8–0.9 m (ramparts)
- Area: 40,000 m^{2} (430,000 sq ft)
- Condition: Partially preserved

Girey-kala, also known as the Novoalmetyevskoye gorodishche (Гире́й-кала́, Новоальметьевское городище), is an ancient hillfort located in the village of Novoye Almetyevo, Nurlatsky District of the Republic of Tatarstan, Russia.

== Description ==
The settlement is situated in the northeastern part of Novoye Almetyevo, between the right bank of the Marasa River and its tributary Garey River. It has a quadrangular platform with a total area of about 40,000 m^{2} (430,000 sq ft). It is elongated from south to north. The southern side was defended by two rows of ramparts (0.8–0.9 m high, 25–30 m wide) and ditches. Part of the ramparts, which contain a central gap, as well as the site itself, are now occupied by houses and gardens.

A 19th-century archival case states that the settlement lay on the right bank of the Marasa River near the mouth of the Garey River. It had a circular form about 260 sazhen in circumference. By that time, the site was already partly built over with peasant houses, barns, and gardens. Ramparts and ditches survived only partially, as local residents extracted clay. The rampart was over 1 sazhen wide, while the ditch ranged from 1.5 to 2 sazhens.

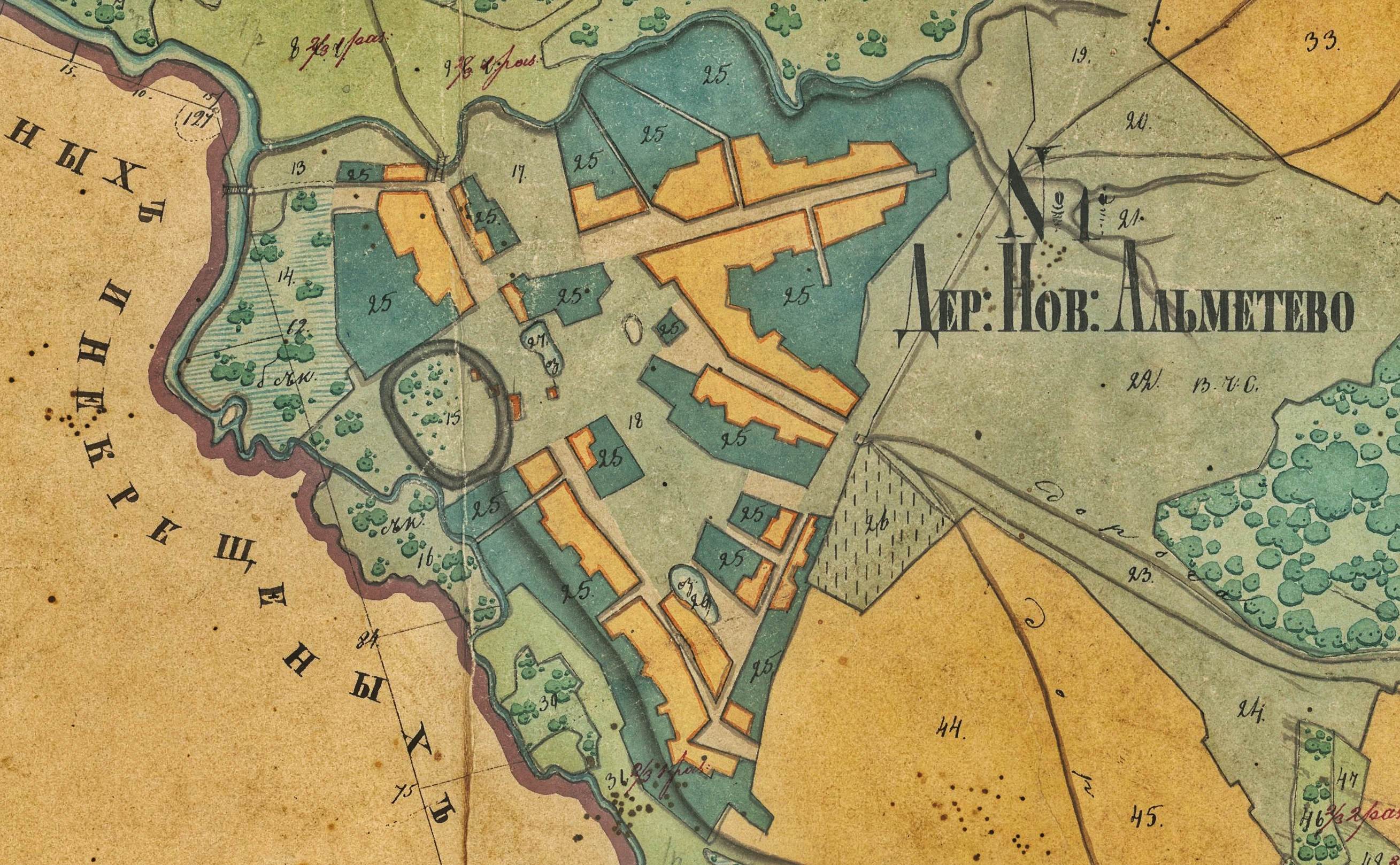
Plan of the village Novoye Almetyevo, 1850

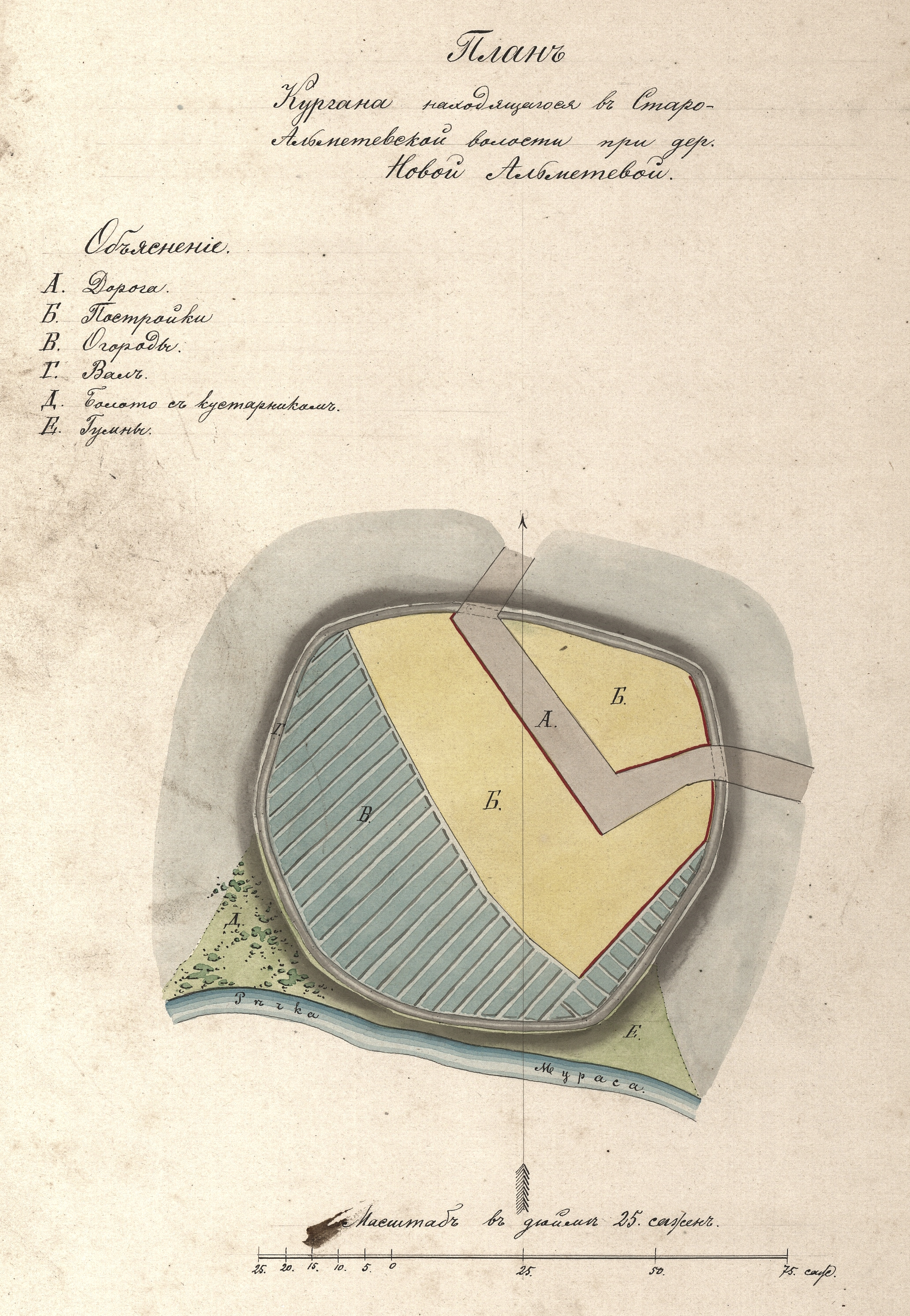
Plan of a burial mound near Novoye Almetyevo, Nurlat District, Tatarstan

== Historical references ==
The settlement is mentioned in several historical sources.

According to S. M. Shpilevsky, the Murasa (Marasa) River is a left tributary of the Maly Cheremshan River. On its right bank lies the village of Novaya Almetevo, near which the site is located. In the Lists of Populated Places of Kazan Governorate compiled by Artemyev, the settlement is also noted and referred to as Girey-kala.

In a report by Kondyrev (1812) to the Council of Kazan University, a description was given of a Tatar town located on a plain in the village of Almetevo. In documents from 1690, cited by Stepan Melnikov, mention is made of the allocation of unused land by the Marasa River to the leaders of the village of Tabor, which also records the presence of a settlement.

According to Shpilevsky, the name "Girey-kala" derives from the nearby Garey (Girey) River, as also confirmed by 1690 historical records.

== See also ==
- Giray dynasty
