= Girey =

Girey may refer to:

- Girey-kala, is an ancient hillfort located of the Republic of Tatarstan, Russia.
- Girey, Russia, an urban-type settlement in Krasnodar Krai
- Gəray, also spelled Girey, a village in Azerbaijan
- Girey Bairov (1922–1999), Crimean Tatar pediatric surgeon in the Soviet Union

== See also ==
- Giray, a list of people with the given name or surname
- Girei, a town and local government area of Nigeria
