= Garai =

- Garai (surname)
- House of Garai, an old nobility from the Kingdom of Hungary
- Garai, Iran, a village in Kerman Province, Iran
- Garai, Biscay, a municipality in Spain

== See also ==
- Garay (disambiguation)
