= Garay =

Garay may refer to:

- Garay (surname)
- Gəray, a municipality in Azerbaijan
- Garay Department, Santa Fe Province, Argentina
- Garay alphabet, a script used by a small minority to write the Wolof language of West Africa
- Garay (ship), a type of warship used by Moro pirates in the Philippines
- Leslie Andrew Garay (1924–2016), an American botanist, whose author abbreviation is Garay
- Terminal de Transportación Pública Carlos Garay, a bus terminal in Ponce, Puerto Rico
- Carlos J. Garay Villamil, a prominent coachman in Ponce, Puerto Rico

== See also ==
- Garai (disambiguation)
