= Chulpanovo =

Chulpanovo may refer to:

- Chulpanovo, Arsky District, Republic of Tatarstan, a village (selo) in Arsky District of the Republic of Tatarstan, Russia
- Chulpanovo, Nurlatsky District, Republic of Tatarstan, a village (selo) in Nurlatsky District of the Republic of Tatarstan, Russia
