= Staro-Almetevskaya Volost =

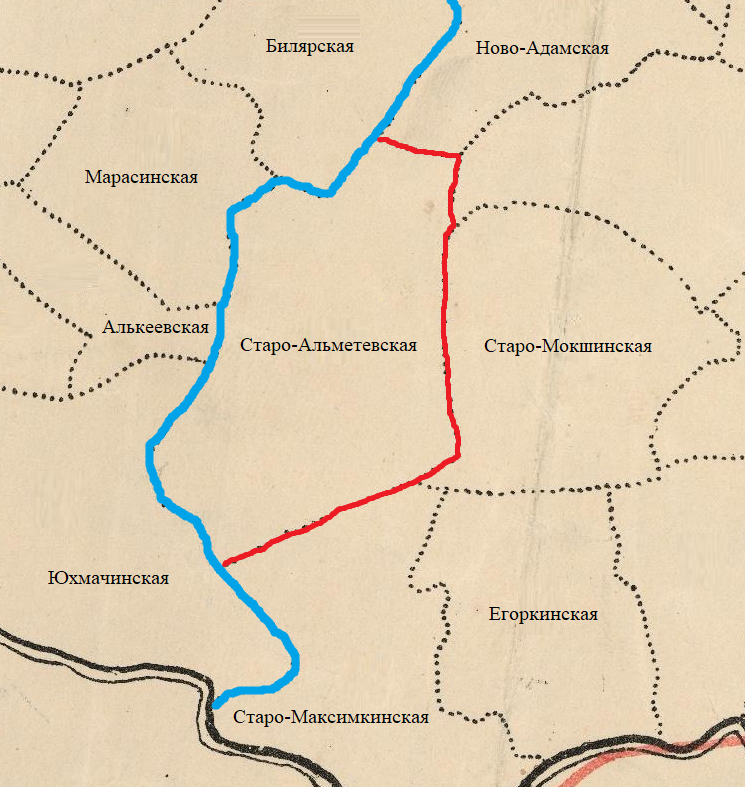
List of settlements of the Staro-Almetevkaya volost in 1908

Staro-Almetevskaya Volost (Tatar: ئىسكىٰ ئەلمەت ۋولىٰسىٰ, Iske Əlmət vulьsь, Иске Әлмәт вулысы; Russian: Старо-Альметевская волость) was an administrative division (a volost) of Chistopol Uyezd of the Kazan Namestnichestvo until 1796, the Kazan Governorate from 1796 to 1920, then as part of the Chistopol Canton of the Tatar ASSR from 1920 to 1930.

The administrative center was Almetevo. In 1930, the volost was abolished and most of its territory was annexed to the Bilyarsky District. Now it is located in the Nurlatsky district.

== Volost composition ==
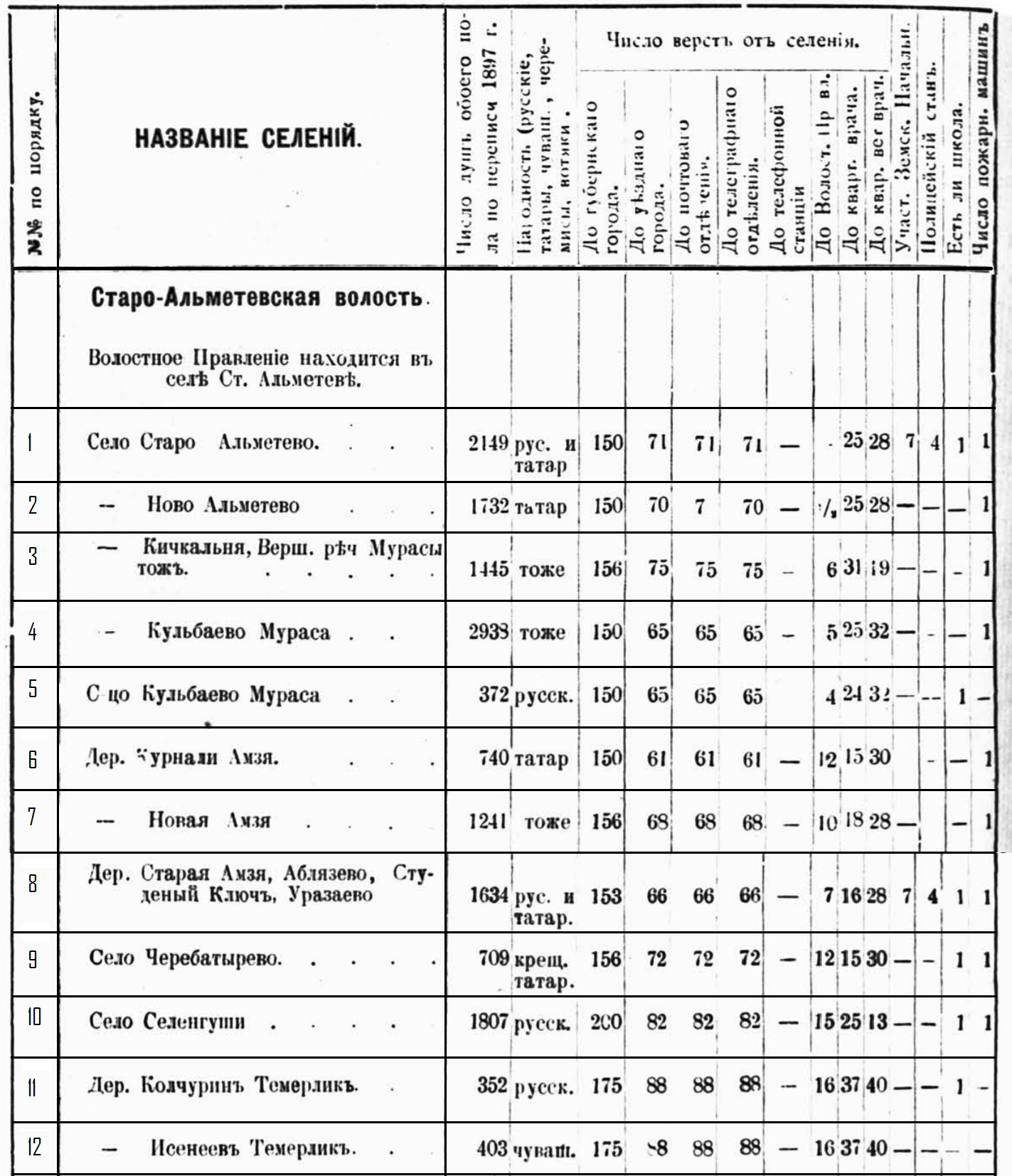
List of settlements of the Staro-Almetevkaya volost in 1908

== Literature ==
Татарский энциклопедический словарь (Tatar encyclopedic dictionary). Kazan: Institut Tatarskoy Entsiklopedii AN RT. 1999.
