= Valeev Fales Ahatovich =

Russian politician

Valeev Fales Ahatovich is a Russian politician who served as a People's Deputy of the Republic of Tatarstan, in Russia.

Ahatovich has been recognized as a Honored Worker of Agriculture of the Russian Federation and a Honored Worker of Agriculture of Tatarstan.

== Biography ==
Ahatovich was born on September 30, 1938, in Kichkalnya, in what was then the Soviet Union. He graduated from Kazan State University with a degree in philology.

Ahatovich is a mjember of the Commission on Environmental Safety, Land Reform, Natural Resources and Environmental Management. He was awarded the Orders of the Red Banner of Labor, Friendship of Peoples, and the medal "For Valiant Labor".
