= Nurlat =

Town in the Republic of Tatarstan, Russia

Nurlat Нурлат
- Town

Other transcription(s)
  - Tatar: Норлат
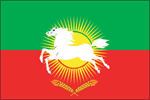
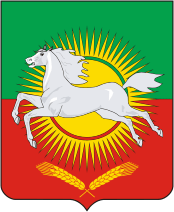
- Flag Coat of arms
- Interactive map of Nurlat
- Location of Nurlat Nurlat (Tatarstan)
- Coordinates: 54°26′N 50°48′E
- Country: Russia
- Federal subject: Tatarstan
- Founded: 1905
- Town status since: 1961
- Elevation: 150 m (490 ft)

Population (2010 Census)
  - Total: 32,601
  - Estimate (2021): 33,990 (+4.3%)

Administrative status
  - Subordinated to: town of republic significance of Nurlat
  - Capital of: town of republic significance of Nurlat, Nurlatsky District

Municipal status
  - Municipal district: Nurlatsky Municipal District
  - Urban settlement: Nurlat Urban Settlement
  - Capital of: Nurlatsky Municipal District, Nurlat Urban Settlement
- Time zone: UTC+3 (MSK)
- Postal code: 423040
- Dialing code: +7 884345
- OKTMO ID: 92646101001

Nurlat (Russian: Нурла́т; Tatar: Норлат) is a town in the Republic of Tatarstan, Russia, located on the Kondurcha River, 268 kilometers (167 mi) southeast of Kazan. Population: 32,601 (2010 census); 32,527 (2002 census); 23,507 (1989 Soviet census).

== History ==
Nurlat was formerly known as Nurlat-Oktyabrsky.

It was founded in 1905 as a settlement around a railway station. Town status was granted to it in 1961.

== Administrative and municipal status ==
Within the framework of administrative divisions, Nurlat serves as the administrative center of Nurlatsky District, even though it is not a part of it. As an administrative division, is incorporated separately as the town of republic significance of Nurlat—an administrative unit with the status equal to that of the districts. As a municipal division, the town of republic significance of Nurlat is incorporated within Nurlatsky Municipal District as Nurlat Urban Settlement.

== Transportation ==
There is an airport in Nurlat.

== See also ==
- Nurlatsky District
- Kichkalnya
