= Garai, Iran =

Garai گرائي
- Village
- Location within Iran
- Coordinates: 29°56′00″N 56°25′27″E
- Country: Iran
- Province: Kerman
- County: Bardsir
- Bakhsh: Central
- Rural District: Kuh Panj

Population (2006)
  - Total: 33
- Time zone: UTC+3:30 (IRST)
  - Summer (DST): UTC+4:30 (IRDT)

Garai (Persian: گرائي, also Romanized as Garā’ī; also known as Garrāhī, Garrā’ī Shomālī, and Garrū’ī Shomālī) is a village in Kuh Panj Rural District, in the Central District of Bardsir County, Kerman Province, Iran. At the 2006 census, its population was 33, in 8 families.
