= Gəray =

- Municipality
- Location within Azerbaijan
- Coordinates: 41°20′N 48°19′E
- Country: Azerbaijan
- Rayon: Quba

Population
  - Total: 128
- Time zone: UTC+4 (AZT)
  - Summer (DST): UTC+5 (AZT)

Gəray (also, Gərəy, Gerey, and Girey) is a village and municipality in the Quba Rayon of Azerbaijan. It has a population of 128.
