= Maly Cheremshan =

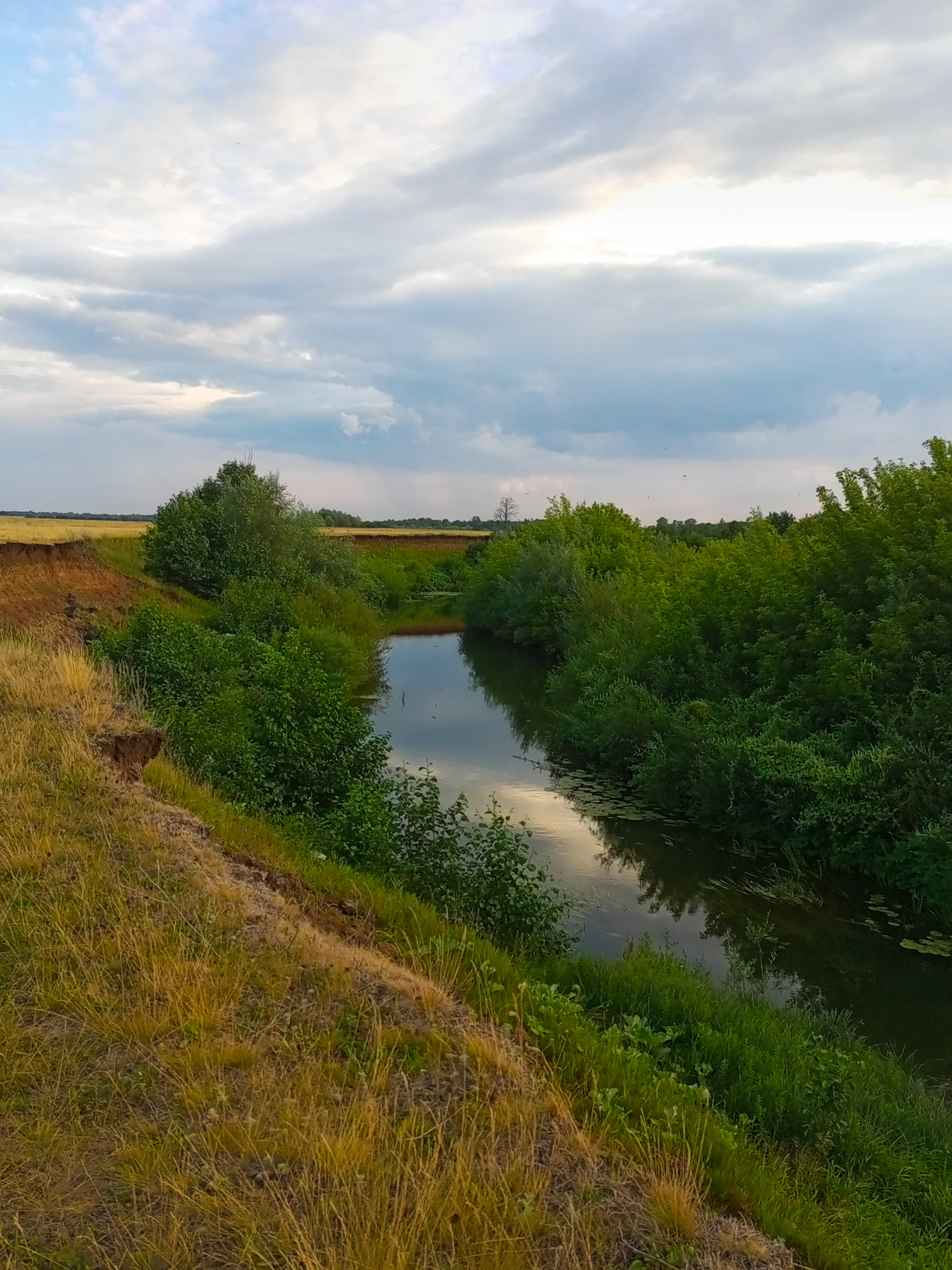

Location
- Country: Tatarstan and Ulyanovsk Oblast, Russia

Physical characteristics
- Source
  - location: Tatarsky Yeltan, Chistopolsky District, Tatarstan
- Mouth: Bolshoy Cheremshan
  - location: Ulyanovsk Oblast
  - coordinates: 54.3347°N 50.0221°E
- Length: 192 km (119 mi)
- Basin size: 3,190 km^{2} (1,230 sq mi)

Basin features
- Progression: Bolshoy Cheremshan→ Volga→ Caspian Sea

The Maly Cheremshan (literally, The Little Cheremshan, Russian: Малый Черемшан; Tatar: Кече Чирмешән) is a river in Tatarstan and Ulyanovsk Oblast, Russian Federation, a right-bank tributary of the Bolshoy Cheremshan. It is 192 kilometres (119 mi) long. The river's drainage basin covers 3,190 square kilometres (1,230 mi^{2}). It begins near Tatarsky Yeltan, Chistopolsky District, Tatarstan, and flows to the Bolshoy Cheremshan in Ulyanovsk Oblast. Maximal water discharge is 702 cubic metres per second (24,800 cu ft/s) (1979).

Major tributaries are the Cheboksarka, Savrushka, Bagana, Adamka, Vyalyulkina, Baranka, Marasa, Ata, Shiya, Yukhmachka rivers. The maximal mineralization 500–700 mg/L. The average sediment deposition at the river mouth per year is 80 millimetres (3.1 in). In its middle reaches the river crosses the biggest forest in Transkama Tatarstan. Since 1978 it is protected as a natural monument of Tatarstan.
