= Bolshoy Cheremshan =

Bolshoy Cheremshan River
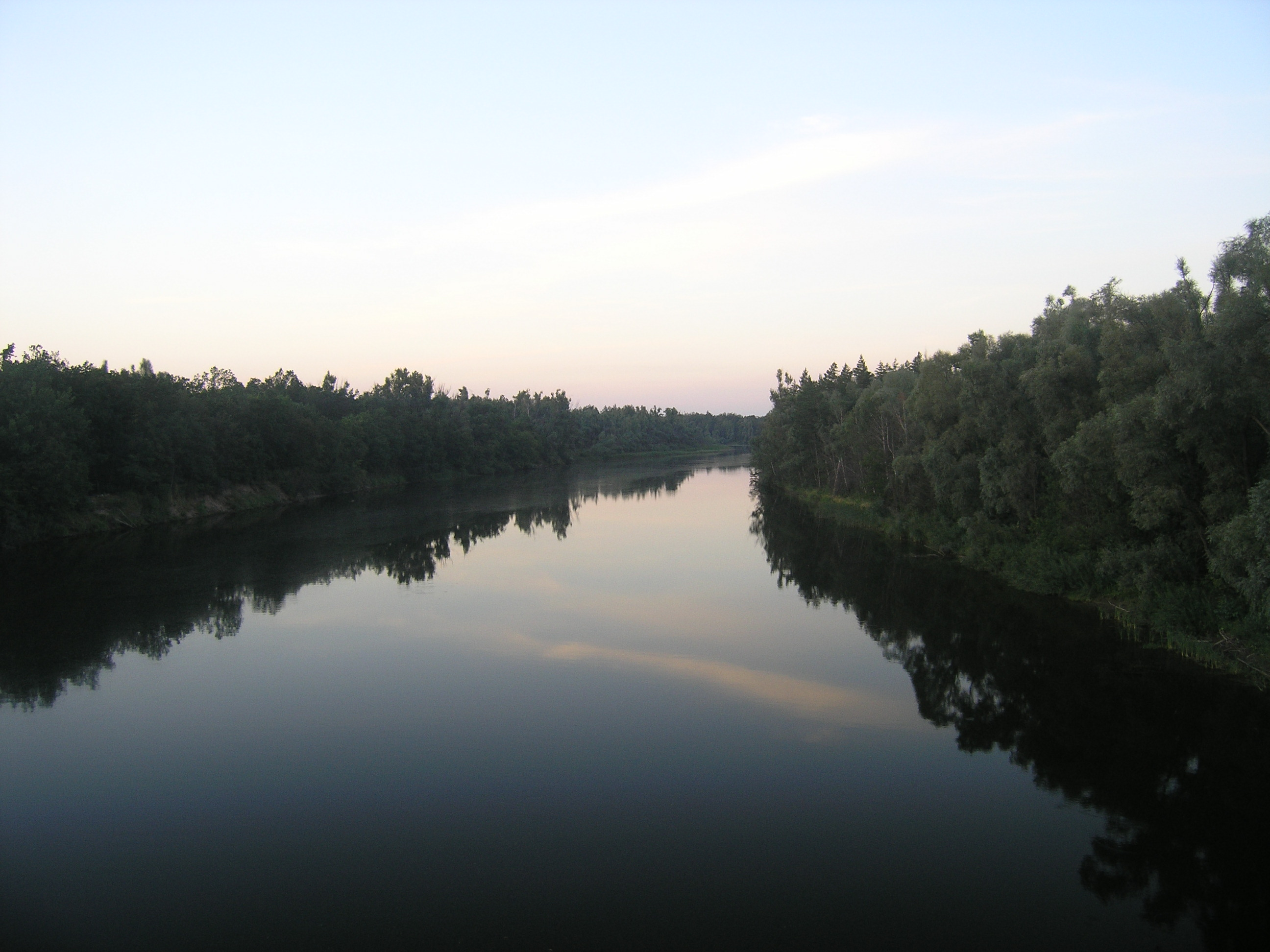

Location
- Country: Tatarstan and Ulyanovsk Oblast, Russia

Physical characteristics
- Source
  - location: Bugulma-Belebey Hills
- Mouth: Kuybyshev Reservoir, Volga
  - coordinates: 54°10′10″N 49°32′44″E
  - elevation: 53 m (174 ft)
- Length: 336 km (209 mi)
- Basin size: 11,500 km^{2} (4,400 sq mi)
- Discharge
  - average: 1,660 m^{3}/s (59,000 cu ft/s) (maximal)

Basin features
- Progression: Volga→ Caspian Sea

Bolshoy Cheremshan (Russian: Большой Черемшан, lit. 'Greater Cheremshan'; Tatar: Олы Чирмешән; Chuvash: Мăн Çарăмсан) is a river in Russia, a left tributary of the Volga between the Kama and Samara. It is 336 kilometres (209 mi) long, and has a drainage basin of 11,500 square kilometres (4,400 sq mi). It flows southwest to the Volga near Dimitrovgrad. The main inflows are the Bolshaya Sulcha and Maly Cheremshan. The maximal discharge is 1,660 cubic metres per second (59,000 cu ft/s) (1979), and the minimal mineralization is 600-800 mg/l. The riverbed is meandering and the meadows are wide. From around 1650 the Trans-Kama Line of forts ran along or near the Cheremshan.

== Etymology ==
The historical name Cheremisan is borrowed from the Tatar: Чирмешән, romanized: Çirmeşən, and comes from the ethnonym Cheremisy in the Kipchak version - Tatar: Чирмеш, romanized: Çirmeş, and it is respectively from the Chuvash (Bulgar) Şaramsan upper dialect and lower Şirmasen. Initially, this ethnonym Cheremis, Chirmysh, Şarmăsh meant not only the Mari, but also the Chuvash. Chuvash - Cheremis are called Şarmăsh, from the Oguro-Bulgar root şar, şur, şyr, şir - a ravine which in different toponyms was transferred to neighboring languages as sher, cher, char - for example; shirme, sherma, chirma, from the Chuvash şyrma, şarma, şurma: Ik Shurma, Urum-Shirma village, Kara-Shirma village, Tatarskaya Ikshurma village, Staraya Ik shurma village, Shurma. Thus, Chirme + shan means - ravine river, borrowed purely from the Chuvash (Bulgar) language as Şyrmasan from Şyrma - Chirme and the Chuvash affix of belonging in the plural san/-sen. The ethnonym Cheremis is associated with the fact that these peoples settled near the ravines "Şurma, Şyrma, Şarma" the etymology of which is from Şur - to tear, gap, cliff (of the earth) and the more ancient Chĕr (to scratch), according to myths, the ravines appeared as a result of the fact that Ulyp scratched the earth with a plow [1]. This same name is found in the well-known form of the hydronym - Dzharamsan, recorded by the Arab traveler Ibn Fadlan, 992, who, having visited the Volga Bulgaria, accurately conveyed the Bulgar (Chuvash) name Şaramsan, where the sound "Ş" was conveyed as "DZ" due to the absence in Arabic of a letter conveying the phonetics of "Ş". The Chuvash considered Khĕrlĕ Şyr (Red Ravine) to be one of the holy spirits in traditional ethnoreligion — a symbol of the "edge of the world" behind the horizon of which the sun hides. For this reason, the Chuvash chose places for settlements near ravines, following ritual and cult beliefs and traditions associated with ideas about the structure of the world based on the mythologies of their ancestors, because the keremet (yrsamai) had to be located near a ravine, and accordingly, a temple was first erected there, and a settlement nearby.
