= Nurlatsky District, Republic of Tatarstan =

Nurlatsky District Нурлатский район (Russian)
- District

Other transcription(s)
  - Tatar: Нурлат районы
  - Chuvash: Нурлат районӗ
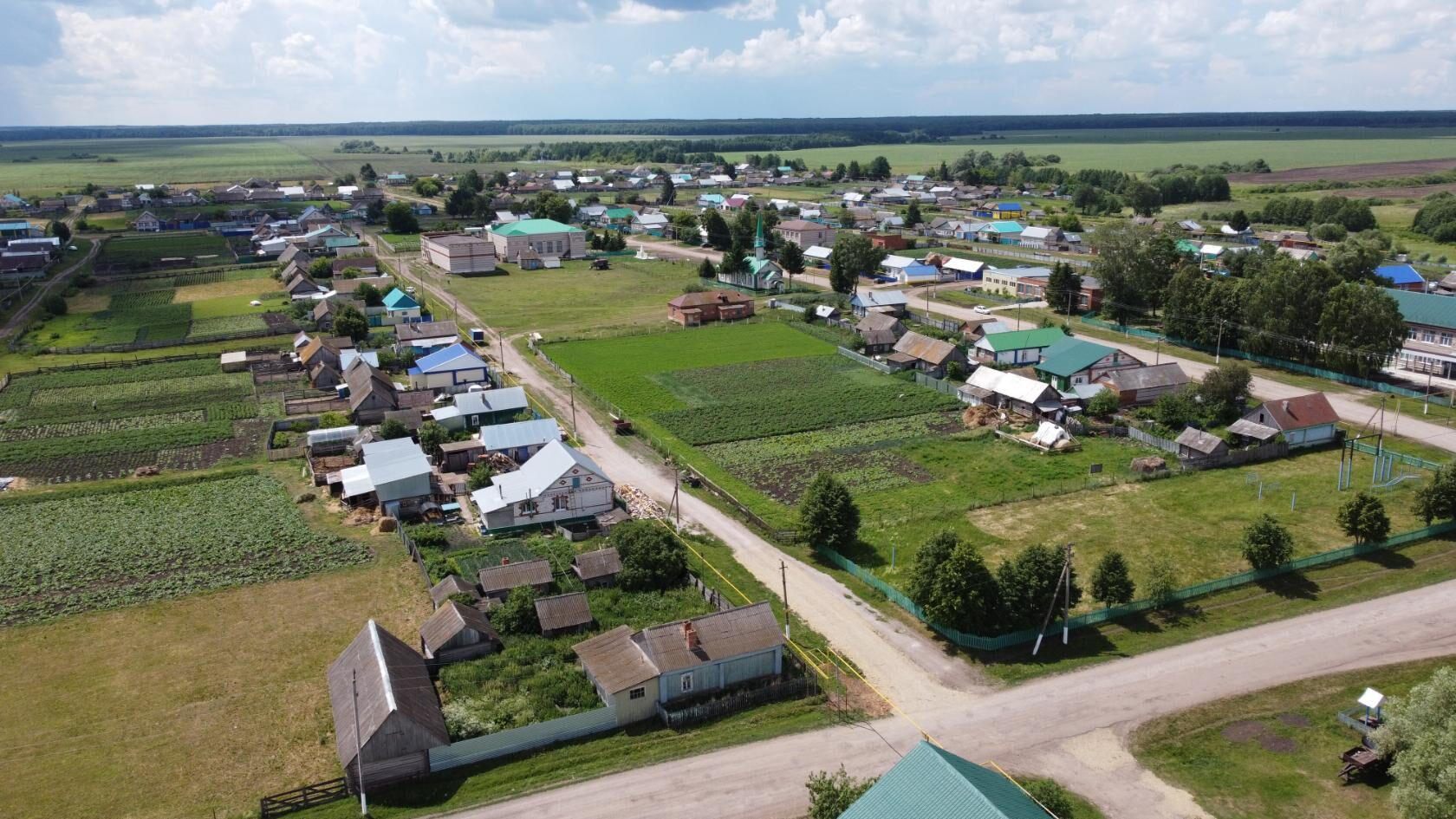
- Kichkalnya, Nurlatsky District

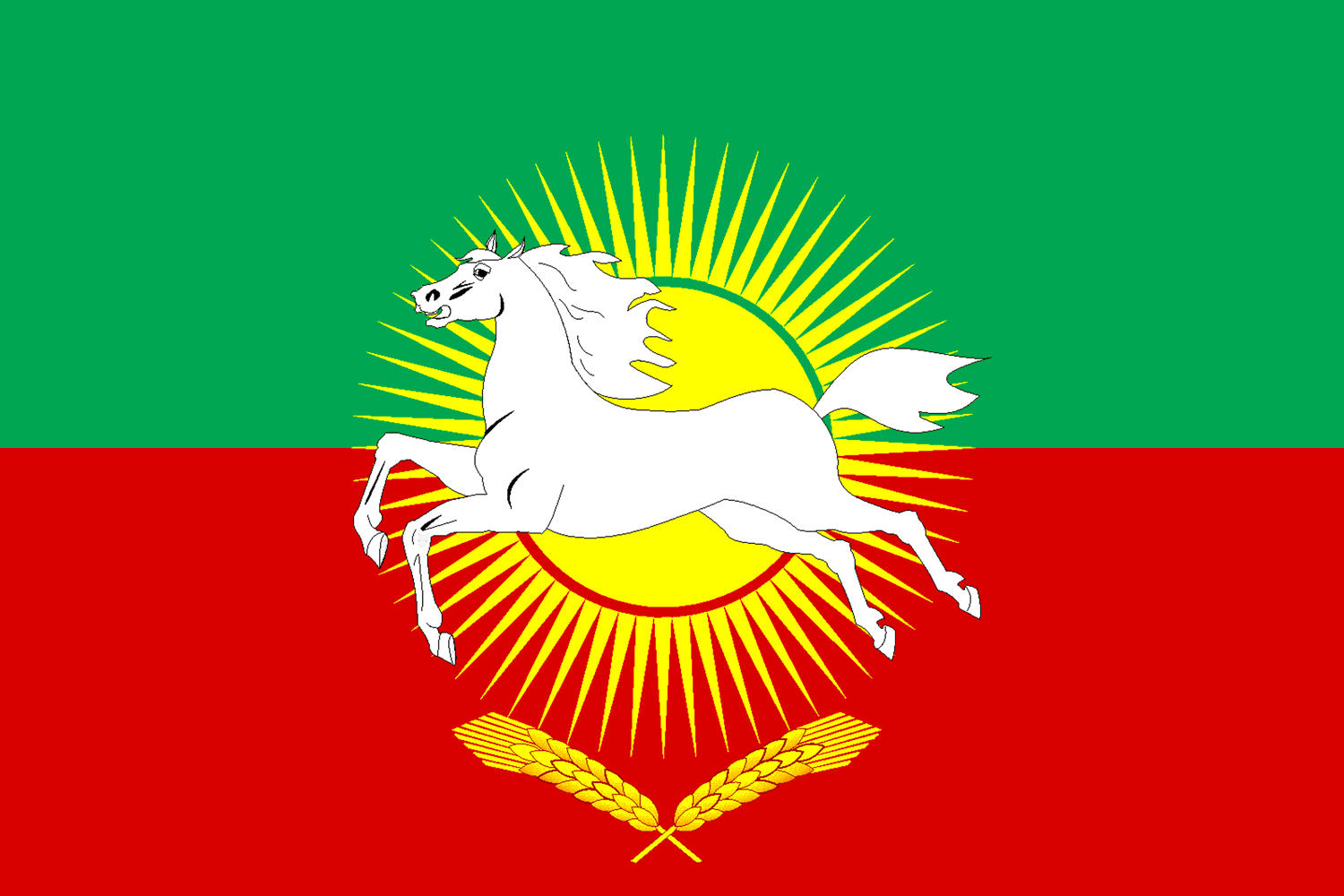
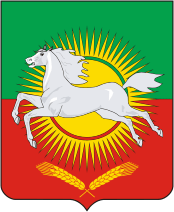
- Flag Coat of arms
- Location of Nurlatsky District in the Republic of Tatarstan
- Coordinates: 54°34′N 50°34′E
- Country: Russia
- Federal subject: Tatarstan
- Established: August 10, 1930
- Administrative center: Nurlat

Area
  - Total: 2,309 km^{2} (892 sq mi)

Population (2010 Census)
  - Total: 27,519
  - Density: 11.92/km^{2} (30.87/sq mi)
  - Urban: 0%
  - Rural: 100%

Administrative structure
  - Inhabited localities: 82 rural localities

Municipal structure
  - Municipally incorporated as: Nurlatsky Municipal District
  - Municipal divisions: 1 urban settlements, 26 rural settlements
- Time zone: UTC+3 (MSK)
- OKTMO ID: 92646000
- Website: http://nurlat.tatarstan.ru/

Nurlatsky District (Russian: Нурла́тский райо́н; Tatar: Нурлат районы) is a territorial administrative unit and municipality of the Republic of Tatarstan within the Russian Federation. The administrative center of the district is the city of Nurlat. In 2020, the population of the district was 58,290. Almost half of the district population lives in the district center (at least 33 thousand people).

The history of the district is closely connected with the Bulgar period in the Volga region and on the Kama. The city of Nurlat used to have different names: South Nurlat, Nurlat-Oktyabrsky. The Nurlatsky district was called Oktyabrsky from 1930 to 1937.

The main natural resource of the region is oil, which is very important for the district's economy. The main economic sectors are oil production, processing industry, and agriculture.

== Geography and climate ==
Nurlatsky district is a developed socio-economic municipal district with a total area of 2308.9 m^{2}. The district is located in the south of the Republic of Tatarstan, on the territory of the Western Trans-Kama and Samara Trans-Volga regions. The district shares borders with Alkeevsky, Alekseyevsky, Aksubayevsky, Cheremshansky districts of the Republic of Tatarstan, Samara (Koshkinsky and Chelno-Vershinsky districts), and Ulyanovsk regions (Novomalyklinsky district).

Forests cover 41.1% of the area of the Nurlatsky district. The area is a black earth zone and located in the southern part of the forest-steppe zone. There are deposits of oil, bentonite, and expanded clay.

The climate of the region is temperate continental, with rather mild winters (average temperature of January is −12 °C). Summer has got a stable temperature regime. The seasonal amount of precipitation in the form of rain and hail is 80 mm.

== Coat of arms and flag ==
The coat of arms was approved by the decision of the Council of the Nurlat Municipal District on July 15, 2006. There is the figure of a galloping horse and the shining sun as the background on the coat of arms. According to one of the versions, the name of the city of Nurlat is translated from the Tatar language as “shiny horse”. Equestrian sports and horse breeding are also priority areas of the district's socio-economic development. The ears in the red field represent the priority of agriculture. Gold is a symbol of harvest, wealth, stability, respect, intelligence. Red means labor, strength, courage, beauty. Silver is a symbol of purity, perfection, peace, and mutual understanding. Green is a symbol of nature, health, and growth in life. The flag is based on heraldic elements of the coat of arms.

== History ==
=== Etymology ===
The name of the district comes from the name of the municipal center Nurlat. The village of Nurlaty has been known since the 17th century. There are mentions of the villages of Verhny Nurlat (Abdulkino Nurlat) and Nizhny Nurlat (Nurlat) of the Samara district of the Simbirsk province in the 18th century. The name from the anthroponym Nur means "shiny", and Nurulla means “the light of Allah”.

=== Background ===
The history of the Nurlatsky district begins from the Bulgar times when the Bulgar settlements were founded on this territory, among which the Novoalmetyevskoe and Novoamzinskoe settlements were considered the largest. The defenders of Kazan went to these lands and founded a number of Tatar villages - Burmetyevo, Kurmanaevo, Upper and Lower Nurlat, Savinovo, Stepnoye Lake, Chulpanovo after the siege of the Kazan Khanate by Ivan the Terrible in 1552. There are also known pagan Chuvash settlements: Bilyar-Ozero, Elaur, Egorkino, Vishnevaya Polyana, Starye Chelny, and some others. It is known that in the 16th century, in the lower reaches of the Bolshoi Cheremshan River, separated groups of the Kazan Tatars settled.

The area has not been fully explored archaeologically. Data from 1964 to 1968 show the presence of two types of monuments here: burial mounds, located mainly on the watersheds, and Bulgar settlements, confined mainly to the Cheremshan river basin. The archaeological monuments of the Nurlatsky district are located in the settlements of Novoe Almetyevo, Novaya Amzya, Selengushi, Staraya Tatarskaya Amzya, Kulbaeva Marasa, Staroye Tatarskoe Almetyevo, Mikhailovka.

The Nurlatsky district was described in the diaries of the natural scientist and traveler in Russia Peter Pallas (1741-1811), which he visited as part of the academic expeditions of 1768-1774.

=== Civil War period ===
During the Russian Civil War, the Nurlat railway station was in the area of hostilities. The Czechoslovak corps, up to 60 thousand White Guards and the reactionary command, raised an anti-Soviet mutiny in 1918. The Belochekhs attacked Simbirsk (Ulyanovsk) and approached Nurlat in July 1918. In early August, Red Army units set fire to the wooden station building but they were forced to retreat. The White Guards sieged the Middle Volga region. Red Army soldiers were brought to the Nurlat station and shot on the territory of a coal warehouse.

In August 1918, the Red Army launched an offensive from Simbirsk to Bugulma. Already in early October, Nurlat was released, the remains of the executed were placed in a mass grave. A plywood pyramid with a red star was erected at the burial site in 1922. At the moment, the monument to the victims of the civil war is located near the railway station of the city of Nurlat.

=== Soviet period ===
The territory of the region was part of the Chistopolsky district of the Kazan province and the Melekessky district of the Samara province. It belonged to the Chistopol canton of the Tatar ASSR and the Melekessky district of the Samara province from 1920 to 1928. Later from 1928 to 1930, it was included only in the Chistopol canton. In 1930, the territorial reform was completed to abolish the cantons. On August 10 of the same year, the territory was formalized as the newly formed Oktyabrsky District.

Moscow industrial enterprises were evacuated to the Oktyabrsky District during the Great Patriotic War. According to the decision of the State Defense Committee, the "Mosmetrostroy" plant was redesigned for the production of military products and placed in the southern building of the Nurlat railway station. Equipment for the release of Katyusha rocket artillery shells was installed there as well. The plant worked during 1941-1945.

Joseph Stalin three times noted in telegrams the contribution and military feat of the residents of the district: “Give my fraternal greetings and gratitude of the Red Army to the collective farmers of the Oktyabrsky District who collected 2,538,000 rubles for the construction of the "Kolkhoznik Tataria" column, who donated 12,566 poods of grain to the fund of the Red Army, 4,000 poods for industrial workers".

The territory of the district has changed several times. The greater part of the abolished Telmansky district became part of the Oktyabrsky district on July 16, 1958. The borders of the district also underwent significant changes. Part of the territory of the Alkeevsky district, together with the village of Novaya Tumba, was transferred to the Oktyabrsky district on August 19, 1987.

A powerful impetus to the development of the district was given by the development of oil fields, which were found in the 1980s. This helped to strengthen the oil and gas industry in the next decade. Oktyabrsky district was renamed Nurlatsky on December 10, 1997.

=== Contemporary Nurlatsky District ===
After the collapse of the USSR in 1991, Tatarstan made an attempt to secede from Russia and gain independence. In 1992, a referendum was held, following which Tatarstan proclaimed state sovereignty. However, the region decided to remain a part of Russia as a sovereign republic. At the same time, Tatarstan began to pursue an independent socio-economic policy, the districts within the republic received greater independence.

In 1996-2007, the Nurlatsky district was headed by Fatih Sibagatullin, in 2008-2013 by Nail Sharapov. From September 2018 to the present, the head of the Nurlatsky municipal district and the city of Nurlat is Almaz Salimovich Akhmetshin.

== Population ==
According to the 2010 All-Russian Population Census, the region is populated by 3 big national groups. Ethnic composition of the district is following: 51.8% (according to more recent data - 52%) are Tatars, 25.2% (27%) are Chuvash, 21.6% (20% ) are Russians, and 1.4% (1%) is representatives of other nationalities. 57.1% of residents of the district live in urban conditions (Nurlat city).

== Municipal and administrative status ==
Within the framework of administrative divisions, Nurlatsky District is one of the forty-three in the republic. The town of Nurlat serves as its administrative center, despite being incorporated separately as a town of republic significance—an administrative unit with the status equal to that of the districts.

As a municipal division, the district is incorporated as Nurlatsky municipal District, with the town of republic significance of Nurlat being incorporated within it as Nurlat Urban Settlement.

There is 1 urban and 26 rural settlements and 83 settlements within them in the Nurlatsky municipal district. The administrative centers of rural settlements are villages Novaya Amzya, Andreyevka, Akhmetovo, Bikulovo, Bilyar-Ozero, Russkoye Bogdashkino, Burmetyevo, Gaytankino, Yegorkino, Yelaur, Zarechnyy, Kichkalnya, Kulbayevo-Marasa, Mamykovo, Novoye Iglaykino, Novaya Tumba, Selengushi, Srednyaya Kamyshla, Staroye Almetyevo, Staryye Chelny, Stepnoye Ozero, Chuvashskiy Timerlek, Tyurnyasevo, Fomkino, Chulpanovo, Yakushkino, and the city Nurlat.

== Economy ==
=== Industry ===
The Nekrasovskoye field of high-viscosity oil is one of the main natural wealth of the district. Therefore, important branches of the district's economy are oil production and processing, and not only oil processing, but also serving the food industry. Large regional oil enterprises include "Nurlatneft" ("Tatneft"), "Tatnefteprom-Zyuzeevneft", the Nurlatsk drilling enterprise "Tatburneft", "Makoil", "Kara Altyn" and others. More than 2.7 million tons of oil were produced in 2017 in the Nurlatsky district.

Another important branch of the economy is the food industry. Among the large enterprises are the “Nurlat Sete” food factory, which processes 15 tons of milk per day, the “Agroinvest” group of companies, which includes agricultural firms, large farms, and processing industries, the “Nurlatskiy Elevator” (occupies 12 hectares, is capable of store 95.6 thousand tons of raw materials, included in the list of custodians selected for storing grain of the State Intervention Fund), and the Nurlatsky Sugar plant (one of the three sugar factories in Tatarstan, worked for 60 years until January 2020 when declared unprofitable. Other industrial sectors include the production of dairy and bakery products, the production of reinforced concrete products, and timber.)

=== Agriculture ===
There are more than 112 thousand hectares of agricultural land in the Nurlatsky district, of which about 88.3 thousand hectares are occupied by arable land, where grain and fodder crops, corn, and beets are grown. The gross grain harvest amounted to 103.5 thousand tons, the yield was 32.2 centners/ha, which exceeds the average figure for the Republic of Tatarstan in 2019.

The largest regional agricultural organizations are the “A. I. Suleimanov” peasant farm, the “Yuzhnaya” agricultural firm, and the “Nurlat Set” plant. 67 peasant farms have been registered (47 of them are engaged in animal husbandry, 14 in crop production), 15 agricultural enterprises, and 32 farms were operating in the district in 2020.

Livestock and poultry farming is developing in the district. The number of cattle was 19,375, and the average milk yield per cow was 4,544 kg in 2016.

The Nurlatsky district took 15th place in the ranking of the agro-industrial complex of the Republic of Tatarstan, according to the results of 2018.

=== Investment potential ===
The Nurlatsky district is in 16th place according to the rating of the regions of the republic in terms of the quality of life, compiled by the “InKazan” publication in 2019 based on data from the Federal State Statistics Service. The volume of investments in fixed assets per person is about 167 thousand rubles. The average monthly salary is slightly more than 34 thousand rubles. According to the Federal State Statistics Service of the Republic of Tatarstan, investments in fixed assets of the Nurlatsky District (excluding small businesses) amounted to 2.6 billion rubles in the first half of 2020. In 2019 it was 6.6 billion (1.9% of all investments of the Republic of Tatrstan). In 2017 it was 15.9 billion (10th place in Tatarstan).

The largest contribution to the formation of the gross territorial product (about 63%) was made by oil enterprises in 2018. According to the Ministry of Economy of the Republic of Tatarstan, the district had goods of its own production for 19.2 billion rubles and gross agricultural output of 643.8 million rubles in January–October 2020. There are 333 small enterprises and 1049 individual entrepreneurs on the territory of the district.

=== Transport ===
The Nurlatsky district is located in the south of Tatarstan, 220 km from Kazan. The main railway line “Moscow - Ulyanovsk - Ufa” runs through the district.

The main highways: 16K-0098 “Nurlat - Aksubaevo - Chistopol” (to Kazan), 16K-0131 “Nurlat - Kuzaykino” (to Almetyevsk) and its continuation “Nurlat - Koshki - Borma” (to Samara, Ulyanovsk), "Nurlat - Chelno-Tops” and “Mamykovo-Bilyarsk”.

== Environment ==
The ecological situation in the Nurlatsky district is largely determined by the effective measures to protect the environment by the oil-extracting industry. The main types of waste are oil sludge, waste oil products, waste generated during the operation of vehicles and oil equipment, cleaning materials, waste of ferrous and non-ferrous metals. The main focus is on reducing the accident rate on oil pipelines. Water intake facilities have been built to improve the sanitary and ecological situation in the area.

There is a solid domestic waste (MSW) landfill within the city of Nurlat in the Nurlatsky district. It is engaged in the processing of recyclable materials. All types of secondary raw materials, with the exception of polymers, are accepted at special collection points.

41.1% of the area of the Nurlatsky district is covered by forests (on average in the republic is 17.4%). There are oak forests, as well as maple-linden-oak forests. About 180 species of herbaceous plants grow on the territory of the Cheremshansky natural park (it is about 13% of the entire flora of higher plants in Tatarstan). The registered habitat of 104 species of birds and 10 species of small mammals. 22 species of plants and animals listed in the Red Book of Tatarstan have been identified, of which 45, 5% belong to rare species, and 9 are included in the Red Book of Russia. The species composition of the hunting fauna is represented by the following animals and birds: elk, wild boar, lynx, wolf, fox, white hare, European hare, squirrel, marten, forest polecat, steppe polecat, capercaillie, black grouse, hazel grouse and others.

== Social welfare and public life ==
There are 46 secondary schools, 32 children's educational institutions, a correctional boarding school, the Nurlatsk agrarian technical school, a center for children's creativity, and a music school in the Nurlatsky district. The preschool system includes 29 institutions, (two with the Chuvash language). All children from the age of three study English in all city kindergartens.

There is the central district hospital, 5 medical outpatient clinics, a district hospital, 51 feldsher-obstetric stations, and the sanatorium-preventorium “Luchezarny” in the district. There are 50 rural houses of culture and clubs, 48 libraries, 2 Tatar folk theaters, the choir “Veteran”, the Chuvash song ensemble “Rodnik” and others.

There are three museums in the district: the Museum of the History of Kama Region and the city of Nurlat (in the administrative center), the museum of the founder of the Tatar professional theater Gabdulla Kariev (a branch of the State Historical Museum of the Republic of Tatarstan). The Talgat Galiullin Museum was opened in 2020 at the Kichkalninsk school.

A local newspaper “Duslyk” (“Friendship”, “Tuslakh”) is published in the Tatar, Russian and Chuvash languages. The Nurlat TV and Radio Company (Tatmedia branch) operates in two languages.

=== Attractions ===
One of the main attractions of the district is the Water Mill of Prince S. A. Obolensky on the Bolshoy Cheremshan River in the village of Edinenie. The building of the mill is a cultural heritage site of regional importance. The mill was built in 1894-1896 at the expense of one of the largest landowners in Prichemshanye. The building is an example of industrial architecture of the late 19th century in the style of romantic eclecticism.

The current temple in the village of Bilyar-Ozero was built in 1870. Its chapel in honor of the Kazan Icon of the Mother of God was added in 1904. Closed in the 1930s, the temple was returned to the Russian Orthodox Church only in 1990, then the restoration was carried out. The composition of the small Transfiguration Church was made according to the model project of Konstantin Ton, reflecting the classicist direction of eclecticism in the architecture of the second half of the 19th century. The temple is an object of the cultural heritage of regional importance.

A Tatar mosque in the village of Krivoye Ozero with a slender minaret on the roof was built in 1889-1890. The original wooden one-story building was lined with bricks in the late 1990s. Elements of classicism architecture and Tatar decorative and applied art were used in the design of the facades. The mosque is an object of the cultural heritage of regional significance.

== Sources ==
- 6 ноября 1992 г. «Конституция Республики Татарстан», в ред. Закона №79-ЗРТ от 22 ноября 2010 г. «О внесении изменений в статьи 65 и 76 Конституции Республики Татарстан». Опубликован: "Ведомости Верховного Совета Татарстана", №9–10, ст. 166, 1992. (November 6, 1992 Constitution of the Republic of Tatarstan, as amended by the Law #79-ZRT of November 22, 2010 On Amending Articles 65 and 76 of the Constitution of the Republic of Tatarstan. ).
- Государственный Совет Республики Татарстан. Закон №32-ЗРТ от 31 января 2005 г. «Об установлении границ территорий и статусе муниципального образования "Нурлатский муниципальный район" и муниципальных образований в его составе», в ред. Закона №110-ЗРТ от 20 ноября 2008 г «О преобразовании Фомкинского сельского поселения Нурлатского муниципального района и внесении изменений в Закон Республики Татарстан "Об установлении границ территорий и статусе муниципального образования "Нурлатский муниципальный район" и муниципальных образований в его составе"». Вступил в силу со дня официального опубликования. Опубликован: "Республика Татарстан", №№18–19, 1 февраля 2005 г. (State Council of the Republic of Tatarstan. Law #32-ZRT of January 31, 2005 On Establishing the Borders of the Territories and the Status of the Municipal Formation of "Nurlatsky Municipal District" and of the Municipal Formations It Comprises, as amended by the Law #110-ZRT of November 20, 2008 On the Transformation of Fomkinskoye Rural Settlement of Nurlatsky Municipal District and on Amending the Law of the Republic of Tatarstan "On Establishing the Borders of the Territories and the Status of the Municipal Formation of "Nurlatsky Municipal District" and of the Municipal Formations It Comprises". Effective as of the official publication date.).
- Министерство юстиции Республики Татарстан. Приказ №01-02/9 от 4 февраля 2014 г. «Об утверждении реестра административно-территориальных единиц и населённых пунктов в Республике Татарстан», в ред. Приказа №01-02/160 от 11 марта 2015 г. «О внесении изменений в Приказ Министерства юстиции Республики Татарстан от 04.02.2014 №01-02/9 "Об утверждении реестра административно-территориальных единиц и населённых пунктов в Республике Татарстан"». Опубликован: Официальный сайт правовой информации Министерства юстиции Республики Татарстан (http://pravo.tatarstan.ru), 27 февраля 2014 г. (Ministry of Justice of the Republic of Tatarstan. Order #01-02/9 of February 4, 2014 On the Adoption of the Registry of the Administrative-Territorial Units and Inhabited Localities in the Republic of Tatarstan, as amended by the Order #01-02/160 of March 11, 2015 On Amending the Order of the Ministry of Justice of the Republic of Tatarstan #01-02/9 of February 4, 2014 "On the Adoption of the Registry of the Administrative-Territorial Units and Inhabited Localities in the Republic of Tatarstan". ).
- Государственный Совет Республики Татарстан. Закон №116-ЗРТ от 7 декабря 2005 г. «Об административно-территориальном устройстве Республики Татарстан», в ред. Закона №54-ЗРТ от 2 июля 2015 г. «О внесении изменения в статью 14 Закона Республики Татарстан "Об административно-территориальном устройстве Республики Татарстан"». Вступил в силу через три месяца со дня официального опубликования, за исключением части второй статьи 31, которая вступает в силу со дня официального опубликования. Опубликован: "Республика Татарстан", №247, 10 декабря 2005 г. (State Council of the Republic of Tatarstan. Law #116-ZRT of December 7, 2005 On the Administrative-Territorial Structure of the Republic of Tatarstan, as amended by the Law #54-ZRT of July 2, 2015 On Amending Article 14 of the Law of the Republic of Tatarstan "On the Administrative-Territorial Structure of the Republic of Tatarstan". Effective as of the day which is three months after the day of the official publication, with the exception of part two of Article 31, which takes effect on the day of the official publication.).
- "Nurlat rayonı/Нурлат районы". Tatar Encyclopaedia (in Tatar). Kazan: The Republic of Tatarstan Academy of Sciences. Institution of the Tatar Encyclopaedia. 2002.
- Поспелов, Е. М. (2008). Географические названия России. Топонимический словарь [Geographical names of Russia. Toponymic Dictionary] (in Russian). Москва: АСТ, Астрель. pp. 1–523. ISBN 978-5-17-054966-5.

== Bibliography ==
- Abaydulova, A.G.; Salmin, A.K. (2018). "Pricheremshanskij dnevnik jekspedicii P. S. Pallasa [Cheremshansky diary of the expedition of P. S. Pallas]". Uchenye Zapiski Kazanskogo Universiteta. 160 (3).
- Kurushina, D.A. (2017). "Osobennosti ispol'zovanija zemel' v granicah pamjatnika prirody "Chirmeshjen bolynnary" Nurlatskogo municipal'nogo rajona respubliki Tatarstan [Peculiarities of land use within the boundaries of the natural monument "Chirmeshen Bolynnary" of the Nurlat municipal district of the Republic of Tatarstan]" (PDF). Problemy I Perspektivy Razvitija Zemel'no-Imushhestvennyh Otnoshenij Na Sovremennom Jetape. 160 (3): 111–117.
- Nadyrova, Kh. G. (2012). Gradostroitel'naja kul'tura tatarskogo naroda i ego predkov [Urban culture of the Tatar people and their ancestors]. Kazan: KGASU.
- Salakhov, N.S.; Arkhipova, N.S. (2013). Rastitel'nyj mir respubliki Tatarstan. Uchebnometodicheskoe posobie [The flora of the Republic of Tatarstan. Educational Methodological guide]. Kazan: KPFU.
- Senator, S. A. (2016). "Floristicheskoe bogatstvo fiziko-geograficheskih rajonov i shema floristicheskogo rajonirovanija Srednego Povolzh'ja [Floristic wealth of physical-geographical regions and the scheme of floristic zoning of the Middle Volga region]". Povolzhsky Ekologichesky Zhurnal (1): 94–105.
- Zigashin, I.I.; Ivanov, D.V.; Tomaeva, I.F. (2015). Ekologicheskii gid po zelenym ugolkam Respubliki Tatarstan [Ecological guide to the nature of the Republic of Tatarstan] (PDF). Kazan: Foliant.
