= Mongol invasion of Volga Bulgaria =

1223–1236 invasions of the Bulgar state by the Mongol Empire

- Part of the Mongol invasions and conquests
Date	1223 (first), 1229–1230 (second), and 1236 AD (third)
Location	Volga Bulgaria
Result	Mongol victory
Territorial changes	Bulgar territories added to Mongol Empire

Belligerents
Mongol Empire	Volga Bulgaria

Commanders and leaders
Subutai; Jebe (1223); Sunitay and Kukedey (1229–1230); Batu and Subutai (1236)	Ghabdula Chelbir

Units involved
Predominantly horse archers and other cavalry	Unknown

Strength
1223: Less than 20,000; 1229: 20,000; 1236: ~35,000	Unknown

Casualties and losses
Unknown	Heavy

The Mongol invasion of Volga Bulgaria lasted from 1223 to 1236. The Bulgar state, centered in lower Volga and Kama, was the center of the fur trade in Eurasia throughout most of its history. Before the Mongol conquest, Russians of Novgorod and Vladimir repeatedly looted and attacked the area, thereby weakening the Bulgar state's economy and military power. The latter ambushed the Mongols in the later 1223 or in 1224. Several clashes occurred between 1229–1234, and the Mongol Empire conquered the Bulgars in 1236.

== Chronicle collections ==
Strengthening the power and strengthening the Tatar (Mongol) troops allowed Batu to move on to the task of capturing the Middle and Lower Volga. The Bulgars (Oghurs) lived on the Middle Volga, and the Lower Volga had always been under the Polovtsians (Kipchaks). The Arab author of the late 13th century Ibn Vasil reports:

"in 627 (1229/30) the flames of war broke out between the Tatars (Mongol tribes) and the Kipchaks (Polovtsians)."

Genghis Khan gave Jochi the task of continuing his conquests in Eastern Europe, but he evaded it. Then Genghis Khan sent Jebe and Subedei to Transcaucasia and the Black Sea steppes.

In 1222, the Polovtsians (Kipchaks) succumbed to the persuasion of the Tatars (Mongols) and broke their alliance with the Alans, after which the Tatar (Mongol) army invaded the Polovtsian steppes (Crimea, Azov, Caspian, Lower Volga) from the North Caucasus. The late Tver Chronicle reports on the reaction of Mstislav of Kiev to the news of the approach of the Tatar (Mongols) to the borders of Rus':

"So long as I am in Kiev, on this side of the Laik, the Pontic Sea, and the Danube, the Tatar sabre cannot be brandished."

The Polovtsian Khan Kotyan Sutoevich, together with other Polovtsian khans, turned to his son-in-law, the Galician Prince Mstislav Mstislavich Udatny, and other Russian princes, asking for their help against the new formidable enemy:

"Our land has been taken away today, and yours will be taken tomorrow when they come."

Kotyan supported his words with large gifts to the Galician prince. Mstislav Udatny took the initiative in organizing a congress of princes to discuss a campaign against the approaching Tatars (Mongols). He said that if the Russian princes did not help the Polovtsians (Cuman), they could join the Tatar (Mongols), and then the danger would be greater.

After which the famous "Battle on the Kalka River" of 1221-1224 took place. On the way back, the Tatars (Mongols) met the Bulgars for the first time and suffered a defeat, they remembered this for a long time and did not forgive them for this disgrace.

The original text comes from the Laurentian Chronicle according to the Suzdal copy, and it dates from 1377, one of the oldest surviving Russian chronicles, based on earlier chronicle collections, including materials from the 13th century. In 1236, when the Tatars (Mongol) under the leadership of Batu began their conquest of the Volga Bulgaria, a Russian annalist wrote:

«В лѣто 6744. Приидоша отъ восточныя страны в Болгарскую землю безбожнии Татари, и взяша славныи Великыи городъ Болгарскыи, и избиша оружьемъ от старца и до унаго и до сущаго младенца, и взяша товара множество, а городъ ихъ пожгоша огнемъ, и всю землю ихъ поплениша.»

i.e.,

"In the autumn of 6744 (1236), there came from the countries of the East into the Bulgar lands the godless Tatars and sacked the good city of Bolgar and killed everyone from the old to the young and the tiniest suckling, and looted a lot of goods, and set the city on fire, and captured the whole of their land."

Later, when the Polovtsian Kipchaks became subjects of the Tatars (Mongol tribes), the ethnonym Tatars was transferred to the Kipchaks, since they merged into a single people, as Ibn Fadlallah al-Umari noted, that through generations, the real Tatars (Mongols) dissolved in the Kipchaks and looked the same with them, as if there were no differences. The language of the Golden Horde became the predominant Kipchak, becoming the state language, and after the reforms of Khan Uzbek, Islam became the state religion.

== The Mongol campaigns ==
In 1223, after defeating Russian and Cuman/Kipchak armies at the Battle of Kalka, a Mongol army under the generals Subutai and Jebe was sent to subdue Volga Bulgaria. Genghis Khan's troops were seen as invincible at that time. However, in late 1223 (or 1224), the Bulgars may have fought with the Mongols. There is no historical mention except a short account by the Arab historian Ibn al-Athir, writing in Mosul some 1,800 km (1,100 mi) away from the event. After several sharp skirmishes with the Bulgars, the tiring Mongols moved back down to the Volga. Meanwhile, the Rus continuously attacked the Bulgar State trying to attain supremacy over their wealthy region. In 1229, Ögedei Khan, sent another Mongol army under the command of Kukday and Bubedey to conquer the region. This force defeated Bulgar frontier guards at the Ural River and occupied the upper Ural valley. In 1232 the Mongol cavalry subjugated the southeastern part of the Bashkiria and occupied southern portions of Volga Bulgaria.

Led by Batu Khan, Mongol forces numbering 25-35,000 invaded Europe in 1236. The Mongols besieged and sacked Bilär, Bolghar, Suar, Cükätaw, and most other cities and castles of Volga Bulgaria; killing or enslaving virtually all inhabitants. Volga Bulgaria became a part of the Ulus Jochi, later known as the Golden Horde. The territory was later divided into duchies; each of which eventually received or gained varying levels of autonomy as vassals of the Golden Horde.

== Population transfer ==
The surviving agricultural population was forced to leave the steppe lands. The majority settled along the Kama river and in adjacent areas further north. The area around Kazan, which was settled by Mari people some years before, became the nucleus of the ("Kazan Tatar") population. Kazan and Çallı became new major political and trade centers.

Some cities, such as Bolghar and Cükätaw, were rebuilt, but they were primarily trading centers and the population was not, for the most part, Bolgar .

== Rebellions ==
After the Mongols left Volga Bulgaria to conquer the Russian land, the Bulgars rebelled, led by the nobility. The Mongols then returned and put down the rebellions.

== Impact on the region ==
According to some historians, over 80% of the country's population was killed during the invasion. The remaining population mostly relocated to the northern forested areas (territories of modern Chuvashia and Tatarstan). Some autonomous duchies appeared in those areas. The southern steppe areas of Volga Bulgaria may have been settled by nomadic Kipchaks, and agricultural development suffered a severe decline.

Over time, the cities of Volga Bulgaria were rebuilt and became trade and craft centers of the Golden Horde. Some Bulgarians, primarily masters and craftsmen, were forcibly moved to Sarai and other southern cities of the Golden Horde. Volga Bulgaria remained a center of agriculture and handicraft.

=== Ethnolinguistic impact ===
The population of Volga Bulgaria was mostly Muslim. Under the influence of Bulgar culture, more and more nomadic Mongols and Kipchaks were converted to Islam. The language used by Muslims of the Golden Horde transformed into the Kipchak language, adopted by all Muslim Volga Bulgars. As a result of a later mixing of Kipchak and Bulgar, the literary language of the Golden Horde became what is now called the Old Tatar language, and eventually evolved into the modern Tatar language. Some of Bulgaria's non-Islamic population kept the Bulgar language, which was influenced by the Mari language, a language commonly used in the territories to which they had relocated. This led to the development of the modern Chuvash language.

Some historians hypothesize that during the rule of the Mongols, the ethnic makeup of the population of Volga Bulgaria did not change, remaining largely Bulgar and partly Finno-Ugric. Alternatively, some hypothesize that some Kipchaks and Russians were forcibly relocated to Bulgaria. Undoubtedly, some Bulgars were forcibly relocated to the territory of modern Astrakhan Oblast, the population of which was previously nomadic.

Volga Bulgaria's Muslim community preferred to call themselves Muslims (Möselmannar), but used the word Bulghar to distinguish themselves from nomadic Muslim Kipchaks. They did not call themselves Tatars until the 19th century. Russian sources originally distinguished Volga Bulgars from nomadic Tatars, but later the word "Tatar" became synonymous with "Turkic Muslim". To distinguish between themselves, they started to use names of the khanates: the population of Khanate of Kazan called themselves the people of Kazan (Qazanlı); this name was also used by the steppe Tatars and by the Russians.

== Sources ==
- "Mongol invasion of Volga Bulgaria". Tatar Encyclopaedia (in Tatar). Kazan: The Republic of Tatarstan Academy of Sciences. Institution of the Tatar Encyclopaedia. 2002.
