= Tatar-Mongols =

Tatar Mongols may refer to:

- Mongols, see Tatar (Mongolia)
- Tatar confederation
- The Golden Horde
