= Chistopolsky District =

Chistopolsky District Чистопольский район (Russian)
- District

Other transcription(s)
  - Tatar: Чистай районы
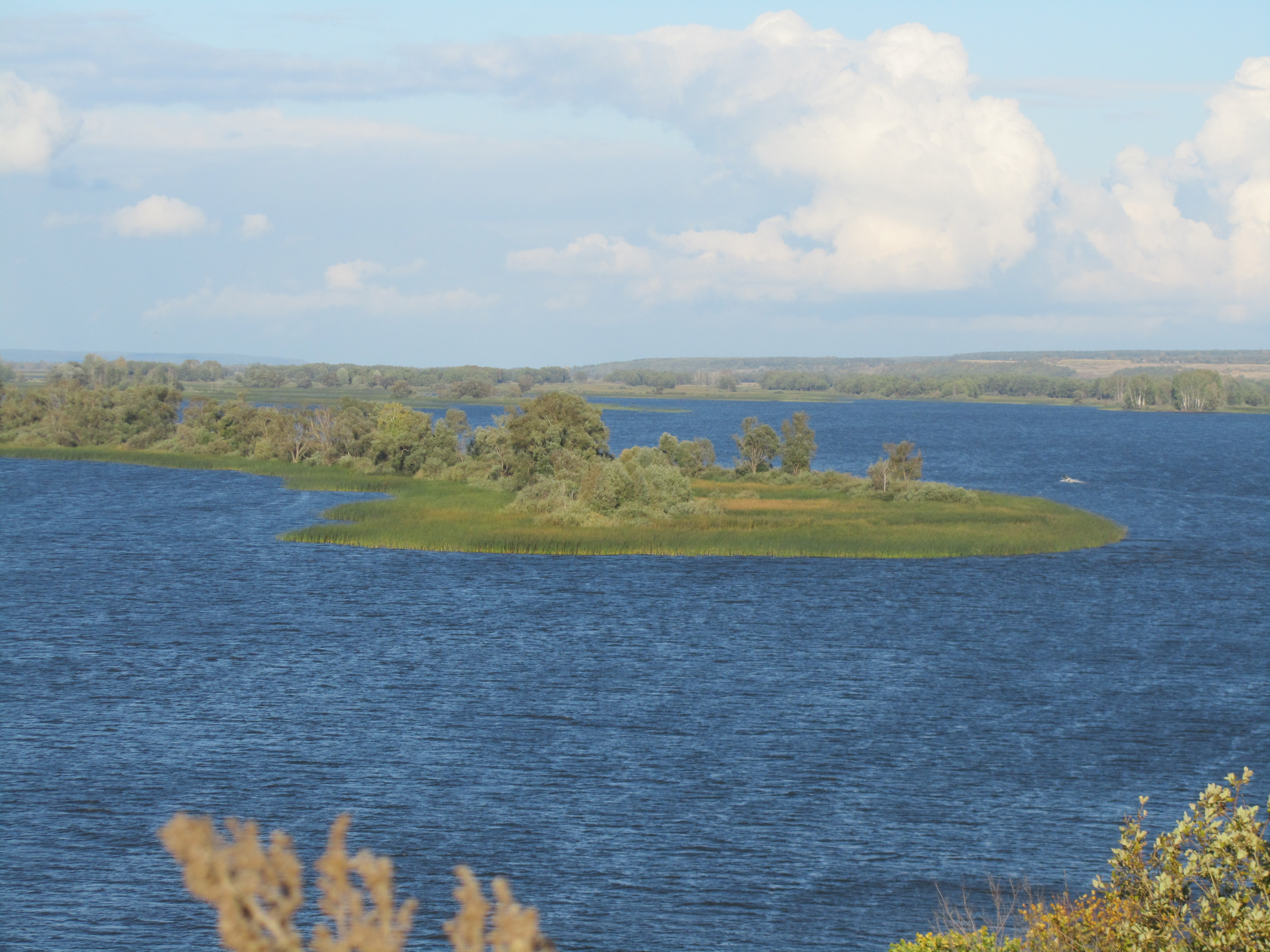
- Horseshoe bend, Kama, Chistopolsky District

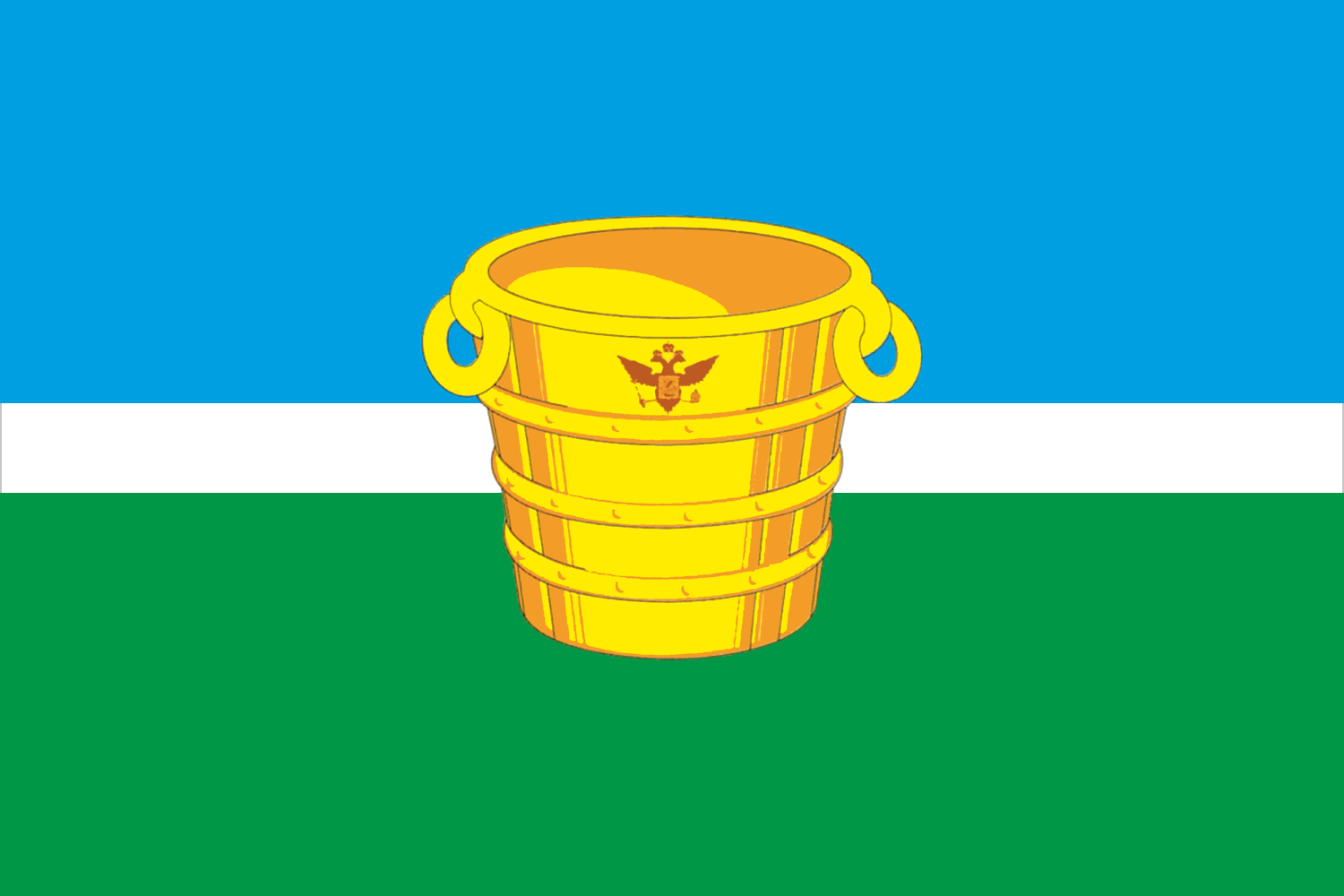
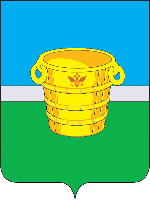
- Flag Coat of arms
- Location of Chistopolsky District in the Republic of Tatarstan
- Coordinates: 55°17′N 50°42′E
- Country: Russia
- Federal subject: Republic of Tatarstan
- Established: 10 August 1930
- Administrative center: Chistopol

Area
  - Total: 1,823 km^{2} (704 sq mi)

Population (2010 Census)
  - Total: 19,406
  - Density: 10.65/km^{2} (27.57/sq mi)
  - Urban: 0%
  - Rural: 100%

Administrative structure
  - Inhabited localities: 59 rural localities

Municipal structure
  - Municipally incorporated as: Chistopolsky Municipal District
  - Municipal divisions: 1 urban settlements, 23 rural settlements
- Time zone: UTC+3 (MSK)
- OKTMO ID: 92659000
- Website: http://chistopol.tatarstan.ru/

Chistopolsky District (Russian: Чистопольский райо́н; Tatar: Чистай районы) is a territorial administrative unit and municipal district of the Republic of Tatarstan within the Russian Federation. The district is located in the center of Tatarstan on the left bank of the Kama River. The administrative center of the district is Chistopol. At the beginning of 2020, the district had a population of 75,675.

The first mention of settlements in the region dates back to the 10th century. The ancient city of Cükätaw is also mentioned as having been located there. The area is also known for hosting the Union of Soviet Writers after their evacuation during the Great Patriotic War. Such famous Soviet authors as Boris Pasternak, Leonid Leonov, Alexander Fadeev lived in Chistopol for several years.

The Chistopolsky district is primarily an agricultural district. In 2017, the administrative center received its designation as one of the "Territories of advanced social and economic development" or TASED in the republic.

== Geography ==
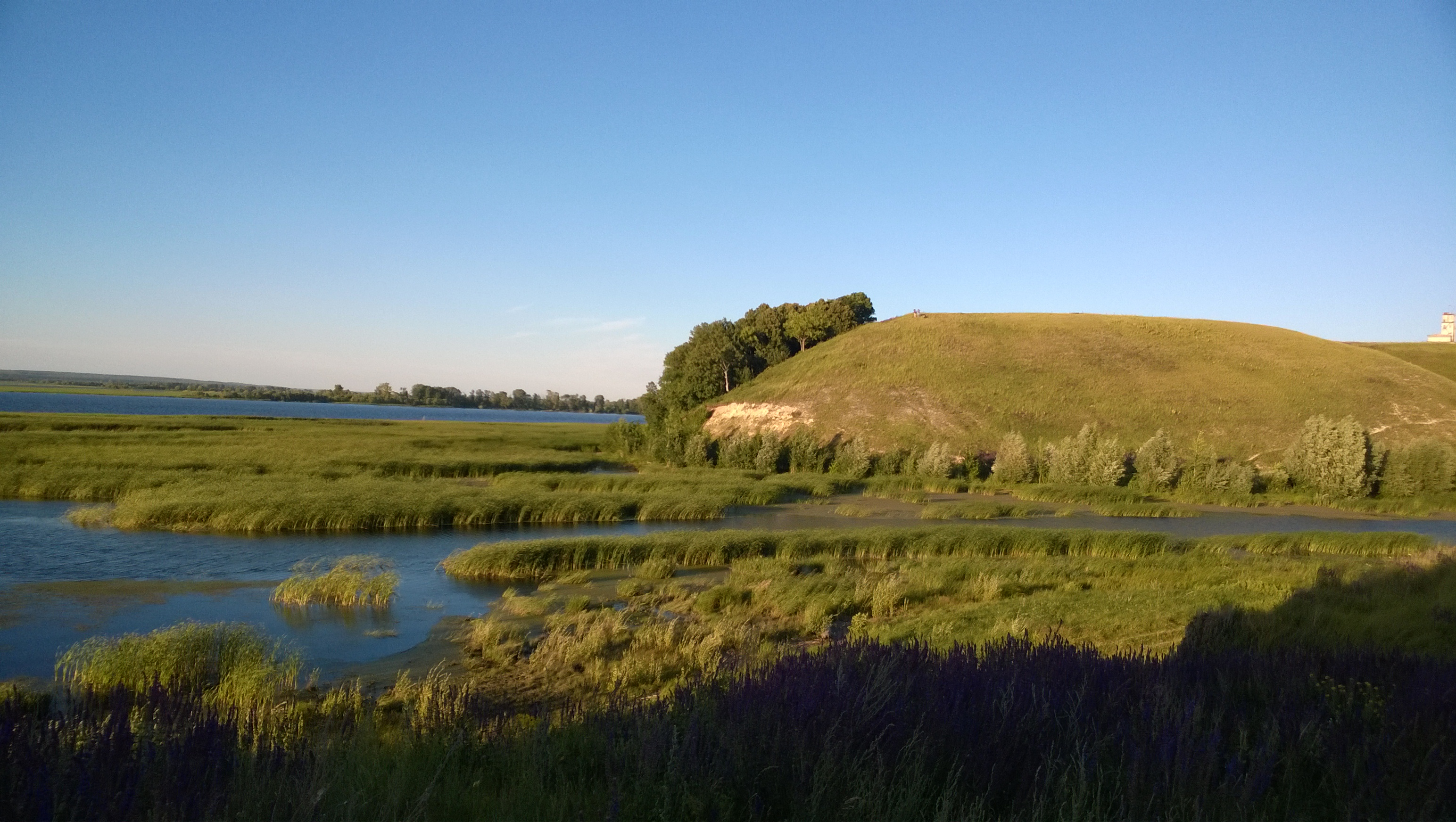
Steep mountain

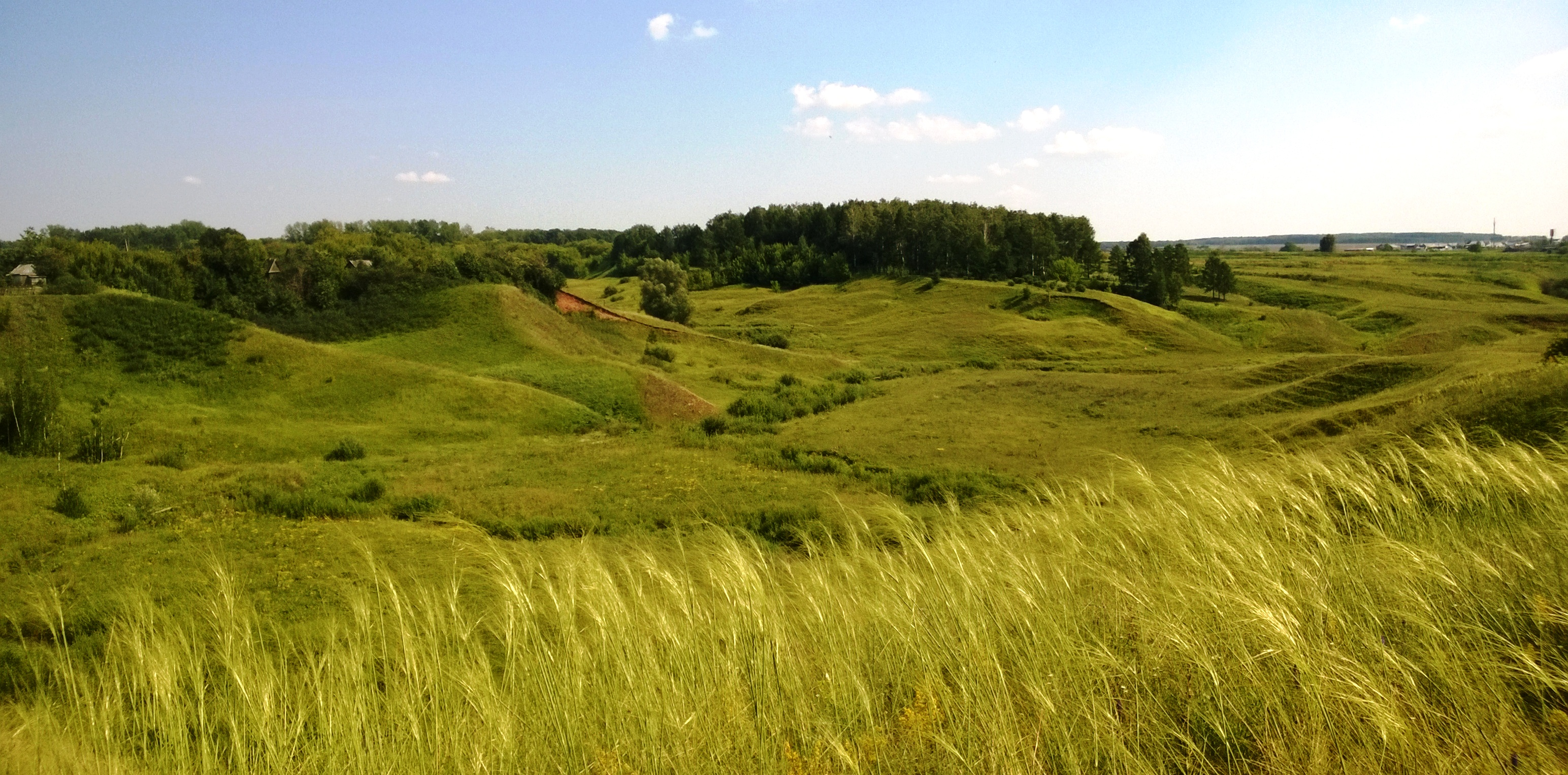
The road to Zmievo

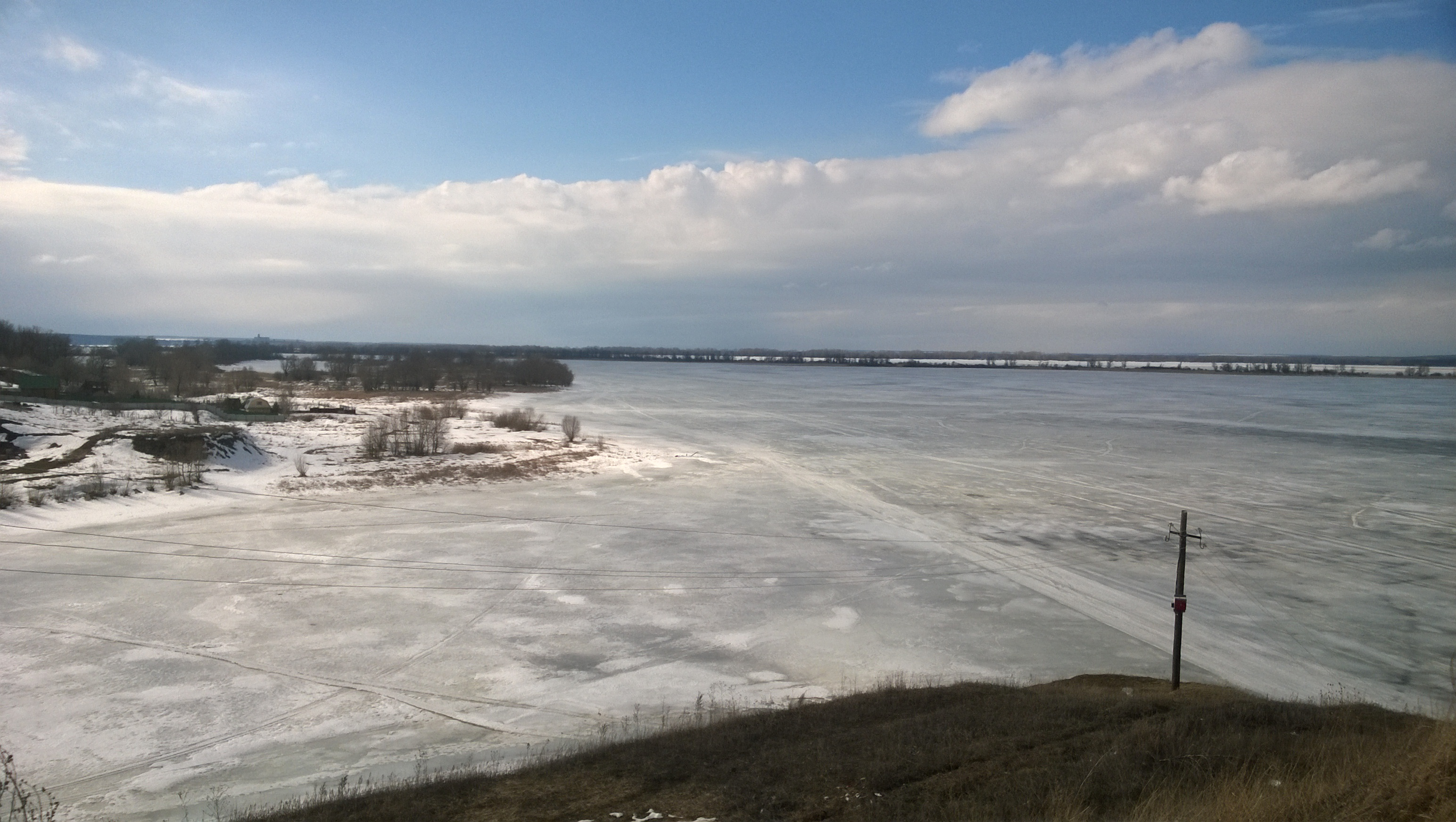
Mouth of small rivers

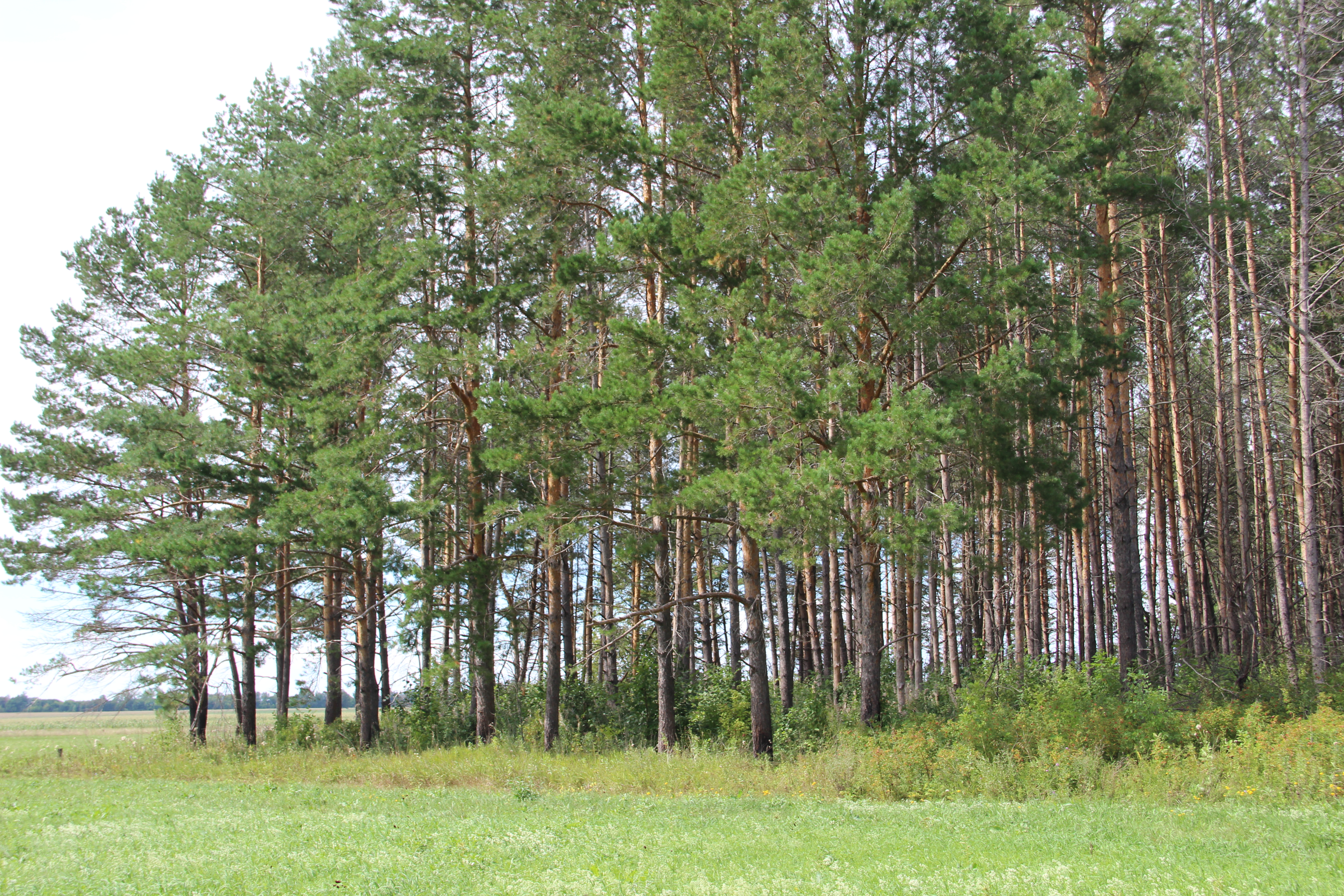
Novoderevensky forest

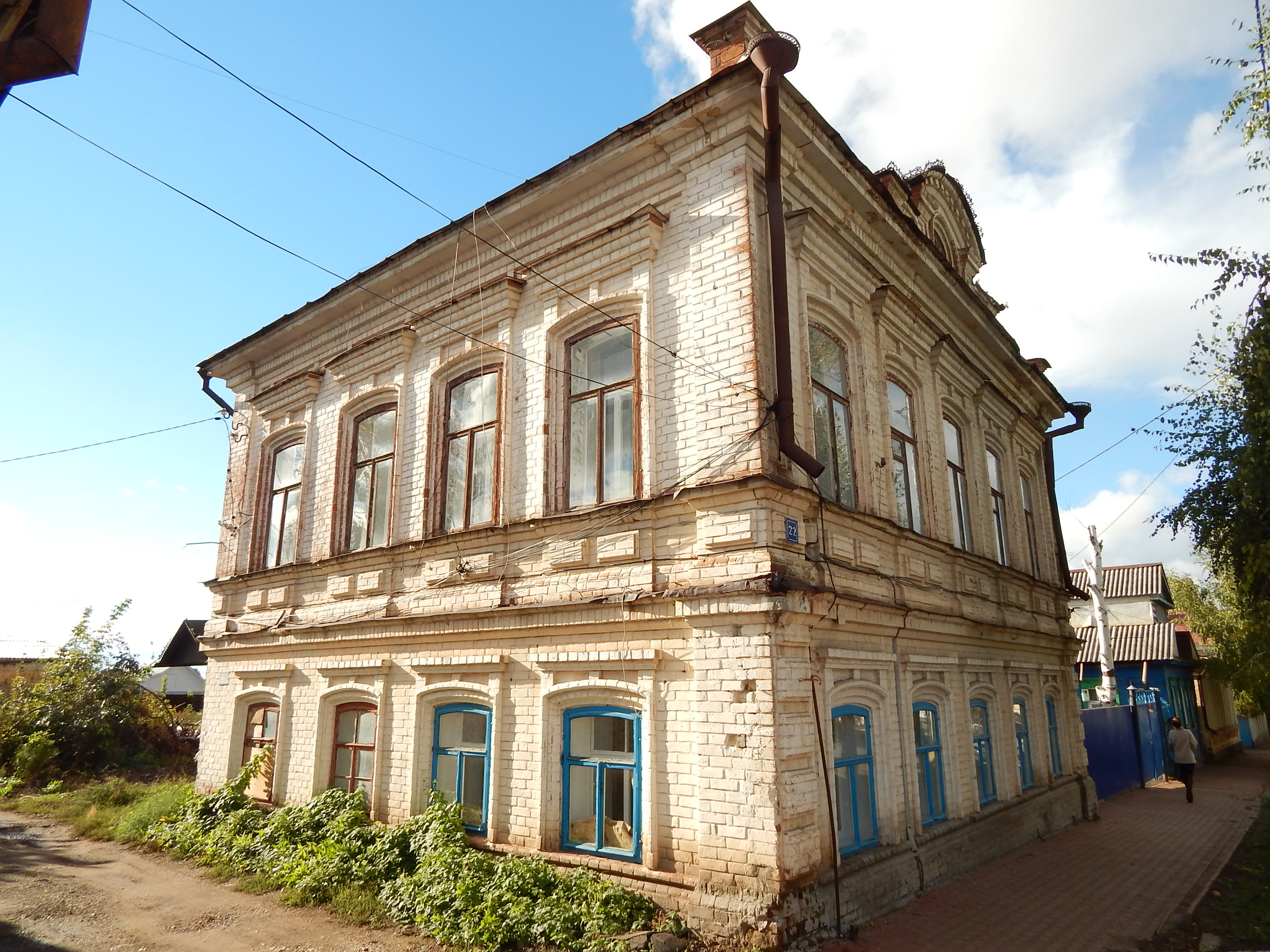
House of writer L. Leonov and poet I. Selvinsky

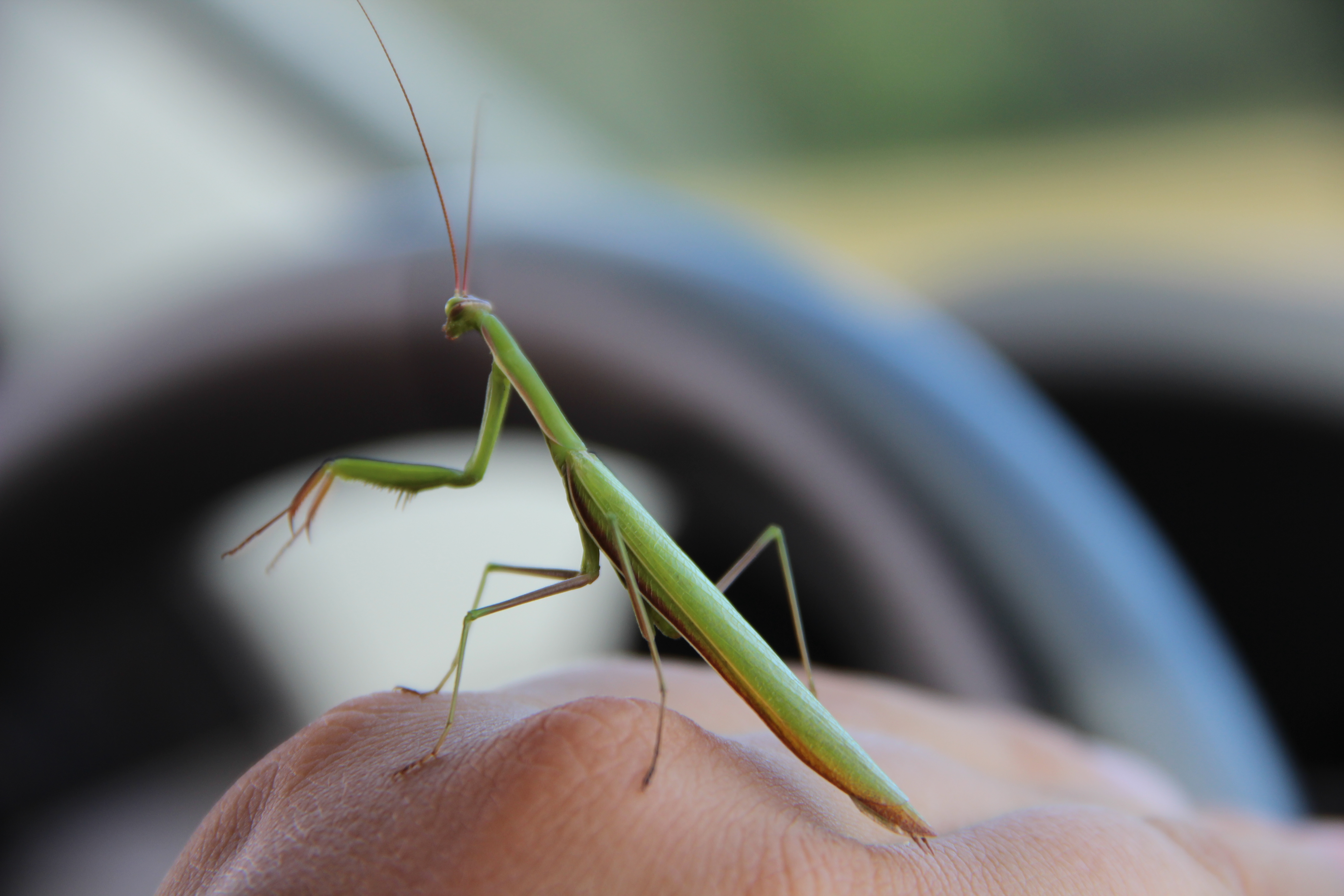
Local praying mantis

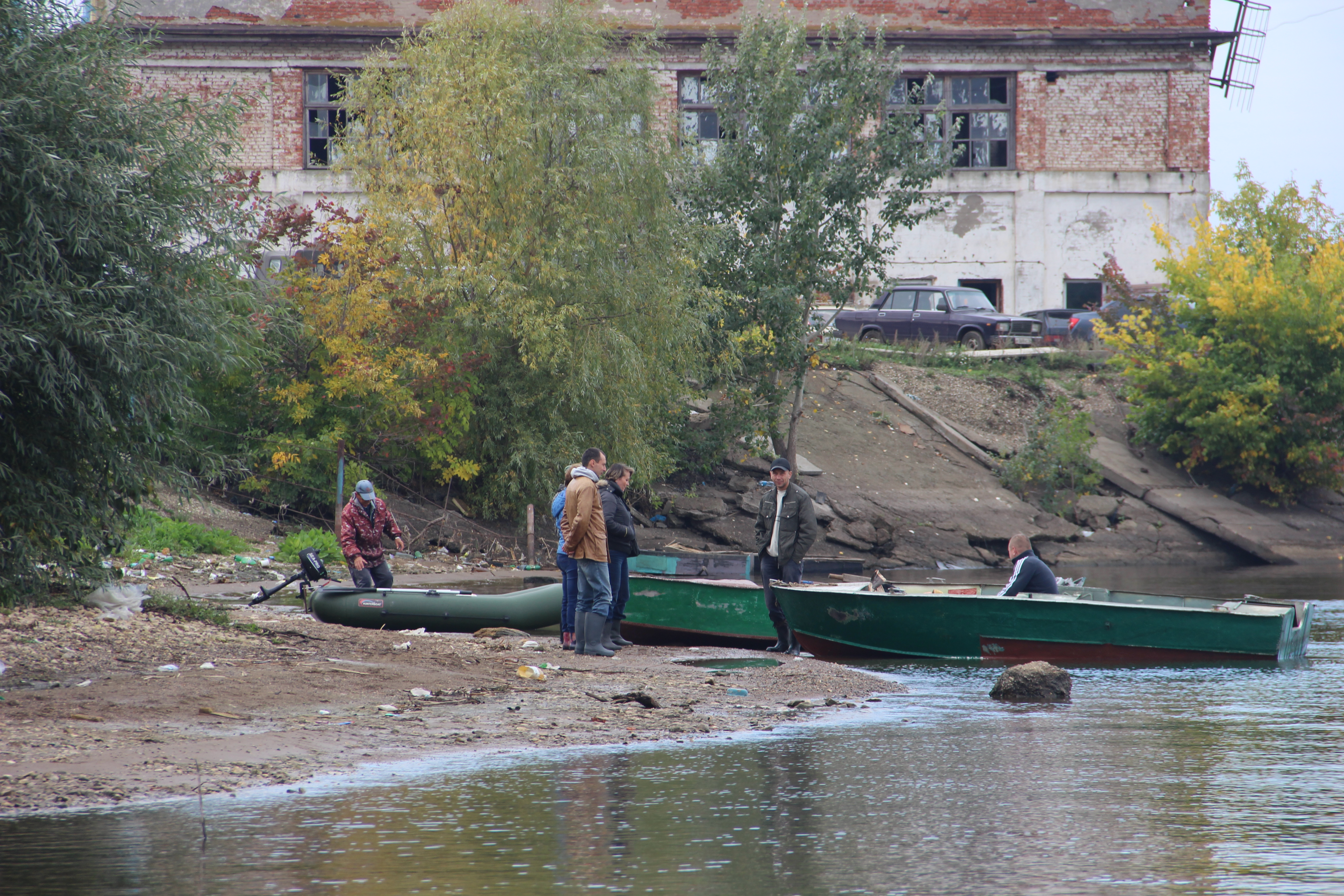
View of the building of the River Port on Kama

The Chistopolsky district is located in the center of Tatarstan on the left bank of the Kama river. It borders the Alekseevsky district, Rybno-Slobodsky, Mamadyshsky, Nizhnekamsky, Novosheshminsky and Aksubaevsky districts of Tatarstan. The district encompasses a total land area of 1823 km². The region possesses reserves of oil, coal and other mineral resources.

== Coat of arms and flag ==
The main colors making up the field of the coat of arms are blue and green with a narrow silver belt passing horizontally through its center. Superimposed on them is a gold grain measure with the Russian state eagle. The coat of arms symbolizes the economic, natural and historical characteristics of the region. Green refers to spring, health, nature and fertility. Silver symbolizes small rivers that are prominent in the region. The Kama River is represented by the upper azure section of the flag and arms, symbolizing lofty aspirations, honor, glory, devotion and immortality.

== History ==
=== Background ===
The region is famous for the old city of Cükätaw which existed in the 10th century during the time of the Volga Bulgaria. After the Mongol invasion in the 13th century, Cükätaw became the capital of an independent principality. The local population of Cükätaw were mostly engaged in the pottery trade and blacksmithing. On the other side of the Kama were settlements of Novgorodians. The neighbors constantly engaged in skirmishes and in 1391 the Novgorodians plundered Cükätaw. In 1431, Prince Fyodor Motley inflicted a final blow upon the settlement and the entire population of the city gradually left for Kazan. The lands on the banks of the Kama remained empty until the 17th century.

The village of Chistoe Pole was formed in the 17th century. Later Chistoe Pole formed the basis of current day Chistopol. According to one version, the name "Chistoe Pole" comes from the fact that the settlement was founded by fugitive peasants, but soon it was burned down. The revived village was named after the wasteland. By decree of Peter the Great, the territory around the village began to be actively built up. The villages of Buldyr, Sarsazy, Elantovo, Tolkish were built thanks to peasants from the inner provinces that were resettled there. In 1781, Chistye Pole was given the status of a uezd, as well as assuming its modern name. The choice of Chistopol as a county town was due to its geographical position on the Kama river. At the beginning of the 20th century the city had become a major center of grain trade.

The Chistopol district was formed as an independent entity on August 10, 1930. At that time the district included 19 volosts. In 1942, Chistopol was subordinated to the Tatar A.S.S.R and the district became a site for the evacuation of large Moscow factories during the battle of Moscow as well as allied and Soviet writers who were resettled here. Among the evacuated factories was the popular Vostok watch enterprise that would make Chistopol famous all over the world. On July 16, 1958, most of the abolished Kyzyl-Army region of the Tatar Autonomous Soviet Socialist Republic was incorporated into the region.

=== Present-day Chistopol district ===
The development of the district in the 2000s is largely associated with the former Minister of Construction of the republic, Marat Khusnullin who controlled half of the city's largest enterprises. After Khusnullin moved to Moscow, most of these enterprises had fallen into bankruptcy.

From 2000 to 2010, the Chistopol district was headed by Vyacheslav Kozlov who was later replaced by Ildus Akhmetzyanov. Since October 2015, the head of the municipal district has been Dmitry Alekseevich Ivanov.

== Population ==
As of the year 2020, 75,675 people were registered in the district, 77.82% of which resided in urban settlements. The ethnic composition of the region according to the 2010 census is composed of Tatars and Russians who make up 40.1% and 55.4% of the population respectively, with the remaining 4.5% being made up by representatives of other nationalities.

== Municipal-territorial structure ==
In the Chistopol municipal district there are 1 urban and 23 rural settlements comprising a further 61 settlements within them. The main administrative center of the district is the city of Chistopol.

== Economy ==
=== Industry ===
Chistopol is a monotown (company town). The main town-forming enterprise is the Vostok watch factory which remained in the city after its military evacuation from Moscow in the 1940s. In wartime, the plant carried out defense orders. After the end of the war it switched to consumer products which continue to be regularly supplied to the foreign market. In 2010, the plant went bankrupt, but in only three years its founders were able to successfully reorganize the company. The company currently employs about 450 workers and had a revenue of 756 million rubles in 2016.

Another large regional enterprise is the Betar company, a manufacturer of energy metering devices. According to published data from 2016, Betar's revenue amounted to 2.2 billion rubles. The number of employees at the enterprise is about 600, a number which constitutes a full 1% of the population of Chistopol.

=== Agriculture ===
Local farmers cultivate wheat, winter rye, barley, oats, and peas. The main livestock industries in the district are meat and dairy cattle breeding, pig and poultry farming, sheep breeding and fur farming. In 2020, the Ak Bars Holding bought out the Chistopol egg factory in order to re-equip it for meat production. The declared capacity of this facility is 14 buildings. The Ak Bars Poultry Complex in the district raises various European hybrid breeds of broiler chickens, after which they are shipped to a second stage of production in Pestretsy.

Companies such as "Krasny Vostok Argo", "Khuzangaevskoe" and "Volga-Select" grow crops commercially in the district. In 2020, the Chistopolskaya agricultural company harvested 39.1 thousand tons of grain helping to bring the region into 13th place in the ranking of regions of the Republic of Tatarstan in terms of harvest yield.

The Ministry of Agriculture and Food of the Republic provides grants to small and medium-sized businesses in the agricultural sector, for example, for vegetable farming or the growing forage crops.

=== Investment potential ===
In 2011, local authorities initiated the creation of the Chistopol industrial park which encompasses 292 hectares of land in the district. The federal budget allocated 592 million rubles and 41.5 million rubles were contributed from the regional budget for the creation of the Chistopol industrial park. The residents of the park were exempted from land taxes and land leases for the periods of construction and reaching of design capacity (up to 7 years), while property tax was reduced to 0.1% (instead of 2.2%), and the income tax paid by residents was also reduced to 13.5% (from 20%).

The first resident of the park was Delrus, a medical equipment manufacturing company. At the first stage of construction, about 60 million rubles were invested in the project. The total volume of investment, taking into account the opening of the second stage, amounted to about 700 million rubles. In 2018, the Chinese meat processing enterprise Jing Feng announced an international partnership with the Chistopol Park. Jin Feng intended to establish production facilities on 6 hectares, having invested 80 million rubles into the project.

In December 2017, Prime Minister of Russia Dmitry Medvedev signed a decree on the creation of a TASED in Chistopol. Investment projects of this program have been implemented since 2018. In two years, more than 500 jobs were created with the help of TASED residents. As for the first quarter of 2020, the TASED in the district had 16 residents and attracted an annual volume of investment amounting to 650 million rubles.

=== Transport ===
As of the beginning of 2020, the Chistopol region was serviced by 171.5 km of regional and intermunicipal highways. A section of the federal highway R-239 "Kazan - Orenburg" and a section of the highway "Europe - Western China" is under construction are planned to pass through the territory of the district. There are no railways in the district.

== Ecology ==
Several tributaries of the Kama flow through the territory of Chistopol (the Rzhavets, Bernyazhka and Kilevka). The district regularly hosts volunteers to clean up garbage from its riverbanks. In 2019, action taken by the authorities against the local company Chistopol-Vodokanal was responsible for a change in the color of the water in the Kileva River (near the village of Krutaya Gora) after the firm was ordered to eliminate the discharge of pollutants into the river.

== Social sphere ==
The region has 43 houses of culture, 40 libraries and three museums. In 1980 the museum of Boris Pasternak was opened in the apartment he resided in during the Great Patriotic War. The museum exhibition includes some of the poet's personal belongings and his work desk. During his time in Chistopol Pasternak started working on his famous novel Doctor Zhivago.

Starting in 2013, local authorities began to seriously prioritize the preservation of cultural heritage sites and historical monuments. Particular attention in this regard has focused on the city center of Chistopol.

The region is actively developing as a tourist destination. The administrative center is included on the itinerary of the program "One thousand and one pleasures for the weekend", developed as part of a joint project for the exchange of tourists from Tatarstan and the Samara region (the proceeds from this project remain in the local budget).

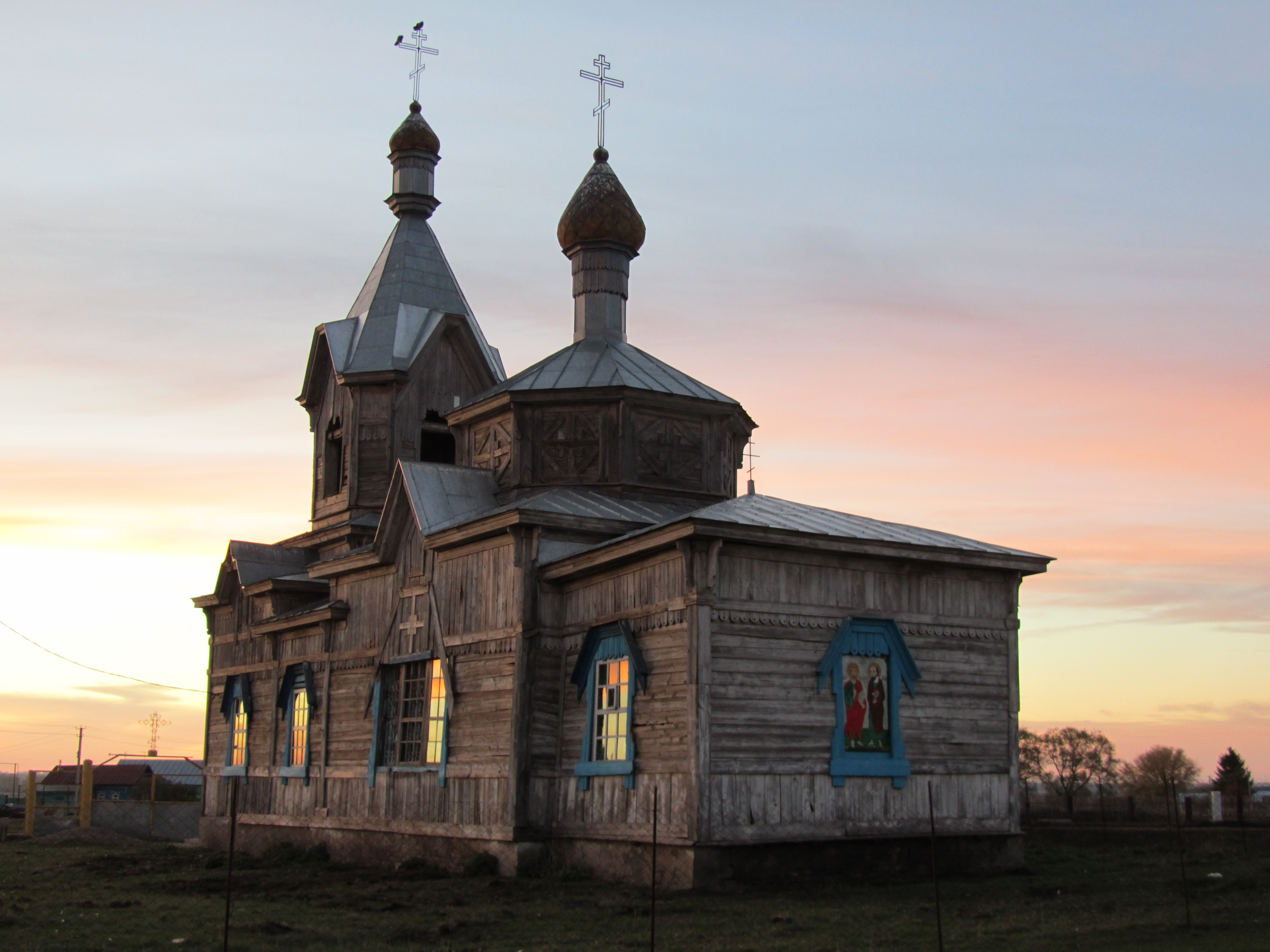
Церковь в деревня Бахта

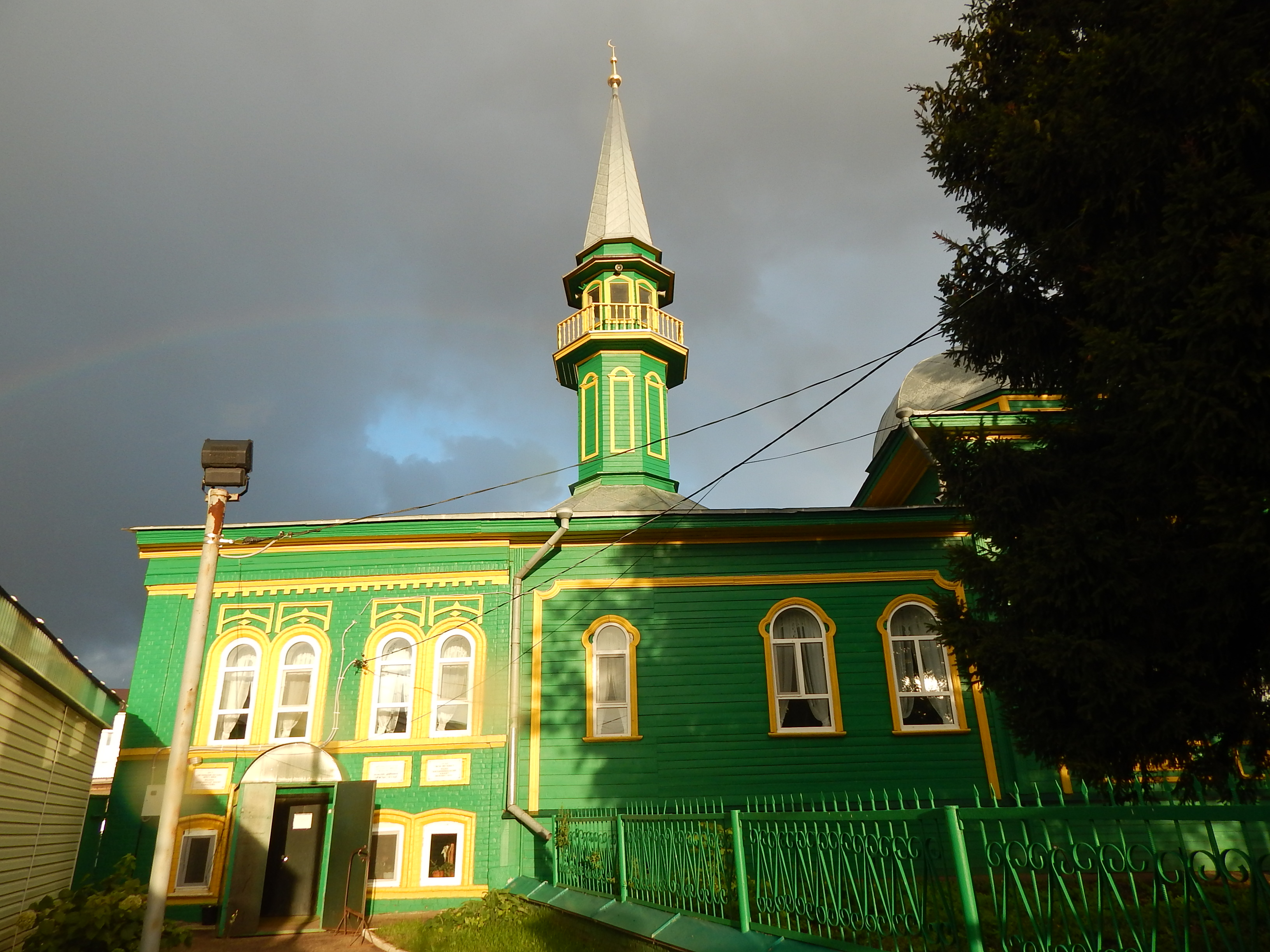
Мечеть в Чистополе

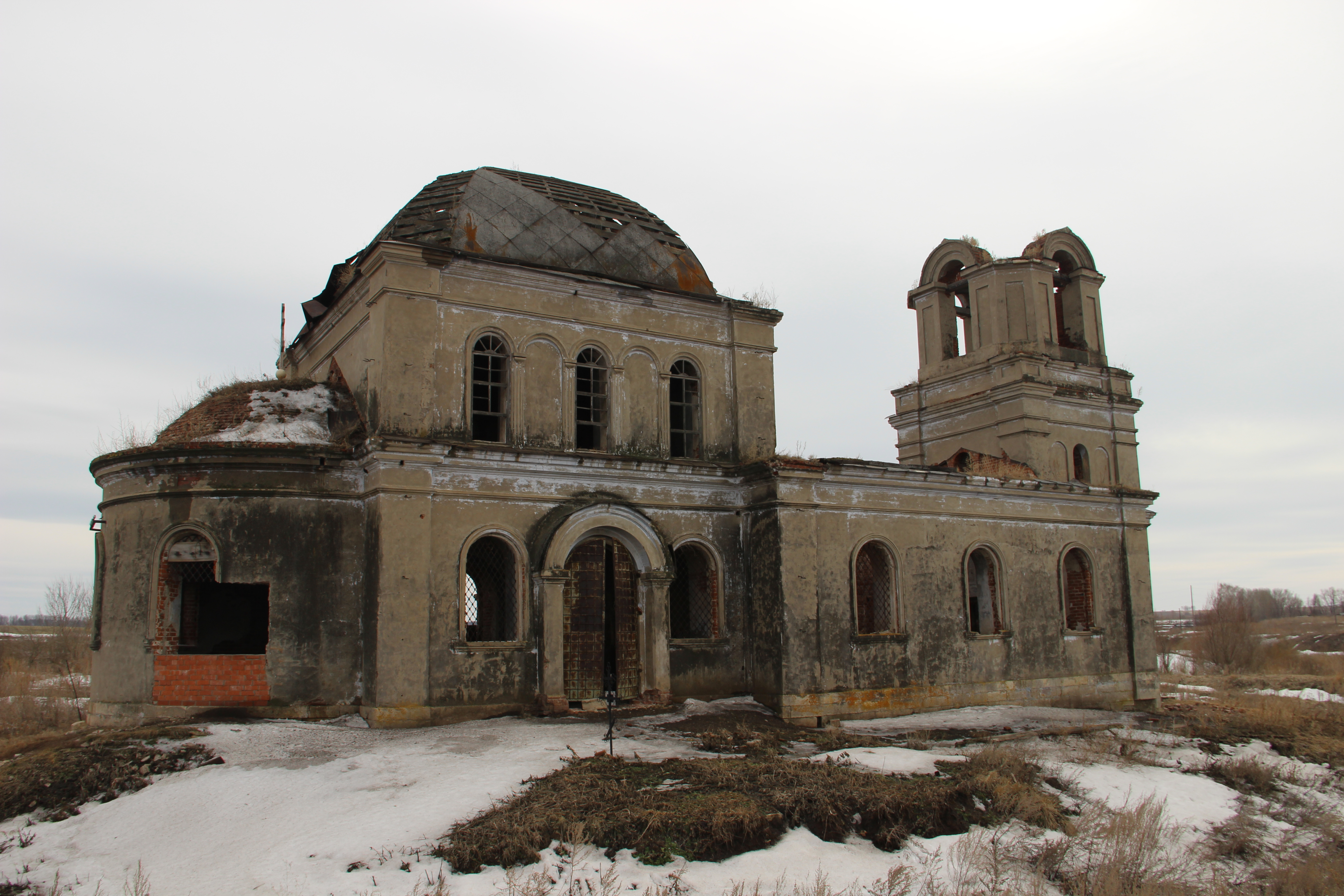
Церковь в Русских Сарсазах

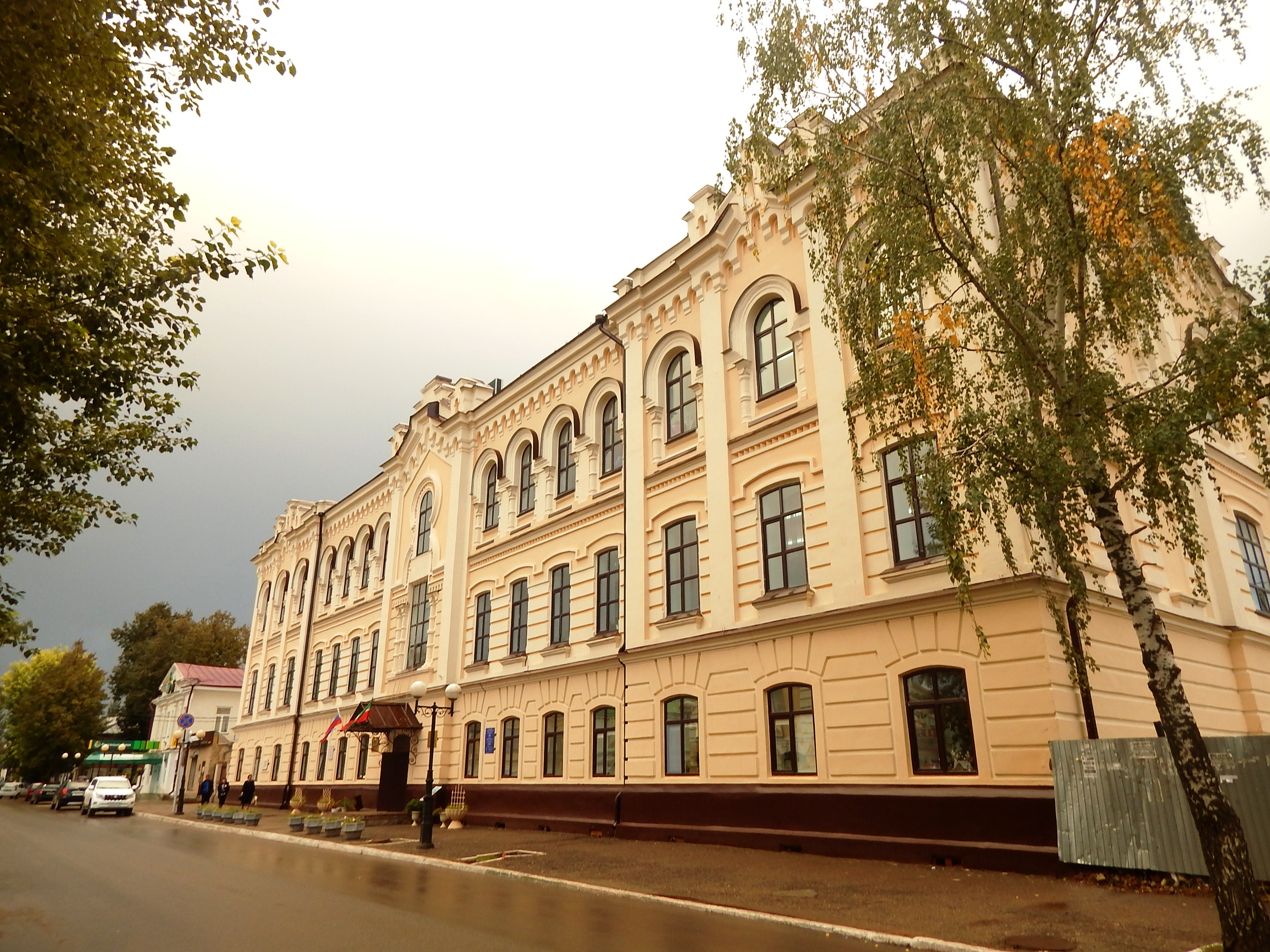
Здание чистопольского духовного училища
