= Ushkuyniks =

Medieval Novgorodian pirates

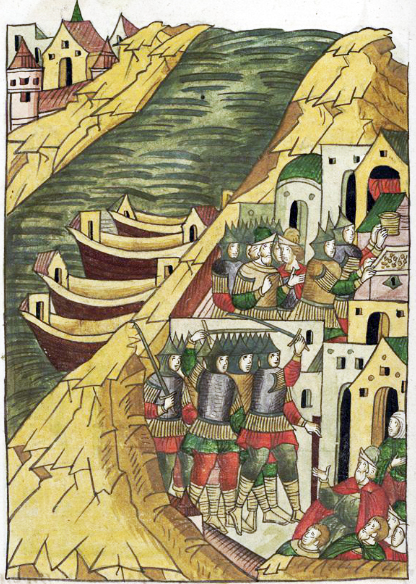
Novgorodian ushkuyniks capturing Kostroma, miniature from the Illustrated Chronicle of Ivan the Terrible (16th century)

The ushkuyniks (Russian: ушкуйники, romanized: ushkuyniki, sing. ушкуйник, ushkuynik), also spelled ushkuiniks, were medieval Novgorodian pirates who operated in the north of European Russia as well as along the Volga River until the 15th century.

== Etymology ==
The word ushkuynik is derived from ushkuy (Russian: ушкуй), a type of small, shallow-draught Russian ship. These ships could be easily transported over portages between watersheds.

The word ushkuy likely derives either from Oskuya river, or from Old Veps *uškoi̯ (small boat).

== History ==
The north of European Russia was mostly colonized by the Novgorodians from the 14th to 15th centuries, with the ushkuyniks possibly leading the way from the 12th to 14th centuries; northern Russian traditions linked the appearance of brigand hideouts on mountainous terrain or the mouths of rivers with the ushkuyniks, and dens organized by the ushkuyniks for raids have been hypothesized by scholars as having been associated with early Novgorodian occupation methods. The Novgorodians raided beyond the basin of the Northern Dvina from the 11th century.

Many ushkuyniks wore mail hauberks, though it was more common for them to wear hybrid assemblages of armor acquired through purchase or looting; mail and plate bechterets was also commonly worn and this would become typical in late medieval and early modern Russia. The weaponry of the ushkuyniks was also influenced by the Tatars, with short-range weapons including spears, swords, and especially sabres, while bows and crossbows were used as long-range weapons. Better equipment and funds for expeditions were given by boyars or Novgorodian merchants.

The ushkuyniks first appear in the historical record as an organized force in the 1320s. Arranged in squadrons which could number several thousand, Ushkuyniks enjoyed the patronage of influential boyar families of Novgorod, who used them to demonstrate Novgorod's military clout to its neighbours and to advance its trade interests and influence along the Volga river.

During the 1360s and 1370s, Novgorodian merchants sent out expeditions of the ushkuyniks to raid settlements along the Middle Volga, with the partial aim of protecting against incursions by rivals on their guild's monopoly on the northern hinterland and also to force the settlements to give the merchants legal trading rights. During the campaign of 1360, the ushkuyniks sailed from Novgorod by the portages to the Volga river. Under command of the boyar Anfal Nikitin, they gained possession of Zhukotin, a trade emporium in Volga Bulgaria. A ruler of the Golden Horde, which controlled Zhukotin, was furious and ordered Grand Prince Dmitry Konstantinovich to capture the ushkuyniks and to bring them to the Horde for trial, but Dmitry's punitive expedition failed.

In 1363, the ushkuyniks launched the first Novgorodian raid along the Ob River in western Siberia. At the same time, the chronicles describe Karelo-Novgoridian raids on Norwegian border provinces.

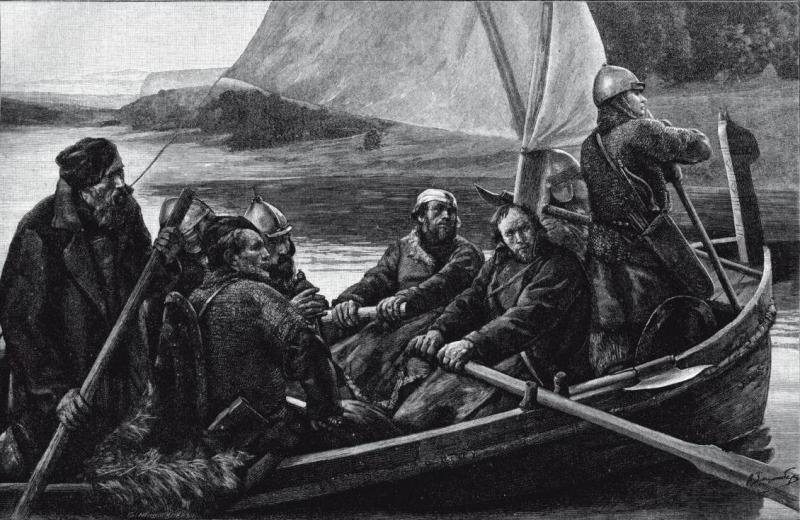
Painting of ushkuyniks by Savely Zeydenberg (19th century)

Three years later, without consulting their superiors in Novgorod, they approached Nizhny Novgorod and, wishing to punish Dmitry for his hostile action, massacred Armenian and Tatar merchants trading there. This led to a diplomatic row, when Dmitry demanded apologies from Novgorod Republic.

In 1371, the ushkuyniks sacked Yaroslavl, Kostroma and other Upper Volga cities. Three years later they sailed with upwards of ninety ships to pillage the Vyatka region. In 1375, they defeated the militia of Kostroma and burnt the city to the ground. The destruction was so severe that Kostroma had to be rebuilt elsewhere. After that, they looted Nizhny Novgorod and sailed down the Volga to Astrakhan, where they were annihilated by a Tatar general.

By 1391, the ushkuyniks had recovered from this reverse and felt strong enough to resume their activities. In this period Patrikas, the overlord of the Korela district, was their patron. In 1391 the pirates sacked both Zhukotin and Kazan. With Muscovy's power on the ascendant, the Novgorod Republic was pressed into putting down their filibustering activities in the first decades of the 15th century. After Novgorod was annexed by Moscow in the 1470s, Moscow acquired the legacy of the Novgorodian policy of commercial expansion to the northeast, while at the same time pursuing its policy of "gathering the Russian lands", leading to Russian eastward expansion intensifying in the following decades, especially following the conquests of the Astrakhan and Kazan khanates in the mid-16th century. Novgorodian pirates were succeeded by the soldiers and Cossack forces of Moscow.

== See also ==
- Novgorod Army

== Bibliography ==
- "Ушкуйники" . Brockhaus and Efron Encyclopedic Dictionary (in Russian). 1906.
