= Novgorod Army =

- Новгородское войско (Russian)
- Founded: 13th century
- Disbanded: 15th century
- Headquarters: Veliky Novgorod

Related articles
- History: Military history of Russia

The Novgorod Army (Russian: Новгородское войско) was the armed forces of Veliky Novgorod and the lands subordinated to the Novgorod Republic. Initially, the army of Novgorod belonged to Kievan Rus', but became separate as a result of feudal fragmentation and the formation of the Novgorod Republic.

== Structure ==
The Novgorod Army was divided into two main parts: the first consisted of Novgorodians, the second of foreigners called shestniki.

=== Residents of the Novgorod lands ===
==== Militia ====
Novgorod's narodnoe opolcheniye (militia) was assembled when necessary and disbanded after, and in some cases before, the conclusion of military operations. Nevertheless, it frequently participated in campaigns. For example, according to the Novgorod First Chronicle, in the 11th century, the Novgorodians participated in 5 campaigns, and the Novgorod prince in 6; in the 12th century, 38 campaigns involving Novgorodians and 29 involving the prince; in the 13th century, 52 and 35, respectively; in the 14th century, 43 and 11; During the first half of the 15th century, there were 13 and 3 respectively. Thus, according to the chronicle, the militia participated in campaigns more often than the princes, with an average frequency of two to three years. The decision to assemble the militia and set out on campaign was made at the veche (assembly), and its participants constituted the Novgorod militia. If necessary, the militia could be formed by all free residents of Novgorod, including clergy; with the exception of monks, women, and children. The most combat-ready and well-armed part of the militia were the ognishchane (officials, Novgorodian boyars), gridba (professional warriors), and merchants.

Since the participation of all Novgorodians in the militia was not required, then for recruiting the militia from each self-governing unit (street or village), either a representative (a certain number of people nominated) or proportional (a specified number of people from 10 households or sokhs) could be used, and the selection took place at the local government level. The mustering of the militia in Pskov was called razrub or porub, in Novgorod it was pokrut, and the militia's neighbors were required to supply them with everything they needed for the campaign — pokrut. Weapons and horses could also be provided by the city treasury or donated by wealthy citizens. Those who shied away from service were punished. Due to their lack of professionalism, a significant portion of the militia lacked combat effectiveness, which led to its frequent defeats in conflicts with the Grand Principality of Moscow. In addition to those recruited through the razrub, "eager people" could also volunteer to join the militia. In the 11th–12th centuries, the entire militia went on campaigns. In the 13th century, a stratification occurred, and, depending on the threat, either the "vyatshie people" (the most combat-ready) or all Novgorodians, including young people (poor townspeople) were mustered. or the entire Novgorod Land (the militias of Novgorod, Pskov, Ladoga, Rusa, and other suburbs and volosts). The size of the militia could be quite significant—in 1215, more than 2,000 Novgorodians were mentioned. In the 12th–14th centuries, the militia of the entire Novgorod Land usually numbered 5,000–10,000 men.

==== Professional warriors ====
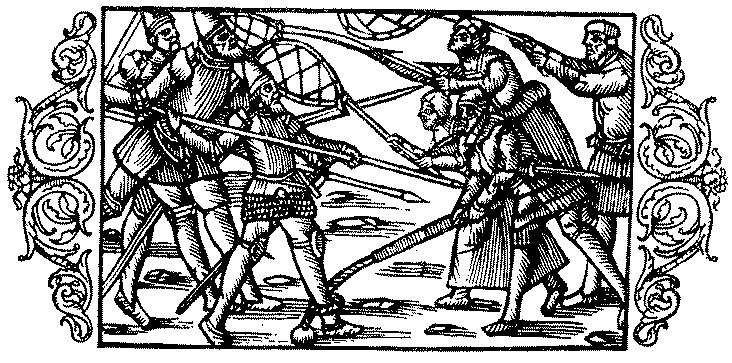
Attack of the ushkuiniki on the Swedes, 16th-century engraving

The professional militia consisted of warriors who regularly went on campaigns and viewed military affairs as a source of income. The first mention of them dates back to 1014, where a payment of 1,000 grivnas to the Novgorodian gridi is mentioned. The gridi referred to both Novgorod professional warriors and those hired from other lands. In 1169, a Novgorodian squad of 400 men was mentioned as collecting tribute. The warriors who served in the tribute-collecting detachments were called kmeti or otroki and were professional Novgorod warriors; such a detachment was led by a Novgorod boyar.

Another type of professional were bailiffs. Although this position was initially occupied by princely nobles, over time, Novgorod's own bailiffs also emerged. In the 15th-century Novgorod Judicial Charter, they are referred to as "sofyans" and could form the personal guard of the Diocese of Novgorod, and in certain military operations, they played a leadership role, where they were called vladychnye lyudi. Thus, professional warriors of both types constituted the armed retinue of Novgorod nobles and the church authorities. At the same time, there were also professional warriors who served Novgorod directly. These included the garrisons of fortified points in Novgorod Land — zasudas. These garrisons were constantly supplied with provisions, usually from the local population. A separate category were the Novgorodian molodtsy, some of whom were also known as ushkuyniki. They were not part of the militia, but rather organized themselves and carried out military or plundering expeditions. In some cases, they participated in wars without permission, causing damage to the enemy.

Volunteer detachments led by Novgorod voivodes, who carried out military campaigns, were also considered "good fellows." In the 14th and 15th centuries, due to a number of factors, one of which was the development of trade and industry, military service became increasingly unprofitable. Novgorodians gradually lost their military skills, and the combat effectiveness of most of the Novgorod army declined.

=== Shestniki ===
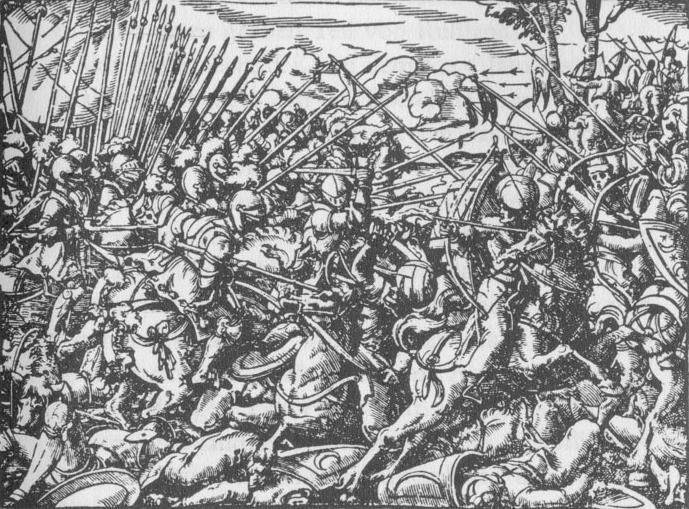
The battle between Novgorod and Moscow troops in 1477, engraving from the second half of the 16th century

Shestniki could also be temporarily invited allied armies, but this was rare. In contrast, the Novgorod army almost always included detachments of shestniki, led by the prince. Novgorodians could personally invite and expel princes, which they did quite frequently—for example, from 1095 to 1304, princes in Novgorod changed 58 times. Their military detachments represented, first and foremost, the prince's court. The main duty of the prince's nobles was to participate in military operations. They received funds either directly from the prince or for temporarily serving as bailiffs and other officials. For their military activities, the prince and his court received a share of the duties. The prince and his noblemen regularly went on campaigns, personally organizing the supplies of his army. These shestniki were, in the overwhelming majority of cases, Orthodox Russians from other principalities; non-Russians converted to Orthodoxy—like Prince Dovmont, who fled to Pskov from Lithuania in 1265 with 300 men—warriors and relatives. The prince's personal army, which was constantly present with him in Novgorod, was relatively small—for example, in 1471, the Polish king and the Lithuanian prince Casimir were assigned a force of 50 men at Gorodishche.

The number of princely gridni in the 12th-13th centuries is very roughly estimated at no more than 80 men. This estimate is based on the mention of 200 grivnas in a source, probably from the 13th century, supposedly paid by Novgorodians to the prince and his nobles, and a reference to a salary of 2.5 grivnas for gridni in birch bark document No. 788 from the 12th century. The First Pskov Chronicle reports on the very large retinue of Prince Alexander Vasilyevich Czartoryski, who set out from Pskov for Lithuania in 1456: "And his household's forged army of fighting men numbered 300 men, oprichnina." In the 14th century, the princes' political and military functions were separated, and service princes began to be hired to perform military duties, to whom the Novgorodians allocated specific volosts for their subsistence. If necessary, these princes led not only their own court but also the militia of these volosts.

== Organization ==
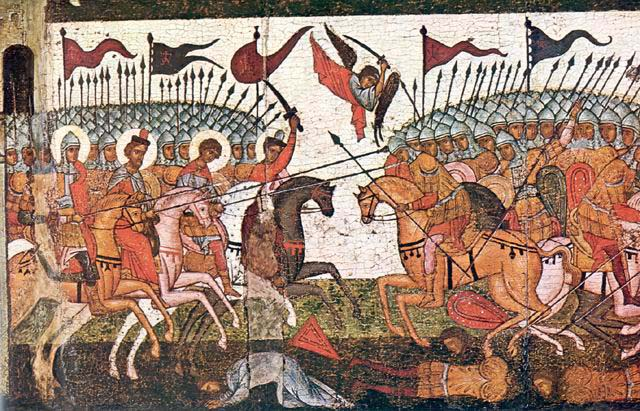
Battle of Novgorod and Suzdal in 1170, a fragment of an icon from the mid- to late 15th century

In 1208, together with Prince Konstantin Vsevolodovich, the army of Novgorod marched to assist the prince against the princes of Ryazan.

The Novgorodian troops were led by voivodes from among the Novgorod boyars, one or more, depending on the specific situation. For example, in 1411, during the campaign against the Tiversky fort captured by the Swedes, there were 13 voivodes over the Novgorodian regiments. The commanders-in-chief were elected at the veche. The highest position was held by the posadnik (mayor), followed by the tysyatsky (chiliarch). They were appointed by the veche and could be removed; for example, in 1134, the veche assembled directly during the campaign removed the posadnik. A special position was occupied by an invited prince, who acted as a military expert. It was not uncommon for the prince to lead the campaign of the Novgorod troops. The prince and mayor, however, did not participate in all campaigns; the tysyatsky could hold the position of head of the militia or, less commonly, serve as one of the voivodes. Novgorodians generally went on campaign as a single regiment. In some cases, however, the army was divided into several regiments. The organizational structure included divisions into thousands and hundreds.

There is no precise information about the structure of the army of Novgorod before the 13th century. In all likelihood, the prince was its commander-in-chief. His personal court, or druzhina, reported directly to him. The bulk of the army consisted of the Novgorod militia, which made decisions on participation in military conflicts at the veche and could act independently, without the prince.

In the 13th–15th centuries, the core of the army of Novgorod consisted of the professional militia, mounted and well-armed. They were joined by semi-professional warriors with horses, weapons, and combat experience. All of them were divided into hundreds; each hundred made up a thousand, led by a tysyatsky (commander). If necessary, this militia was joined by militias from the suburbs, led by voivodes—suburban posadniki. The combined army was led by the Novgorod posadnik. In times of extreme danger, it was necessary to call upon "foot soldiers", poorly armed young men, to serve. They were also led by the posadnik. Permanent garrisons, detachments of "lads," and, in some cases, suburban militias that did not join the general campaign generally acted independently, but obeyed the orders of the posadnik and the prince, who also often appointed voivodes there.

In 1471, the 40,000-strong army of Novgorod was utterly defeated on the banks of the Shelon River by the army led by the governor Daniil Kholmsky; about 12,000 Novgorodians died and 2,000 were taken prisoner, according to the Moscow chronicle compilation.

== Supplies ==
In peacetime, the rural population was the source of food. During campaigns, provisions were taken with them, but also obtained, for example, in enemy territory. There are many known cases where a lack of provisions led to the failure of an operation. The army usually moved on horseback; when foot soldiers participated in the campaign, they walked on foot for short distances, and for longer ones, they traveled along rivers in boats, nasads, and ushkuis. Most Novgorodian horses were inexpensive, Karelian or Livonian; noble Novgorodians could use expensive knightly steeds.

== Tactics ==
The entire army of Novgorod marched as a single regiment, which, when formed into battle formations, was divided into several detachments, also called regiments. The center of each regiment was a banner, next to which stood the commander. In a number of battles in the 13th century and earlier, the Novgorodian army, which used horses for movement, dismounted for battle. In this case, regiments may have sometimes formed a battle formation, for example, in a rectangular column. In field battles, the Novgorodians preferred to attack with all their forces in a single decisive charge. Sometimes they would make a flanking maneuver. The Novgorodians also sometimes attempted to attack the enemy camp, for example, at night. In the 14th and 15th centuries, the role of cavalry in Novgorod increased significantly, and only the professional portion of the militia began to participate in most campaigns. As a result, all "Vyatshie" Novgorodians began to fight on horseback; the small professional infantry portion of the army consisted of the "ship's army", composed of "lads". However, it was the "lads" who became the main participants in the fighting. In the second half of the 15th century, the non-professional portion of the militia also became mounted. However, this cavalry retained the old tactics.

== Armament ==
Initially, the offensive and defensive armament of the Novgorodians differed very little from the general Russian context. The primary weapons were axes, as well as spears and javelins. Swords, due to their high cost, were rarer. From the 11th to 13th centuries, sabres became widespread in northern Rus', although to a limited extent. Sabres never achieved widespread popularity in the northwestern Russian lands, where the sword remained the primary bladed weapon until the 15th century. The swords used were of Central European types. Unlike sabres, flails and maces were quite common in the Novgorod Land. Bows and crossbows were also used as throwing weapons.

Defensive armament included chainmail and plate armor. Plate armor included lamellar armor, used from the 9th–10th centuries until the end of the 15th century, as well as brigandines and scale armor, which appeared in the 13th century. Plate armor significantly supplanted chainmail in the Novgorod Lands: according to archaeological data, the ratio of chainmail fragments to plate armor pieces in layers from the mid- and second half of the 13th century was 1 to 3, and in layers from the 14th and 15th centuries, it was 1 to 9. Shields were also an important defensive weapon.

From the 13th century onward, Novgorodians made considerable use of projectile weapons. The oldest report of the use of firearms in the Novgorod Lands dates back to 1394; this report also marks the first mention of siege artillery in Rus'. The presence of fortress artillery in Yamgorod was first recorded in 1444, and in Novgorod in 1471. The use of naval cannons by the Novgorodians is mentioned as early as the Abrahamka Chronicle for 1447, during a battle on the Narva River with the Livonians. And in 1459, at Norov, the Germans captured the Pskov nasadata with "cannons and all military supplies".
