= Cükätaw =

Medieval city near Chistopol, Tatarstan, Russia

Cükätaw (pronounced [ʑykæˈtɑʊ]; Chuvash: Çÿхету, romanized: Cühetu; Tatar: Җүкәтау, romanized: Juketau; Russian: Джукетау), also known as Zhukotin (Russian: Жукотин), was a medieval Bolgar city during the 10th to 15th centuries CE. The city was situated on the right bank of the Kama, near the modern city of Chistopol.

In the 10th to 13th centuries it was one of the most important centres of the fur trade in Volga Bulgaria. The city was the capital of the Cükätaw Duchy. In 1236 Cükätaw was destroyed by Batu Khan's troops during the Mongol invasion of Volga Bulgaria. Following the Russian pirate raids in the 14th and 15th centuries, the city's power declined. After the town was sacked by Yuri of Zvenigorod in 1414, it was abandoned. The ruins are situated near the modern village of Danaurovka.

== Etymology ==
The name of the ancient Bulgarian city of Dzhuketau (Җүкәтау ) comes from two Tatar words: "yuka" — linden, "tau" — mountain. Thus, from the Tatar language, Dzhuketau translates as "Lime Mountain".

The second version is that the name is derived from the Tatar words: "yuke" — steep (big, high) and "tau" — mountain, which translates as "Steep Mountain".
