= Tatars (Mongols) =

Historical exonym for Mongol peoples

Forty tümen Mongols
- 1388–1635
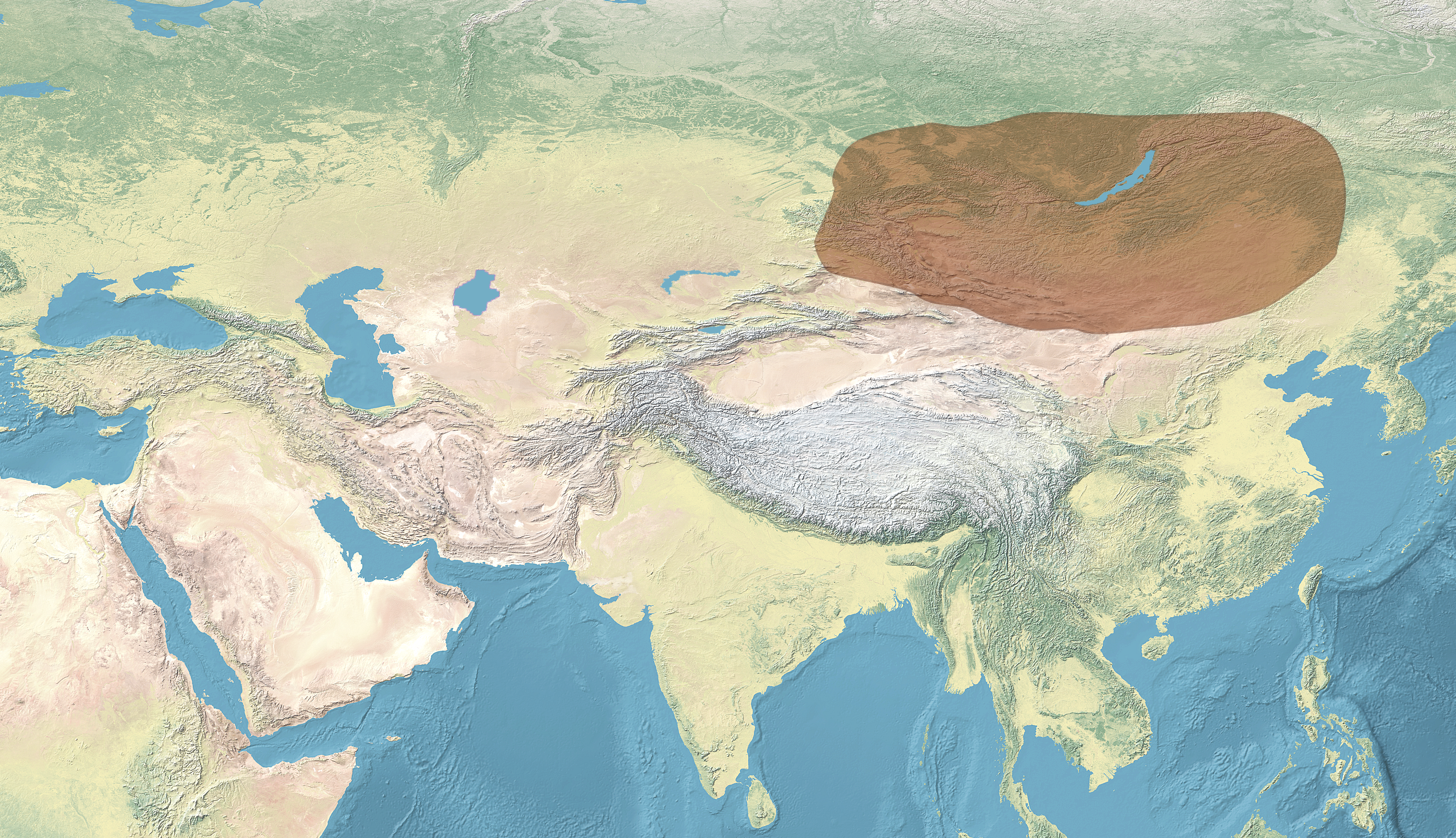
- Tribes of the Mongolian Plateau during the Ming dynasty in the 15th century
- Capital: 1. Karakorum (16th century); 2. Chaganhaote (1617–1634)
- Common languages: Mongolian (Classical Mongolian)
- Religion: Shamanism, Tibetan Buddhism
- Government: Monarchy
- Khagan
  - 1388–1391: Jorightu Khan Yesüder (first)
  - 1634–1635: Ejei Khan (last)
- Historical era: Late Middle Ages
  - Yesüder killed Tögüs Temür, Tianyuan Emperor of Yuan, abolished the dynastic name Great Yuan, and proclaimed himself Khan: 1388
  - Ejei surrendered to the Later Jin; the Great Mongol State officially perished: 12 June 1635
Preceded by	Succeeded by
Northern Yuan	Later Jīn; Outer Khalkha

Tatars (simplified Chinese: 鞑靼; traditional Chinese: 韃靼; pinyin: Dádá; 1388 – 12 June 1635) was a general term used by the Han Chinese to refer to the nomadic peoples in the north. During the Ming dynasty, it specifically referred to the Eastern Mongols. In the early 15th century, the Mongol tribes were divided into two major groups: the Eastern and the Western. The eastern part of the Mongolian grasslands was composed of tribes that were originally ruled by the Northern Yuan court. They were nomadic and inhabited both the northern and southern regions of the Gobi Desert. The Ming dynasty referred to them as "Tatars." The western part was inhabited by the Oirats, located in the northwest of the Mongolian Plateau. The "Tatars" were ruled by the descendants of Kublai Khan, or by other Mongol branches who were not direct descendants but still considered part of the Chinggisids. Their ancestors were the Black Tatars mentioned in the New History of Yuan. The Mongols who were referred to as "Tatars" by the Ming called themselves The Forty [tümen] Mongols (Mongolian: Дөчин Монгол; Mongolian script: ᠳᠥᠴᠢᠨ
ᠮᠣᠩᠭᠤᠯ; Döchin Mongol), and are also known as the Mongol proper in modern times.

During that period, Eastern Mongolia was divided into various independent tribes. After Dayan Khan unified the Eastern Mongols, they were divided into six Tümens, and the name Six Tümens (Mongolian: Зургаан түмэн; Zurgaan tümen) was used in Mongolian thereafter until Inner Mongolia was conquered by the Later Jin. Later, it was further divided into the left and right wings. The left wing consisted of the Chahars, Khalkha, Uriankhai, and Khorchin tribes, while the right wing included the Yunshebuu, Ordos, Tumed, and Asud tribes.
