= Bilar =

Bilar can refer to:

- Bilar, Bohol, a municipality in the province of Bohol, Philippines
- Bilär or Bilyarsk, a medieval city and second capital of Volga Bulgaria
- Bilär or Bilyarsk, a village in the Republic of Tatarstan, Russia
- Bilars, a medieval Turkic tribe, founders of Bilär
- Elvillar/Bilar, a town and municipality in Basque Country, Spain
- Punta Bilar, northernmost point of Mindanao Island, Surigao City, Philippines
- Bilar, Swedish title of Cars (film)
