= Kama Bridge =

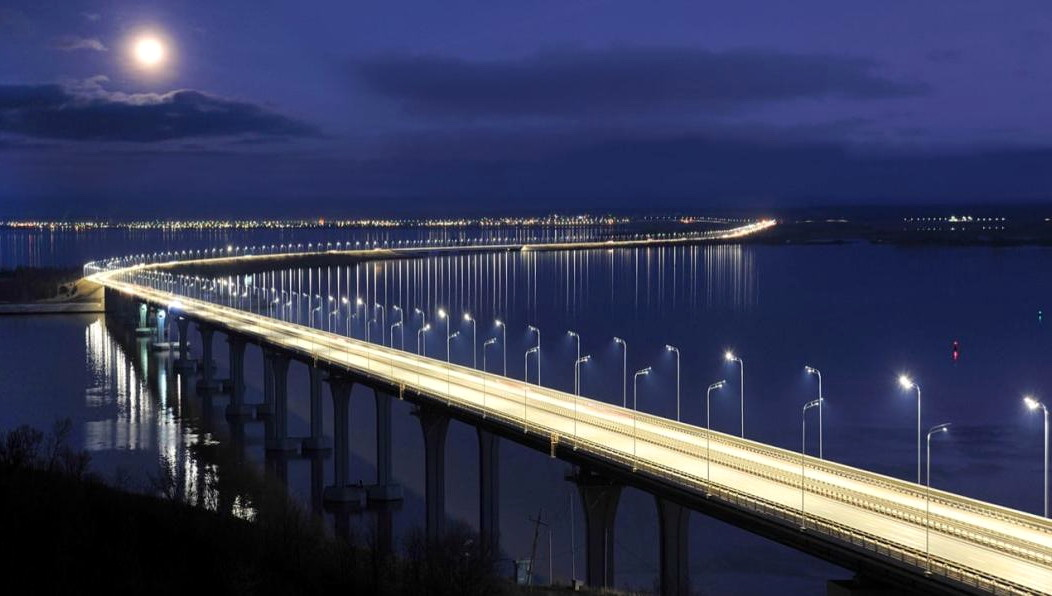
- Coordinates: 55°20′58″N 50°00′29″E
- Crosses: Kama River
- Locale: Soroch'i Gory, Tatarstan, Russia

Characteristics
- Design: Beam bridge
- Total length: 1,608 m (13,967 m with adjacent bridges and elevated highways)
- Width: m

History
- Opened: 18 October 2002

Location
- Interactive map of Kama Bridge

The Kama Bridge (Russian: Мост через Каму), is a bridge on the highway R239 between Soroch'i Gory and Alekseevskoye settlements in Tatarstan, Russia. It is a part of the longest artificial road structure in Russia if measured by the total length of elevated roadway. The structure with a total length of 13,967 m incorporates three bridges: over the Kama River (1,608 m), over the Arkharovka River (549.9 m) and over the Kurlyanka River (69.8 m). The rest is elevated embankment, not bridges.

The construction of the bridge structure began in 1992 and was completed on 18 October 2002, when it was officially opened by the President of Tatarstan, Mintimer Shaimiev. The bridge is very important one, since it is a part of a major Kazan - Chistopol - Bugulma - Orenburg highway. The second stage of the structure is planned to be built at a later date.
