= Yerykla =

Yerykla may refer to:

- Yerykla, Alexeyevsky District, Republic of Tatarstan, a village (selo) in the Alexeyevsky District of the Republic of Tatarstan, Russia
- Yerykla, Nurlatsky District, Republic of Tatarstan, a village (selo) in the Nurlatsky District of the Republic of Tatarstan, Russia
