= Bilars =

The Bilars were a medieval (10th-13th centuries) Turkic tribal commonwealth in the Middle Volga. The Bilars are known to have founded the city of Bilär. Since the 10th century they were a part of Volga Bulgaria. In the 11th-14th centuries their land (today's Alexeyevsky District of Tatarstan) was one of Bulgaria's emirates or duchies.

== See also ==
弊剌 Bìlà (< MC (ZS): /biᴇi^{H}-lɑt̚/), a Turkic tribe identified by Chinese historiographers with either Alats or Basmyls.
