= Nadezhda Kuzhelnaya =

- Надежда Кужельная
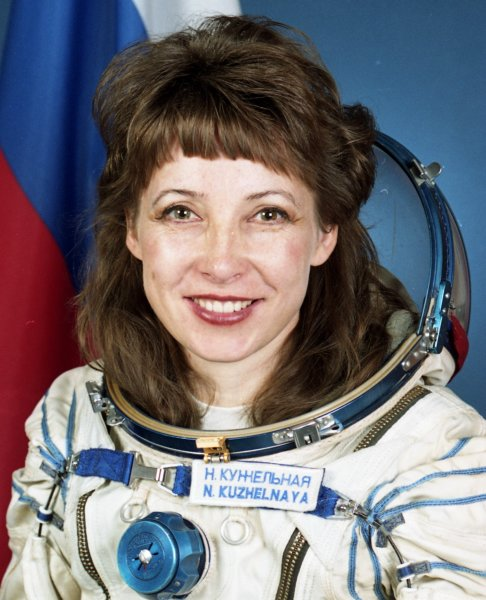
- Born: Nadezhda Vasilyevna Kuzhelnaya; 6 November 1962 (age 63); Alexeyevskoye, Republic of Tatarstan, Russia
- Education: Dnepropetrovsk Engineering and Building Institute
- Space career

Flight engineer
- Current occupation: Commercial pilot
- Previous occupation: Cosmonaut
- Status: Retired
- Retired: 2004

Nadezhda Vasilyevna Kuzhelnaya (Russian: Надежда Васильевна Кужельная, born 6 November 1962) is a former Russian cosmonaut. She had been due to fly on Soyuz TM-32, but was cut in order to accommodate American space tourist Dennis Tito. She later retired from the service in 2004, to become a commercial pilot with Russian carrier Aeroflot.

== Early life ==
Nadezhda Vasilievna Kuzhelnaya was born on 6 November 1962 in Alexeyevskoye, Republic of Tatarstan, Russia. As a child, she enjoyed science fiction films and books on space. As a hobby, she joined a flying club in 1981. She aspired to become an architect, and graduated from the Dnepropetrovsk Engineering and Building Institute in 1984. However, inspired by Svetlana Savitskaya's flight into space on the Soyuz T-7 mission, she instead enrolled in the Moscow Aviation Institute. Upon graduation in 1988, she began working as an engineer for RKK Energia, designing equipment for spaceflights.

== Career ==
Kuzhelnaya applied 1994 to become a cosmonaut and was accepted onto the two-year training programme, and studied at the Yuri Gagarin Cosmonaut Training Center. She was one of two civilians recruited, alongside Mikhail Tyurin, who had also worked for RKK Energia. During the training, Kuzhelnaya married her flight instructor, Vladimir Morozov. When the couple had a daughter, Kuzhelnaya postponed her training for a while but returned quickly while Morozov looked after their child. Kuzhelnaya trained as a flight engineer, whose role would be to fly the Soyuz spacecraft to dock with the International Space Station.

She was assigned to Soyuz TM-32, due to fly to the space station in 2001. However, she was cut in order to accommodate American space tourist Dennis Tito. Kuzhelnaya was subsequently allocated as a backup to French astronaut Claudie Haigneré for a mission later that year. Between 1999 and 2004, Kuzhelnaya was the sole female cosmonaut. She was a backup once again in 2001, for Italian astronaut Roberto Vittori during the Soyuz TM-34 mission. In May 2004, after an announcement that female cosmonauts would not be flying for several years, she retired from the service to become a commercial pilot for Russian carrier Aeroflot. As of 2007, Kuzhelnaya was one of two female pilots who flew the Tupolev Tu-134, compared to around a thousand male pilots, then Airbus A320 and Airbus A330.
