= Kubáňovo =

Village and municipality in Slovakia

Kubáňovo Szete
- Municipality
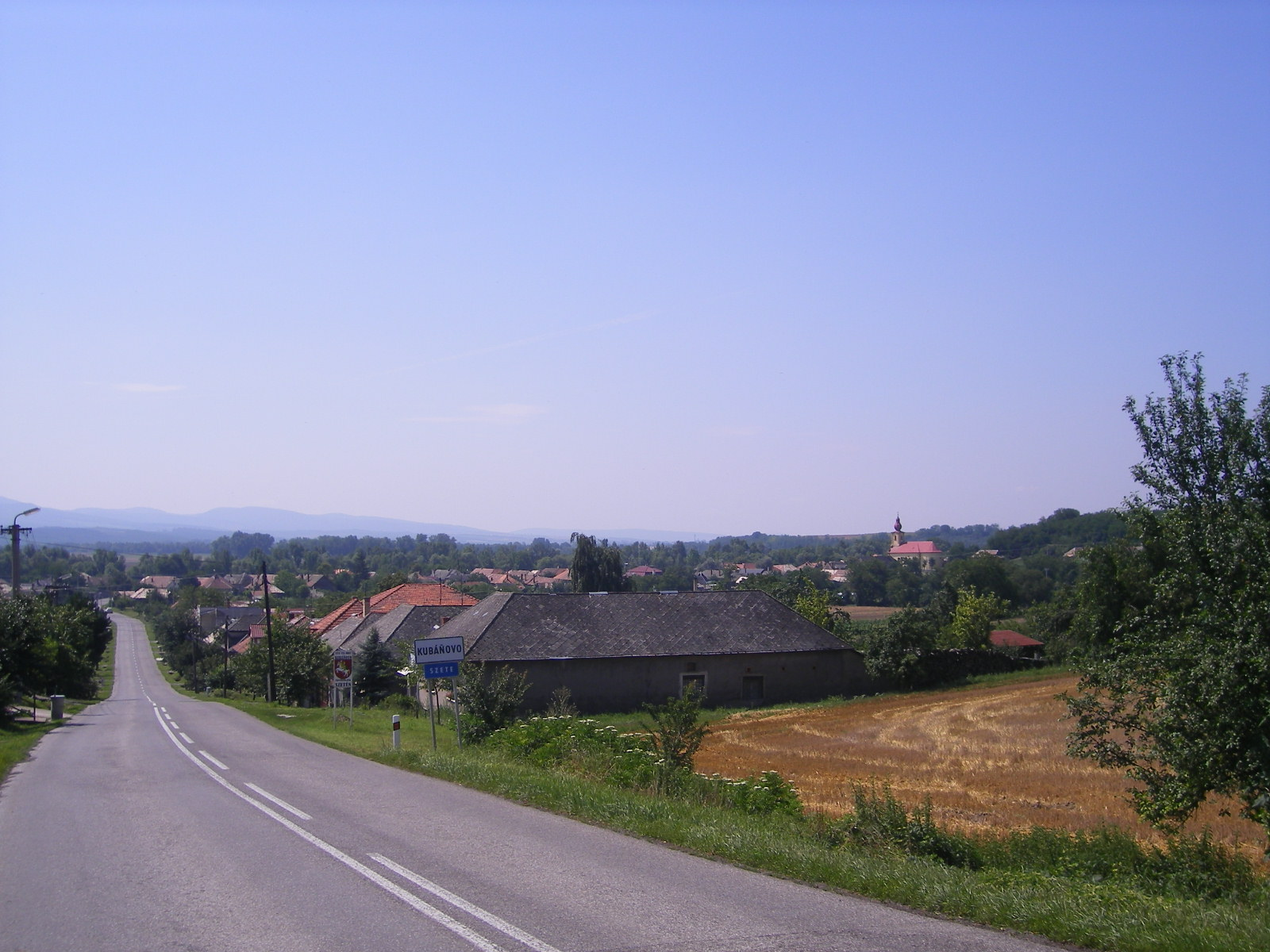

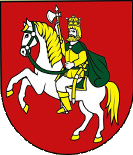
- Flag Coat of arms

- Location of Kubáňovo in the Nitra Region Location of Kubáňovo in Slovakia
- Coordinates: 48.07°N 18.82°E
- Country: Slovakia
- Region: Nitra Region
- District: Levice District
- First mentioned: 1236

Area
  - Total: 12.05 km^{2} (4.65 sq mi)
- Elevation: 124 m (407 ft)

Population (2025)
  - Total: 254
- Time zone: UTC+1 (CET)
  - Summer (DST): UTC+2 (CEST)
- Postal code: 935 75
- Area code: +421 36
- Vehicle registration plate (until 2022): LV
- Website: www.kubanovo.sk

Kubáňovo (Hungarian: Szete) is a village and municipality in the Levice District in the Nitra Region of Slovakia.

== History ==
In historical records the village was first mentioned in 1236.

== Geography ==
The municipality lies at an altitude of 124 metres (407 ft) and covers an area of 12.05 km^{2} (4.65 sq mi) (2025).

== Population ==
Population statistic (10 years)
Year	1995	2005	2015	2025
Count	332	289	282	254
Difference		−12.95%	−2.42%	−9.92%

Population statistic
Year	2024	2025
Count	251	254
Difference		+1.19%

It has a population of 254 people (31 December 2025).

=== Ethnicity ===
Census 2021 (1+ %)
Ethnicity	Number	Fraction
Hungarian	182	71.09%
Slovak	68	26.56%
Not found out	11	4.29%
Romani	4	1.56%
Polish	3	1.17%
Total	256	

In year 2021 was 256 people by ethnicity 182 as Hungarian, 68 as Slovak, 11 as Not found out, 4 as Romani, 3 as Polish, 2 as Other and 1 as Czech.

Note on population: The difference values of population numbers in the table "Population statistic" and in the sections "Ethnicity" & "Religion" is caused by the use of various statistical methods.

=== Religion ===
Census 2021 (1+ %)
Religion	Number	Fraction
Roman Catholic Church	211	82.42%
None	33	12.89%
Not found out	8	3.13%
Total	256	

In year 2021 was 256 people by religion 211 from Roman Catholic Church, 33 from None, 8 from Not found out, 2 from Calvinist Church, 1 from Islam and 1 from Evangelical Church.

== Facilities ==
The village has a public library.
