= Bilär, Alexeyevsky District =

Bilär Биләр Bilyarsk
- selo
- Location within Tatarstan
- Country: Russia
- Region: Tatarstan
- District: Äläski District

Population (2010)
  - Total: 2,204
- Time zone: UTC+3:00

Bilär (Tatar: Биләр, romanized: Bilär) or Bilyarsk (Russian: Билярск, romanized: Bilyarsk) is a rural locality (a selo) in Äläski District, Tatarstan. The population was 2204 as of 2010. Bilär, Alexeyevsky District is located 50 km from Älӓski, district's administrative centre, and 141 km from Kazan, the republic's capital, by road. The village was established in 17th century on or near the place of the eponymous city. There are 32 streets in the village.

In 1930–1963, Bilyarsk was an administrative center of Bilyar District. As of 2000, it had a population of 2,270.
