= 1236 =

1236 in various calendars
- Gregorian calendar: 1236; MCCXXXVI
- Ab urbe condita: 1989
- Armenian calendar: 685; ԹՎ ՈՁԵ
- Assyrian calendar: 5986
- Balinese saka calendar: 1157–1158
- Bengali calendar: 642–643
- Berber calendar: 2186
- English Regnal year: 20 Hen. 3 – 21 Hen. 3
- Buddhist calendar: 1780
- Burmese calendar: 598
- Byzantine calendar: 6744–6745
- Chinese calendar: 乙未年 (Wood Goat); 3933 or 3726 — to — 丙申年 (Fire Monkey); 3934 or 3727
- Coptic calendar: 952–953
- Discordian calendar: 2402
- Ethiopian calendar: 1228–1229
- Hebrew calendar: 4996–4997
- Hindu calendars
- Vikram Samvat: 1292–1293
- Shaka Samvat: 1157–1158
- Kali Yuga: 4336–4337
- Holocene calendar: 11236
- Igbo calendar: 236–237
- Iranian calendar: 614–615
- Islamic calendar: 633–634
- Japanese calendar: Katei 2 (嘉禎２年)
- Javanese calendar: 1145–1146
- Julian calendar: 1236; MCCXXXVI
- Korean calendar: 3569
- Minguo calendar: 676 before ROC 民前676年
- Nanakshahi calendar: −232
- Thai solar calendar: 1778–1779
- Tibetan calendar: ཤིང་མོ་ལུག་ལོ་ (female Wood-Sheep); 1362 or 981 or 209 — to — མེ་ཕོ་སྤྲེ་ལོ་ (male Fire-Monkey); 1363 or 982 or 210

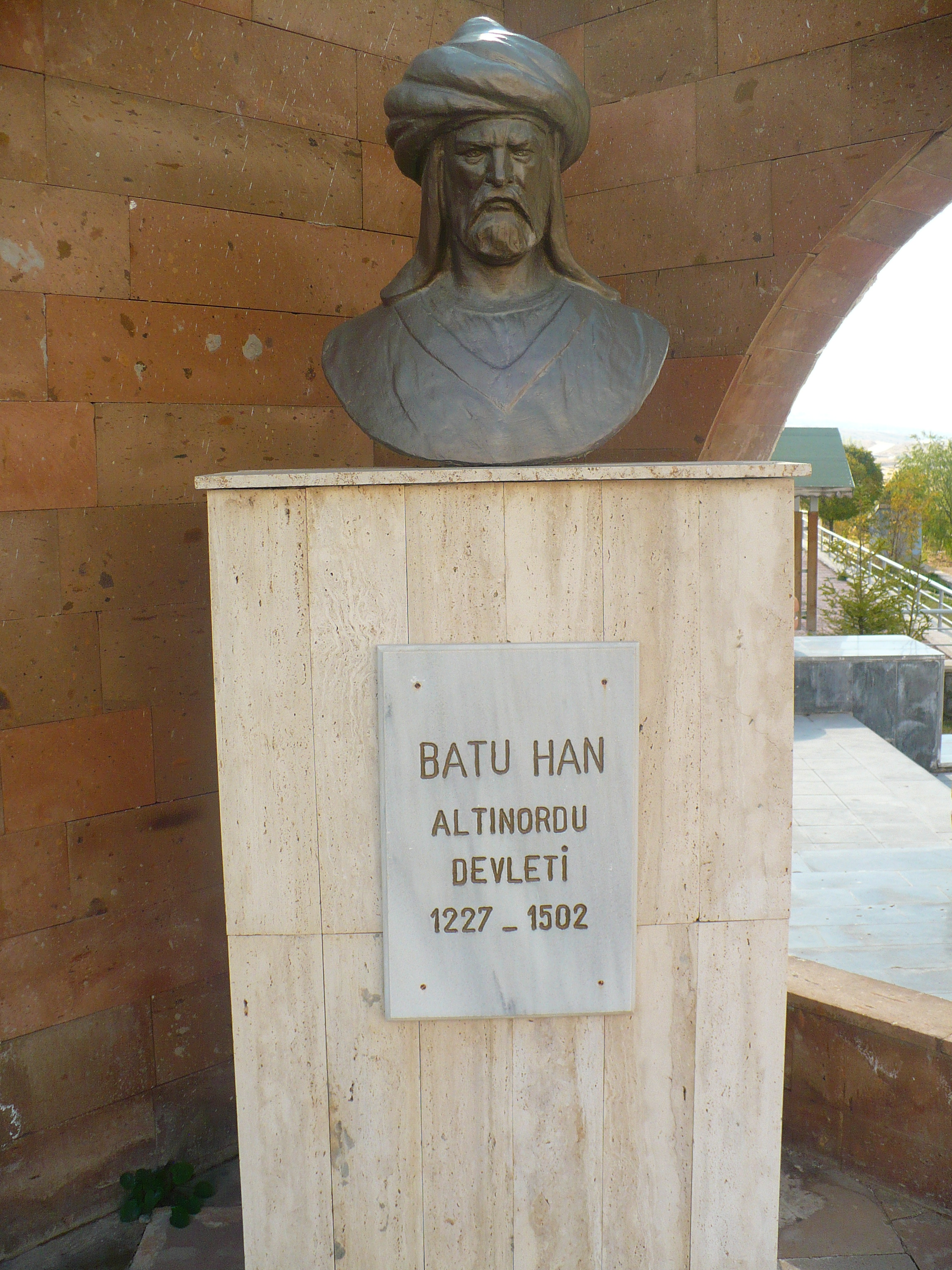
Batu Khan (c. 1205–1255) at Kayseri

Year 1236 (MCCXXXVI) was a leap year starting on Tuesday of the Julian calendar.

== Events ==
=== By place ===
==== Byzantine Empire ====
- Spring – A fleet consisting of ships from the republics of Venice, Genoa and Pisa arrive at Constantinople. It is headed by Geoffrey II of Villehardouin, ruler of Achaea, who brings 100 of his own knights, 300 cross-bowman, and 500 archers. Geoffrey, formally a vassal of Emperor John I of Constantinople, breaks the blockade of the city, sinks 15 Byzantine ships and enters the Golden Horn. A treaty is signed for two years after the intervention of Angelo Sanudo, duke of Archipelago.

==== Europe ====
- June 20 – Treaty of Kremmen: Duke Wartislaw III recognizes the seignory of Henry Borwin III, lord of Rostock, after his successful expedition against Wartislaw, in which he has conquered Circipania, including the cities of Gnoien and Kalen. Meanwhile, Swietopelk II, Duke of Pomerania ("the Great") conquers Schlawe and Stolp, the eastern part of Pomerania. To ease the tensions with Brandenburg, Wartislaw signs the Kremmen agreement.
- June – The 16-year-old Alexander Nevsky is elected by the Novgorodians as prince (knyaz) of Novgorod, beseeching the young noble to take charge of the city's military affairs.
- June 29 – Siege of Córdoba: Castilian forces under King Ferdinand III ("the Saint") capture Muslim Córdoba from Emir Ibn Hud as part of the Reconquista of the Iberian Peninsula.
- July – At a diet (princely convention) in Piacenza, Emperor Frederick II proclaims his wish to recover all Italy for the Holy Roman Empire.
- September 22 – Battle of Saule: The Lithuanians and Semigallians defeat the Livonian Brothers of the Sword at Šiauliai in Lithuania.

==== England ====
- January 14 – King Henry III marries the 14-year-old Eleanor of Provence, one of the four daughters of Raimond Berenguer, count of Provence. The ceremony takes place at Canterbury Cathedral, with Simon de Montfort, as Lord High Steward, takes care of the banquet and kitchen arrangements. Eleanor is crowned queen at Westminster Abbey shortly afterward.
- A tournament at Tickhill turns into a battle between northerners and southerners, but peace is restored by papal legate Otto of Tonengo.

==== Mongol Empire ====
- The Mongols under Batu Khan, eldest of Jochi, sweep across Central Asia. They settle in the Russian steppe, curtailing the power of the Kievan Rus', extracting tribute from their neighbors, and disrupting their relationship with the Byzantine Empire.
- Autumn – Siege of Bilär: The Mongols under Batu Khan capture the capital city of Bilär after a siege that lasts for 45 days. The Volga Bulgars are defeated within the year, as are the Kipchaks and Alans.
- Mongol conquest of the Song dynasty: The Mongols under Ögedei Khan penetrate deep into the Southern Song. The important city of Xiangyang, gateway to the Yangtze plain, capitulates to them.

==== Asia ====
- October 10 – Razia Sultana, daughter of Mamluk Sultan Shamsuddin Iltutmish, becomes the first female Muslim ruler of the Indian subcontinent, deposing her half-brother, Ruknuddin Firuz, as sultan of the Delhi Sultanate.
- King Kalinga Magha ("the Tyrant") is expelled from Polonnaruwa to Jaffna, capital of the Jaffna Kingdom (located in modern Sri Lanka).

==== Africa ====
- Kouroukan Fouga, the constitution of the Mali Empire, is created by an assembly of nobles of the Mandinka clan.

=== By topic ===
==== Literature ====
- The Goryeo court in Korea orders the preparation of another set of woodblocks for printing the Buddhist Tripiṭaka ("Triple Basket") – which is intended both to gain protection against the Mongol invaders and to replace the earlier 11th century set that was destroyed by the Mongols in 1232.

==== Religion ====
- Pope Gregory IX condemns the links that both the Knights Templer and Knights Hospitaller have with the Assassin fighters in the Middle East. He issues a bull (a formal papal proclamation) preventing further contact with the Assassins.
- May 6 – Roger of Wendover, English Benedictine monk and chronicler, dies at St Albans Abbey. His chronicle is continued by Matthew Paris.

== Births ==
- January 1 – Baldwin de Redvers, English nobleman (d. 1262)
- June 6 – Wen Tianxiang, Chinese poet and politician (d. 1283)
- June 8 – Violant of Aragon, queen consort of Castile (d. 1301)
- October – Qutb al-Din al-Shirazi, Persian polymath and poet (d. 1311)
- after October – Alice de Lusignan (or Angoulême), French-born English countess (d. 1290)
- November 8 – Lu Xiufu, Chinese general and politician (d. 1279)
- Albert I, Duke of Brunswick-Lüneburg ("the Great"), German nobleman and regent (d. 1279)
- Bayan of the Baarin (or Boyan), Mongol general (d. 1295)
- Elizabeth of Hungary, duchess consort of Bavaria (d. 1271)
- Henry II of Rodez, French nobleman and troubadour (d. 1304)
- Olivier II de Clisson, Breton nobleman and knight (d. 1307)
- Stephen the Posthumous, Hungarian pretender (d. 1271)

== Deaths ==
- January 14 – Sava ("the Enlightener"), Serbian archbishop
- March 15 – Mu'in al-Din Chishti, Persian preacher (b. 1143)
- March 28 – Conon of Naso, Italian priest and abbot (b. 1139)
- April 11 – Walter II de Beauchamp, English sheriff (b. 1192)
- May 1 – William d'Aubigny (or d'Albini), English nobleman
- May 6 – Roger of Wendover, English monk and chronicler
- May 7 – Agnellus of Pisa, Italian Franciscan friar (b. 1195)
- June 10 – Diana degli Andalò, Italian nun and saint (b. 1201)
- July 18 – Valdemar of Denmark, Danish bishop and statesman (b. 1158)
- July 29 – Ingeborg of Denmark, queen consort of France (b. 1174)
- August 16 – Thomas Blunville, English priest and bishop
- August 17 – William de Blois, English bishop and sheriff
- September 12 – Thomas of Marlborough, English abbot
- September 22 – Volkwin von Naumburg, German knight
- November 15 – Lope Díaz II, Castilian nobleman (b. 1170)
- November 26 – Al-Aziz Muhammad, Ayyubid ruler (b. 1213)
- Barisone III of Torres, Sardinian judge of Logudoro (b. 1221)
- Dirk I van Brederode, Dutch nobleman and knight (b. 1180)
- Fakhr-i Mudabbir, Ghaznavid historian and writer (b. 1157)
- Gautier de Coincy, French abbot and troubadour (b. 1177)
- John of Ibelin, constable and regent of Jerusalem (b. 1179)
- Philip d'Aubigny, French nobleman and chancellor (b. 1166)
- Saifuddin Aibak, Mamluk Sultanate governor and politician
