= Siege of Bilär =

Siege in 1236

- Part of the Mongol invasion of Volga Bulgaria
Date	1236
Location	Bilär, Volga Bulgaria
Result	Mongol victory
Territorial changes	Fall of Volga Bulgaria

Belligerents
Volga Bulgaria	Mongol Empire

Commanders and leaders
Mir-Ghazi	Batu Khan; Subutai

Strength
10,000–50,000^{1}	100,000–150,000^{2}

Casualties and losses
Entire army and population	Few
- ^{1} Friar Julian^{2} only Batu's horde

The siege of Bilär was a battle for the capital city of Volga Bulgaria, between the Volga Bulgars and the Mongols. It took place in the autumn of 1236 and lasted 45 days. It ended with the destruction of Bilär and the massacre of its population, estimated at several dozen thousand.

After the Battle of Samara Bend, the Bolghars renovated Bilär's fortifications. The third 11-kilometre-long wall of stone and wood encircled the city. However, after the Mongols besieged the city, it withstood the siege only for 45 days.

By the materials uncovered by archaeological excavations, the city was burnt after falling, and the unburied remains of its population were found all over Bilär. The excavations prove the Kazan Tatar legends and the Russian chronicles, which wrote that the Mongols:

…взяша славный Великий город Болгарьский и избиша оружием от старца и до унаго и до сущаго младенца, и взяша товара множества, а город пожгоша огнем, и всю землю их плениша.

…took the glorious Great city of Bolghar and massacred everybody, from monks to babies, and took many goods and set fire to the city and captivated their land.

Then, the Mongols destroyed many Bulgarian cities, but the country's north remained intact, so many survivors resettled to the North and the West from the Bulgarian mainland. The country was incorporated into the Ulus Jochi, but the resistance lasted forty years.

Some years after the fall of Bilär, Bolghars tried to revive the Great City, but this attempt had no result.
