= Alexeyevskoye, Republic of Tatarstan =

Alexeyevskoye Алексеевское
- Urban-type settlement

Other transcription(s)
  - Tatar: Алексеевское
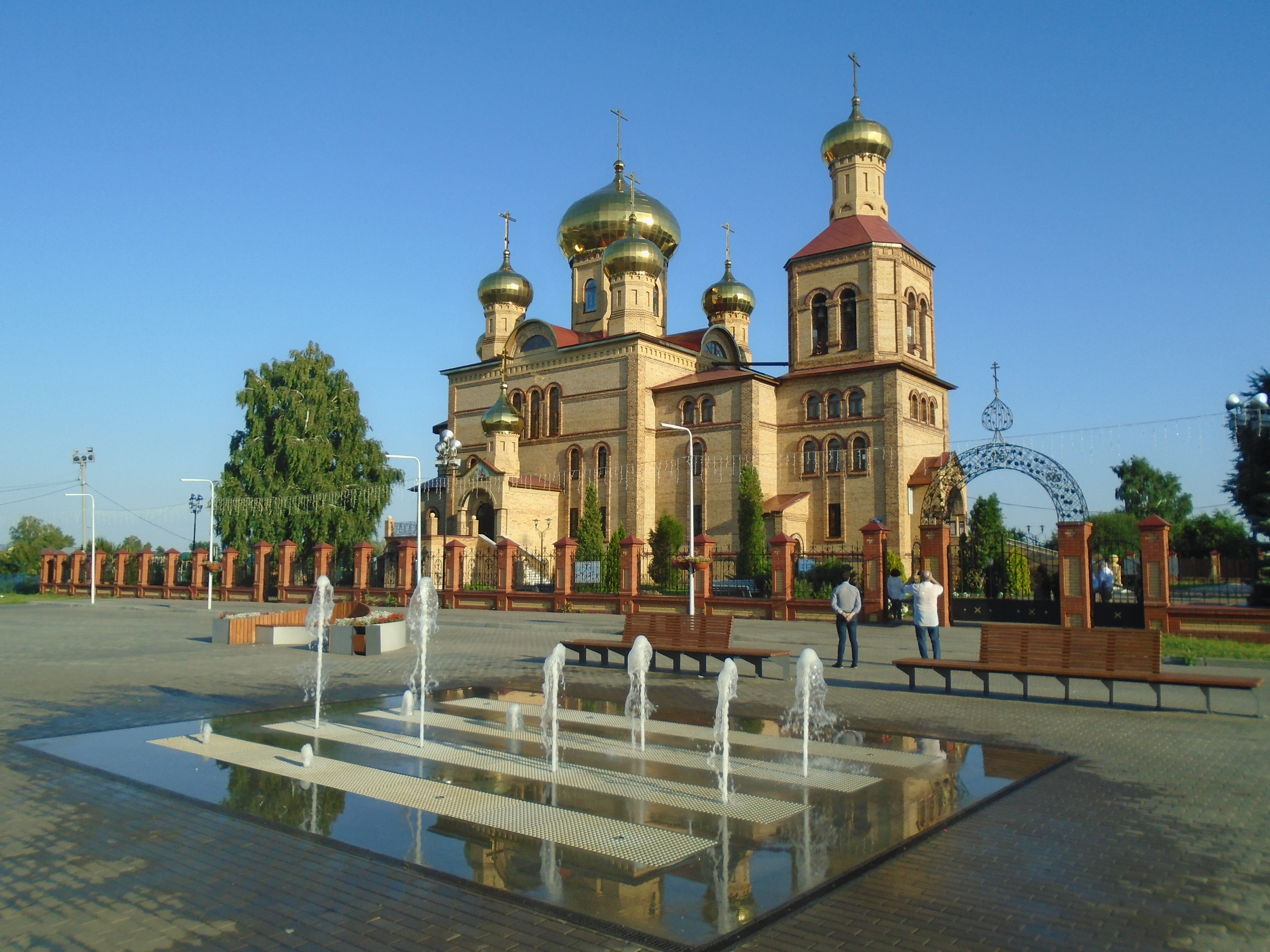
- Interactive map of Alexeyevskoye
- Location of Alexeyevskoye Alexeyevskoye (Tatarstan)
- Coordinates: 55°18′N 50°07′E
- Country: Russia
- Federal subject: Tatarstan
- Administrative district: Alexeyevsky District
- Founded: 1710
- Urban-type settlement status since: 1965
- Elevation: 56 m (184 ft)

Population (2010 Census)
  - Total: 11,224
  - Estimate (2021): 11,613 (+3.5%)

Administrative status
  - Capital of: Alexeyevsky District

Municipal status
  - Municipal district: Alexeyevsky Municipal District
  - Urban settlement: Alexeyevskoye Urban Settlement
  - Capital of: Alexeyevsky Municipal District, Alexeyevskoye Urban Settlement
- Time zone: UTC+3 (MSK)
- Postal codes: 422900, 422901, 422939
- OKTMO ID: 92606151051

Alexeyevskoye population
- 2010 Census: 11,224
- 2002 Census: 9,720
- 1989 Census: 8,146
- 1979 Census: 6,776

Alexeyevskoye (Russian: Алексе́евское; Tatar: Алексеевское) is an urban locality (an urban-type settlement) and the administrative center of Alexeyevsky District in the Republic of Tatarstan, Russia, located on the Kama River on the left bank of the Kuybyshev Reservoir. As of the 2010 Census, its population was 11,224.

== History ==
It was established in 1710 and was granted urban-type settlement status in 1965.

== Administrative and municipal status ==
Within the framework of administrative divisions, the urban-type settlement of Alexeyevskoye serves as the administrative center of Alexeyevsky District, of which it is a part. As a municipal division, Alexeyevskoye is incorporated within Alexeyevsky Municipal District as Alexeyevskoye Urban Settlement.
