= Bilär =

Medieval Volga Bulgarian city in Alexeevsky District, Tatarstan, Russia

- Location within Tatarstan Location within Russia
- 54°59′07″N 50°23′52″E
- Location: Alexeyevsky District, Tatarstan, Russia
- Region: Russia
- Part of: Tatarstan

History
- Built: 10th century

Site notes
- Archaeologists: Fayaz Huzin; Albert Khalikov
- Condition: Semi-ruined
- Owner: Public
- Public access: Yes

Bilär or Bilyarsk (Tatar: Биләр; Russian: Биля́р, Билярское городище, romanized: Bilyar, Bilyarskoye gorodishche) was a medieval city in Volga Bulgaria and its second capital before the Mongol invasion of Volga Bulgaria. It was located on the left bank of the Small Cheremshan River in Alexeeyevsky District of the Tatarstan. Its erstwhile location is 50 kilometres (31 mi) from the current village of the same name and 150 kilometres (93 mi) from Kazan.

== History ==
The city was founded around 10th century by the indigenous Bilär tribe of the Volga Bulgars. In Russian chronicles, it was also known as the "Great City" (Russian: Великий город), because its population reputedly was in excess of 100,000.

Bilyar was one of the main trade centers in the Middle Volga, and alternatively with the Bulgar city and Nur-Suvar, served as the capital of Volga Bulgaria in the 12th and 13th centuries. In 1236, the city was sacked by the army of Batu Khan. The city was later rebuilt, but it never regained its former size or power. The city's ruins (nearly 8 square kilometres (3.1 sq mi)) were explored by Rychkov, Tatischev, Khalikov and Khuchin.

Bilyar was the capital of the Volga-Kama-Bulgaria from the 10th century until the early 13th century. It was also one of the largest cities of medieval Eurasia. The end of the city in 1236 also resulted in the loss of its monumental architecture.

In 1654, near the site of Bilyar, a Russian border fort called Bilär was founded.

Bilyar Point on Livingston Island in the South Shetland Islands, Antarctica is named after Bilär.

== In popular culture ==
Bilyarsk was the home of a fictional Soviet air force base in Craig Thomas' Firefox novel and subsequent film, about the fictional MiG-31 Firefox aircraft stolen by United States Air Force pilot Mitchell Gant. In reality, Bilyarsk has no airport and the closest full-service airport is in Kazan, Tatarstan in Russia, 98 kilometres (61 mi) northwest of Bilyarsk.

== Notable people ==
- Alexander Arbuzov (1877–1968), chemist

== Gallery ==
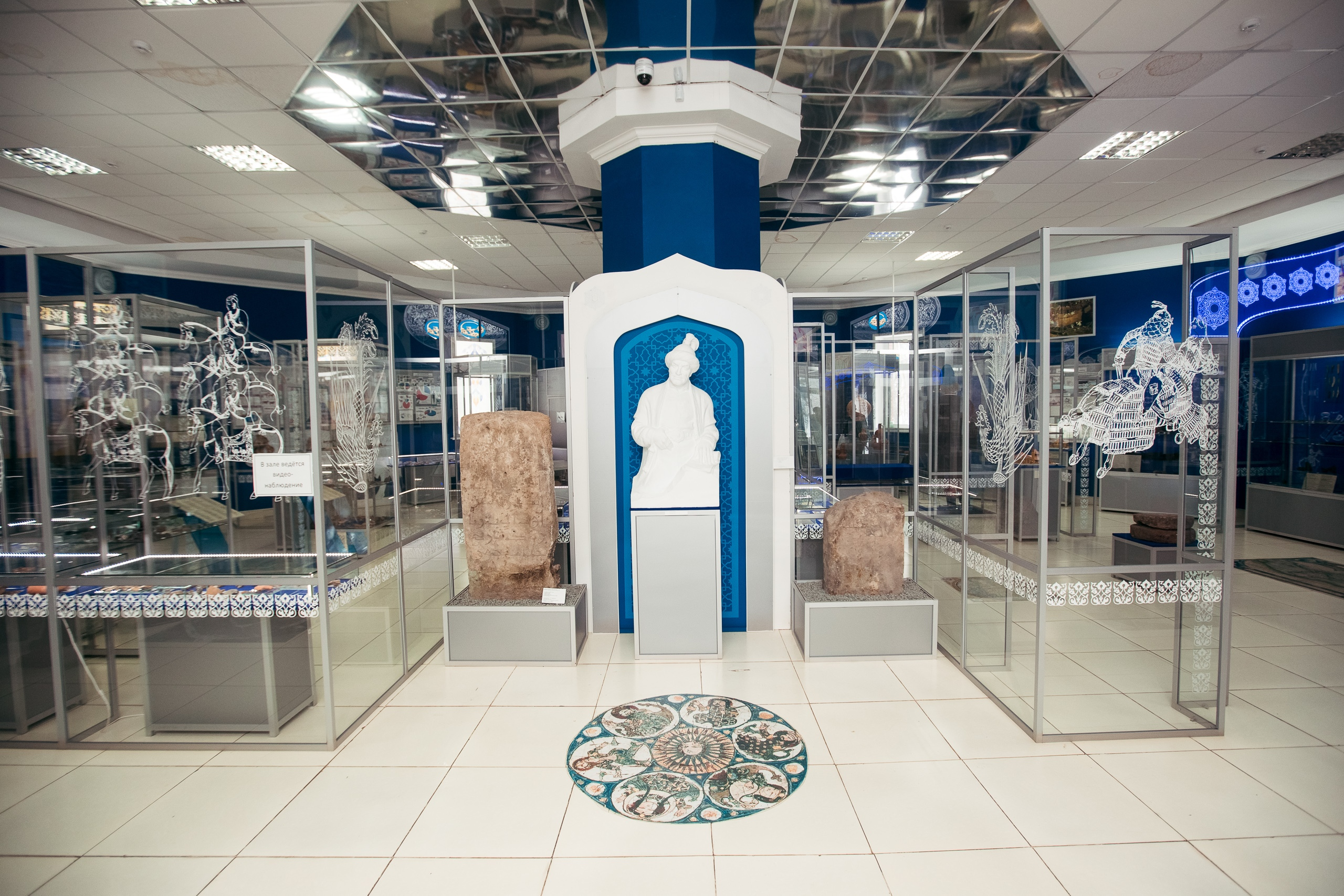
Bilyar Historical Archeological Museum

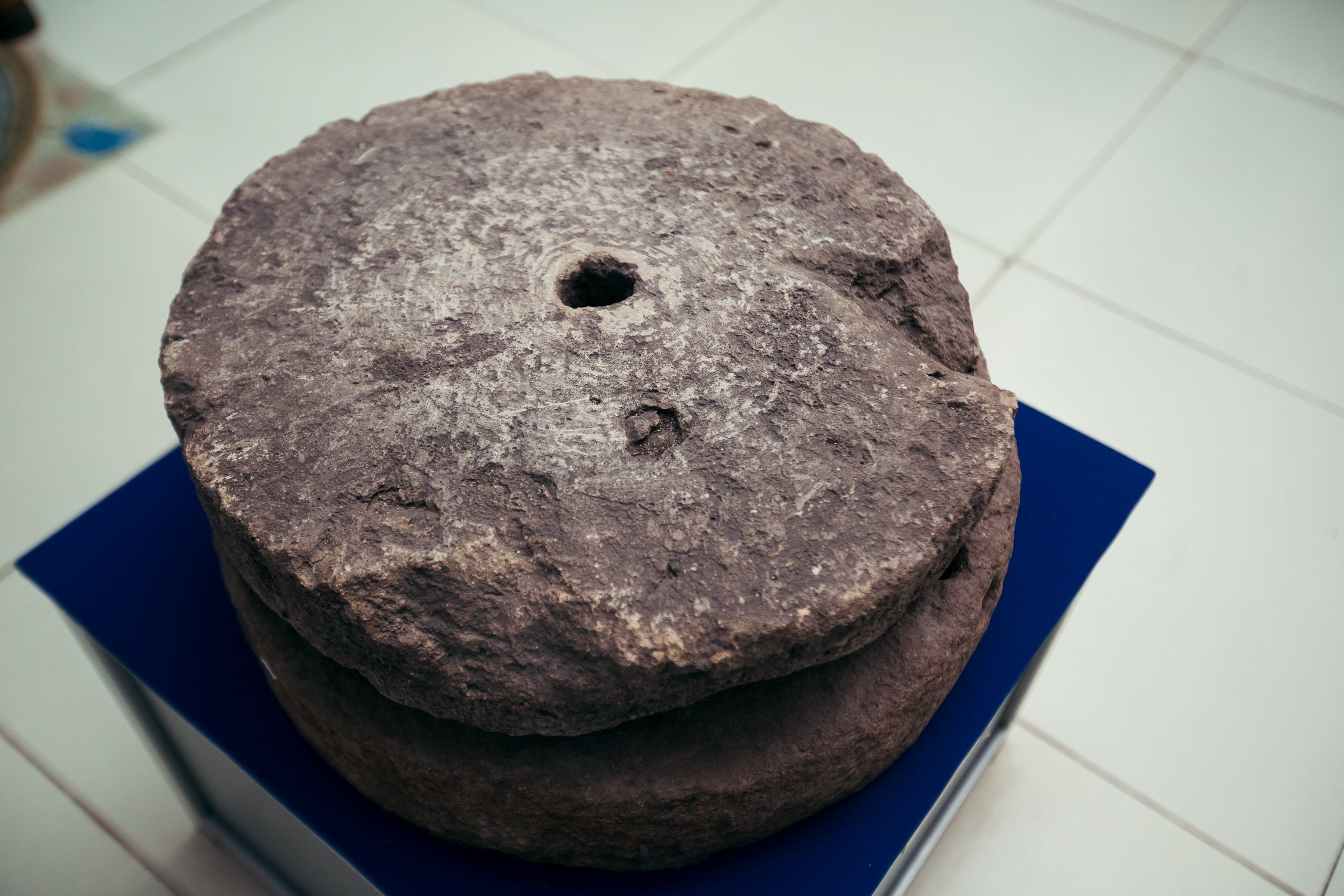
A piece of Bilyar mill

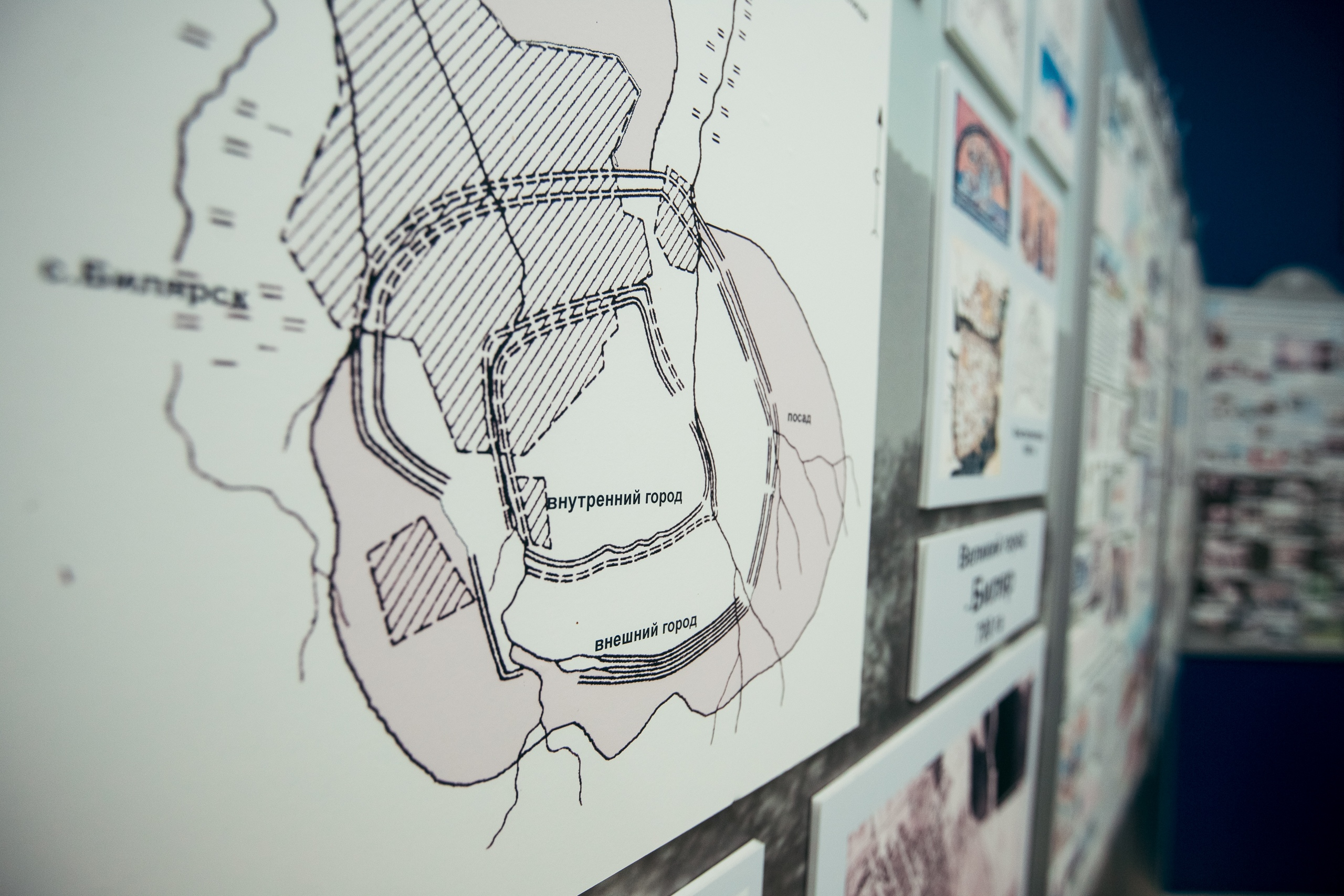
Old Bilyar map

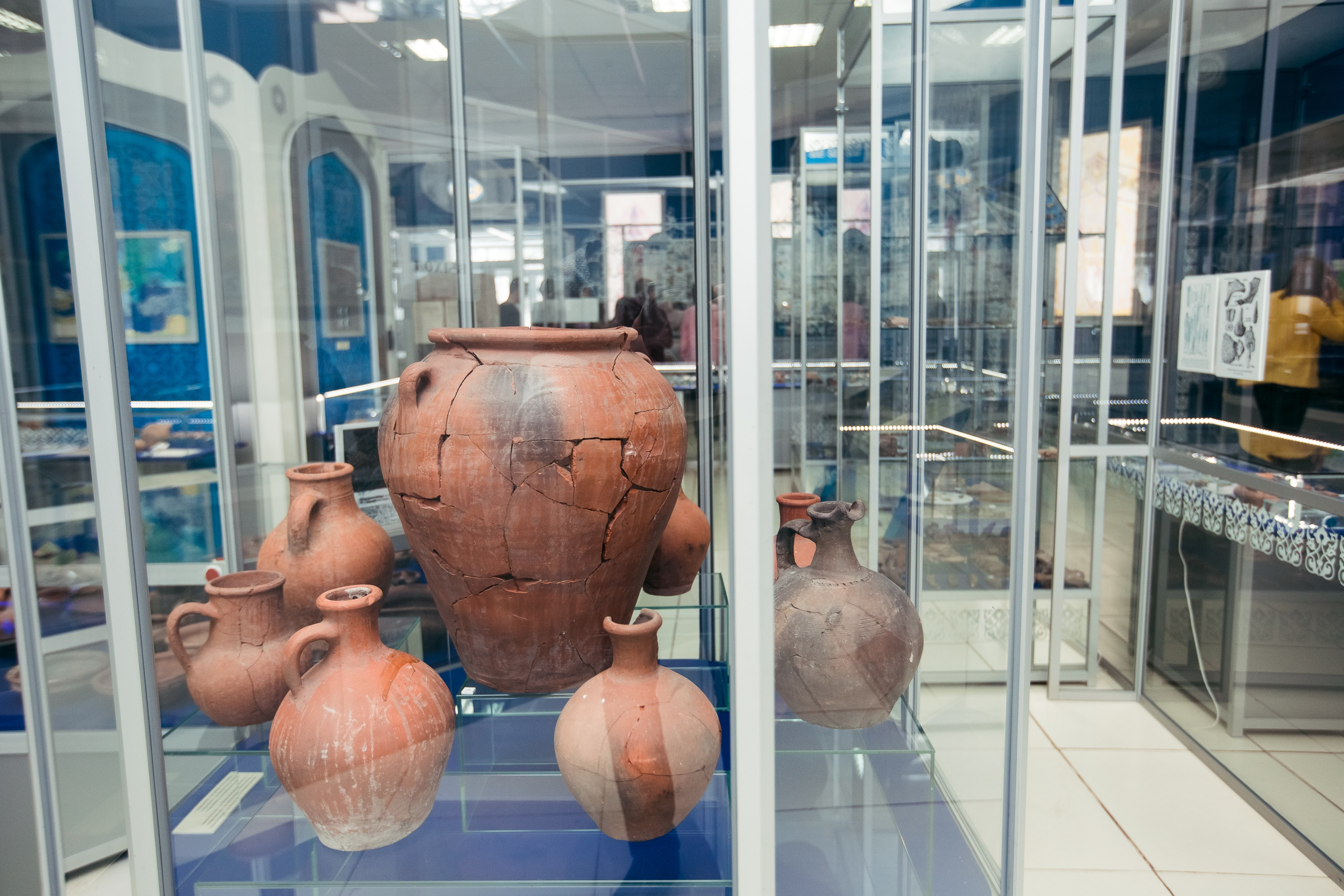
Old pots from ancient Bilyar

== See also ==
- Bulgars
- Great Bulgaria
- Mount Imeon
- Bahlikas
- Bìlà (弊剌, from MC *bjiej^{H}-lat) (another name of either the Alats or the Basmyls)

== Resources ==
- Fayaz Sharipovich Huzin | BILYAR - BULGARIAN GREAT CITY (Publisher "Zaman" Republic of Tatarstan). Russian (Хузин Фаяз Шариповичь | Биляр - Великий Город Болгарский (Издательство «Заман» Республика Татарстан))
