= Alexeyevsky District, Republic of Tatarstan =

Alexeyevsky District Алексеевский район (Russian)
- District

Other transcription(s)
  - Tatar: Алексеевск районы
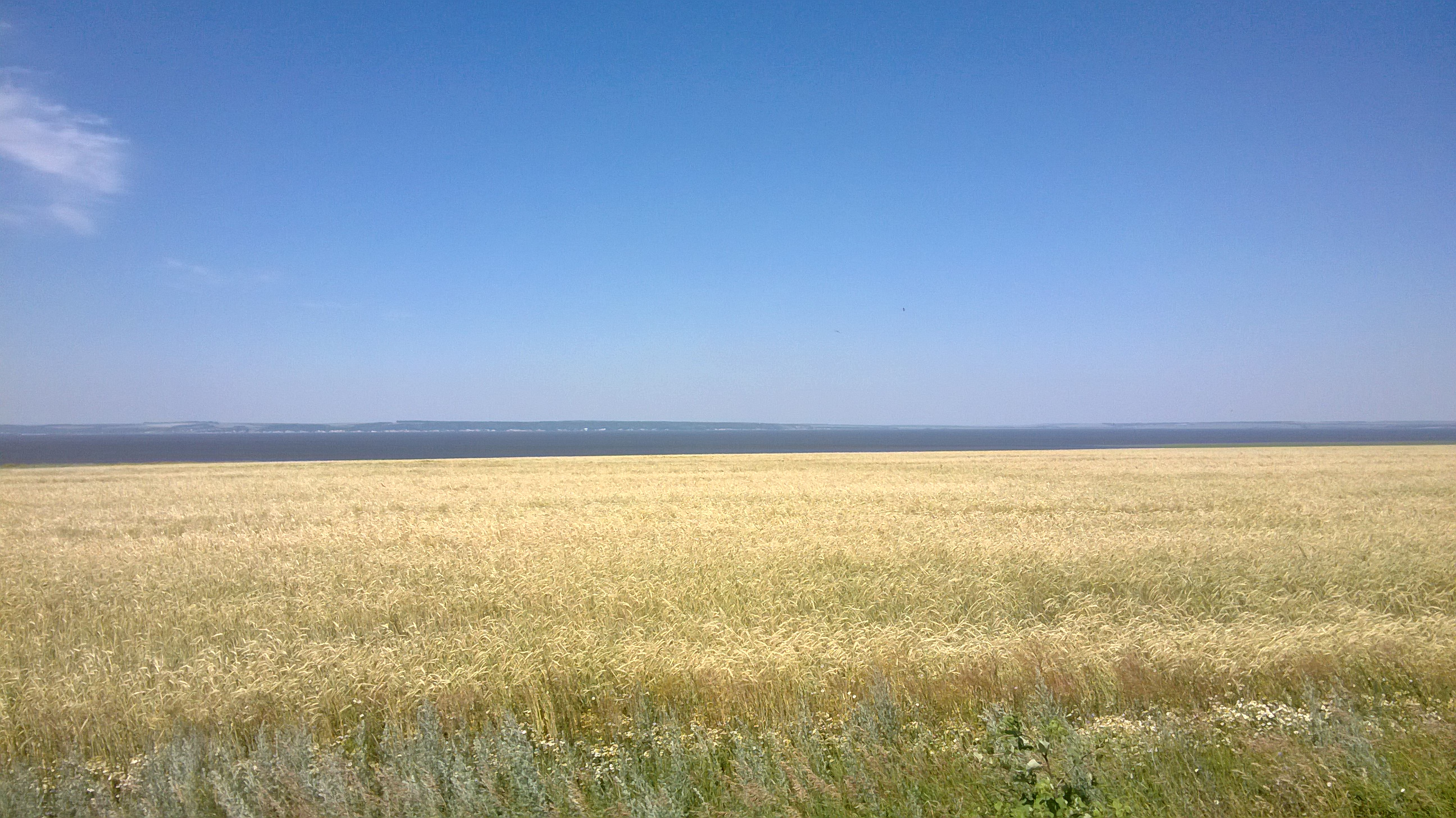
- Kama River in Alexeyevsky District

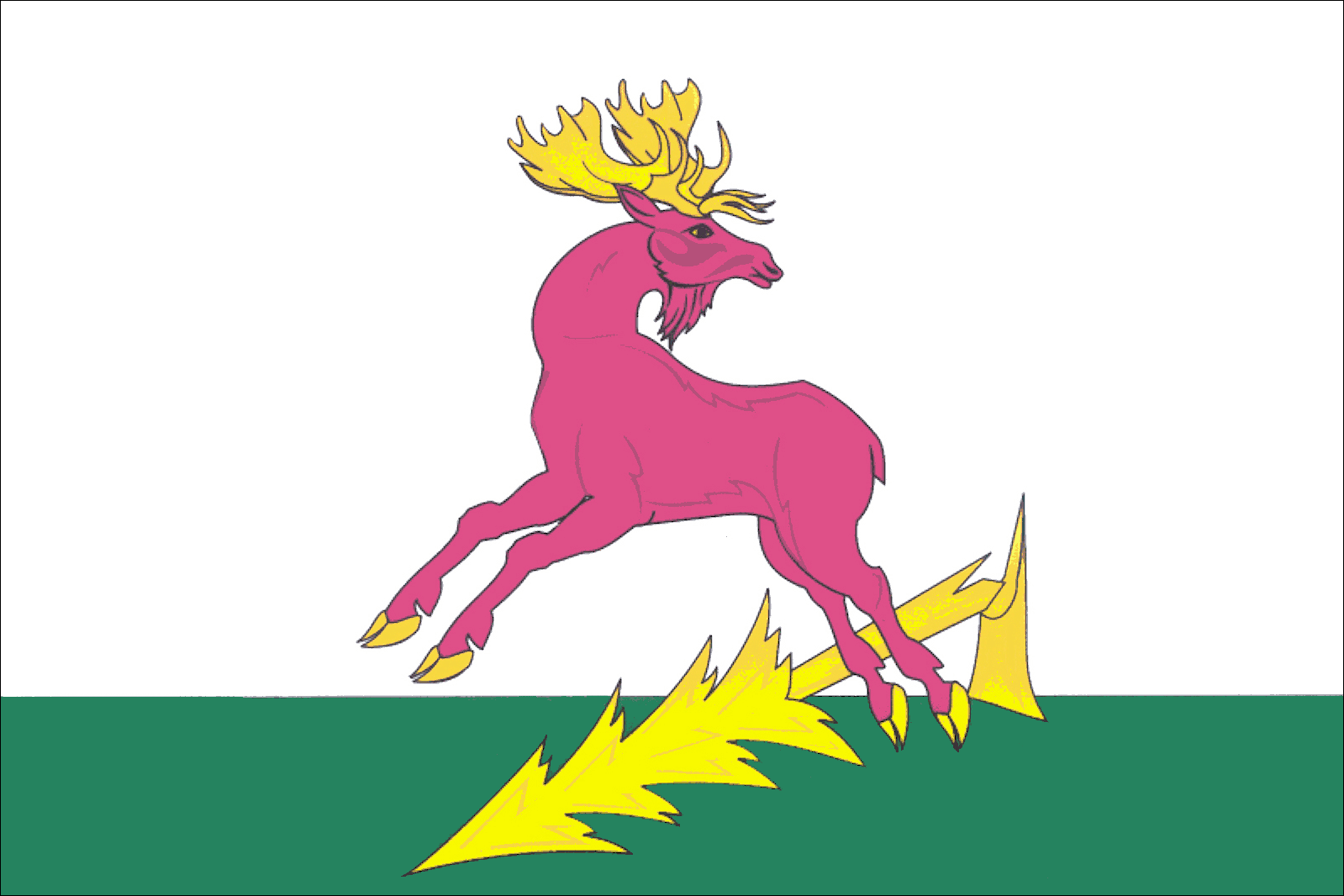
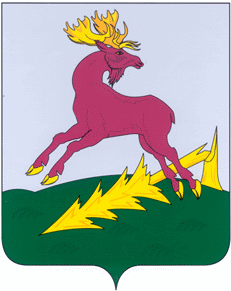
- Flag Coat of arms
- Location of Alexeyevsky District in the Republic of Tatarstan
- Coordinates: 55°09′N 50°08′E
- Country: Russia
- Federal subject: Republic of Tatarstan
- Established: 10 August 1930
- Administrative center: Alexeyevskoye

Area
  - Total: 2,080.1 km^{2} (803.1 sq mi)

Population (2010 Census)
  - Total: 26,236
  - Density: 12.613/km^{2} (32.667/sq mi)
  - Urban: 42.8%
  - Rural: 57.2%

Administrative structure
  - Inhabited localities: 1 urban-type settlements, 58 rural localities

Municipal structure
  - Municipally incorporated as: Alexeyevsky Municipal District
  - Municipal divisions: 1 urban settlements, 19 rural settlements
- Time zone: UTC+3 (MSK)
- OKTMO ID: 92606000
- Website: http://alekseevskiy.tatarstan.ru/

Alexeyevsky District (Russian: Алексе́евский райо́н; Tatar: Алексеевск районы) is a territorial administrative unit and municipal district of the Republic of Tatarstan within the Russian Federation. It is located in the central part of the region, on the left bank of the Kama river. The administrative center of the district is the urban-type settlement of Alekseevskoe.

The district was formed on August 10, 1930. In 1963, it was abolished and its lands transferred to the Chistopolsky District. The district was reestablished as an administrative unit on March 4, 1964.

== Geography ==
The Alekseevsky district encompasses 2074.4 km². The district is located in the central part of the Republic of Tatarstan along the Kazan - Orenburg federal highway. The administrative center of the region is the urban-type settlement of Alekseevskoe which is located on the shore of the Kuybyshev Reservoir, 108 km south-east of Kazan.

The district borders the Chistopolsky, Aksubaevsky, Nurlatsky, Alkeyvsky and Spassky districts of the republic. It shares a water border with Laishevsky and Rybno-Slobodsky districts in Kuybyshev Reservoir.

== Coat of arms and flag ==
The coat of arms and flag of the Alekseevsky district was approved by the Council of the Alekseevsky municipal district on May 10, 2006. The imagery was developed by the Heraldic Council under the President of the Republic of Tatarstan together with the Union of heraldry of Russia. It is based on the regimental coat of arms of the Bilyar Landmilitsky Regiment from 1747.

A purple elk is depicted in the center of the coat of arms in honor of the city of Bilär, the military-political center of Volga Bulgaria which had been located on the territory of the region since the Middle Ages. Purple symbolizes power and nobility, the elk - freedom and dignity. A broken golden spruce signifies the Zakamskaya zasechnaya line that stood on the lands of the modern region in the 17th century and which included the village of Bilyarsk, founded in 1654 as a fortress.

== History ==
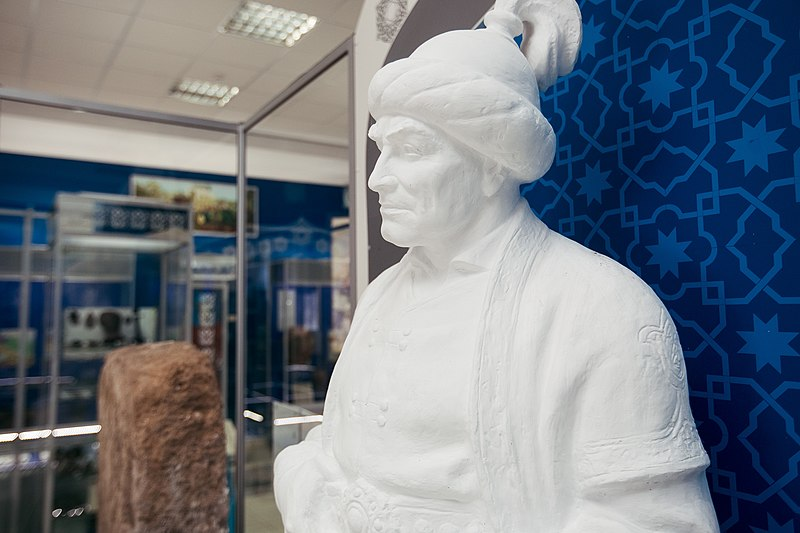
Sculpture of Almış

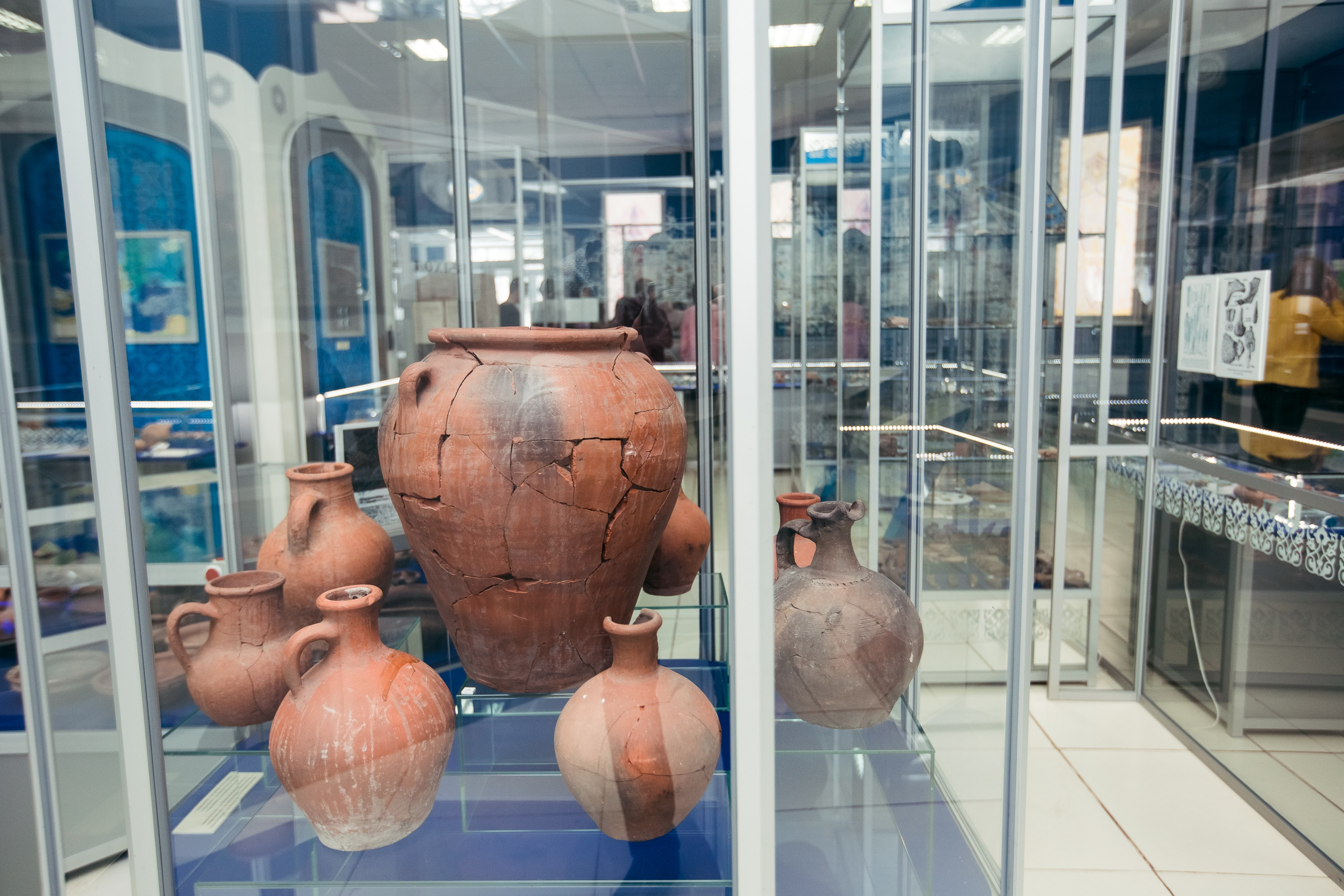
Archaeological findings

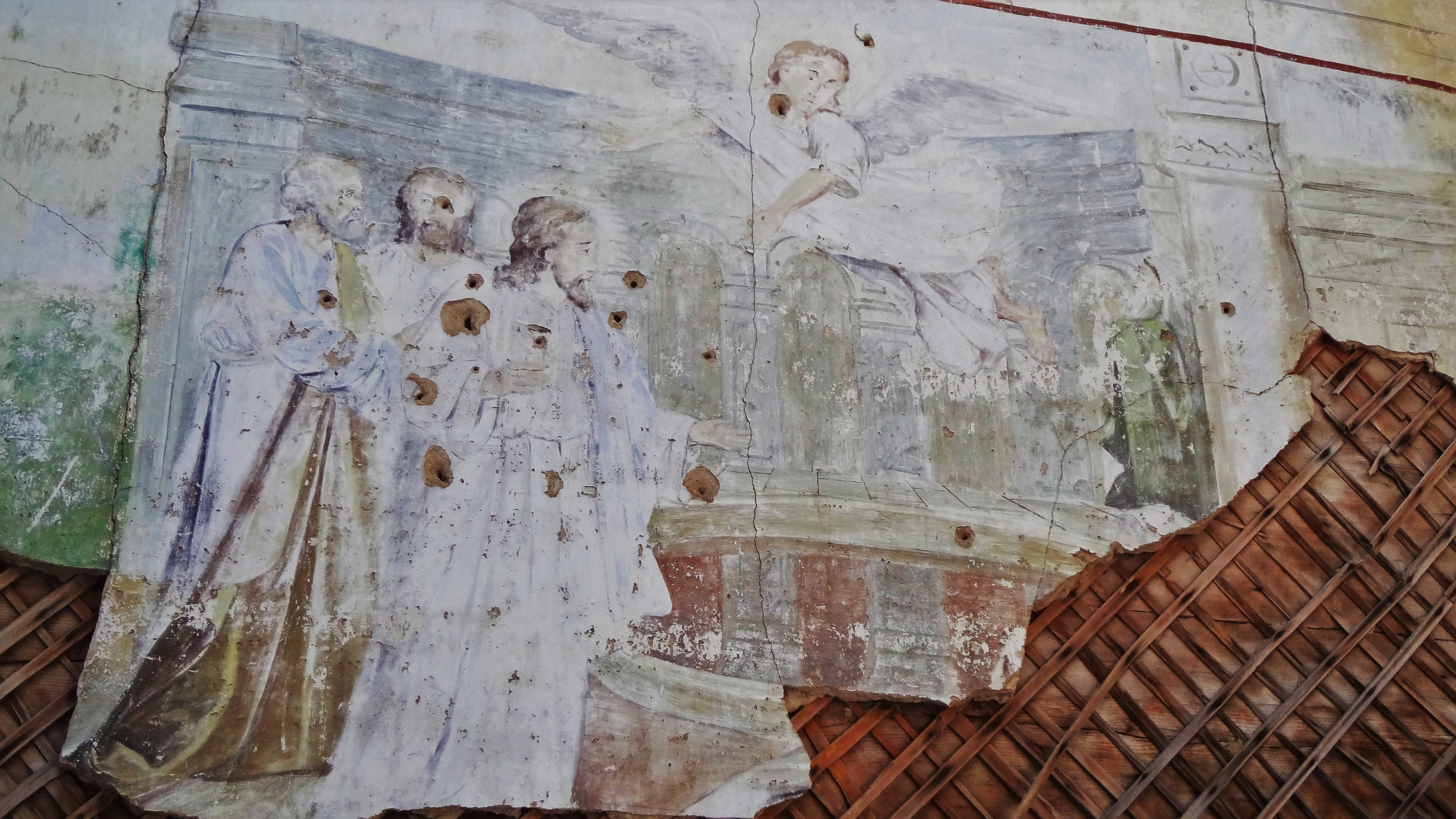
Remains of the fresco of the Archangel Michael Church in the village of Sakony

The center of the district is located on the territory of the former village of Alekseevskoye which was founded at the beginning of the 18th century. At the end of the 19th - beginning of the 20th centuries, the wool spinning, plaster and furnace industries developed in the village.

Until 1920, the territories of the region belonged to the Laishevsky, Spassky and Chistopol districts. Beginning in 1920, cantons replaced districts in the administrative system of the region. The district first appeared as an independent administrative entity of the TASSR on August 10, 1930. In 1963, it was abolished and its territory was transferred to the Chistopol region until the district was reconstituted on March 4, 1964.

From 2005 to 2018, the head of the district was Vladimir Konstantinovich Kozonkov. Subsequently this position would be taken on by Sergey Anatolyevich Demidov. The District Executive Committee is headed by Oleg Gainullin.

== Population ==
As of 2020, 24,969 people lived in the district. About 60% of the district population are Russians, Tatars constitute 30%, Chuvash - 6% and representatives of other ethnicities make up another 4%. 46.43% of the district's population live in urban settlements.

== Municipal-territorial structure ==
There are 59 settlements in the Alekseevsky district which make up the constituent parts of one urban and 19 rural settlements.

== Economy ==
=== State of the District Economy ===
As of 2020, the Alekseevsky district occupied 34th place (out of 43) in the rankings of quality of life in the municipalities of Tatarstan. In 2019, the volume of investment per person in fixed assets in the district amounted to 16,314 rubles and the average salary in the region was 30,586 rubles (lower than the republic average of 37,418 rubles).

Agriculture plays an important role in the district economy. The total area of farmland in the district is 126.6 thousand hectares. The main branches of agriculture in the district are dairy and beef cattle breeding, and the production of grain and fodder crops such as spring wheat, winter rye, barley, peas and oats. As for the division of arable land use in the Alekseevsky district, more than 40% is allocated for grain crops, 36% for fodder crops and 9% for industrial crops. Private family farms are an actively developing sector, for example, by 2015, 21 farms had been built in the region, producing 788 tons of milk and 54 tons of meat per year.

Industry in the region is represented mainly by light industries and manufacturers of building materials. Among large regional companies operating in the district are the Alekseevsky Milk Canning Factory, the Alekseevskaya Factory of Artistic Weaving, the Alekseevskdorstroy and Alekseevskaya Ceramics. The latter attracted 75 million rubles of investment in 2014. These funds were used to reconstruct a workshop for the production of facing bricks and the installation of new drying chambers and kilns.

The gross regional product of the district amounted to 8.1 billion rubles in 2016 . According to statistics from 2017, 117 small businesses and 458 entrepreneurs were registered in the district. In the same year, the registered unemployment rate was 0.56%.

=== Transport ===
The R-239 "Kazan - Orenburg - border with Kazakhstan" highway passes through the territory of the district, crossing the Kama river on a bridge near the village of Alekseevskoye and exiting the bridge to the east towards the city of Chistopol. The highway 16K-0191 Alekseevskoe - Vysoky Kolok leads westward from the bridge to Samara, from which the road 16K-0196 Levashevo - Tukai goes on to Bolgar. The “Alekseevskoe - Bilyarsk - Mamykovo” road to Nurlat leads from the district center to the south. A section of highway heading south from the bridge belongs to the transport corridor "Western Europe - Western China" although construction of this section is still ongoing.

== Ecology ==
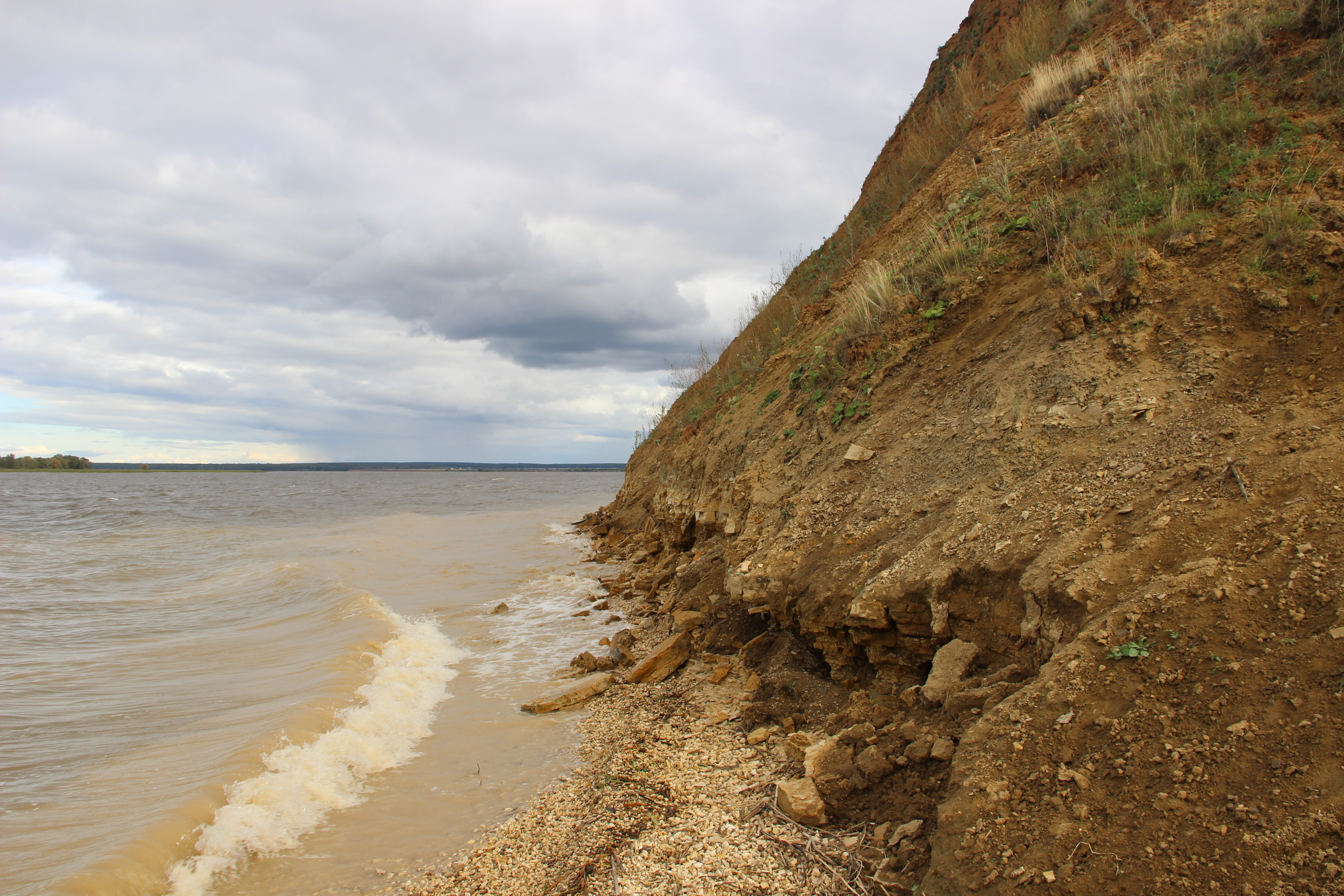
Kama river

There are four objects belonging to the natural reserve fund of regional significance in the Alekseevsky district:

- Lake "Proval" is a natural monument in the village of Khoteevka. The lake was formed in 1895 as a sinkhole – the water washed the voids under the village houses and they fell to a depth of 20 m.
- The 213 km long Maly Cheremshan river (of which 192 km passes through the territory of Tatarstan) and has a drainage basin of 3190 km².
- The state hunting zakaznik "Bilyarsky", established in 1967 to restore and preserve hunting resources in the ecological-geographical zone of the Trans-Kama region on the territory of the republic.
- The State nature reserve "Ivanovsky pine forest" with an area of 587 hectares, located on an island in the vicinity of the village of Ivanovsky. 70 bird species have been identified in the reserve, 16 of which are protected species listed in the Red Book of Tatarstan.

== Social and Cultural Life ==
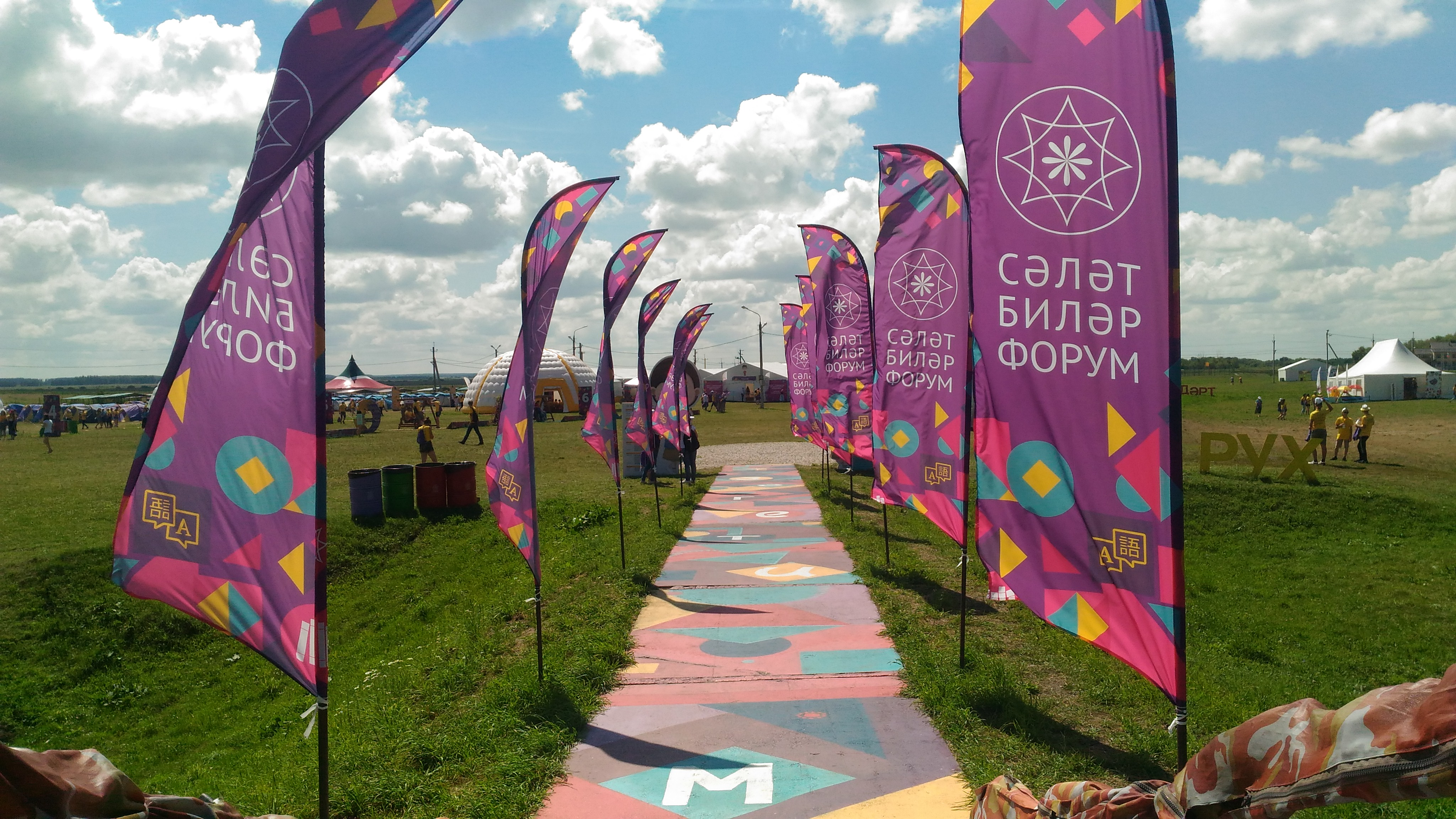
Youth organisation “Selet”

There are 57 educational institutions in the Alekseevsky district. The cultural sphere is represented by libraries, the museum of the native land named after local historian Vitaly Abramov and the Bolshetigan Museum named after Salikh Battal. The newspaper "Zarya" ("Tak") is published in the region in the Russian and Tatar languages.

One of the main attractions of the region is the Bilyarsky Historical and Archaeological Museum-Reserve, created in 1992 on the basis of preserved buildings in the Bilyarsky settlement - the capital of Volga Bulgaria in the X-XIII centuries. Bilyar itself is a complex of monuments with an area of 800 hectares, which includes fortifications, vast suburbs, necropolises, country estates and more. Since 2013, the museum has been annually holding the Spring Paradise holiday, where creative teams of different nations perform. For more than 10 years, the Ministry of Youth Affairs of Tatarstan has held an annual school forum “Selet” in the reserve [.
