= Kazan =

Capital city of Tatarstan, Russia

Kazan Казань
- City of republic significance

Other transcription(s)
  - Tatar: Казан
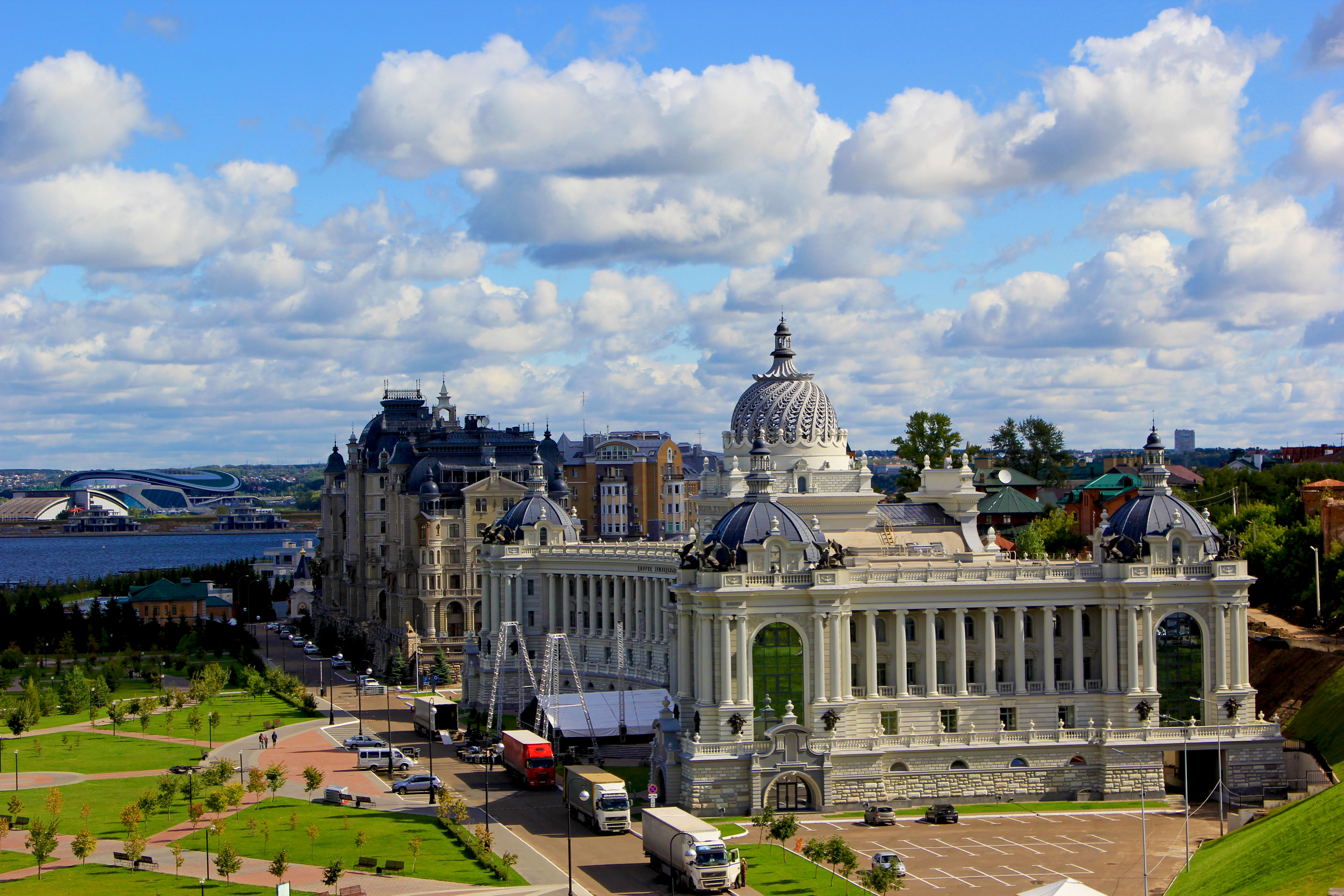
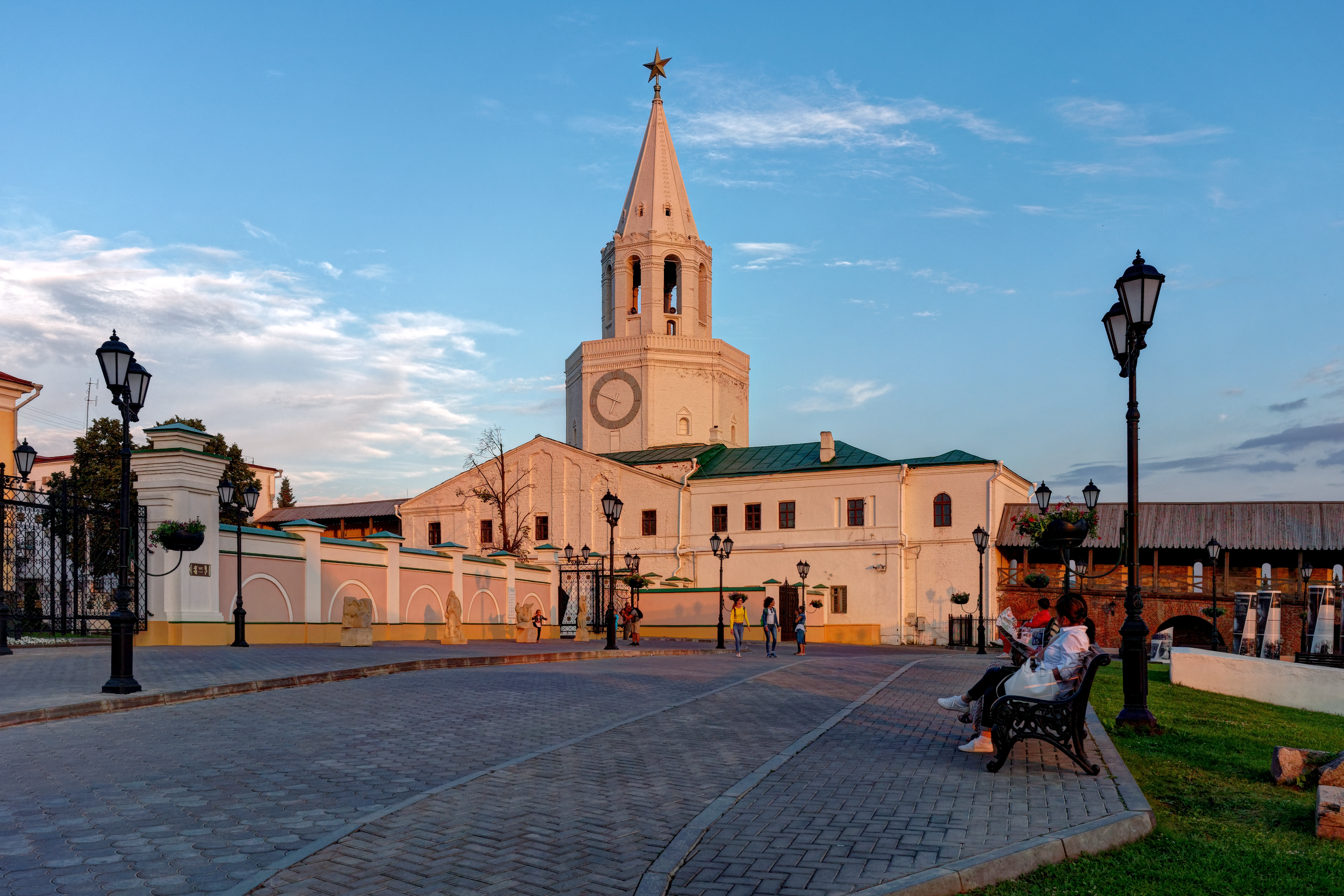
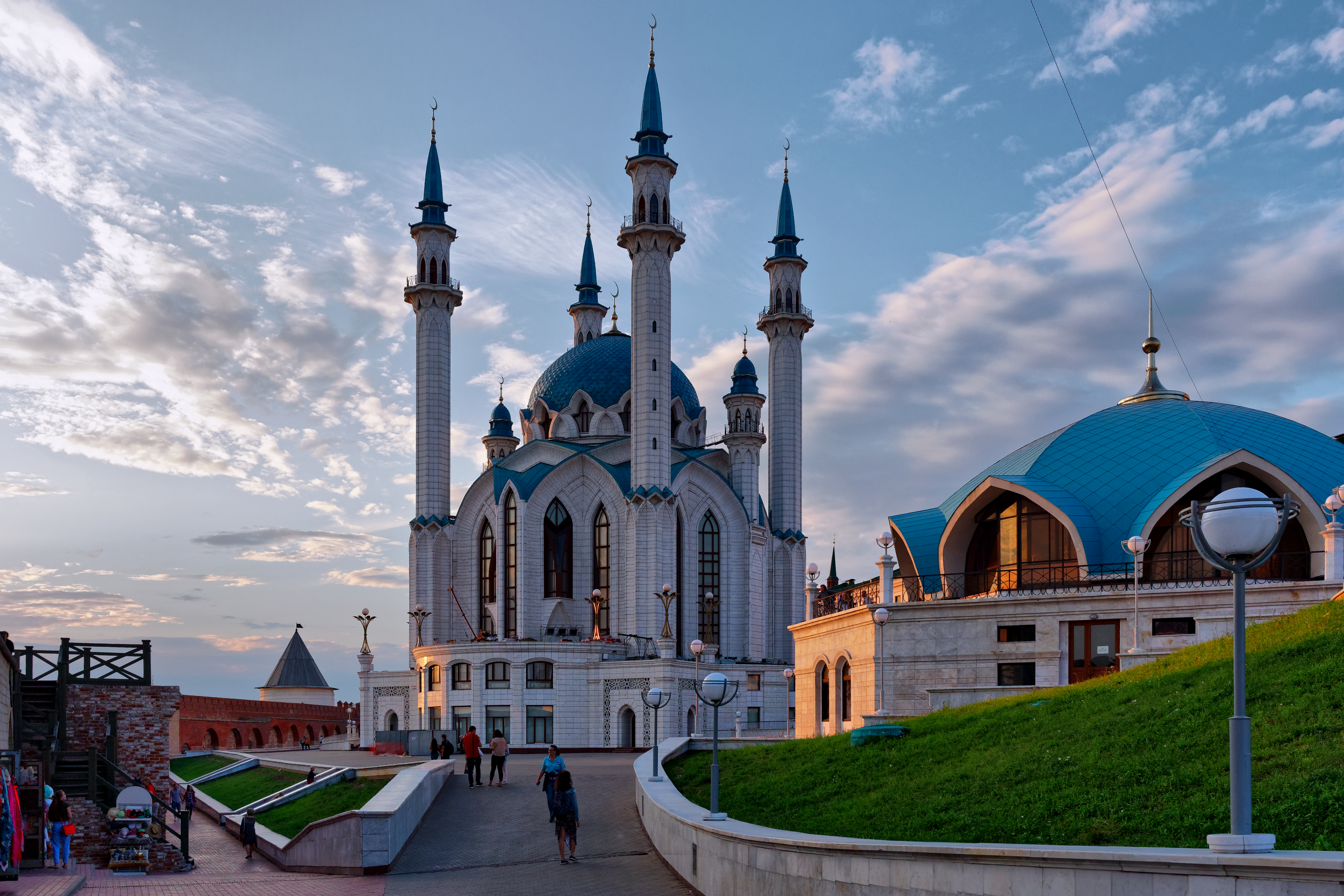
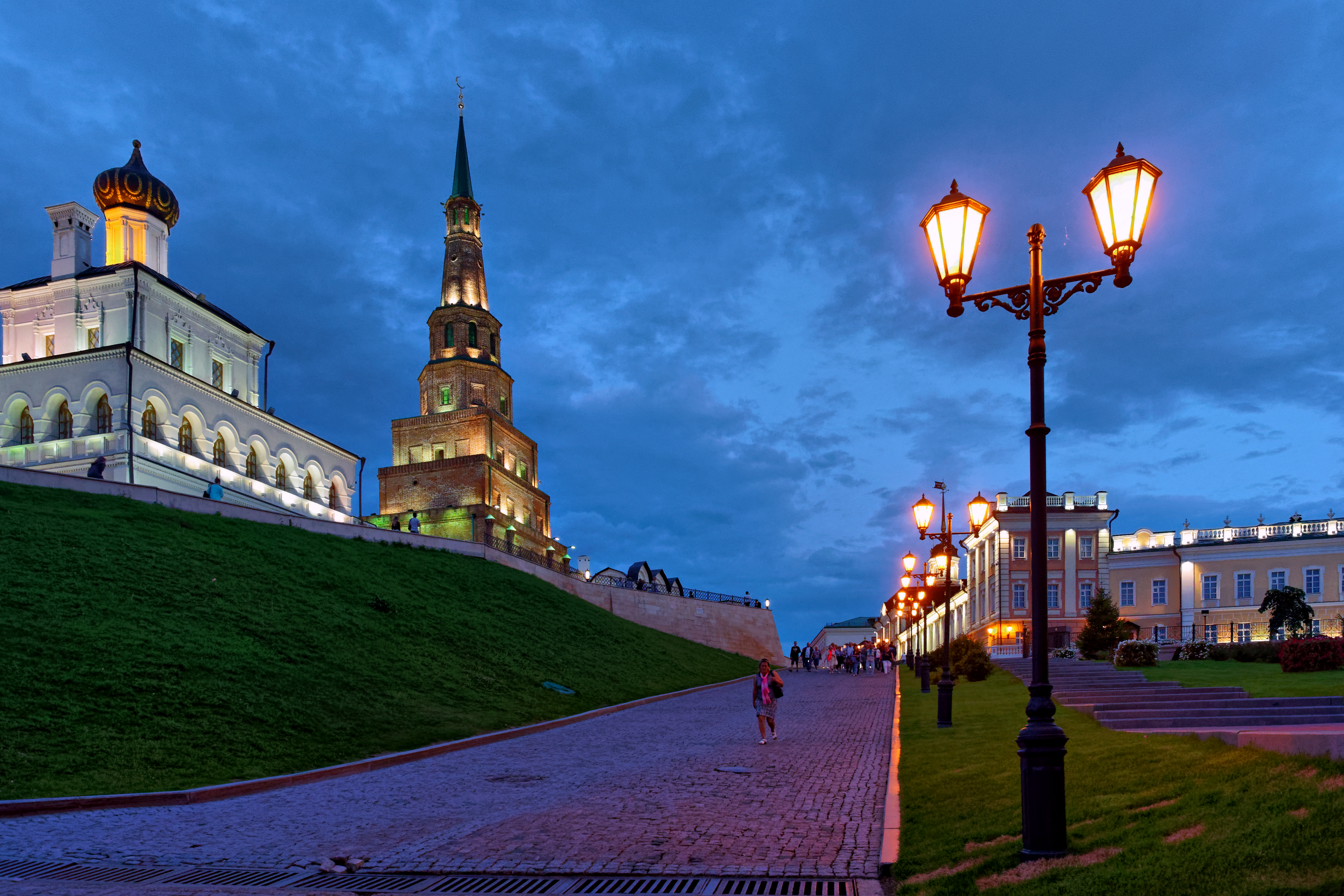
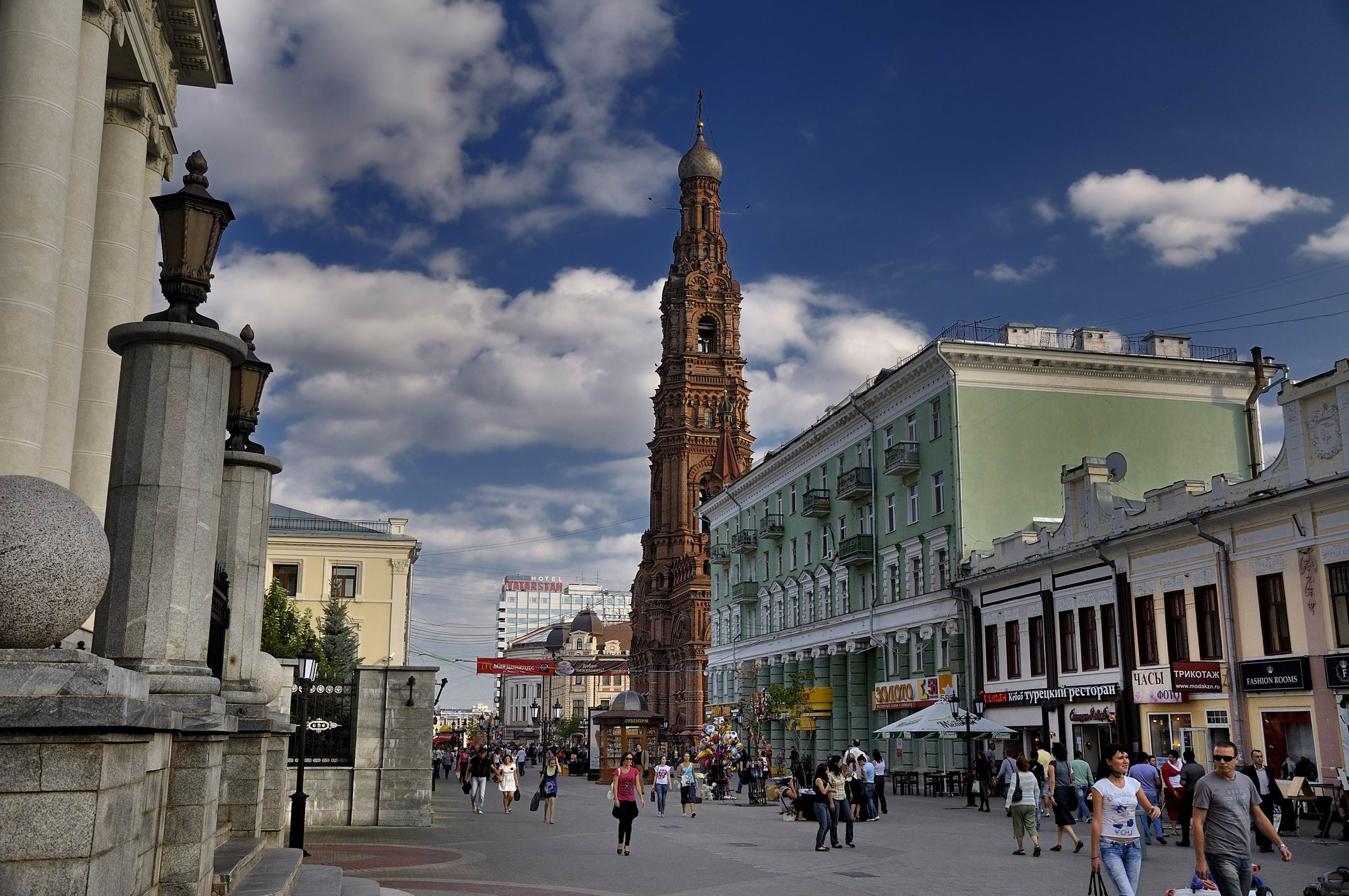
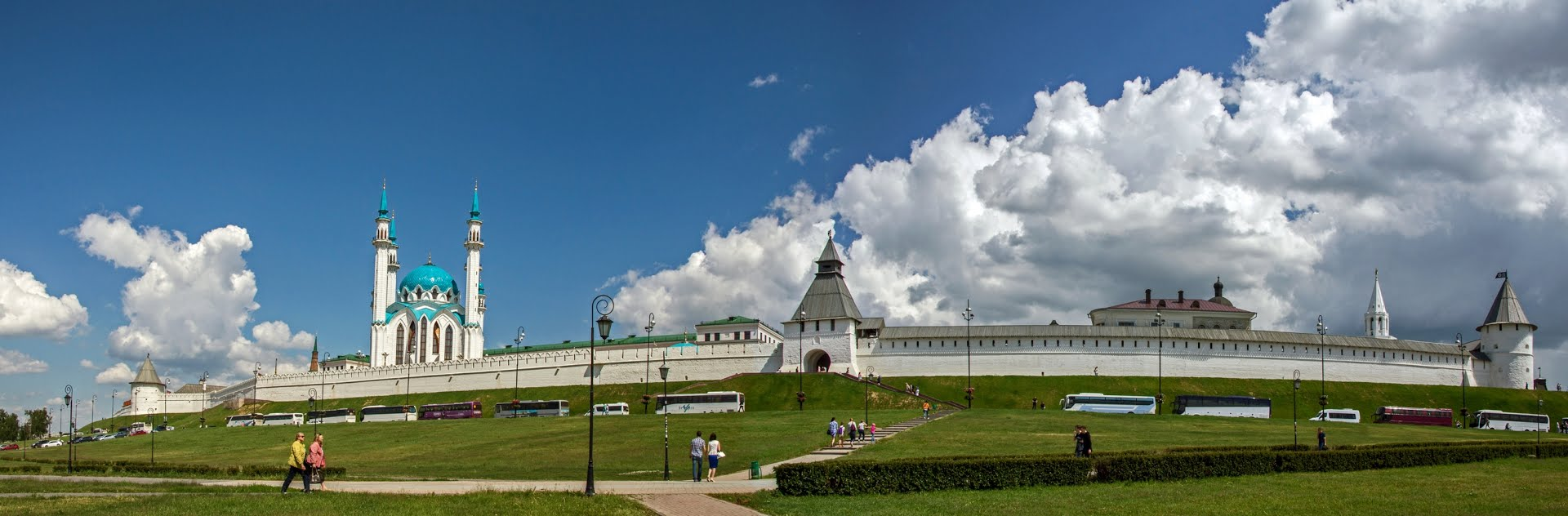
- Agricultural Palace and Palace Square Spasskaya Tower Kul Sharif Mosque Söyembikä Tower Epiphany Cathedral and Bauman Street Panoramic view of the Kazan Kremlin

- Flag Coat of arms
- Interactive map of Kazan
- Location in European Russia Location in Tatarstan Location in Russia Location in Europe
- Coordinates: 55°47′47″N 49°06′32″E
- Country: Russia
- Federal subject: Tatarstan
- Founded: AD 1005; 1021 years ago

Government
  - Body: City Duma
  - Mayor: Ilsur Metshin

Area
  - Total: 425.3 km^{2} (164.2 sq mi)
- Elevation: 60 m (200 ft)

Population (2010 Census)
  - Total: 1,143,535
  - Estimate (2025): 1,329,825 (+16.3%)
  - Rank: 8th in 2010
  - Density: 2,689/km^{2} (6,964/sq mi)

Administrative status
  - Subordinated to: City of republic significance of Kazan
  - Capital of: Republic of Tatarstan
  - Capital of: City of republic significance of Kazan

Municipal status
  - Urban okrug: Kazan Urban Okrug
  - Capital of: Kazan Urban Okrug
- Time zone: UTC+3 (MSK)
- Postal code: 420xxx
- Dialing code: +7 843
- OKTMO ID: 92701000001
- City Day: 30 August
- Website: kzn.ru

Kazan (Note: /kəˈzæn, -ˈzɑːn/ kə-ZAN, -ZAHN; Russian: Казань, Russian pronunciation: [kɐˈzanʲ]; Tatar: Казан, IPA: [qɑzan]) is the capital and largest city of Tatarstan, Russia. The city lies at the confluence of the Volga and the Kazanka rivers, covering an area of 425.3 square kilometres (164.2 square miles), with a population of over 1.3 million residents, and up to nearly 2 million residents in the greater metropolitan area. Kazan is the fifth-largest city in Russia, being the most populous city on the Volga and within the Volga Federal District.

Historically, Kazan was the capital of the Khanate of Kazan, and was conquered by Ivan the Terrible in the 16th century, at which point the city became a part of the Tsardom of Russia. The city was seized (and largely destroyed) during Pugachev's Rebellion (1773–'75), but was later rebuilt during the reign of Catherine the Great. In the following centuries, Kazan grew to become a major industrial, cultural and religious centre of Russia. In 1920, after the Russian SFSR became a part of the Soviet Union, Kazan became the capital of the Tatar Autonomous Soviet Socialist Republic (Tatar ASSR). Following the dissolution of the Soviet Union, Kazan remained the capital of the Republic of Tatarstan.

Kazan is renowned for its vibrant mix of Tatar and Russian cultures. In 2023, 4 million tourists visited Kazan, and Kazan Kremlin, a World Heritage Site, recorded more than 4.5 million visits. In April 2009, the Russian Patent Office granted Kazan the right to refer to itself as the "Third Capital of Russia". In 2009, Kazan was chosen as the "sports capital of Russia". Kazan hosted the 2013 Summer Universiade, and was one of the host cities of the 2018 FIFA World Cup. Kazan hosted the BRICS Games from 12 to 23 June 2024. Athletes competed in 27 sports.

== Etymology ==
A kazan (казан) is a cauldron in Tatar. Various stories attempt to explain the name; it perhaps describes the topographic basin around the city.

The 18th-century German scientist Johann Gottlieb Georgi recorded a tradition about the origin of the city's name:

The Kazan Tatars derive their name from the principal city of Kazan—a name originating from the Tatar word kazan (meaning "cauldron"). This name arose when a servant of the city's founder, Khan Altyn Bek, accidentally dropped a cauldron into the river now known as the Kazanka while drawing water for his master's ablutions.

== History ==
=== Middle Ages ===
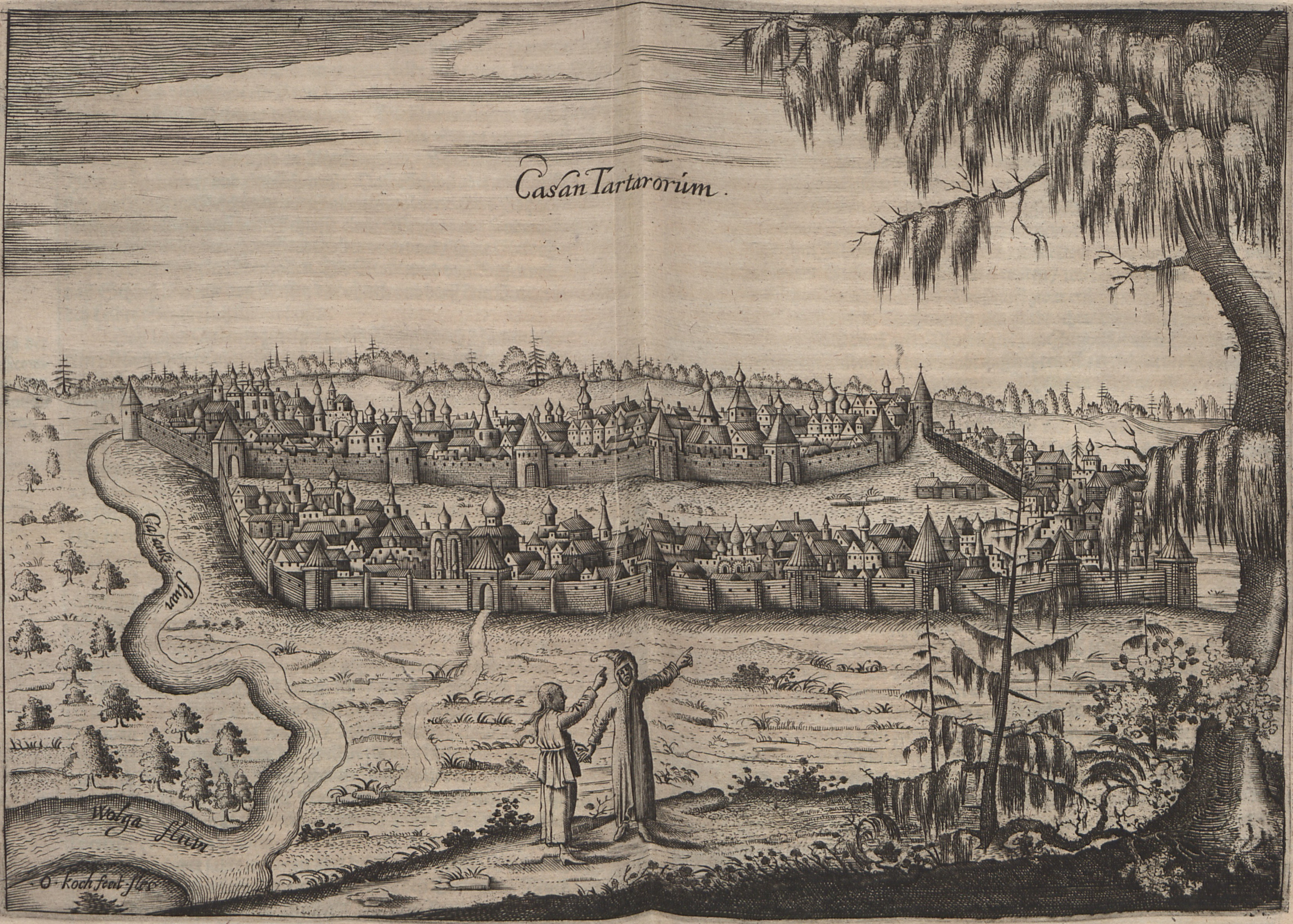
A view of Kazan by Adam Olearius (1656)

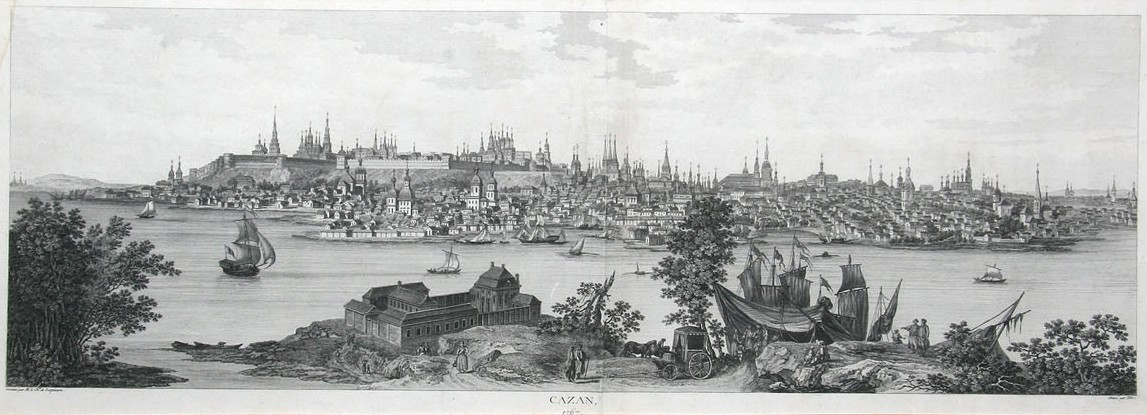
A view of the city (c. 1767)

According to the official version adopted today, the city was founded more than 1,000 years ago. The estimated date of the urban settlement on the site of Kazan is 1004–1005 AD. The reason for this dating was found during excavations in the Kazan Kremlin – a Czech coin, dated by the Board of St. Wenceslaus (presumably, coinage 929–930 years) and the earliest Czech coin, the remains of masonry and wooden city fence, handicrafts and utensils (Hungarian type lining, women's beads, etc.), as well as other artefacts with less obvious dating. According to official statements, experts from 20 cities of Russia and 22 countries of the world were involved in the study of findings related to the age of Kazan.

Kazan was a border post between Volga Bulgaria and two Finno-Ugric peoples—the Mari and Udmurt. Another question is where the citadel was built originally. Archaeological explorations have produced evidence of urban settlement in three parts of the modern city: in the Kremlin; in Bişbalta at the site of the modern Zilantaw monastery; and near the Kaban Lakes. The oldest of these seems to be the Kremlin.

The earliest chronicle mention of the first (old) Kazan is contained in the Rogozhsky Chronicle under 1391 in the description of the campaign of the ushkuiniks (Novgorodian pirates) who plundered and burned Žuketau and Kazan. It stood empty for 40 years. The new Kazan was founded at its mouth on the hill. This information is repeated in the Simeon Chronicle and the Moscow Code of 1479. The new Kazan was founded in 1438 as the capital of the Kazan Khanate by Ulugh Muhammad. Sources say that Kazan was founded by Perekop refugees (Tatars) from Crimea.

In 1438, the Bulgar fortress Kazan (Iske-Kazan) was captured by the ousted Golden Horde Khan Ulugh Muhammad, who killed the local Prince Swan and moved the fortress to a modern place (according to Russian Chronicles). The city became the capital of the Khanate of Kazan. The city Bazaar, Taş Ayaq (stone foot) has become the most important shopping centre in the region, especially for furniture. Handicraft production also flourished, as the city gained a reputation for its leather and gold products, as well as the wealth of its palaces and mosques.

Kazan had trade relations with Moscow, Crimea, Turkey, and other regions.

=== Russian Tsardom period ===
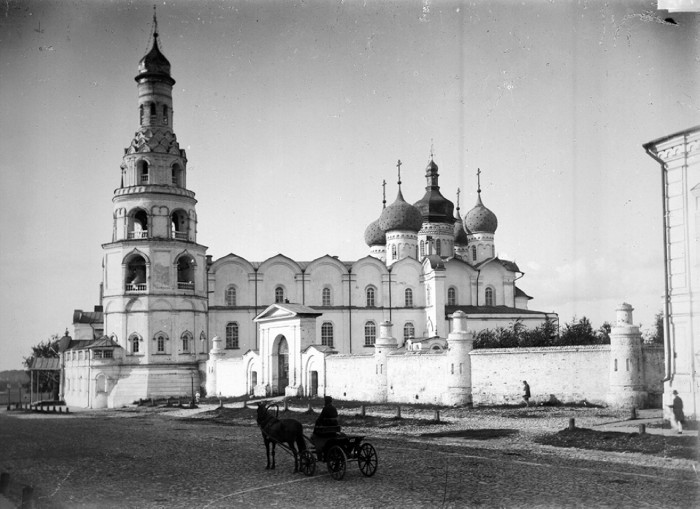
Annunciation Cathedral of Kazan Kremlin (1561–1562)

As a result of the siege of Kazan in 1552, Tsar Ivan the Terrible conquered the city. During the subsequent governorship of Alexander Gorbaty-Shuysky, most of the Kazan's Tatar residents were forcibly Christianised or deported, and mosques and palaces were ruined. The surviving Tatar population was moved to a place 50 km (31 mi) away from the city and this place was forcibly settled by Russian farmers and soldiers. Tatars in the Russian service were settled in the Tatar Bistäse settlement near the city's wall. Later Tatar merchants and handicraft masters also settled there. During this period, Kazan was largely destroyed as a result of several great fires. After one of them in 1579, the icon Our Lady of Kazan was discovered in the city.

In the early 17th century, at the beginning of the Time of Troubles in Russia, the Tsardom of Kazan declared independence under the leadership of voyvoda Nikanor Shulgin with the help of the Russian population, but this independence was suppressed by Kuzma Minin in 1612.

=== Russian Empire period ===
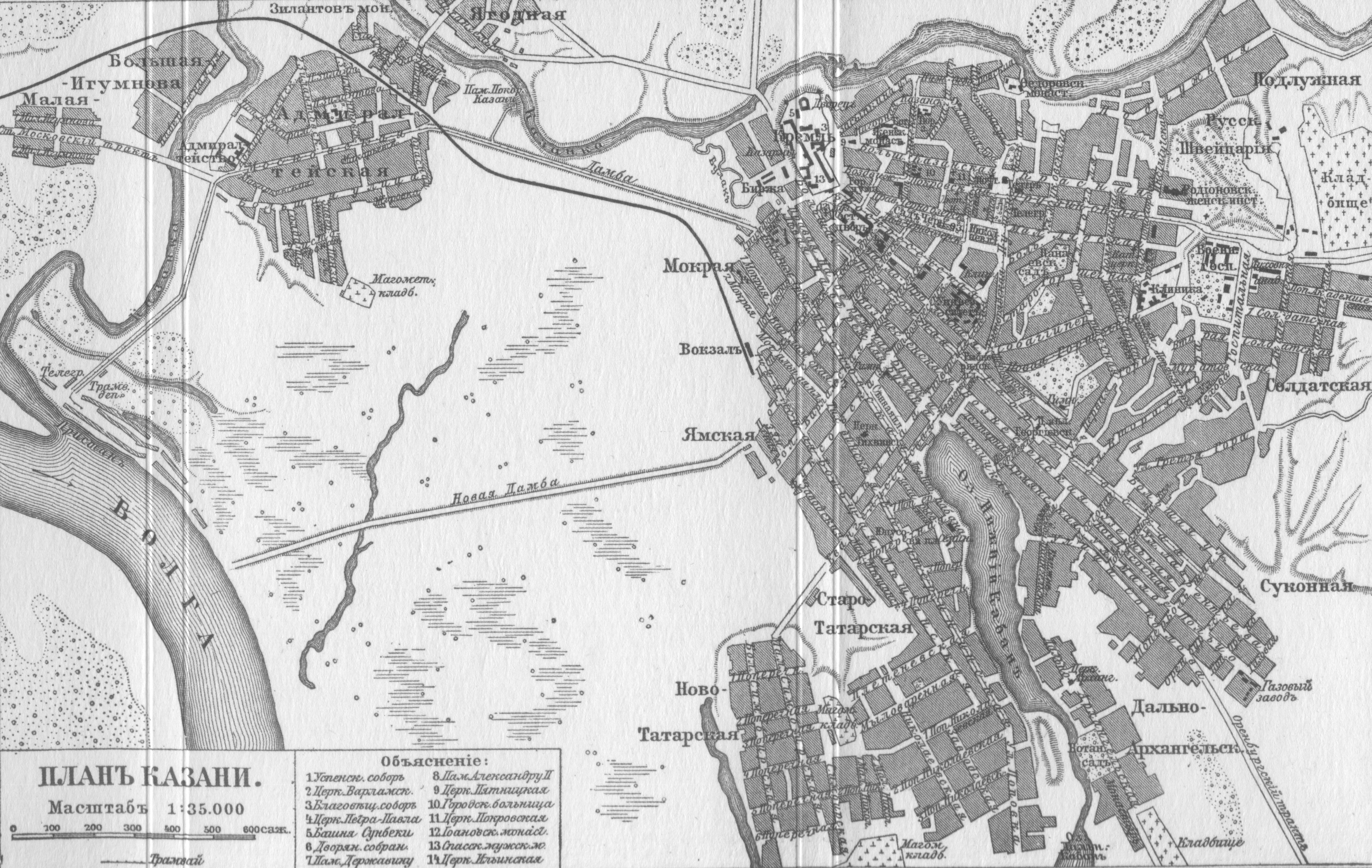
Kazan city map from the 19th century, Russian edition

In 1708, the Tsardom of Kazan was abolished, and Kazan became the seat of Kazan Governorate. After Peter the Great's visit, the city became a centre of shipbuilding for the Caspian fleet. The major Russian poet Gavrila Derzhavin was born in Kazan in 1743, the son of a poor country squire of Tatar ancestry though himself having a thoroughly Russian identity.

Before the building of modern dams, low-lying areas were regularly flooded in April and May. Kazan suffered major fires in 1595, 1672, 1694, 1742, 1749, 1757, 1774, 1815, and 1842.

Kazan was largely destroyed in 1774 as a result of Pugachev's Rebellion, an uprising by border troops and peasants led by the Don Cossack ataman (Captain) Yemelyan Pugachev, but the city, formerly largely of timber construction, was soon afterwards rebuilt, using stone and according to a grid pattern plan, during the reign of Catherine the Great. Catherine also decreed that mosques could again be built in Kazan, the first being Marjani Mosque.

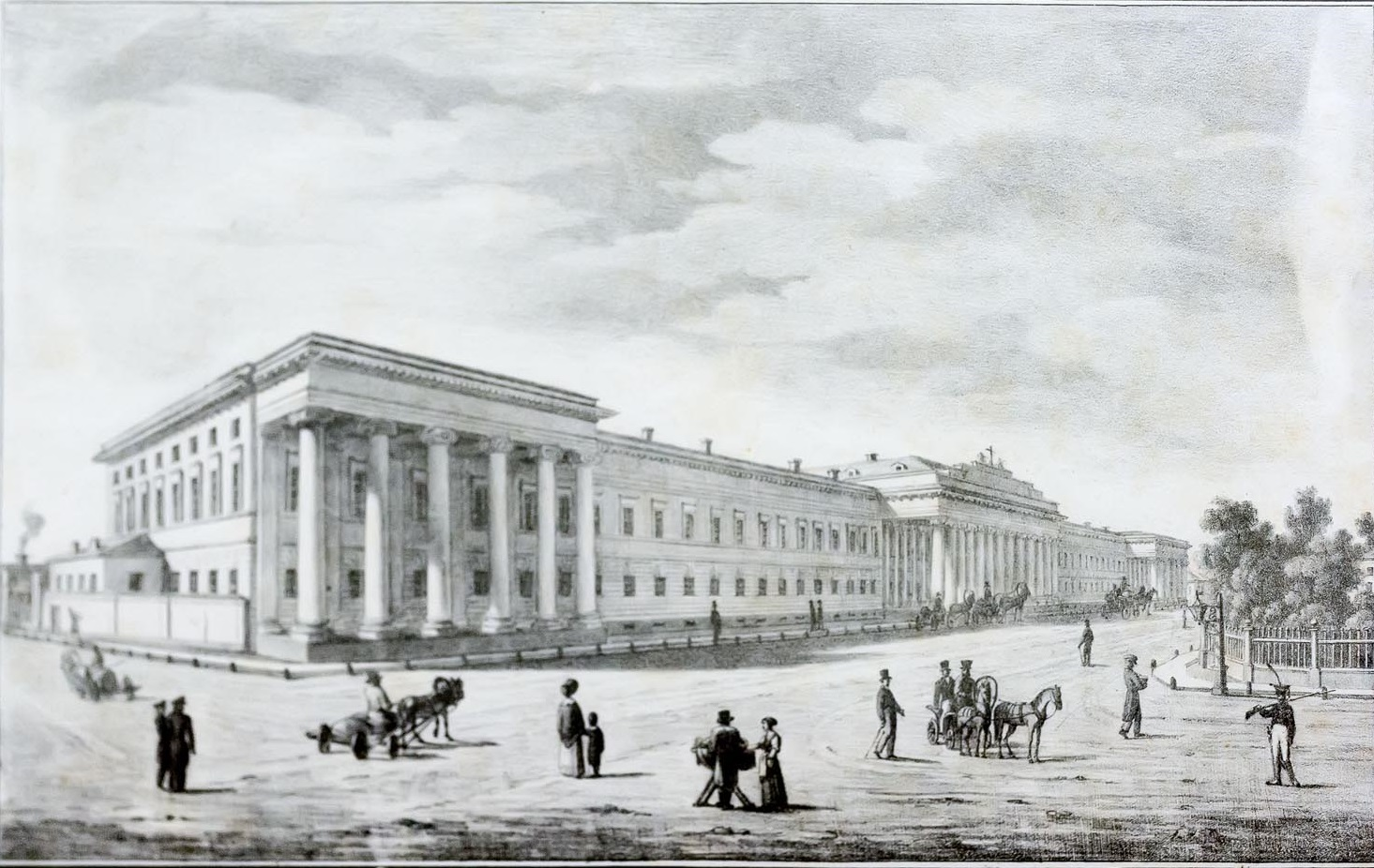
Kazan State University (1832)

At the beginning of the 19th century Kazan State University and printing press were founded by Alexander I. It became an important centre for Oriental Studies in Russia. The Qur'an was first printed in Kazan in 1801. Kazan became an industrial centre and peasants migrated there to join its industrial workforce. In 1875, a horse tramway appeared; 1899 saw the installation of a tramway. After the Russian Revolution of 1905, Tatars were allowed to revive Kazan as a Tatar cultural centre. The first Tatar theatre and the first Tatar newspaper appeared.

=== Soviet period ===
In 1917, Kazan became one of the October Revolution centres. In 1918, Kazan was the capital of the Idel-Ural State, which was suppressed by the Bolshevik government. In the Kazan Operation of August 1918, it was briefly occupied by Czechoslovak Legions. In 1920, Kazan became the centre of the Tatar Autonomous Soviet Socialist Republic. After the Treaty of Rapallo (1922) until 1933, the German and the Russian army together operated the Kama tank school in Kazan.

Those who died in prison or were executed were buried in the Arkhangelskoe cemetery. In 1998 an elaborate memorial complex was created in their memory.

During World War II, many industrial plants and factories to the west were relocated in Kazan, making the city a centre of the military industry, producing tanks and planes. After the war Kazan consolidated as an industrial and scientific centre. In 1979, the city's population reached one million.

=== Modern period ===
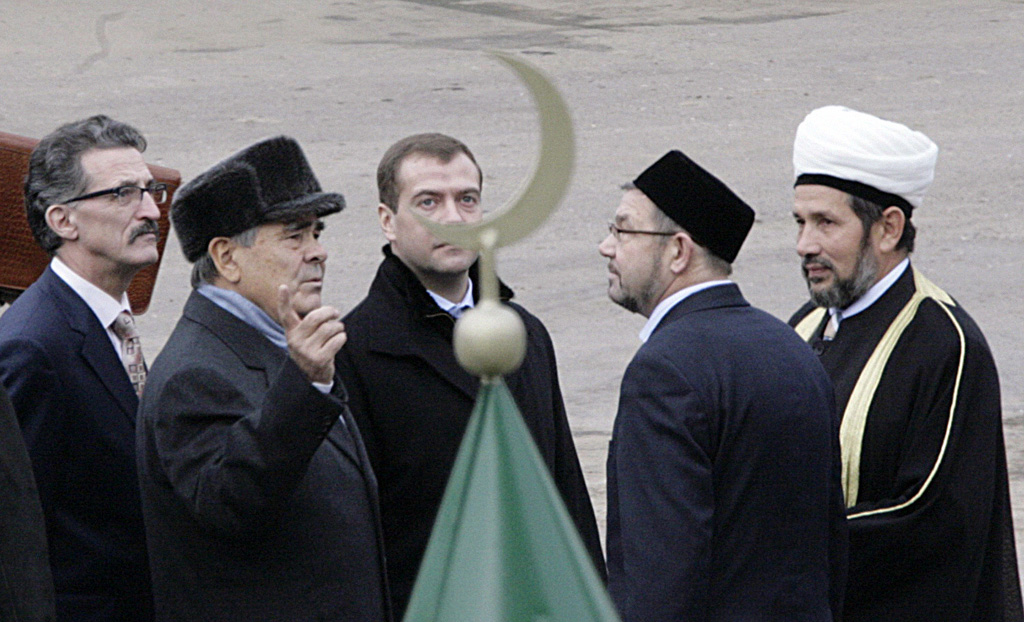
Dmitry Medvedev visits Kazan (November 2007)

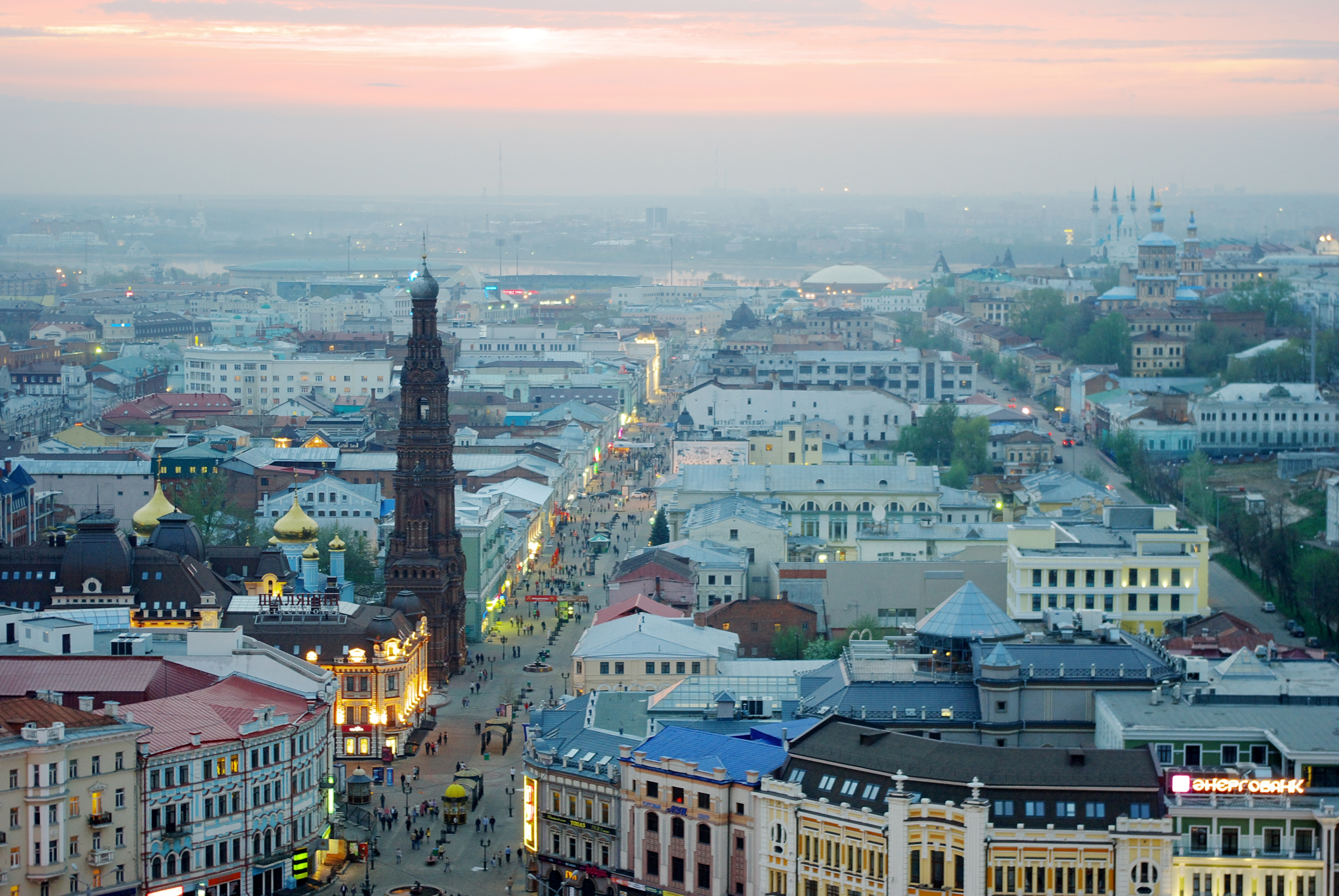
Bauman Street

In the late 1980s and in the 1990s, after the dissolution of the Soviet Union, Kazan again became the centre of Tatar culture and identity, and separatist tendencies intensified. With the return of capitalism, Kazan became one of the most important centres of the Russian Federation. The city went from 10th to 8th position in population ranking of Russian cities. In the early 2000s, the city earned the right to host both the 2013 Summer Universiade and 2018 FIFA World Cup.

==== Millennium of Kazan ====
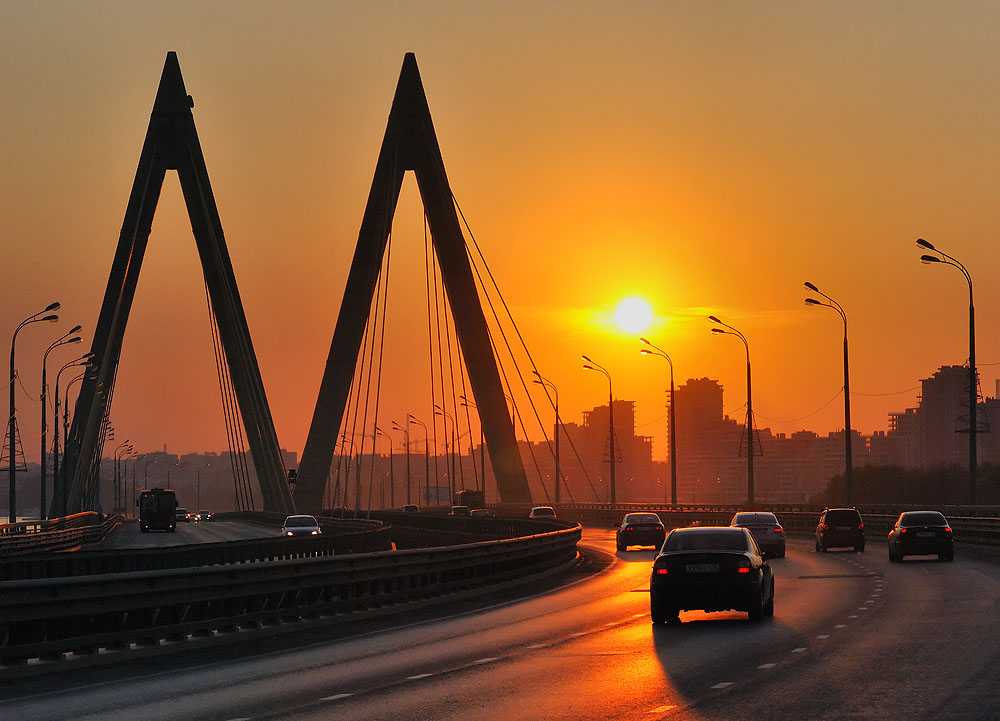
Millennium Bridge

Since 2000, the city has been undergoing a total renovation. The historical centre including the Kremlin was rebuilt, however a large number of the city's historical districts were completely demolished in the renovation. Kazan celebrated its millennium in 2005, after a city-organised historical commission settled on 1005 as the official year of the city's founding. During the millennium celebrations, one of the largest mosque in Russia, Kul Sharif, was dedicated in the Kazan Kremlin, the holiest copy of Our Lady of Kazan was returned to the city, the Millennium Bridge was inaugurated that year, and the Kazan Metro began operation. The government of the Russian Federation released the Medal "In Commemoration of the 1000th Anniversary of Kazan".

In 2010, for the preparations to the 2013 Universiade, Kazan began even more renovation by modernising its airport, fixing the streets, enhancing public transport, and adopting Russian, English, and Tatar languages in all transportation, large stores, and shopping centres.

In 2021, a teenager killed nine people in a school mass shooting and bombing.

In December 2024, Russian leader Vladimir Putin threatened to bring more "destruction" to Ukraine in retaliation for a Ukrainian drone attack on Kazan during the Russo-Ukrainian War.

== Heraldry ==
The historical symbol of Kazan is the mythical dragon-like creature Zilant, often mentioned in legends. For example, when numerous snakes and reptiles severely hampered the development of the city, the hunters went in search of the King of snakes and defeated him, according to another version, the residents of the city bought off the giant snake with gold, after which all the snakes left the city. Another legend says that the giant dragon-like serpent always guarded the Khan's treasures, and that it still protects the hidden wealth before the capture of the city in the secret caves. Historically, it is true that snakes were once numerous in the Kazan region, but then their number has decreased dramatically. The first official coat of arms of Kazan was approved on 18 October 1781 and was described as "black snake under the crown of gold, Kazan, red wings, white field". In 1926, the country introduced a ban on such heraldry. In the 1980s, the coat of arms of Kazan began to reappear, and in the 1990s Kazan Zilant in various styles began to appear in print media. Modern graphics of the emblem and flag appeared in 2005—in a silver field on the green earth a black dragon with red wings and tongue, with gold paws, claws and eyes, topped with a gold crown. The shield is crowned with a Kazan cap. According to the traditions of heraldry, the dragon symbolises power, wisdom and invincibility, the earth—life and wealth, the crown-development, and the cap above the shield-the capital of the city.

== Administrative and municipal status ==
Kazan is the capital of Tatarstan. Within the framework of administrative divisions, it is incorporated as the city of republic significance of Kazan—an administrative unit with the status equal to that of the districts. As a municipal division, the city of republic significance of Kazan is incorporated as Kazan Urban Okrug.

=== City divisions ===
Districts of Kazan

Kazan is divided into seven districts:

No.	District	Population	Area (km^{2})
1	Aviastroitelny	111,405	38.91
2	Vakhitovsky	86,202	25.82
3	Kirovsky	109,125	108.79
4	Moskovsky	130,537	38.81
5	Novo-Savinovsky	202,997	20.66
6	Privolzhsky	227,755	115.77
7	Sovetsky	275,514	167.00

== Economy ==
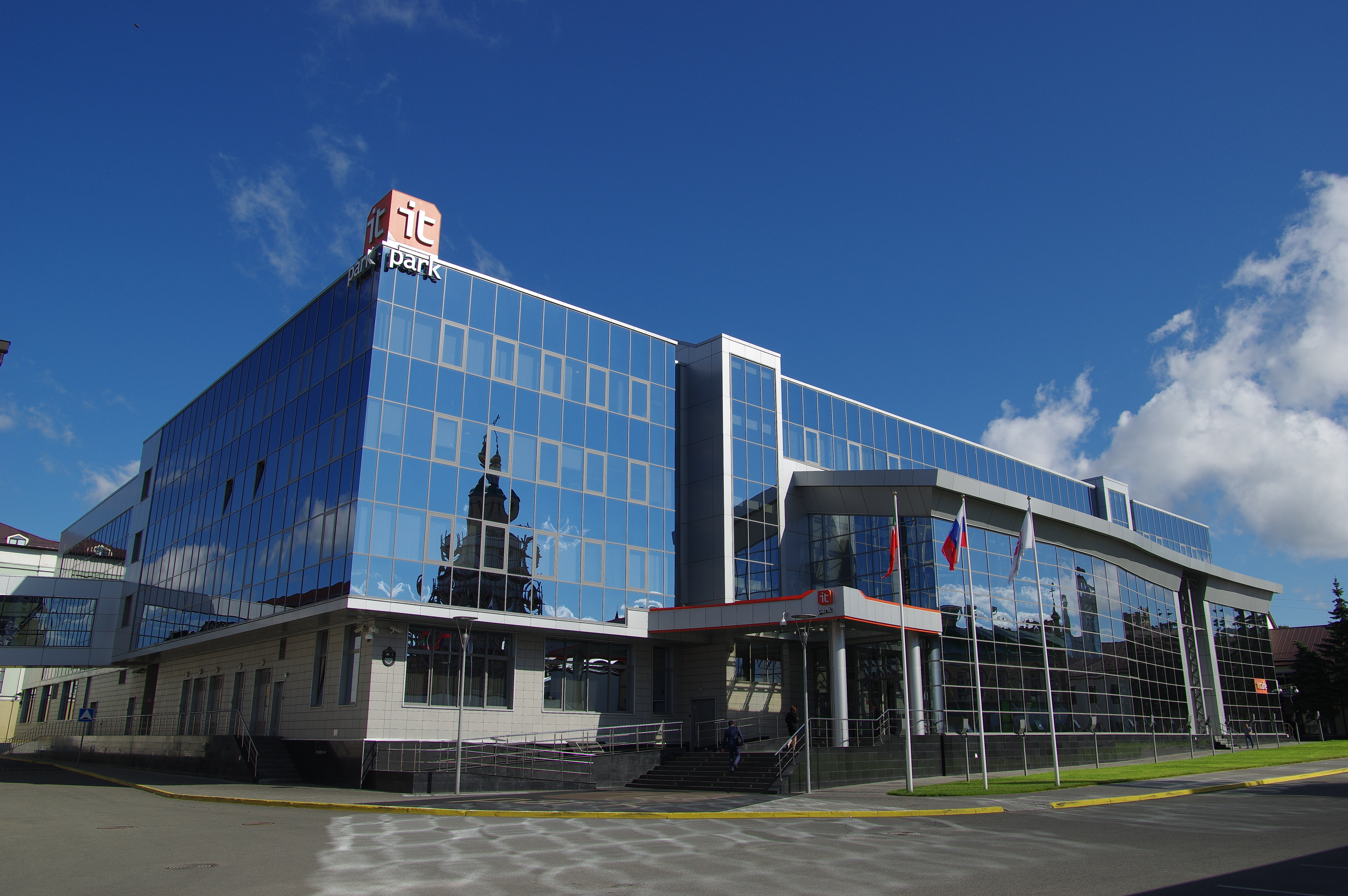
Kazan IT-Park

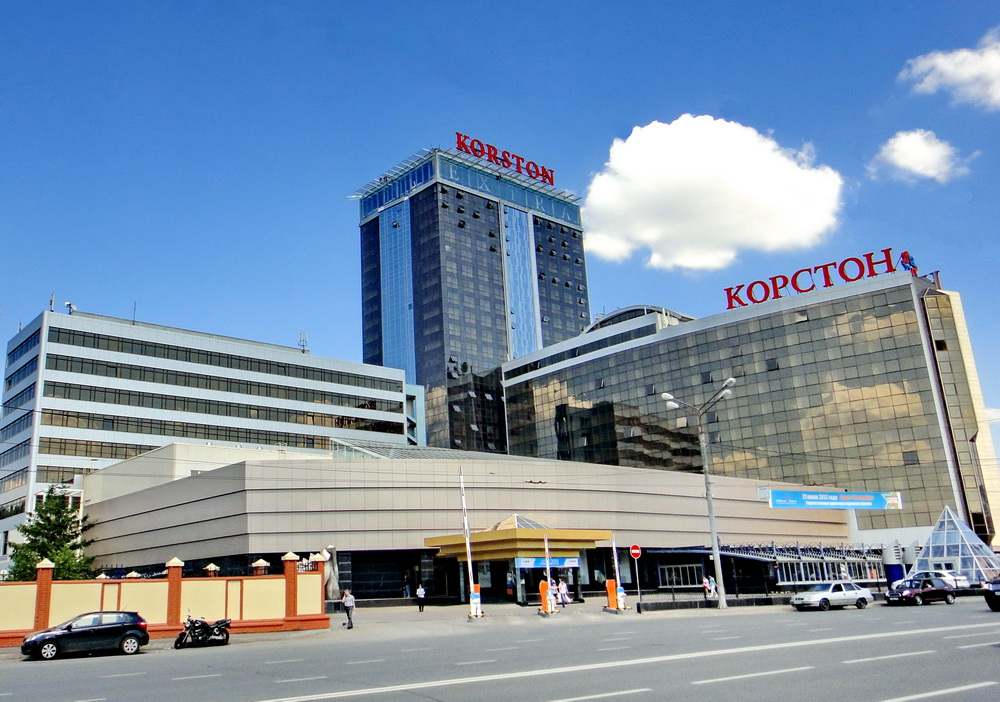
Korston-Kazan with local World Trade Centre

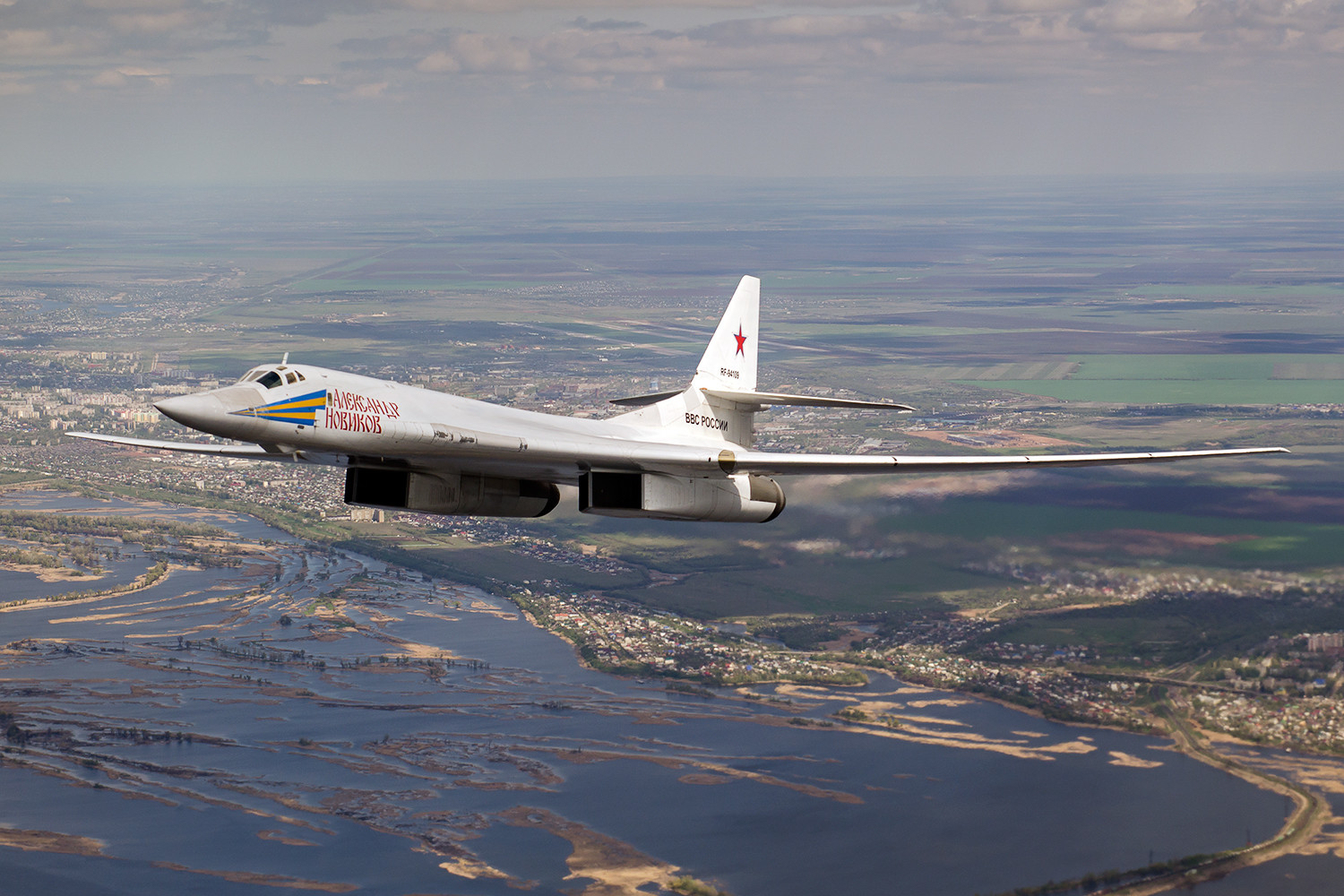
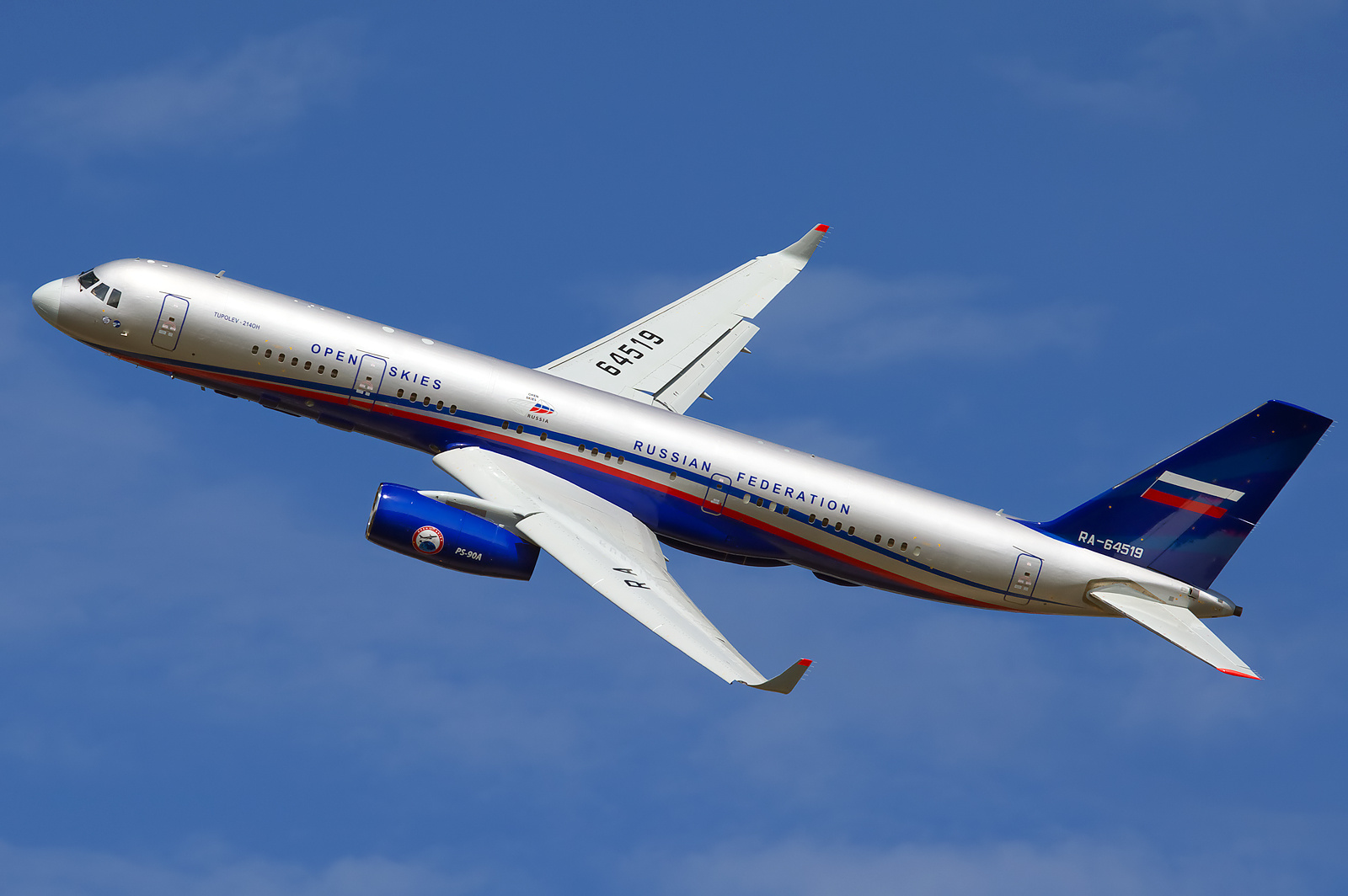
Airplanes built by Kazan Aircraft Production Association
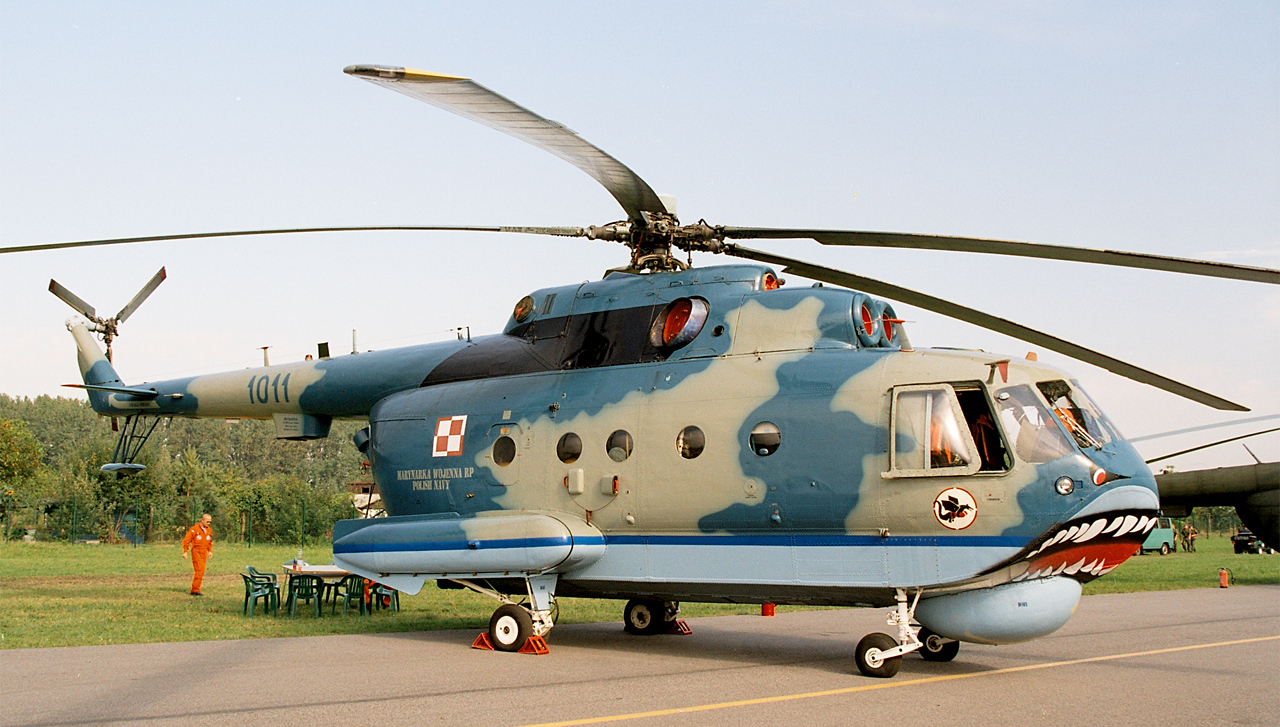
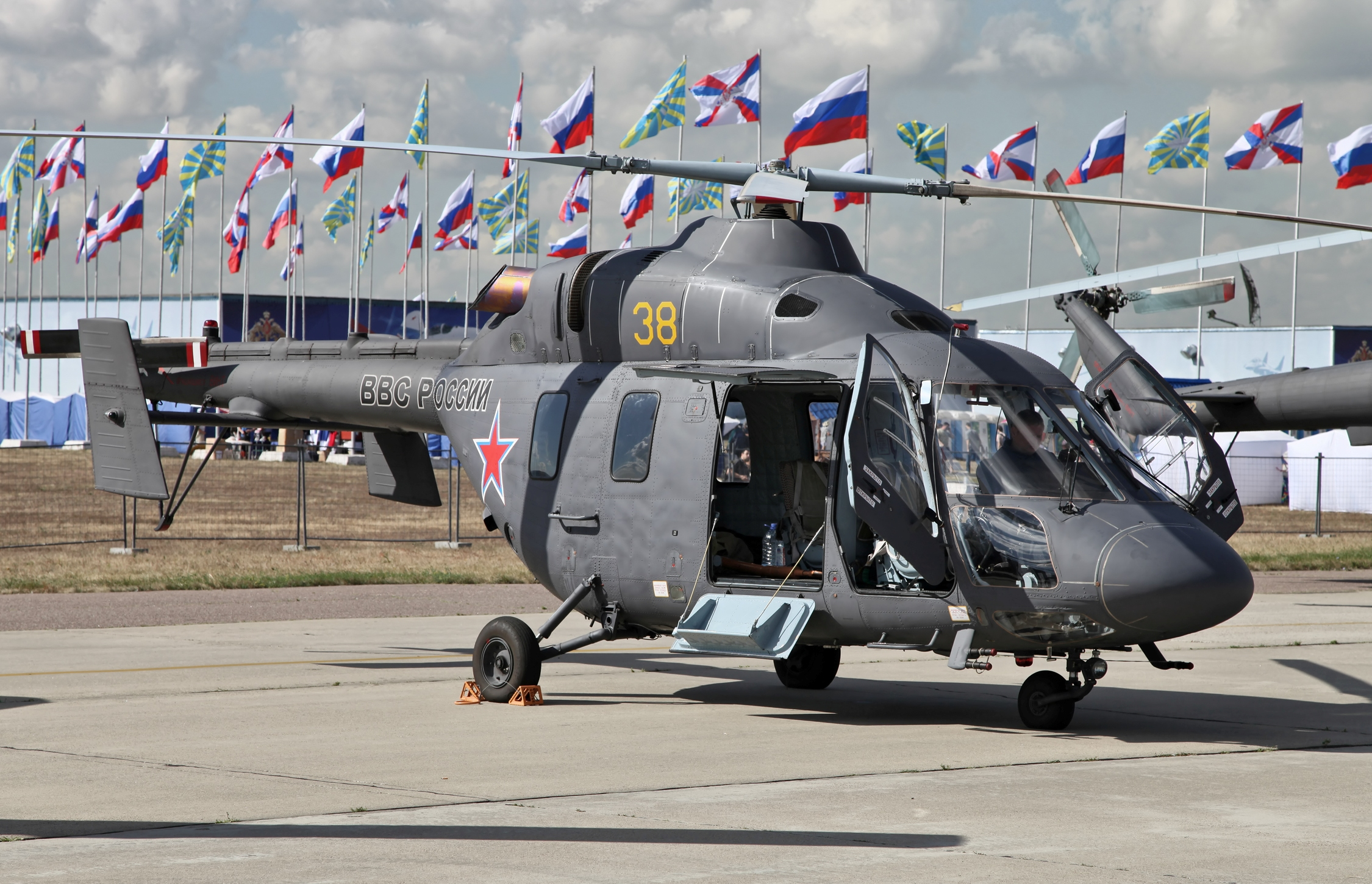
Helicopter built by Kazan Helicopters

Kazan is one of the largest industrial and financial centres of Russia, and a leading city of the Volga economic region in construction and accumulated investment. The city's gross regional product was 380 billion rubles in 2011.

Total banking capital of Kazan banks is third in Russia. The main industries of the city are: mechanical engineering, chemical, petrochemical, light and food industries. An innovative economy is represented by the largest IT-park in Russia which is one of the largest of its kind among Eastern European science parks. Kazan ranked 186th in Mercer's 1999 Worldwide Quality of Living Survey.

=== Investments ===
In 2011, city organisations and businesses attracted more than 87 billion rubles for economy and social sphere development. This was 44% more than in 2010. In 2014, businesses attracted 86 billion rubles. Most of them have been implemented in the real economy sector.

Because of the unstable economic situation within the country, there was a decrease of investment rates in 2015 and—according to the statistics of the first part of the year—it composed 51.7 billion rubles.

There are head offices of six companies that are in the top 500 in terms of revenues in Russia. The total area of city business centres is 330,000 m^{2}.

Innovative economy in Kazan is represented by the biggest IT-park in Russia and also the biggest technical park in Europe. The only online platform for governmental trade except the Moscow one is operated in Kazan. During the post-Soviet period Kazan was the leader in terms of house construction in the Volga region, and now it holds the position and implements the Republican program of liquidation of dilapidated housing which was unique for Russia.

According to Forbes, Kazan was ranked 15th among the "Best cities for business in Russia" of 2010. In 2012, Kazan ranked 6th in the quality of city environment rating, which was made by the Russian Federation Ministry of Regional Development, Russian Alliance of Engineers, Federal Construction Agency, Federal Service of Supervision of Consumer Protection and Welfare and Moscow Federal University.

== Transportation ==
=== Bus ===
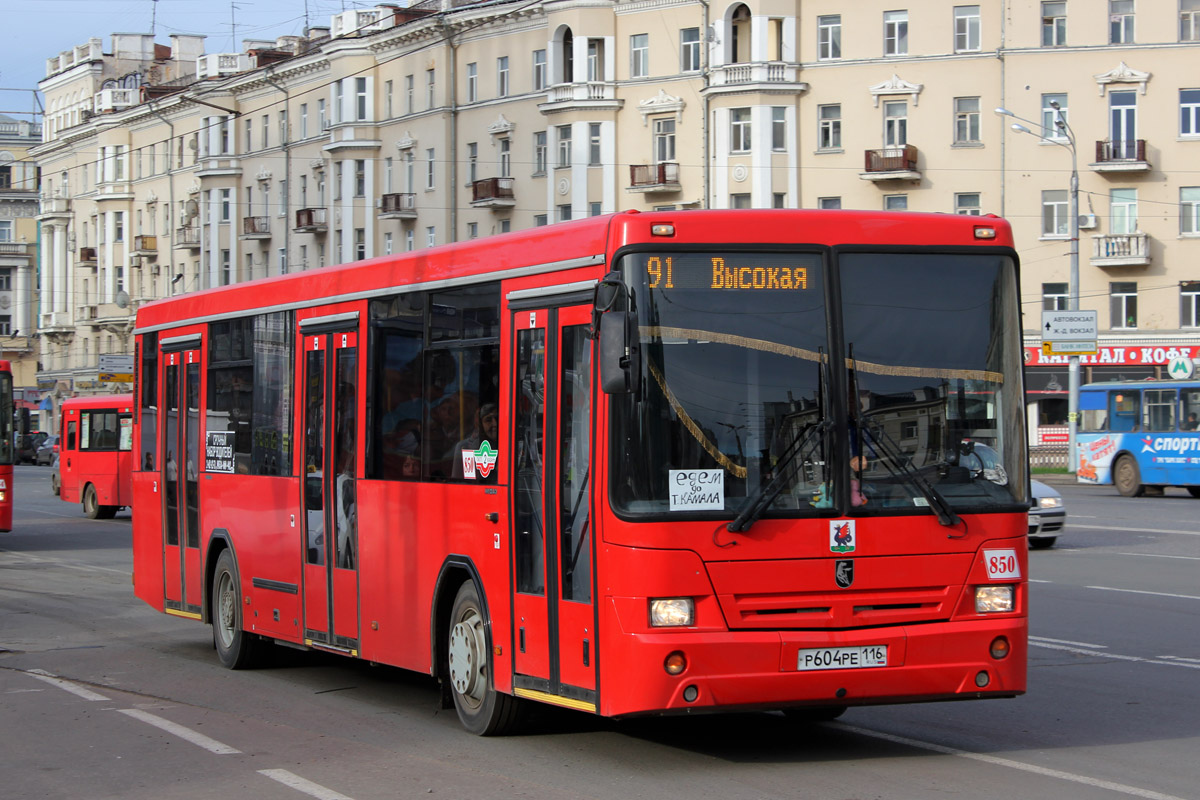
A NefAZ bus on Tukay Square

The first bus routes in Kazan came to use in 1925. The bus is the most popular type of public transport in Kazan: in 2016, it carried about 74% of passengers. As of 2017, there are about 62 bus routes in the city, with a total length of more than 1.2 thousand km. The total number of buses operating on city routes is 840. The movement of all buses is monitored using an automated control system based on satellite navigation. Any Internet user can track the movement of buses.

Kazan's bus system was totally renovated in 2007. 62 routes have an aggregate length of 1,981 km (1,231 mi). All 1,444 buses are coloured red. Half of the buses are imported, produced by Golden Dragon, Higer, MAZ, Yutong, and Hyundai. Other buses are mostly Russian made NefAZ.

As of January 2024, the fare is 42 rubles in cash or 38 rubles by credit card and by a special transport card. On the routes, conductors are involved and, in addition to paying for cash (with a higher fare), there are general civil (with different tariff plans for replenishment, including time passes and an "electronic wallet"), as well as preferential electronic transport cards.

=== Tram ===
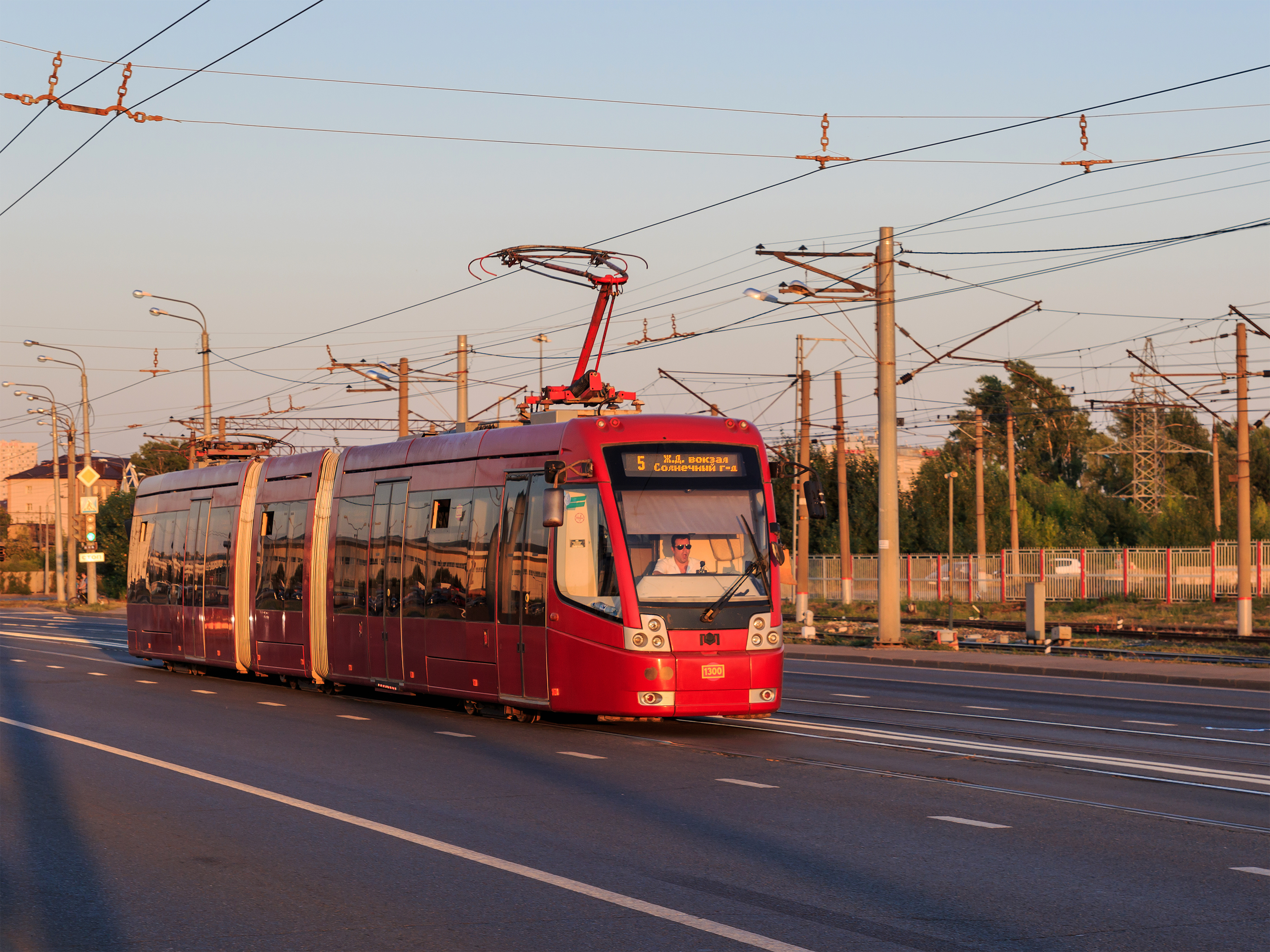
An AKSM-843 tram passing by the Kirovskaya Dike

Kazan's tram system is one of the oldest tram systems in Russia, opened on 20 November 1899. The tram system in Kazan consists of eight operating routes, one of which is a historical excursion route between the railway station and river port. The daily output is 87 trams. Most of the tram lines are laid along the axis of the main streets, most of them on a dedicated track, fenced with side stones. The tram in the city centre was largely removed in the 2000s due to the fight against traffic jams on narrow streets; some routes turned out to be unprofitable after the optimisation of the transport scheme in 2006–2007.

In 2009–2020, the reconstruction of tram tracks on the main highways was carried out, as well as the construction of four new tram lines, which made it possible to launch circular tram routes No. 5/5a with an accelerated mode of movement in 2012-2020 along the sections of the Big Kazan Ring.

All trams are equipped with autoinformators. Announcements are broadcast in three languages (Russian, Tatar, English); for this reason, announcements are played for a very long time (up to one and a half minutes). As of 2024, the fare is 42 rubles in cash or 38 rubles for an electronic card. On the routes, conductors are involved and, in addition to paying for cash (with a higher fare), there are general civil (with different tariff plans for replenishment, including time passes and an "electronic wallet"), as well as preferential electronic transport cards.

=== Trolleybus ===
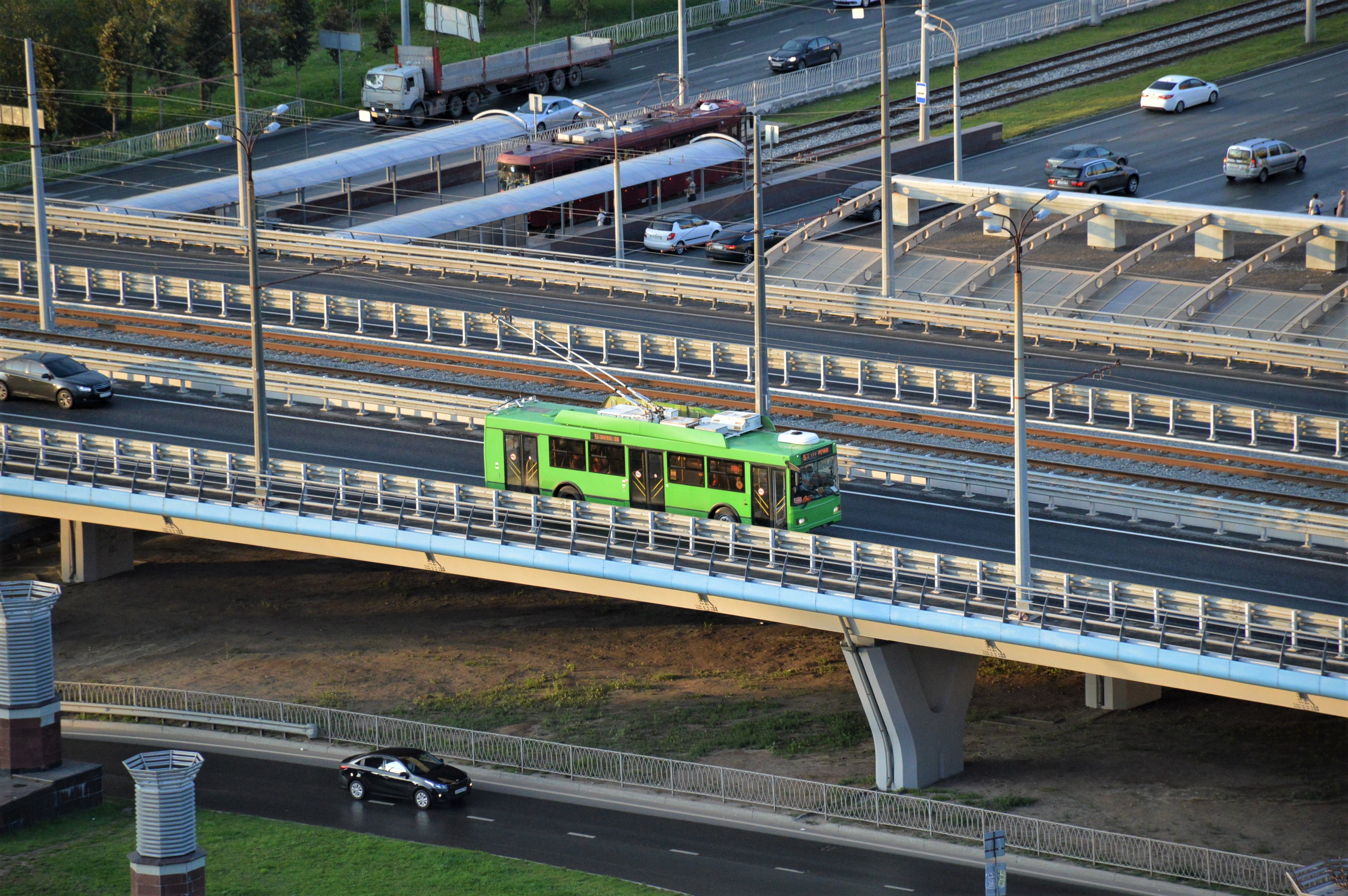
Trolleybus passing by the overpass on Richard Sorge Street

Kazan's trolleybus system is one of the oldest in Russia. Operation opened on 27 November 1948. In recent years, it continues to develop: new lines were launched, built and planned, while some new trolleybus lines replaced the removed tram lines. Two trolleybus depots operate a fleet of over 200 trolleybuses, all of which are green, and serve 10 routes with a total length of 359.9 km (223.63 mi). A major overhaul (CWR) of old trolleybuses was carried out at the Kazan aircraft plant KAPO for the city at the beginning of the 21st century.

As of June 2024, the fare is 42 rubles in cash or 38 rubles by electronic transportation card or debit card. On the routes, conductors are involved and, in addition to paying for cash (with a higher fare), there are general civil (with different tariff plans for replenishment, including time passes and an "electronic wallet"), as well as preferential electronic transport cards.

All trolleybuses are monitored by an automated control system based on satellite navigation. Any Internet user can track the movement of trolleybuses.

=== Metro ===
A single-line Kazan Metro (running north to south-east) opened on 27 August 2005. As of February 2024, the Kazan Metro had eleven stations and crossed the Kazanka River, with a second metro line being built.

=== Railways ===
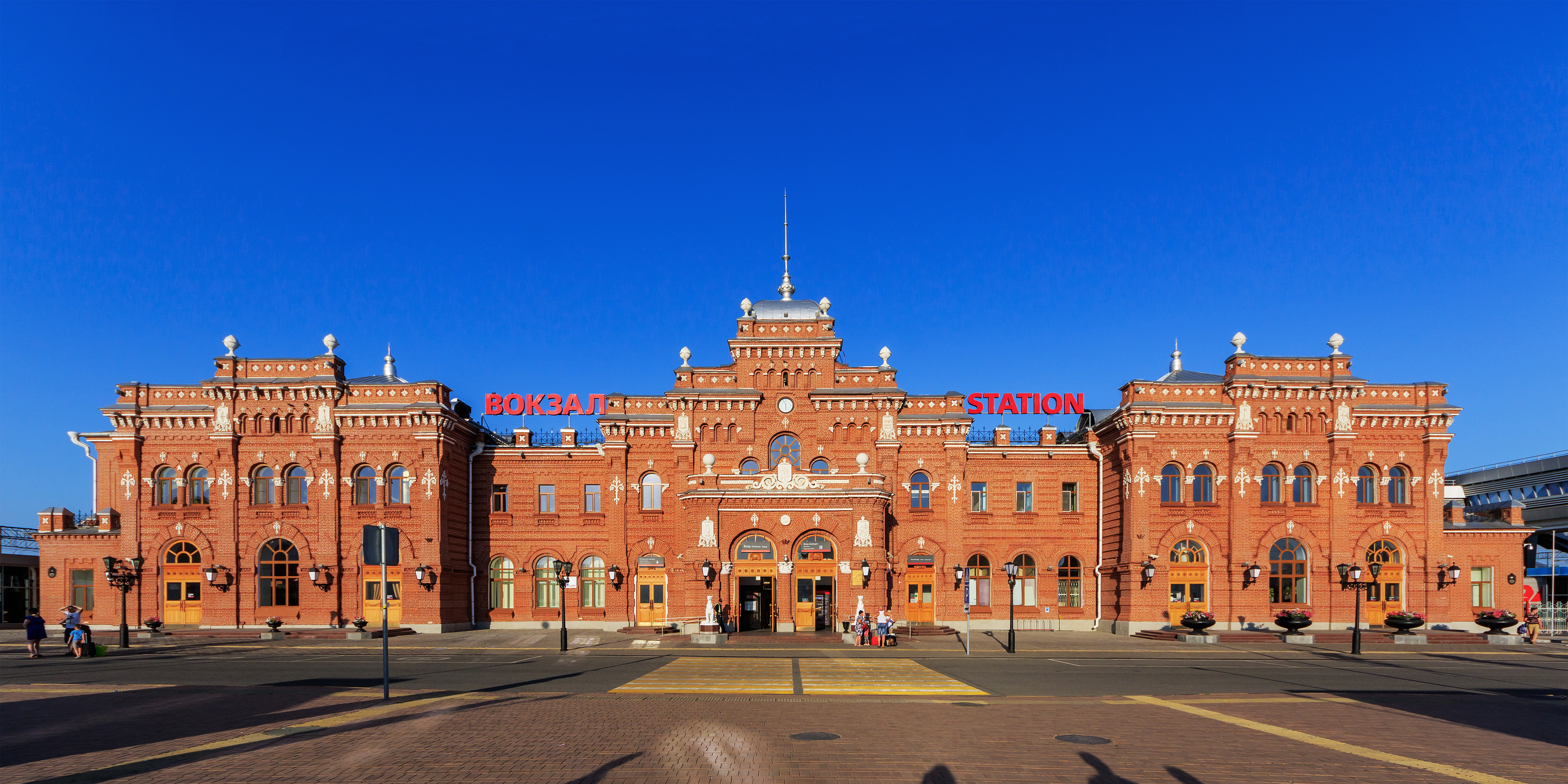
Kazan–Passazhirskaya, opened in 1894

Kazan is connected with Moscow, Ulyanovsk, Yoshkar-Ola and Yekaterinburg by train.

The main railway station Kazan–Passazhirskaya is located in the city centre and includes a main building (built in 1896), a commuter trains terminal, a ticket office building and some other technical buildings. The station serves 36 intercity trains, and more than eight million passengers per annum. A second terminus, Kazan-2, is situated in the northern part of the city. Kazan also has 19 platforms for commuter trains. Within the city are 24 railway stations and stopping platforms.

=== Public transit ===
Payment is received in cash, by dedicated travel cards and by banking cards. One ride fee is 36 rubles in cash or by banking card and 35 rubles by travel card. There are various plans for different types of travel which reduce single ride fees. There are no zoning tariffs within the city.

=== Cycling ===
On 1 July 2013, the Veli'k bicycle sharing system was launched in Kazan. In total, the system includes seven self-service bicycle docking stations, and a total fleet of 100 bikes. The service is open to anyone from 16 years of age. There are three types of subscription – monthly, weekly and daily. During the season from late spring to mid-autumn, residents and guests of Kazan typically use the service more than 15,000 times. In 2015, the first cycle routes on separate bike lanes were opened in the city centre; further expansion is planned throughout the city.

=== Waterways ===
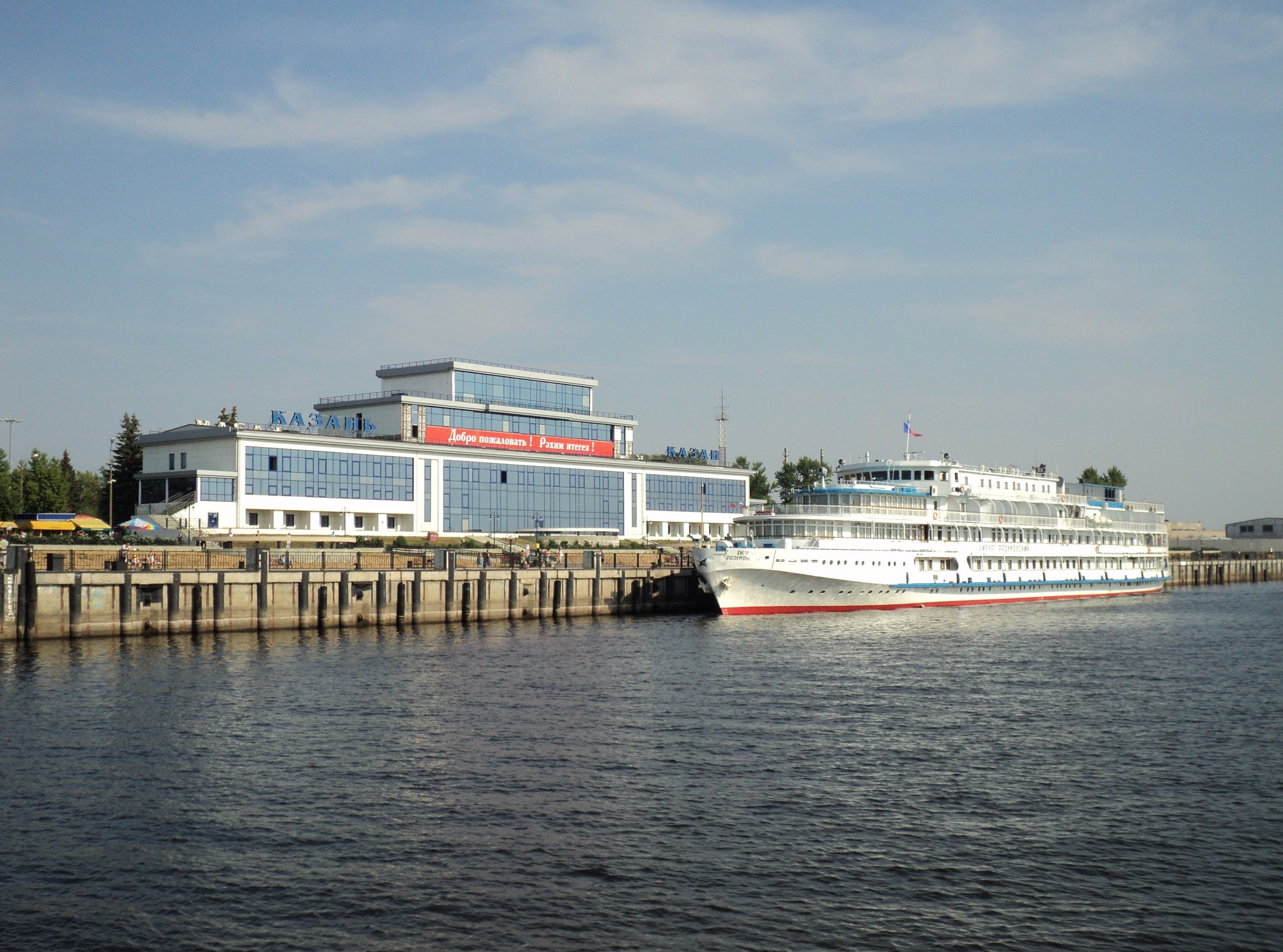
Kazanskiy Rechnoy Port

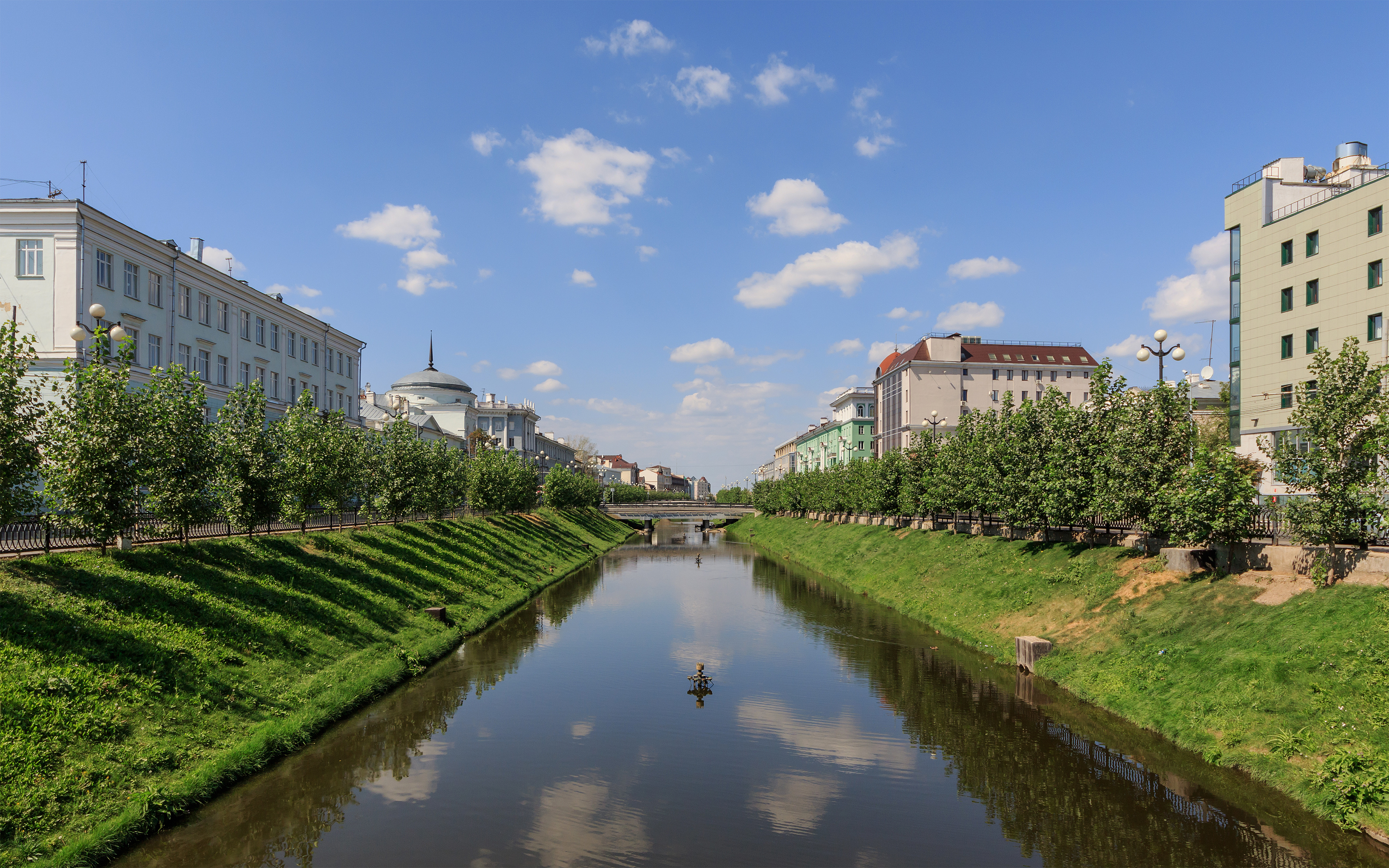
The Bolaq Canal

Kazan's river port is one of the largest on the Volga River, thanks to the system of canals from which Kazan is sometimes called the "port of five seas". The main building of the river station was built together with the new river port by the early 1960s and renovated in 2005. The station serves both passengers of intercity cruise ships and commuter boats (including high-speed fleet) – to the Kamsky Ustye, Tetyush, Bolgar, Pechishch, Sviyazhsk and Sadovaya. The daily passenger traffic in the summer period is up to 6,000 people per day. In winter, pneumocushion boats are used, it goes from Kazan to Verkhny Uslon.

=== Highways ===
There are federal highway connections to Moscow and Ufa (E-22), Orenburg (R-239), Ulyanovsk (R-241) and Igra (R-242). There are also the R-175 federal highway and "Northern Europe – Western China" (in construction) route near the city.

There are five bridges across the Kazanka (Qazansu) river in the city, and one bridge connecting Kazan with the opposite bank of the Volga.

=== Intercity buses ===
There are two bus stations in Kazan—Central and Southern. Bus routes connect Kazan with all districts of Tatarstan, Samara, Ufa, Tolyatti, Orenburg, Ulyanovsk, Cheboksary, Sterlitamak, Buzuluk, and Aktobe.

=== Kazan International Airport ===
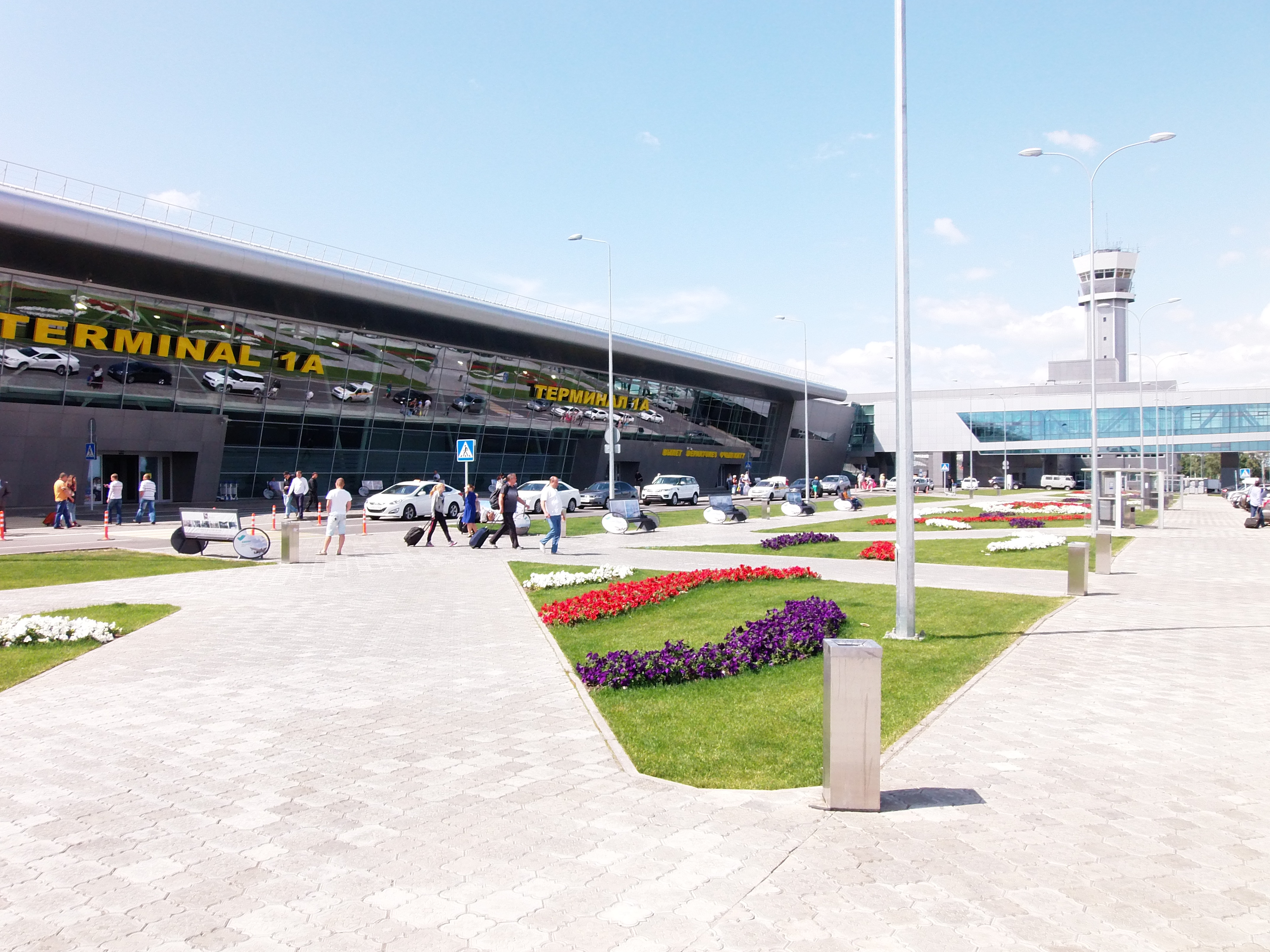
Kazan International Airport

Kazan International Airport is located 26 km (16 mi) from the city centre. It is a hub for UVT Aero and Kazan Air Enterprise and hosts eleven air companies. The airport is connected with the city by bus route #97 and by a suburban train line. There is also the Kazan Borisoglebskoye airfield, home to Kazan Aircraft Production Association, a major aircraft factory, famous in the past as "Aircraft Plant 22" ("22nd Zavod").

Adjacent to it lies a huge aircraft engines plant ("16th Zavod"). It produces versions of Tupolev 204 and 214 aircraft. In the past an Ilyushin-62, four-engine Russian mainliner, Tupolev-160 "Black Jack" supersonic strategic bomber and Tu-22M tactical bomber were also produced here. Both these plants and adjacent workers' housing make a whole city district known as Aviastroitelny ("Aircraft Builders").

=== Barabız (historic) ===
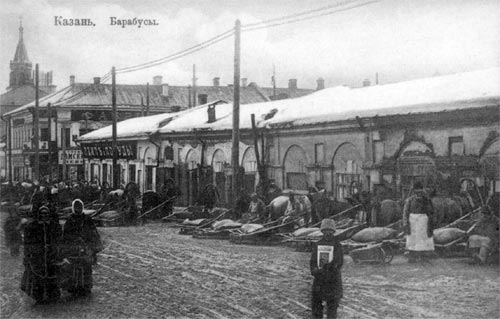
Barabuses in Kazan

A barabus (rendering of Tatar barabız "we are going" + English bus) was a winter public transport in the 19th to early 20th centuries, probably the first public transport in Kazan after cabs. They were operated by private carriers who were poor Tatar commoners from surrounding villages. A typical barabus was a sledge sheeted with sacking. Barabus was a transport of paupers competing with cabs, horse railways and later tramways. Until the 1930s, when trams were installed in the suburbs and any private enterprise was prohibited, barabuses were the only transport to connect quarters of poor mill-hands with other parts of the city.

== Demographics ==
=== Population ===
Historical population
Year	Pop.	±%
1897	130,000	—
1926	175,597	+35.1%
1939	398,014	+126.7%
1959	646,806	+62.5%
1970	868,537	+34.3%
1979	992,675	+14.3%
1989	1,094,378	+10.2%
2002	1,105,289	+1.0%
2010	1,143,535	+3.5%
2021	1,308,660	+14.4%
Source: Census data

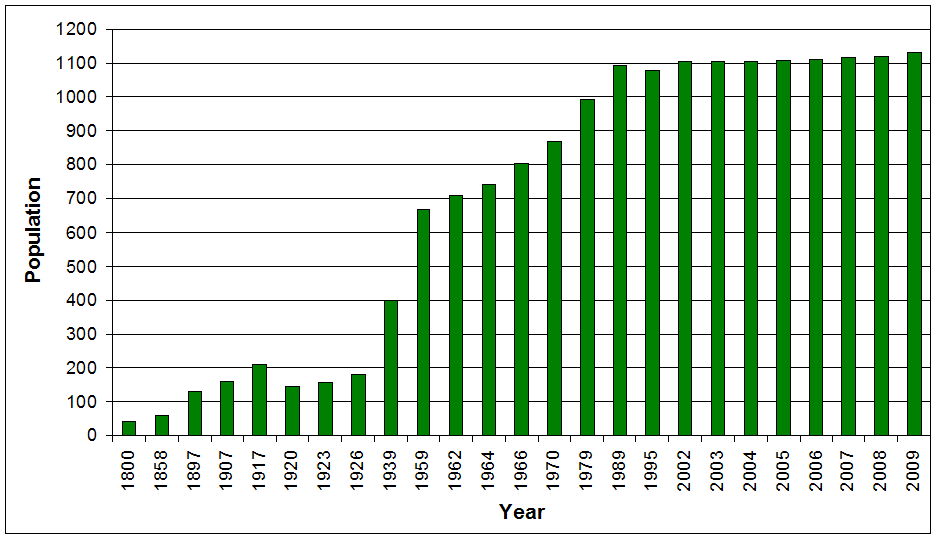
Population of Kazan since 1800

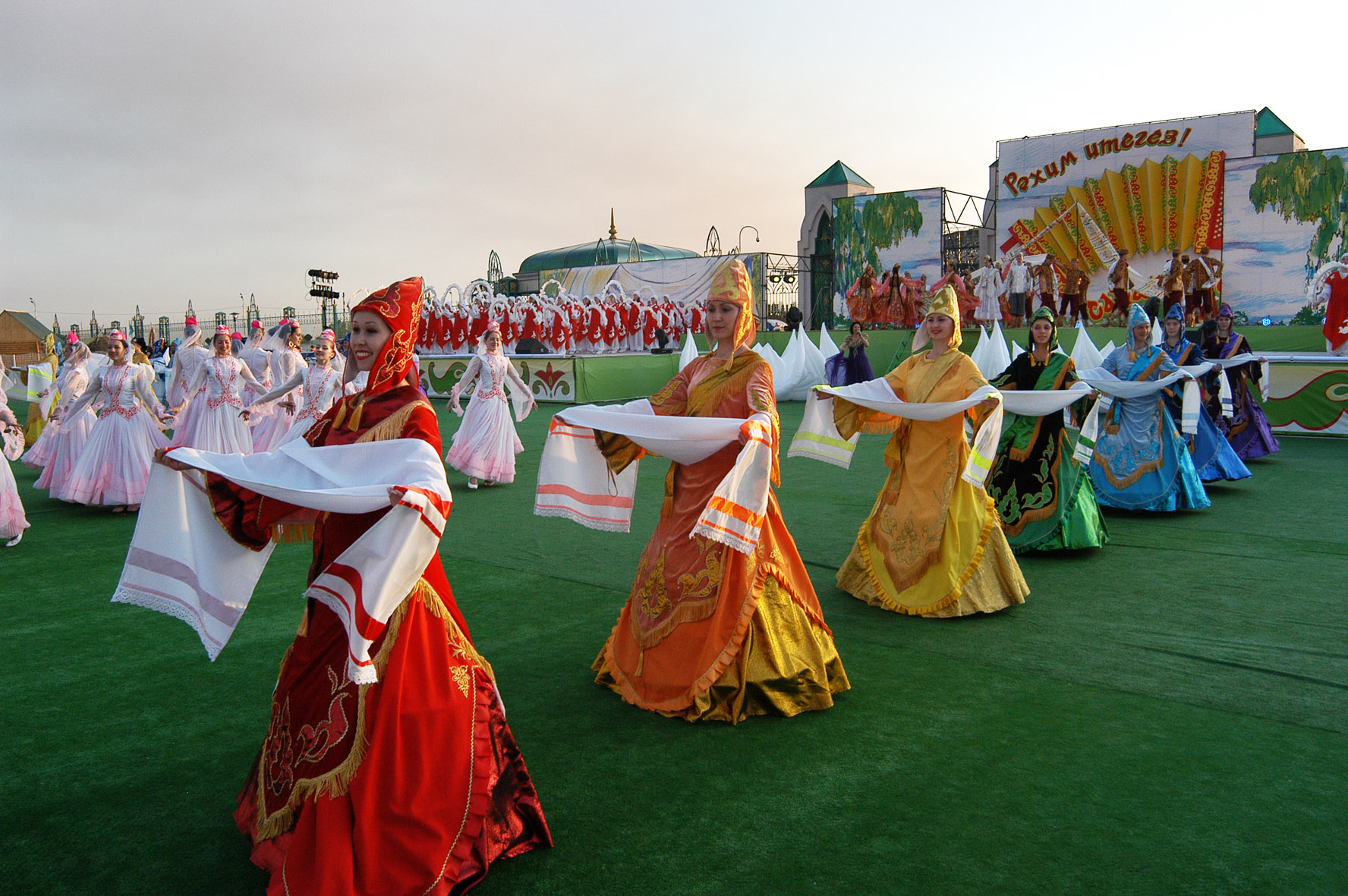
Tatar women in Kazan, 2007

Population: 1,308,660 (2021 census); 1,143,535 (2010 census); 1,105,289 (2002 census); 1,094,378 (1989 Soviet census). Kazan metropolitan area's population is 1.8 million.

=== Ethnicity ===
As of 2021, the ethnic composition of Kazan was:

Ethnicity	Population	Percentage
Tatars	608,519	48.8%
Russians	584,232	46.9%
Chuvash	9,470	0.8%
Uzbeks	6,473	0.5%
Others	37,285	3.0%

The city's population consists mostly of ethnic Tatars (48.8%) and ethnic Russians (46.9%). Other ethnicities include Chuvash, Uzbeks, Tajiks, Azerbaijanis and Mari.

=== Religion ===
Religion in Kazan (2024)
1. Islam (52.5%)
2. Orthodox (43.0%)
3. Other Christian (2.00%)
4. Judaism (1.00%)
5. Other religions and non-religious individuals (1.50%)

The predominant faiths of the city of Kazan are Islam and Eastern Orthodox Christianity, with minority representation of Roman Catholicism, Protestantism, Judaism, and the Baháʼí Faith.The majority of Muslims in Tatarstan adhere to the Hanafi school (madhhab) of Sunni Islam.

=== Languages ===
The most spoken language in Kazan is Russian, and the Tatar language is the second most spoken.

== Geography ==
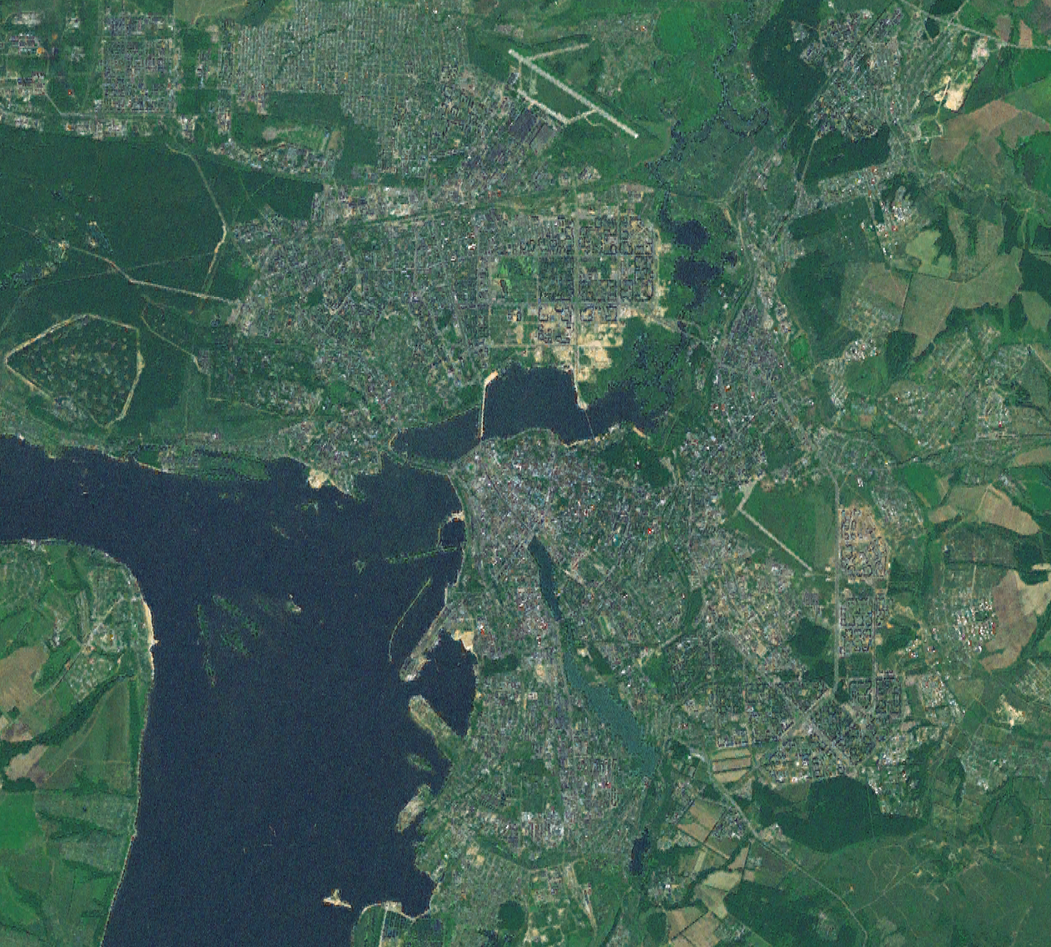
Satellite view

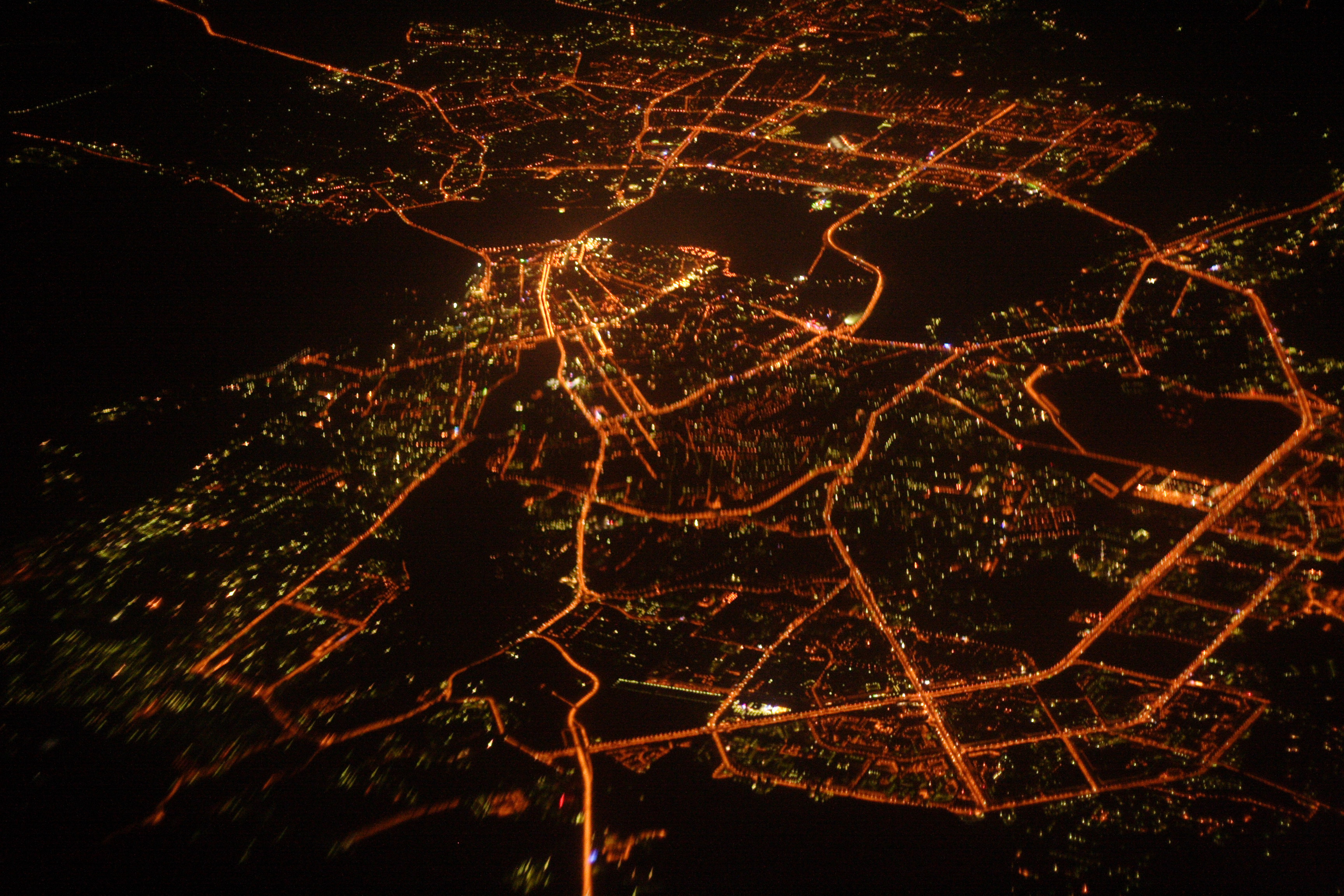
Night aerial view of radial Kazan

=== Climate ===
Kazan

Climate chart (precipitation, max. and min. temperature)
J	F	M	A	M	J	J	A	S	O	N	D
46 −7 −13	37 −6 −13	38 0 −7	34 11 2	38 20 9	57 24 14	62 26 16	55 24 14	50 17 9	54 9 3	45 0 −5	50 −5 −11
- █ Average max. and min. temperatures in °C
- █ Precipitation totals in mm
- Source: https://www.pogodaiklimat.ru/climate/27595.htm
Imperial conversion
J	F	M	A	M	J	J	A	S	O	N	D
1.8 19 9	1.5 21 9	1.5 33 20	1.3 51 35	1.5 67 48	2.2 74 56	2.4 78 60	2.2 74 57	2 62 48	2.1 47 37	1.8 31 24	2 22 13
- █ Average max. and min. temperatures in °F
- █ Precipitation totals in inches

Kazan has a humid continental climate (Köppen: Dfb) with long, cold winters (colder than Moscow), and warm, sunny summers. As a result of its far inland position, summers are extremely warm for its latitude and winters are quite cold compared to areas further west in Europe.

The warmest month is July with daily mean temperature near 20.2 °C (68.4 °F), and the coldest month is January, with a daily mean of −10.4 °C (13.3 °F).

The city set its two hottest days on record during the 2010 Northern Hemisphere summer heat waves. Temperatures reached +39 °C (102 °F) in the hottest days during that time.

Climate data for Kazan (1991–2020, extremes 1812–present)
Month	Jan	Feb	Mar	Apr	May	Jun	Jul	Aug	Sep	Oct	Nov	Dec	Year
Record high °C (°F)	4.5 (40.1)	5.6 (42.1)	15.8 (60.4)	29.5 (85.1)	33.5 (92.3)	37.5 (99.5)	38.9 (102.0)	39.0 (102.2)	32.3 (90.1)	23.4 (74.1)	15.0 (59.0)	6.1 (43.0)	39.0 (102.2)
Mean daily maximum °C (°F)	−7.1 (19.2)	−6.3 (20.7)	0.3 (32.5)	10.5 (50.9)	19.7 (67.5)	23.6 (74.5)	25.8 (78.4)	23.5 (74.3)	16.8 (62.2)	8.5 (47.3)	−0.3 (31.5)	−5.4 (22.3)	9.1 (48.4)
Daily mean °C (°F)	−10.0 (14.0)	−9.7 (14.5)	−3.3 (26.1)	5.8 (42.4)	14.0 (57.2)	18.3 (64.9)	20.5 (68.9)	18.3 (64.9)	12.3 (54.1)	5.3 (41.5)	−2.5 (27.5)	−8.0 (17.6)	5.1 (41.2)
Mean daily minimum °C (°F)	−12.8 (9.0)	−12.7 (9.1)	−6.5 (20.3)	1.9 (35.4)	9.0 (48.2)	13.5 (56.3)	15.8 (60.4)	13.9 (57.0)	8.7 (47.7)	2.7 (36.9)	−4.5 (23.9)	−10.5 (13.1)	1.5 (34.7)
Record low °C (°F)	−46.8 (−52.2)	−39.9 (−39.8)	−31.7 (−25.1)	−27.2 (−17.0)	−6.5 (20.3)	−1.4 (29.5)	2.6 (36.7)	1.0 (33.8)	−5.4 (22.3)	−23.4 (−10.1)	−36.6 (−33.9)	−43.9 (−47.0)	−46.8 (−52.2)
Average precipitation mm (inches)	46 (1.8)	37 (1.5)	38 (1.5)	34 (1.3)	38 (1.5)	57 (2.2)	62 (2.4)	55 (2.2)	50 (2.0)	54 (2.1)	45 (1.8)	50 (2.0)	566 (22.3)
Average extreme snow depth cm (inches)	30 (12)	42 (17)	44 (17)	9 (3.5)	0 (0)	0 (0)	0 (0)	0 (0)	0 (0)	0 (0)	5 (2.0)	16 (6.3)	44 (17)
Average rainy days	3	2	4	11	15	18	16	16	18	17	10	5	135
Average snowy days	26	22	16	6	1	0	0	0	1	7	20	24	123
Average relative humidity (%)	84	80	76	67	58	65	68	70	75	80	85	84	74
Mean monthly sunshine hours	35.6	71.9	144.4	213.0	290.1	308.6	316.1	253.0	156.3	78.0	32.9	21.4	1,921.3
Source 1: Погода и Климат
Source 2: NOAA

== Central Kazan ==
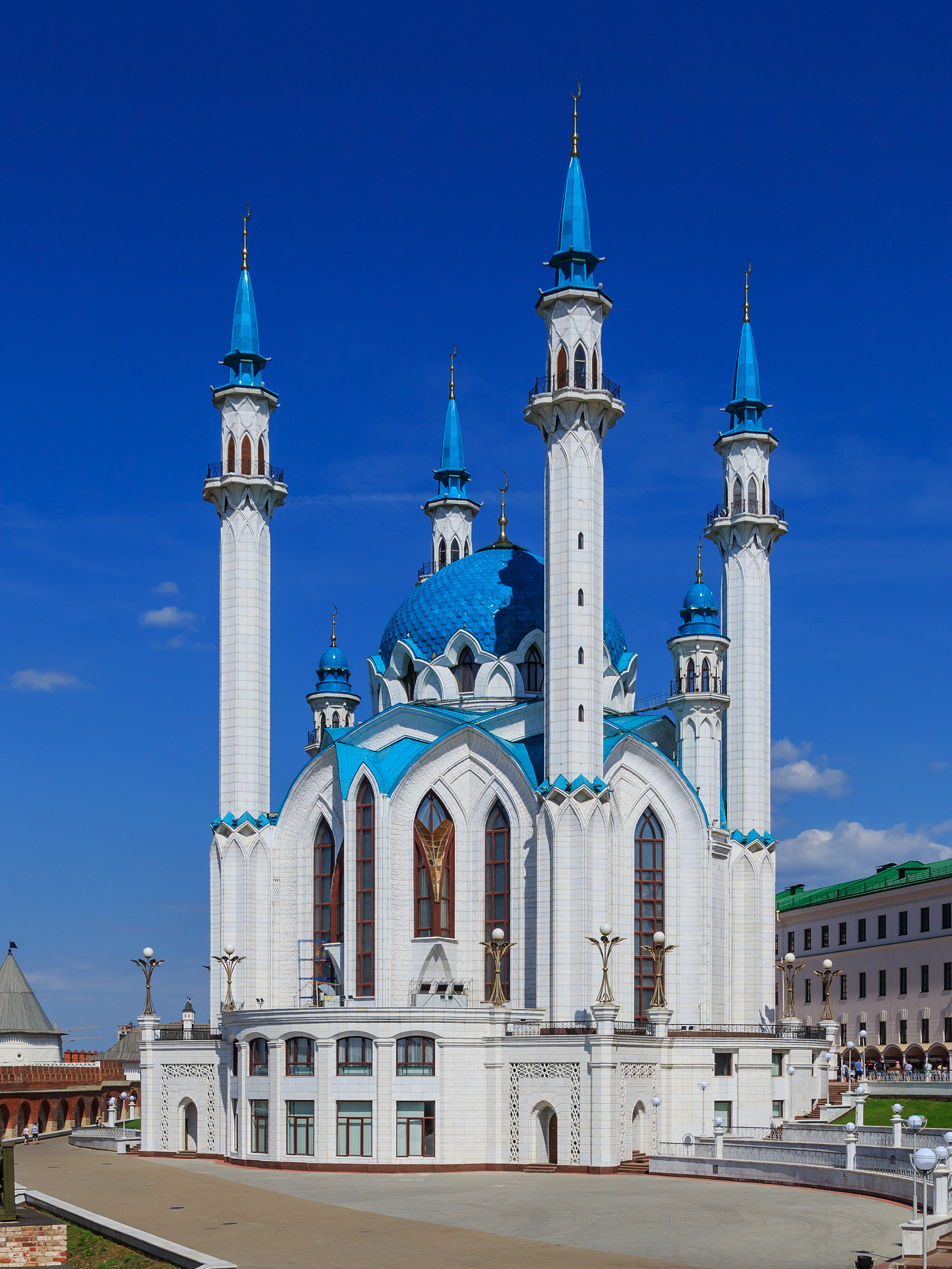
Kul Sharif Mosque

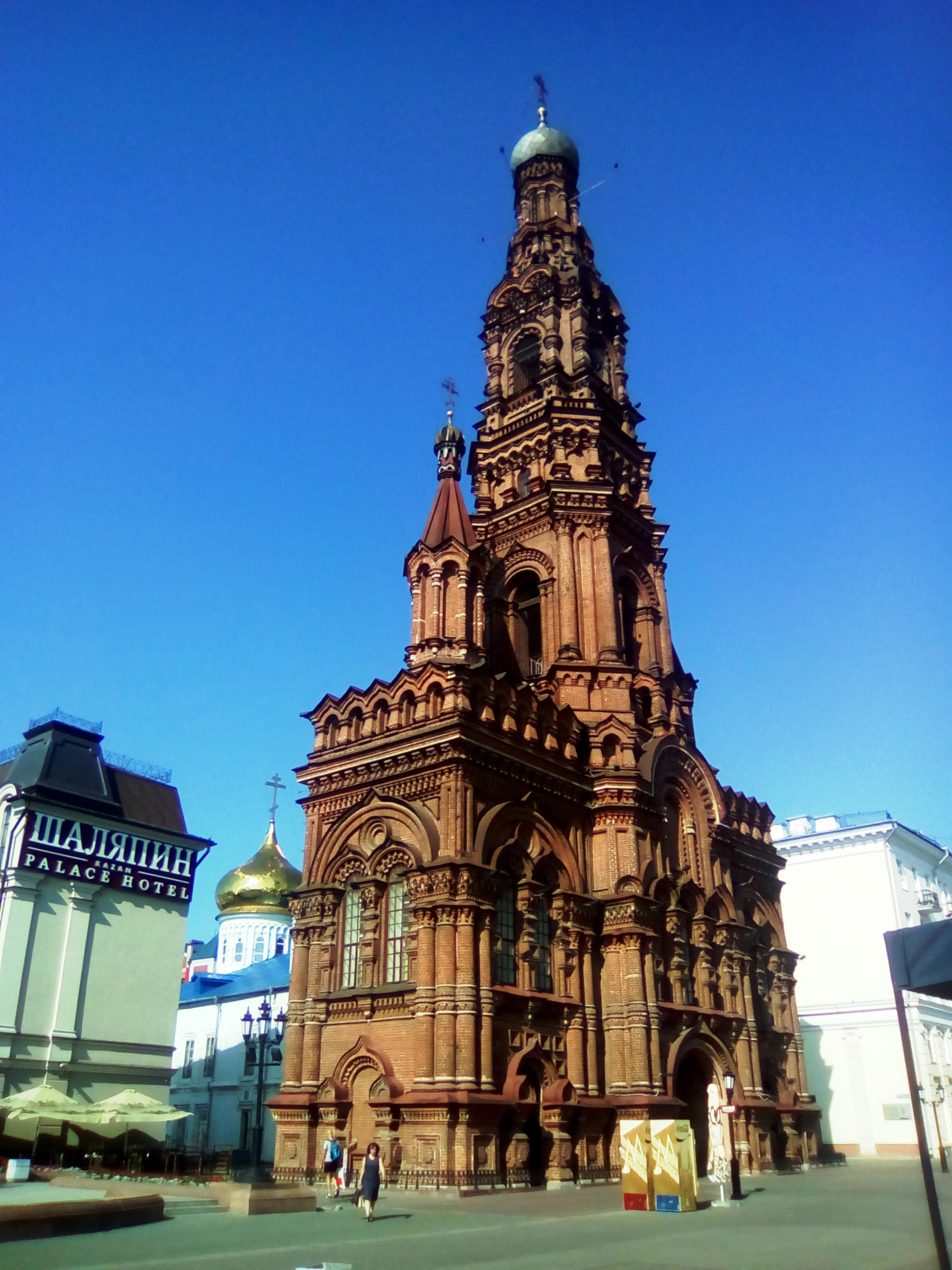
Belltower of Epiphany Church

=== Kremlin ===
The city has a citadel (Russian: кремль, romanized: kreml', or sometimes Tatar: kirman), which was declared a World Heritage Site in 2000. Major monuments in the Kremlin are the five-domed, six-columned Annunciation Cathedral (1561–1562) and the mysterious, formerly leaning Söyembikä Tower, named after the last queen of Kazan and regarded as the city's most conspicuous landmark.

Also of interest are the towers and walls, erected in the 16th and 17th centuries but later reconstructed; the Kul Sharif Mosque, which has been rebuilt inside the citadel; remains of the Saviour Monastery (a 16th-century cathedral demolished by the Bolsheviks) with the Spasskaya Tower; and the Governor's House (1843–1853), designed by Konstantin Thon, now the Palace of the President of Tatarstan.

Next door, the ornate baroque Saints Peter and Paul Cathedral on Qawi Nacmi Street, and Märcani Mosque on Qayum Nasiri Street date back to the 18th century.

==== Towers ====
The Spasskaya Tower was built in two floors by 16th century Pskov architects Ivan Shiryai and Postnik Yakovlev. From the inside, the northern side of the fortress to the Spasskaya Tower adjoined the gate to Spasskaya Church, which has now merged with the tower. The typical Pskovian architectural elements of the facade face the main street of the Kremlin. At the end of the 17th century, instead of three tiers, the tower was built with two brick eight-sided tiers with a brick roof, getting its present, familiar appearance. Until 1917, the tower was crowned with the double-headed coat of arms of the Russian state. In the 18th century, a ringing clock was installed in the upper tier, and even earlier a large bell was moved from a small belfry (now lost, located on the castle wall on the left side of the tower). Until the middle of the 19th century, there was a moat with a stone bridge in front of the tower.

The South-Western Tower was built simultaneously with the Spasskaya tower by Pskov masters and is a classic example of the Pskov style of defensive structures.

The name of the Transfiguration Tower comes from the Transfiguration Monastery of the Savior, which was fenced from the north-west. The tower was also built by Pskov architects Postnik and Barma, but it was significantly rebuilt later, as it has strong traces of the architectural influence of the Moscow defensive architecture. The territory from the Transfiguration Tower to the Spasskaya pass was added to the old Khan's fortress by Pskov masters.

There are unnamed round brick towers, presumably built by Moscow architects in the 17th century.

The Tainitskaya Tower was built in its present form in the 1550s by Postnik Yakovlev. It was named after a secret source from which it was possible to take water during a siege. The entrance to the tower is in the form of a "knee", which increased the defence of the Kremlin. It replaced a tower from the time of the khanate, Nur Ali (in Russian transcription Muraleeva). The 22-year-old Tsar Ivan the Terrible entered the conquered city through the Nur Ali tower.

The North-Eastern Round Tower was demolished after the Pugachev's assault.

The Consistor Tower was built in brick by Moscow architects in the 17th century, its name was given in the 18th century from the Spiritual Consistory located near the tower in the Kremlin. Near the tower, archaeological excavations revealed the so-called Tezitsky (Arabic for 'merchant') Moat, which went from the Consistor Tower to the Transfiguration. Archaeologist N. Kalinin and a number of scientists believed that the moat was the southern border of the Khan's fortress.

The Southeast Round Tower is an example of Pskov architecture of the 16th century.

=== Bistä, or Posad ===
Central Kazan is divided into two districts by the Bolaq canal and Kaban Lakes. The first district (Qazan Bistäse or Kazanskiy Posad), historically Russian, is situated on the hill, the second (İske Tatar Bistäse or Staro-Tatarskaya Sloboda), historically Tatar, is situated between the Bolaq and the Volga. Mosques, such as Nurullah, Soltan, Bornay, Äcem, Märcani, İske Taş, and Zäñgär are in the Tatar district.

Churches, such as Blagoveschenskaya, Varvarinskaya, Nikol'skaya, Tikhvinskaya, are mostly in the Russian part of the city. In the centre of town there is a Roman Catholic church, Church of the Exaltation of the Holy Cross.

The main city-centre streets are Bauman, Kremlyovskaya, Dzerzhinsky, Tuqay, Pushkin, Butlerov, Gorkiy, Karl Marx and Märcani.

=== Wooden Kazan ===
In the beginning of the 1900s most of Central Kazan was covered by wooden buildings, usually consisting of two floors. There was a historical environment of Kazan citizens, but not the best place to live in. During the Republican program "The liquidation of ramshackle apartments" most of them (unlike other Russian cities), especially in Central Kazan, where the land is not cheap, were destroyed and their population was moved to new areas at the suburb of the city (Azino, Azino-2, Quartal 39). Nearly 100,000 citizens resettled by this programme.

=== Other major buildings ===
Another significant building in central Kazan is the former "Smolentzev and Shmelev" tea house and hotel, now the Shalyapin Palace Hotel. It is located at 7/80 Universitetskaya Street, at the corner of Universitetskaya and Bauman. A major landmark of late-19th and early-20th century commercial architecture, it consists of two portions. The original portion, built for a merchant named Usmanov in the 1860s, was bought by the inter-related families of Efim Smolentzev and Pavel and Nikolai Shmelev in 1899. They operated a store selling, among other things, tea. In 1910, the Smolentevs and Shmelevs constructed another portion, designed by architect Vasili Trifonov, and operated a hotel there. After the Russian Revolution, the building became the Hotel Soviet. Following extensive renovations in the early 2000s, it reopened as the Shalyapin Palace Hotel.

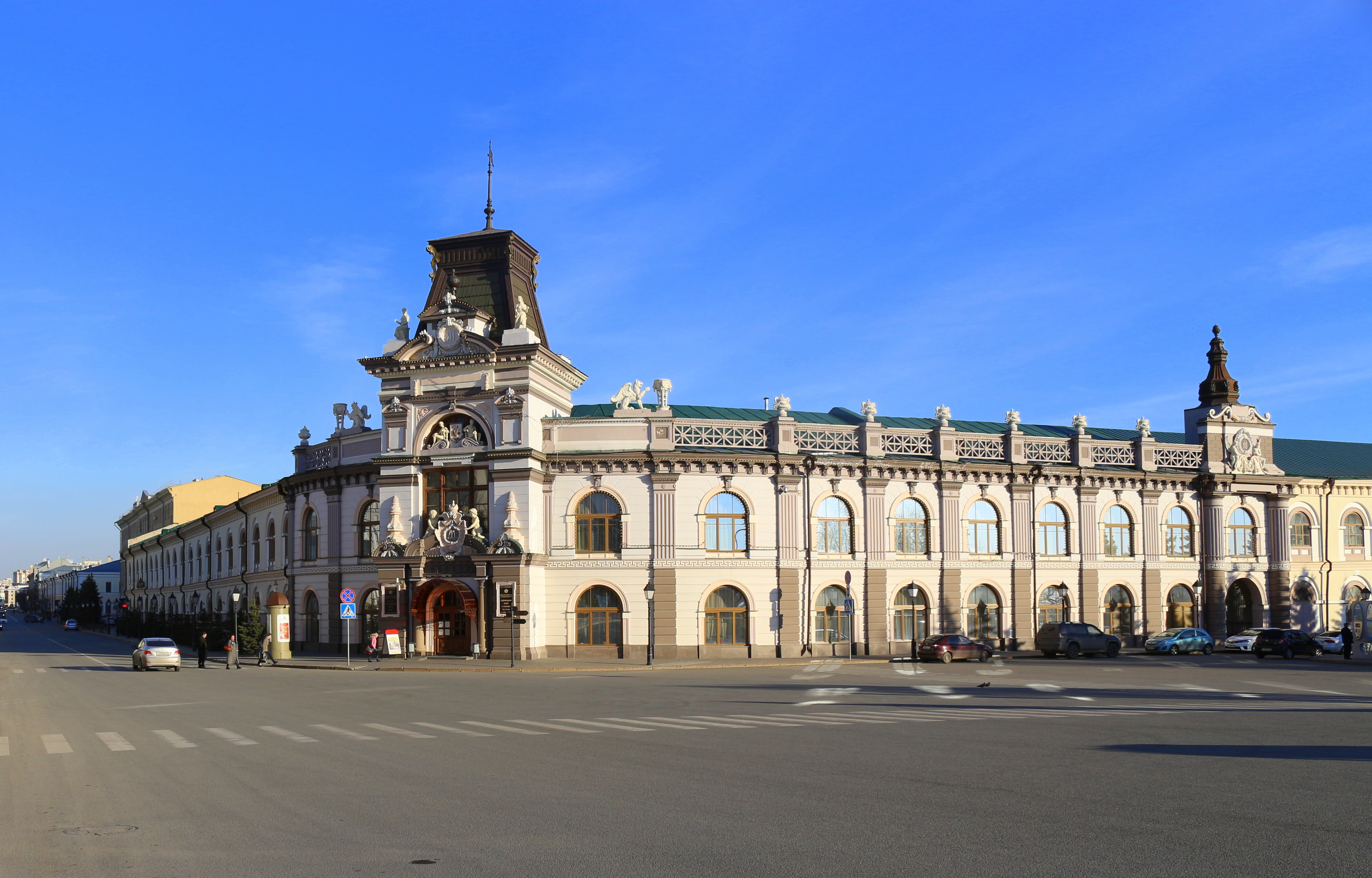
National Museum of Tatarstan

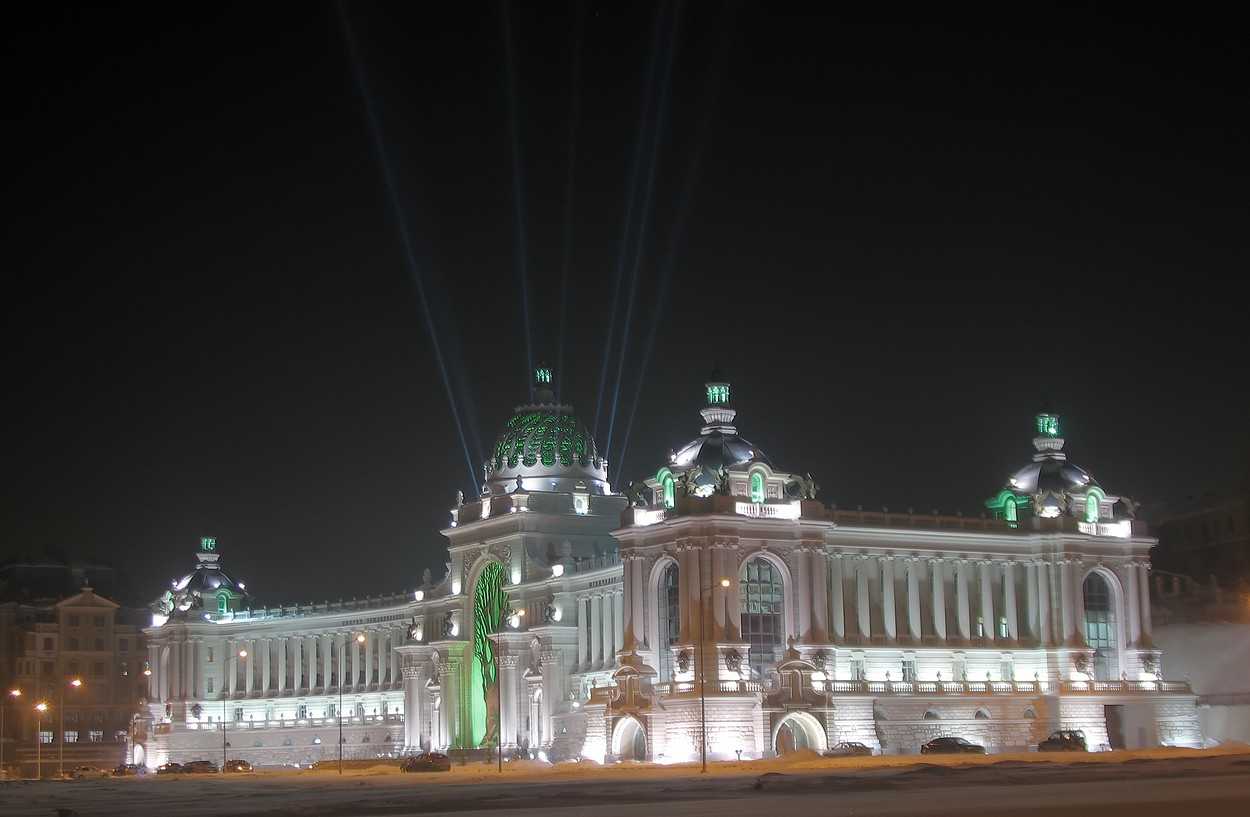
Agricultural Palace

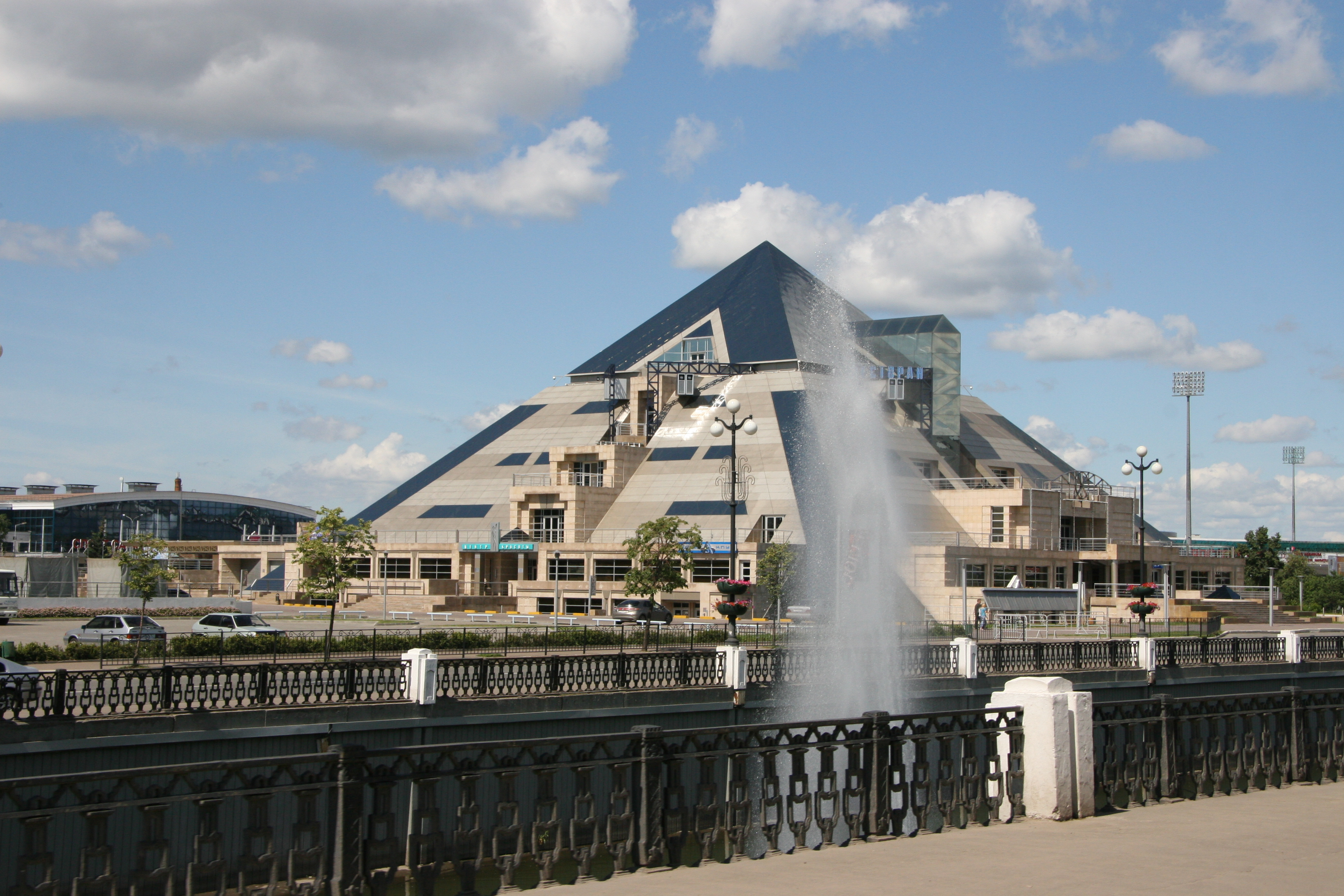
Pyramid concert hall

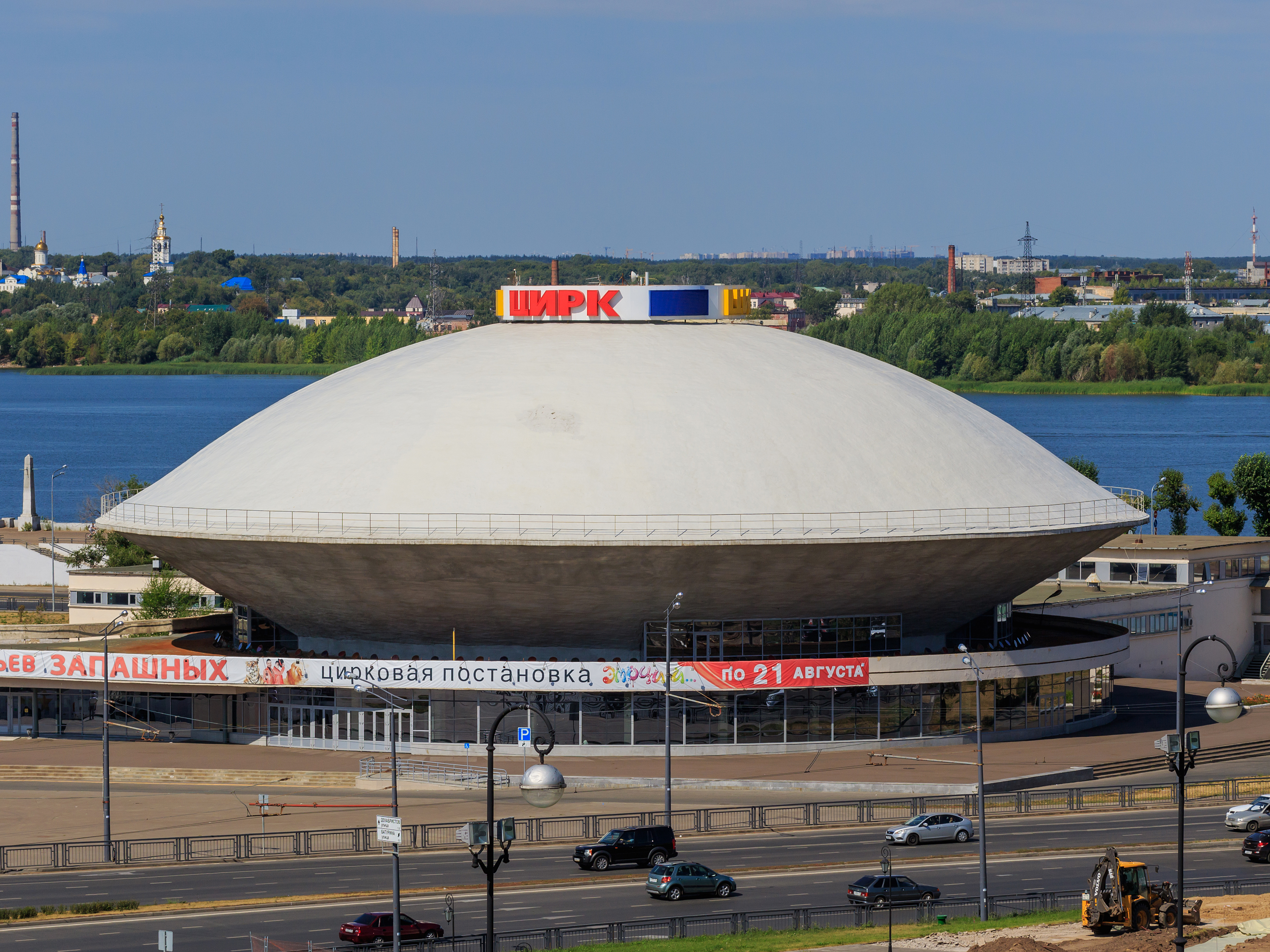
Kazan circus

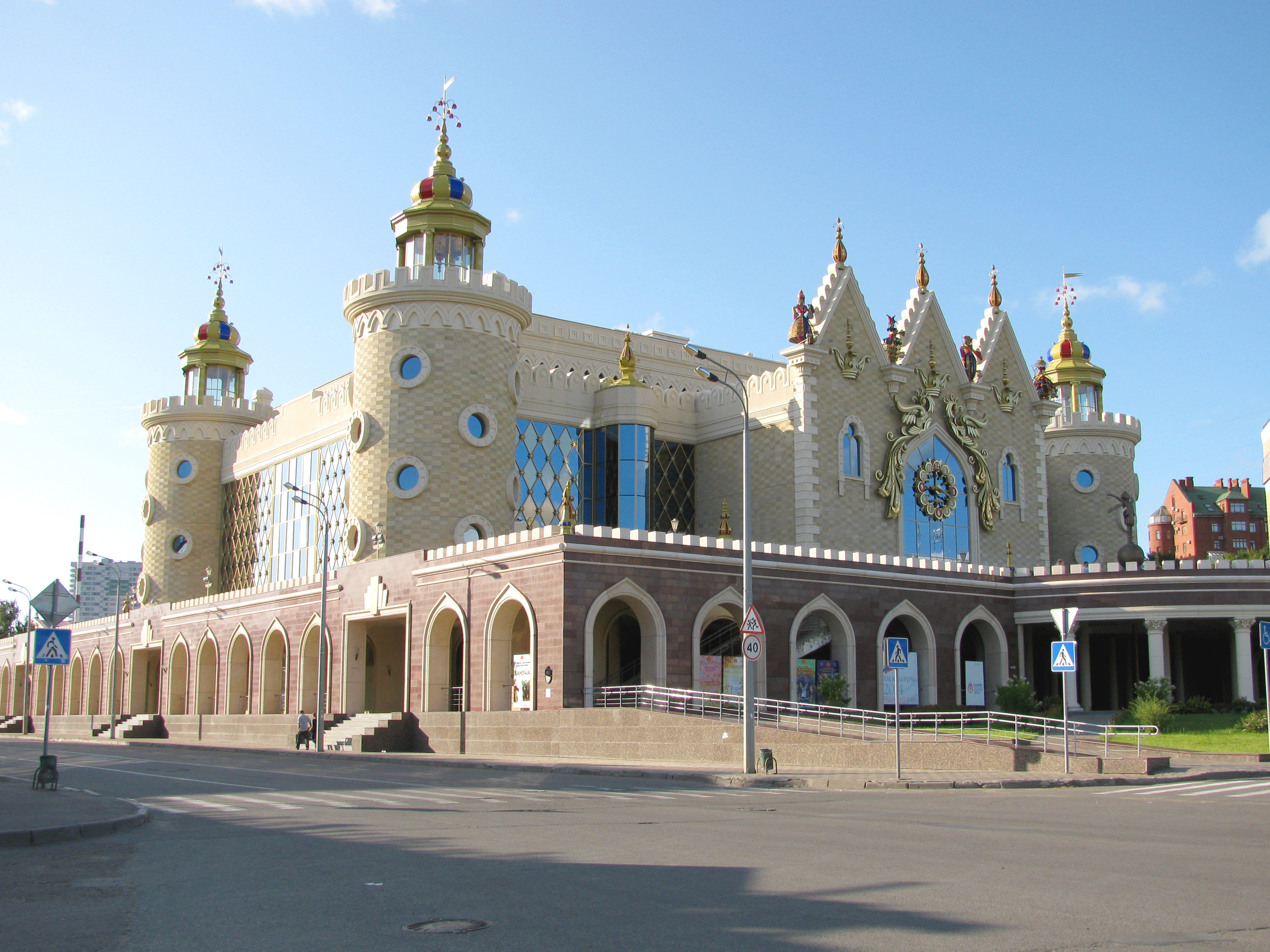
Puppet Theatre

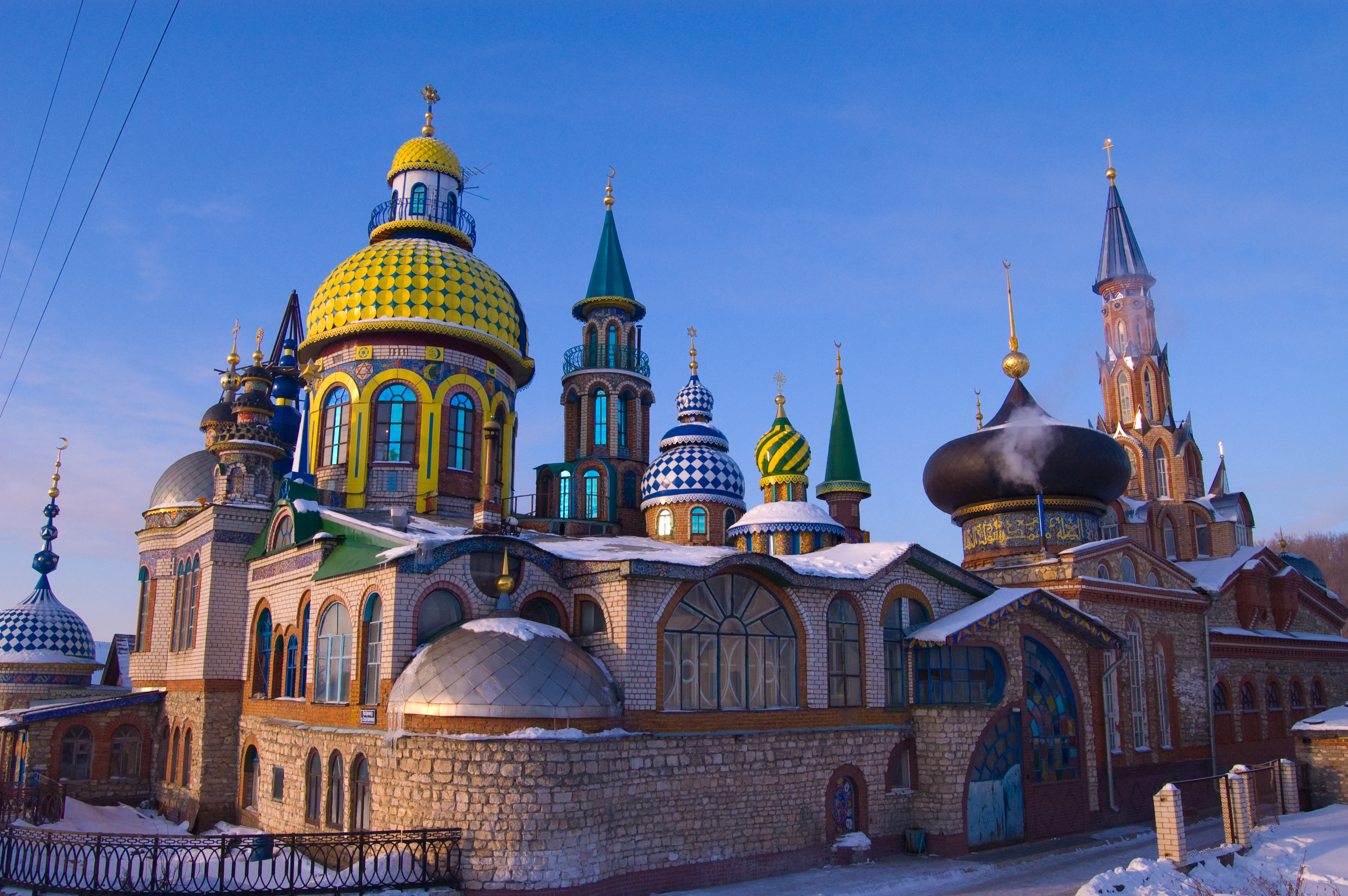
Temple of All Religions

== Cityscape ==
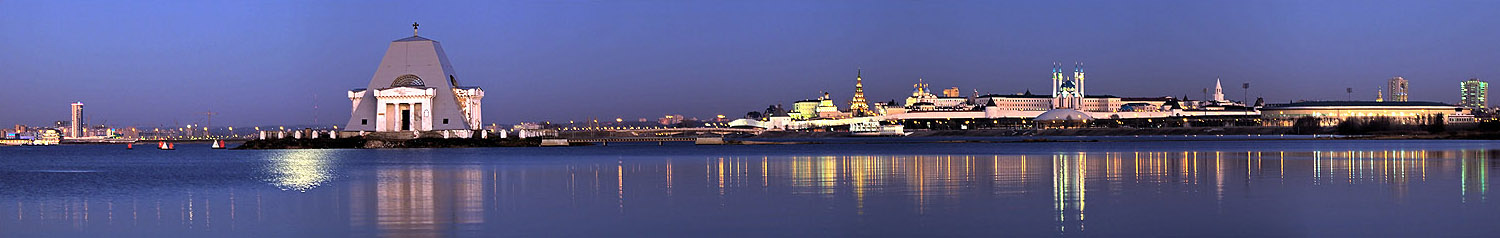
A panoramic view of Kazan Kremlin, Vernicle temple, and Kazanka river left bank
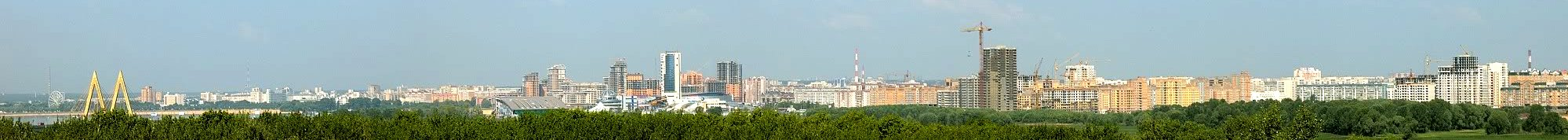
Kazanka right bank
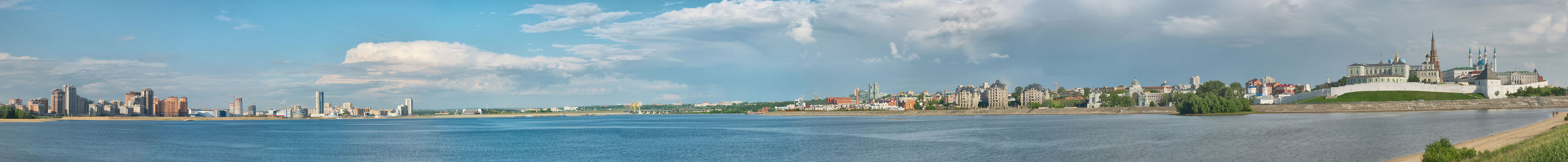
Both banks of Kazanka

== Education and science ==
=== Primary and secondary education ===
Primary and secondary education system of Kazan includes:

- 282 nurseries, most of which are municipal
- 178 schools, 2 of which are private
- 28 vocational technical schools
- 15 colleges
- 10 special colleges

There are also 49 music schools, 43 sports school, and 10 fine-arts schools, including the Kazan Art School founded in 1895.

=== Higher education ===
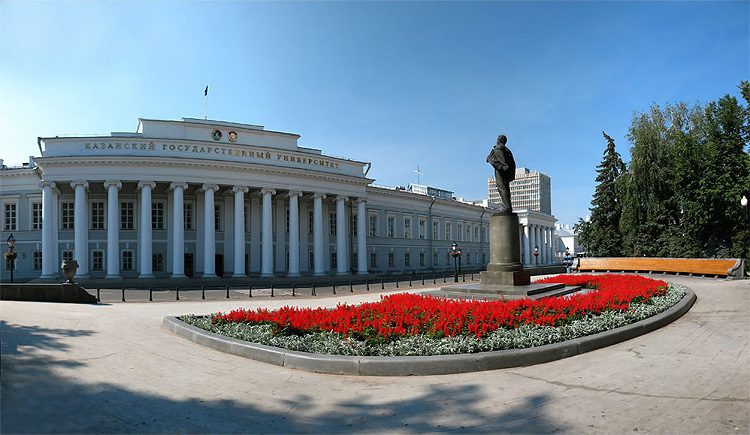
Kazan Federal University

There are 44 institutes of higher education in Kazan, including 19 branches of universities from other cities. More than 140,000 students are educated in the city. Kazan Federal University (founded in 1804) is third oldest university in Russia after Saint Petersburg State University (1724) and Moscow State University (1755). In 2009 KFU got Federal status as main university of Volga.

Some other prominent universities are:

- Kazan State Technical University – founded in 1932. In 2009 it got status of National university
- Kazan State Medical University – founded in 1814 as a department within Kazan State University
- Kazan State Technological University – founded in 1919 on the base of pre-existing vocational school
- Kazan Conservatory – founded in 1945
- Kazan State Agricultural University – founded in 1922
- Volga Region State Academy of Physical Culture, Sport and Tourism founded in July 2010 in the framework of the XXVII World Summer Universiade Legacy. The branch, located in Naberezhnye Chelny, will proceed functioning.

=== Science ===
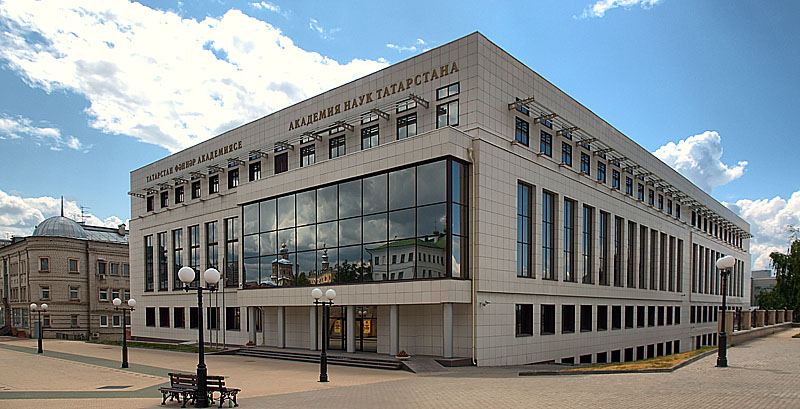
Main building of Tatarstan Academy of Sciences

Kazan is a major scientific centre in Russia. Kazan formed a big number of scientific areas and schools (mathematical, chemical, medical, linguistic, geological, geobotanical, etc.). Scientific discoveries and theories are a subject of special pride, including: the creation of non-Euclidean geometry (Nikolai Lobachevsky), the theory about the structure of organic compounds (Aleksandr Butlerov), and the discoveries of the chemical element ruthenium (Karl Ernst Claus), electron paramagnetic resonance (Yevgeny Zavoisky), and acoustic paramagnetic resonance (Semen Altshuler), and many others. The city hosts:

- Kazan Science Centre of Russian Academy of Sciences, since 1945. It includes 5 academic institutions.
- Tatarstan Academy of Sciences, since 1991. It includes 7 local departments with 13 academic institutions (also, 21 organisations are under the guidance of TAS) and one branch in Ulyanovsk.

== Government and administration ==
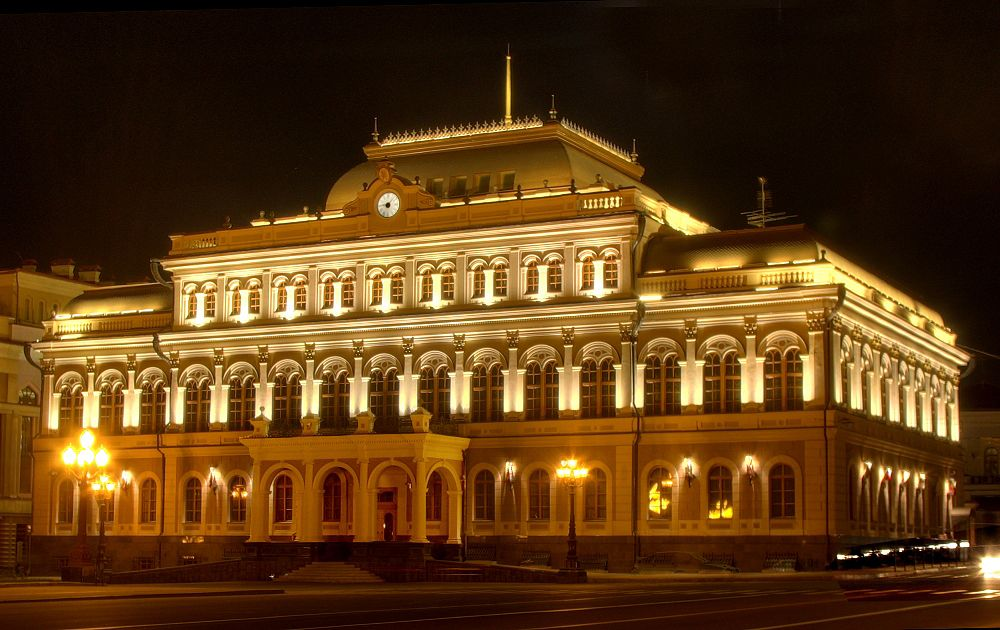
Kazan town hall (before 1917 – the Hall of Nobility)

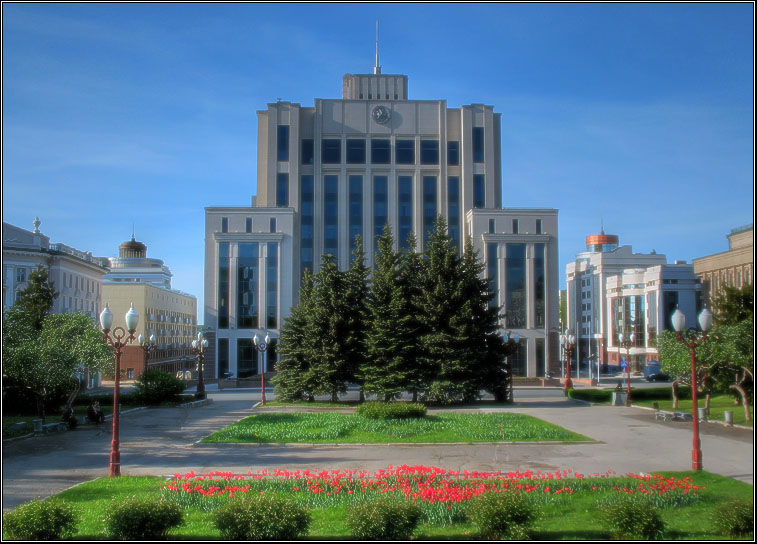
Cabinet of Ministers

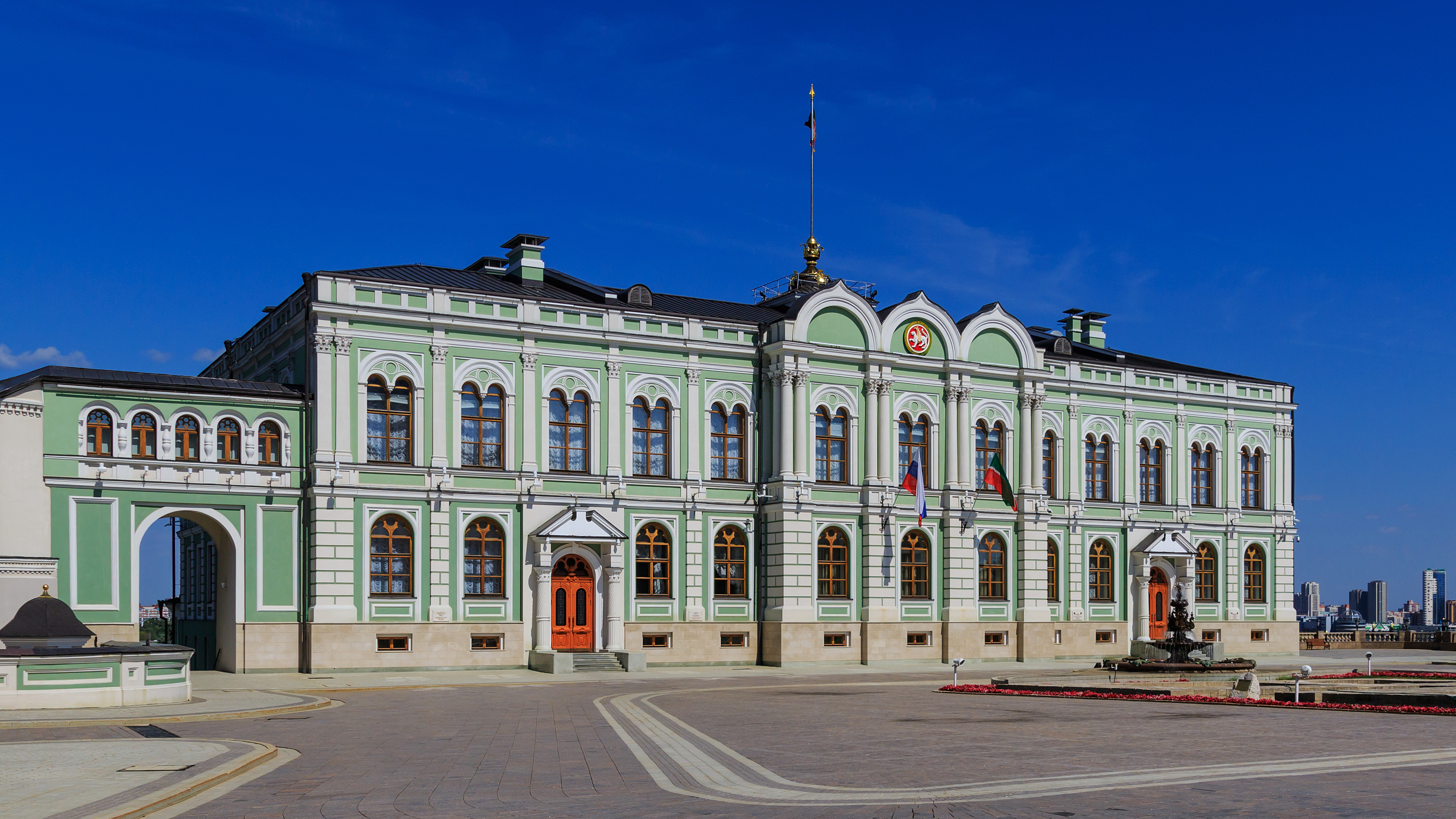
Presidential Palace

Kazan City Duma is a representative body of the city, elected every four years and holds its sessions in Kazan City Hall. The executive committee is a municipal body of the executive organs. The committee's head is Denis Kalinkin.

== Communication ==
Agency works 84 post offices belonging to the branch of "Russian Post", UFPS "Tatarstan pochtasy". The official opening of the Kazan city telephone network took place on 27 (15) November 1888. At the moment, there are four operators of wired telephone in Kazan. The total capacity of the telephone network in Kazan is about 456,000 numbers. Services of IP-telephony operators in addition to the basic wired connection is also supported by the five companies. The city has six mobile operators (Beeline, MegaFon, MTS, Tele2 Russia, Letai, Yota, and also operates virtual mobile operator "Mobile public communication"). By the number of Internet users—428 thousand people—Kazan takes the 4th place in Russia. According to the General Director of Google Russia Vladimir Dolgov, Kazan is the largest centre of information technology development, the level of Internet penetration is 75%, which is a record figure for Russia. Access to the World Wide Web in Kazan is provided by 15 operators. The most popular forms of Internet access are cable networks and ADSL. Previously popular dial-up has almost lost its position, at the same time actively developing wireless technology Wi-Fi and Wi-Max. Scartel launched the first LTE network in Russia.

== Sports ==
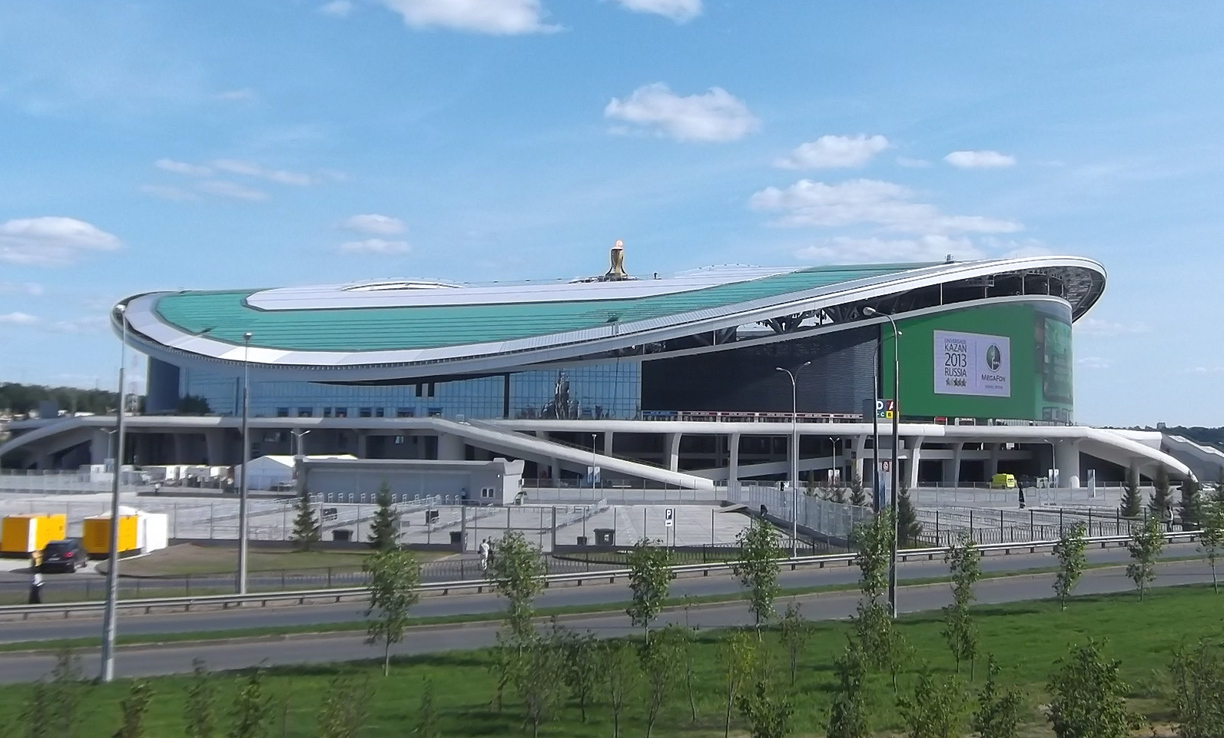
The Kazan Arena hosted the 2018 FIFA World Cup games.

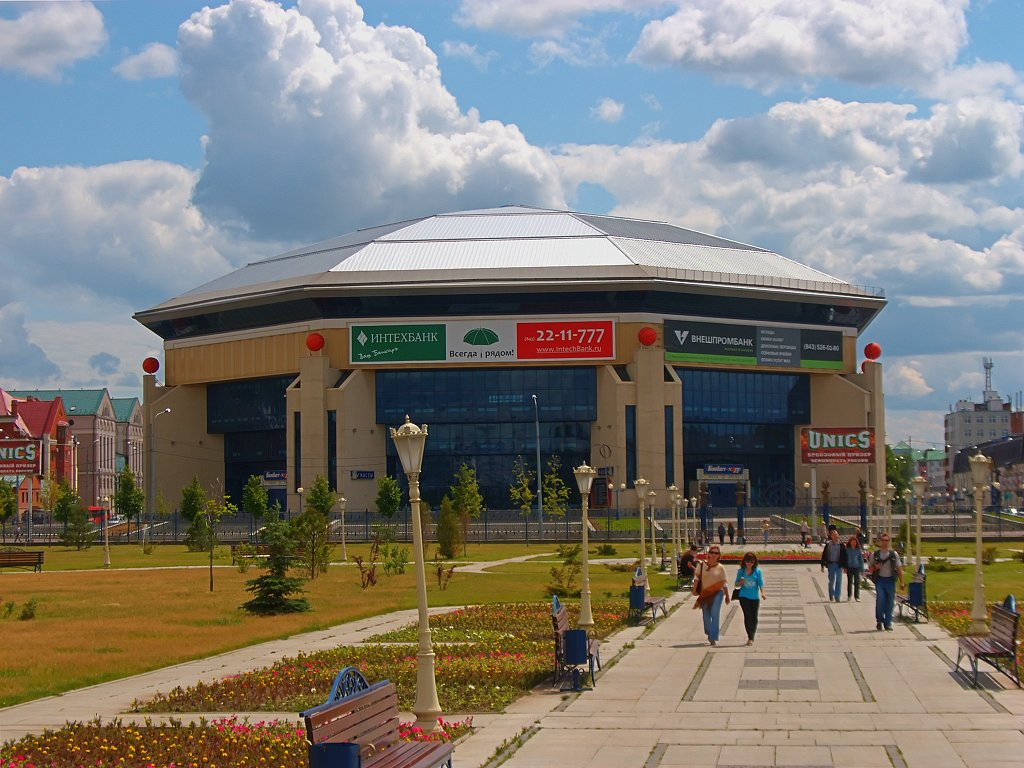
"Basket-hall"

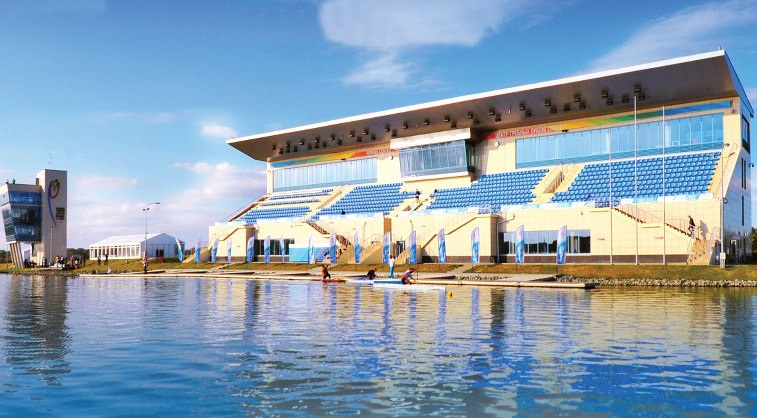
Kazan rowing centre

Kazan has hosted two Bandy World Championships, in 2005 and 2011, the 2013 Summer Universiade, the World Championship in fencing in 2014, the 2015 World Aquatics Championship FINA, 2017 FIFA Confederations Cup, 2018 FIFA World Cup and other international competitions of various levels.

Men's teams:

Club	Sport	Founded	Current league	League rank	Stadium
Rubin Kazan	Football	1958	Russian Premier League	1st	Kazan Arena
Ak Bars Kazan	Ice Hockey	1956	Kontinental Hockey League	1st	Tatneft Arena
Bars Kazan	Ice Hockey	2009	Minor Hockey League	Jr. 1st	Tatneft Arena
Irbis Kazan	Ice Hockey	2011	Minor Hockey League Division B	Jr. 2nd	Tatneft Arena
Dynamo-Kazan	Bandy	1958	Bandy Super League	1st	Raketa Stadium
UNICS Kazan	Basketball	1991	Professional Basketball League	1st	Basket-Hall Arena
Zenit Kazan	Volleyball	2000	Volleyball Super League	1st	Kazan Volleyball Centre
Sintez Kazan	Water Polo	1974	Water Polo Championship	1st	Orgsintez

=== Notable athletes ===
- Aliya Mustafina, artistic gymnastics
- Alexander Burmistrov, hockey player
- Viktor Kolotov, association football player
- Ruslan Nigmatullin, association football player
- Denis Arkhipov, hockey player
- Svetlana Demina, sport shooter
- Marat Safin, tennis player
- Dinara Safina, tennis player
- Alexander Fadeev, figure skater
- Evgenia Tarasova, figure skater
- Kamila Valieva, figure skater, 2021 Rostelecom Cup champion, the 2021 Skate Canada champion, the 2020 Junior World champion, the 2019–20 Junior Grand Prix Final champion, and the 2021 Russian national silver medalist
- Vasily Mosin, sport shooter

=== Infrastructure ===
- Kazan Arena – stadium with capacity 45,000, home ground for FC Rubin
- Central stadium – Olympic stadium, capacity 30,133, ex-home ground for FC Rubin
- TatNeft Arena – indoor sporting arena, capacity 10,000, home to HSC Aq Bars
- Basket-Hall – indoor sporting arena, capacity 7,000 (large hall) and 1,500 (small hall), home to BC UNICS
- Kazan Volleyball Centre, capacity 4,600, home to VC Zenit and WVC Dynamo-Kazan
- Raketa and Trudovye Rezervy ice stadiums

=== Important events ===
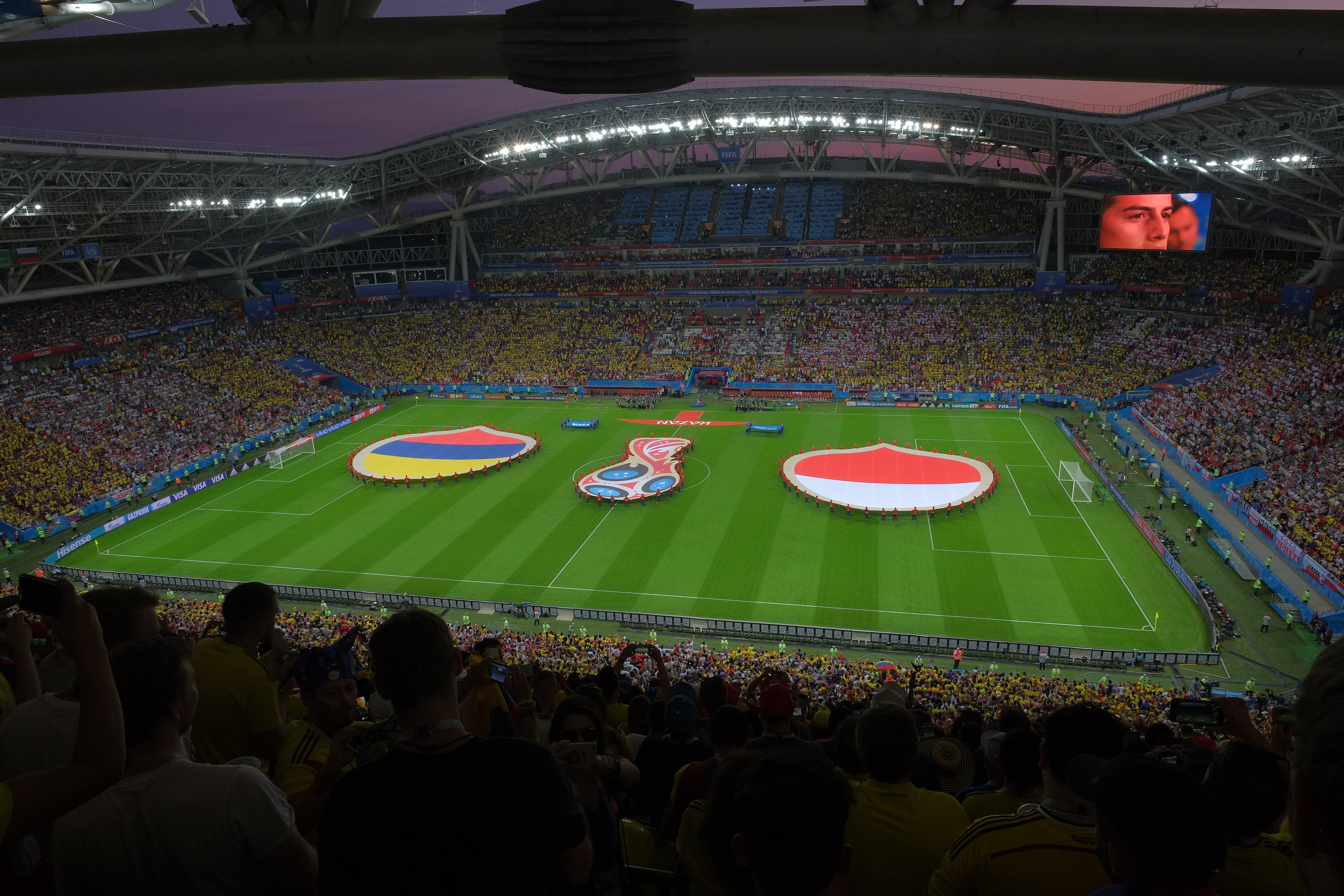
Poland vs Colombia match at Ak Bars Arena in Kazan during the 2018 FIFA World Cup

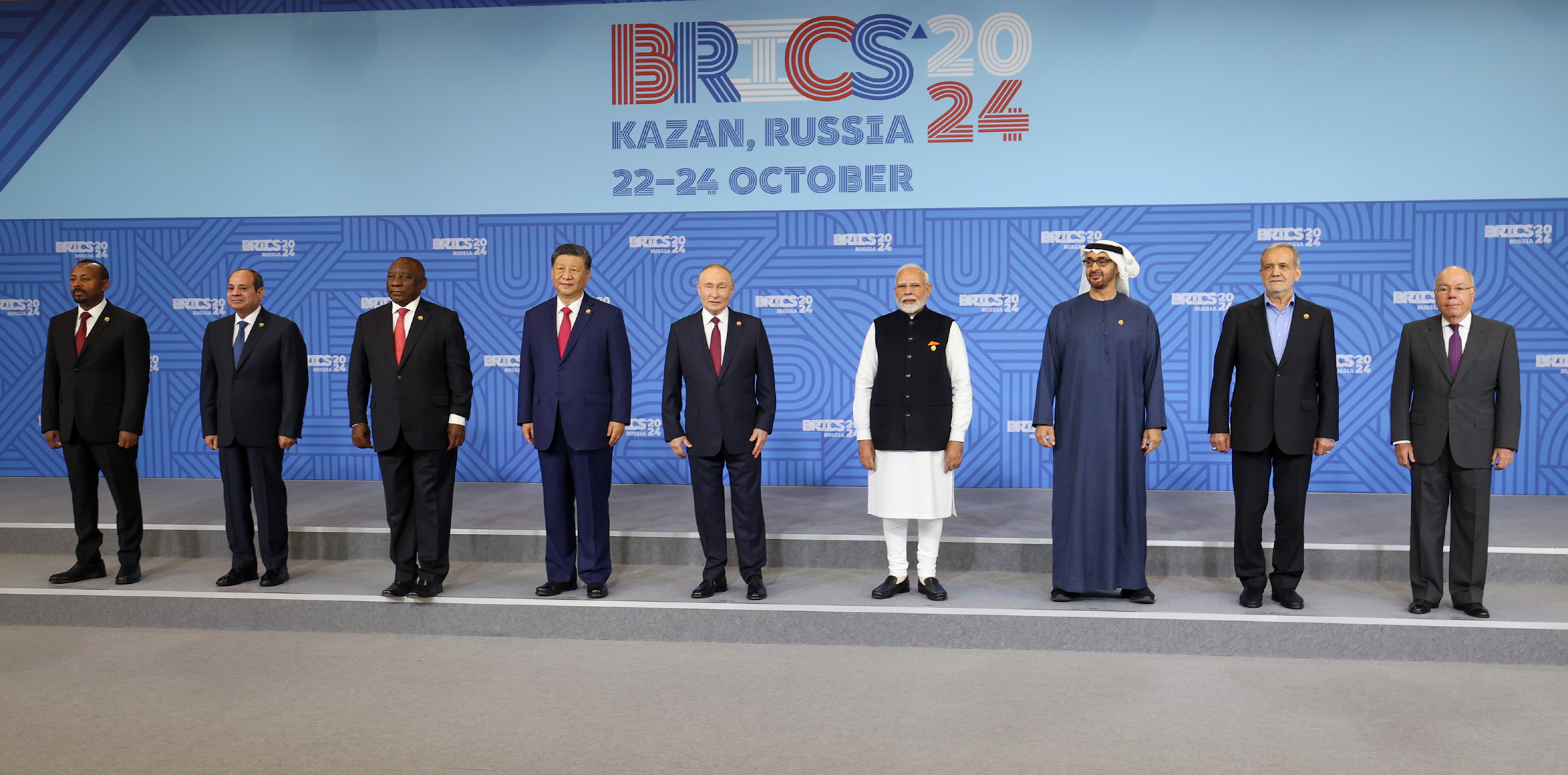
BRICS representatives at the 16th BRICS summit in Kazan, 23 October 2024

- 2005 Bandy World Championship
- 2010 finswimming European championship
- 2011 European Weightlifting Championships
- 2011 Bandy World Championship
- 2013 Summer Universiade
- 2014 European Badminton Championships
- 2015 World Aquatics Championships
- 2016 28th International Olympiad in Informatics
- 2016 European Judo Championships
- 2017 Red Bull Air Race World Championship
- 2017 FIFA Confederations Cup
- 2018 Red Bull Air Race World Championship
- 2018 FIFA World Cup
- 2019 Candidates Tournament for the Women's World Chess Championship 2020
- 2019 WorldSkills Championship
- 2019 BWF World Junior Championships
- 2022 Special Olympics World Winter Games
- 2024 BRICS summit

== International relations ==
Kazan is actively engaged in international activities. The city has foreign diplomatic, trade and cultural representations, the Kazan Kremlin and the Institute of culture of peace are under the auspices of UNESCO, the city participates in partner movements, is a member of the world organisations of cities. The summit of the CIS heads, the Summit of the world security services and other important forums, conferences and events of the world level were held in Kazan. The head of China, the US Secretary of State, about three dozen presidents and Prime Ministers of foreign States paid visits to the capital of the Republic, as to few other cities of the country. Renovated in 2005, the international airport provides flights to dozens of cities in different countries, including the largest airliners (class Boeing 747), and is gradually being rebuilt into a potential hub for the Universiade 2013 and the World Cup 2018; international rail links from the city.

=== Branch offices of embassies ===
- Branch Office of the Embassy of Belarus

=== Consulates ===
Kazan is home to six consulates general.

- Consulate-General of Iran
- Consulate-General of Turkey
- Consulate-General of Hungary
- Consulate-General of The People's Republic of China
- Consulate-General of Kazakhstan
- Consulate-General of Turkmenistan

=== Visa centres ===
- (Italy) Italian Visa Centre in Kazan.
- Joint Visa Application Centre of European Union for:
  - Bulgaria
  - Czech Republic
  - Denmark
  - Finland
  - Greece
  - Iceland
  - Malta
  - Netherlands
  - Spain

=== Twin towns and sister cities ===
Kazan is twinned with:

- Al Minufiyah, Egypt, since 1997
- Al Qalyubiyah (Egypt), since 2001
- Ankara (Turkey), since 2013
- Antalya (Turkey), since 2003
- Braunschweig (Germany), since 1988
- College Station, Texas, United States, since 1990
- Donetsk (Ukraine), since 2002
- Eskişehir (Turkey), since 1997
- Guangzhou (China), since 2012
- Hangzhou (China), since 2002
- Harare (Zimbabwe), since 2011
- Istanbul (Turkey), since 2002
- Astana (Kazakhstan), since 2004
- Shenzhen (China), since 2012
- Tabriz (Iran), since 2009
- Arkadag, Turkmenistan, since 2023

Kazan has also partner relations with the following cities and regions:

- Almaty (Kazakhstan), since 1996
- Arkhangelsk (Russia), since 1999
- Astrakhan (Russia), since 1997
- Baku (Azerbaijan), since 2003
- Bishkek (Kyrgyzstan), since 1998
- Chelyabinsk (Russia), since 2002
- Chengdu (China), since 2015
- Evpatoria (Ukraine), since 1998
- Grozny (Russia), since 2012
- (South Korea) Gwangju (Korea), since 2013
- Ivanovo (Russia), since 1997
- Jūrmala (Latvia), since 2002
- Kabul (Afghanistan), since 2005
- Krasnoyarsk (Russia), since 2001
- Nizhny Novgorod (Russia), since 1997
- Orenburg (Russia), since 2001
- Oryol (Russia), since 2010
- Samara (Russia), since 1998
- Saratov (Russia), since 1999
- Shumen Province (Bulgaria), since 2003
- Tashkent (Uzbekistan), since 1998
- Tlemcen (Algeria), since 2011
- Tyumen (Russia), since 2013
- Ufa (Russia), since 1999
- Ulan-Ude (Russia), since 2003
- Ulyanovsk (Russia), since 1998
- Urbino (Italy), since 2001
- Verona (Italy), since 2011
- Volgograd (Russia), since 2005
- Yaroslavl (Russia), since 2003
- Yoshkar-Ola (Russia), since 2002

=== International organisations membership ===
- Organisation of World Heritage Cities
- United Cities and Local Governments
- Twin Cities International Association
- Historic Cities International Association
- General Conference of Mayors for Peace
- Organisation of Islamic Capitals and Cities (observer)
- Metropolis
- International Assembly of capitals and large cities of CIS

=== Other organisations ===
- Alliance Française
- American Corner

== Notable people ==
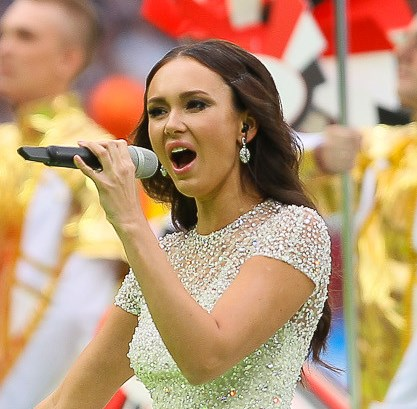
Aida Garifullina, lyric soprano of Volga Tatar descent

- Aida Garifullina, lyric soprano, first prize winner at the Operalia competition in 2013, many performances at Mariinsky Theatre and Vienna State Opera, recording contract with Decca Records
- Venera Gimadieva, operatic soprano, performed leading roles in major European opera houses
- Sofya Gulyak, pianist, only female winner of the Leeds International Piano Competition in 2009
- Dayana Kirillova, singer who represented Russia at the Junior Eurovision Song Contest in 2013
- Rashid Nezhmetdinov, International Master and five-time winner of the Russian Chess Championship
- Kamila Valieva, figure skater
- Veronika Kudermetova (born 24 April 1997), tennis player
- Valery Gerasimov, Chief of the General Staff of the Russian Armed Forces
- Eugenia Volodina, top model

== See also ==
- Arskoe Cemetery
- Kizichesky Monastery
- Russian Islamic University
- Saints Peter and Paul Cathedral (Kazan)
- Aleksandr and Boris Arbuzov House-Museum
