= Aleksandr and Boris Arbuzov House-Museum =

House-museum of Russian chemists Aleksandr and Boris Arbuzov

- Дом-музей академиков А. Е. и Б. А. Арбузовых
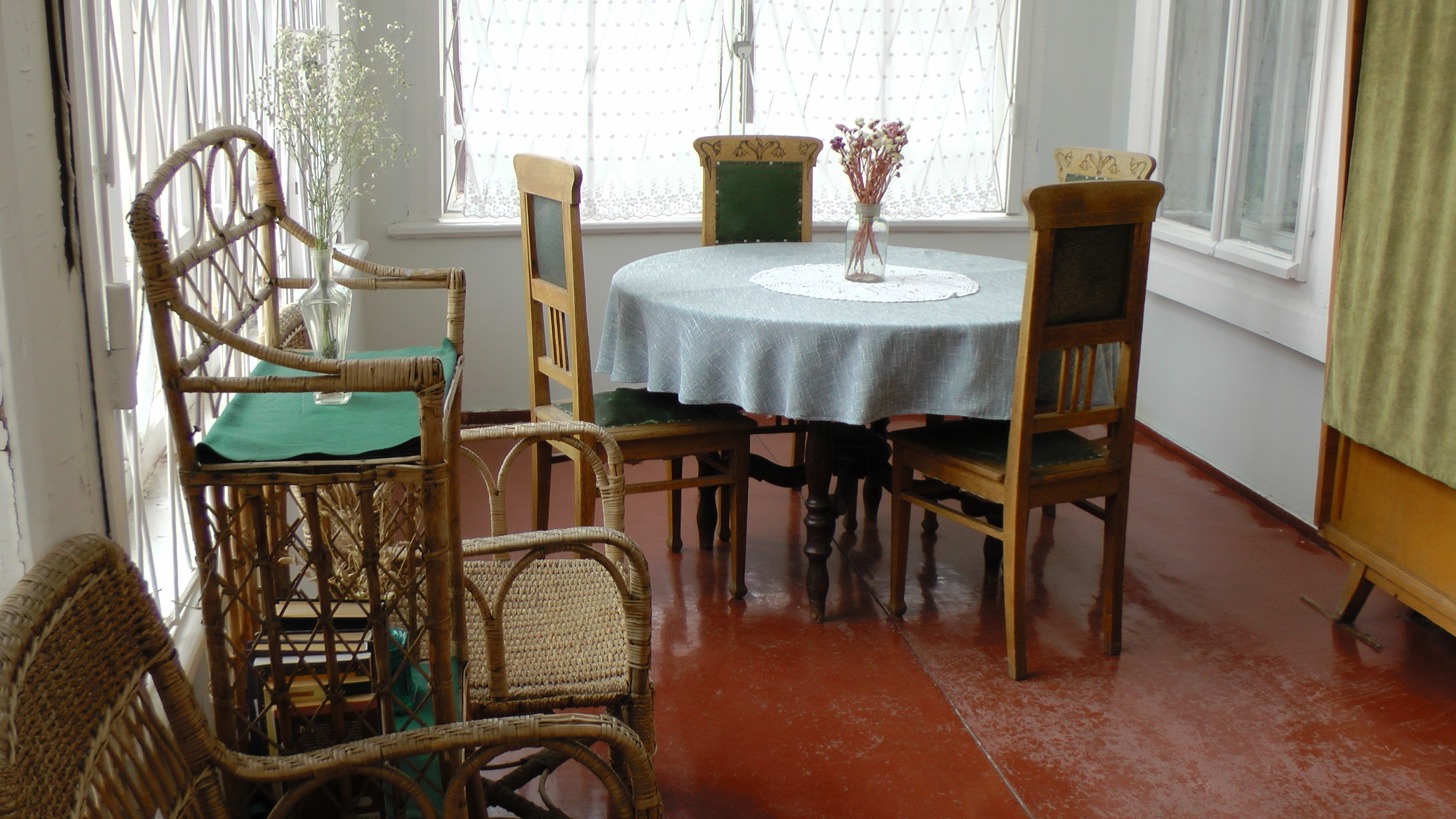
- Aleksandr and Boris Arbuzov House-Museum, porch interior.
- Established: 28 March 1969
- Location: 8 Katanovsky Lane, Kazan, Tatarstan, Russia
- Type: Object of cultural heritage of Russia
- Director: Natalia Koreeva

Aleksandr and Boris Arbuzov House-Museum (Russian: Дом-музе́й акаде́миков А. Е. и Б. А. Арбу́зовых) is a Russian State (departmental) Memorial Museum attached to the A. E. Arbuzov Institute of Organic and Physical Chemistry of the Kazan Scientific Centre of the Russian Academy of Sciences (RAS). It is located in the city of Kazan (Republic of Tatarstan). It specialises in the daily life and scientific activities of outstanding Soviet chemists: academicians Aleksandr Ermingeldovich and Boris Alexandrovich Arbuzovs.

Local historians date the construction of the wooden mansion to 1913. The building was an urban mansion in the style of Russian eclecticism or Art Nouveau. It has never been rebuilt, so the architectural details, the interior layout and the finishing of the rooms have been preserved. The mansion originally belonged to Maria Alexeeva, the niece of the painter Ivan Shishkin. Alexandr Arbuzov moved to this address with his wife and three children in 1916 and lived here until his death in 1968. The house was not owned by the academician: he rented it until the October Revolution, and after nationalisation it became state property.

By the decision of the Presidium of the Academy of Sciences of the USSR of 28 March 1969 the Memorial Museum of Aleksandr Arbuzov was organised here. It was opened on 22 September 1971. On 18 September 2001 (on the tenth anniversary of Boris Arbuzov's death) the Presidium of the Russian Academy of Sciences renamed the museum the Arbuzov House Museum. The exposition of the museum is divided into two sections. The first —historical and biographical— reflects the events of the life, scientific, public and state activity of the academician Arbuzov. The second part —memorial and domestic— includes the living room, the dining room, the bedroom, the office of Boris Arbuzov, the kitchen, the summer porch, which preserves the interiors from the time when the Arbuzov family lived here, and the garden, where Aleksandr Arbuzov used to work.

== Alexandr and Boris Arbuzov and the house on Katanovsky Lane ==
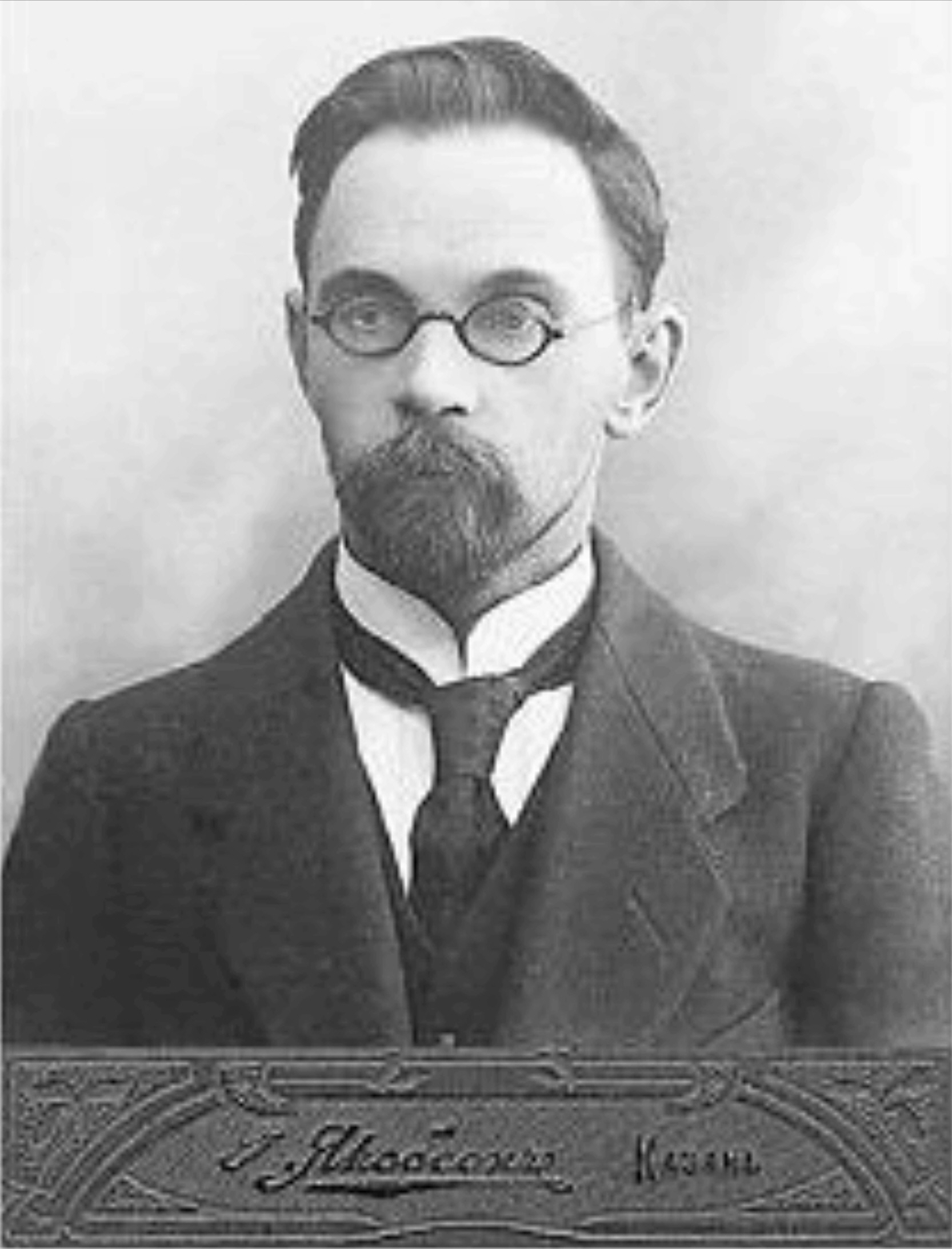
Aleksandr Arbuzov in 1914

Academician Aleksandr Yerminingeldovich Arbuzov settled on Katanovsky Lane with his wife and three children in 1916 and lived there until the end of his life (1968). The authors of the booklet Academician A. E. Arbuzov in Kazan tells that it was, because the academician was a patriarchal and somewhat conservative man. During this period, the apartment was visited by many outstanding scientists and chemists of the time: Nikolay Zelinsky, Alexey Favorsky, Sergey Reformatsky, Alexei Chichibabin, Vyacheslav Tishchenko, Nikolai Kurnakov and others.

By 1916 Aleksandr Arbuzov was already widely recognised as an important chemical scientist. In 1910, he travelled to Germany, France, Switzerland and Italy to study the state of research in organic chemistry in those countries. In 1911, Arbuzov won an all-Russian competition for the position of Professor Extraordinary at the Imperial Kazan University and from then on became Head of the Department of Organic Chemistry. In 1915 he presented his doctoral thesis On the phenomena of catalysis in the field of transformations of some phosphorus compounds and was confirmed as an ordinariate professor of that university. The house in Katanovsky Lane did not belong to him: he rented it until the October Revolution, and after nationalisation the house became state property.

The academician's daughter Irina described 1918 and 1919 as a difficult time for the family. During the artillery bombardments of the city, the father sent the children to the cellar of the house, and the change of power the household learned about in the form of detachments entering the city. A document issued by the house committee to Arbuzov on 29 March 1920 has survived:

I submit herewith the certificate of the House Committees requesting the issuance of a warrant for the delivery of shoes and galoshes to the following employees of the factory of Arbuzov Alexandr. [Signed, stamped]. Appendix: Certificate of the House Committee of the 3rd Gymnasium Lane. I hereby certify that Mr. Arbuzov, Aleksandr Ermingeldovich, who lives at No. 8, Square 3, 3rd Gymnasium Lane, has never received rubber shoes or boots. 29 March 1920. Chairman of the House Committee [Signed, stamped].

During the Second World War, the academicians' family consisted of 11 people of different ages (the youngest son Yuri and his family returned to Kazan from Moscow at that time, and daughter Irina from Leningrad). Nevertheless, Aleksandr Arbuzov sheltered the families of the academicians Aleksandr Fersman and Aleksandr Frumkin, evacuated from Moscow. In the dining room they assembled a Russian stove for cooking and heating the apartment. Fersman later recalled: "...those were difficult times, but the gathering under one roof of beautiful, kind people made life easier". The academician's friend and biographer, Candidate of Chemical Sciences Nikolai Grechkin wrote that Aleksandr Arbuzov's holidays were active. He did not sit around doing nothing: he was engaged in literary work, listened to the news on the radio and then shared it with family members, thought... Vera Zoroastrova, candidate of chemical sciences, who knew the academician well and often visited his home, said:

The furniture of the apartment was simple, even austere. There was no luxury there. There was a complete absence of what we call bourgeoisie. In the living room, which was also used as a study, there was a large antique desk, a big piano, a bookcase, a shelf with books, notes, folders. On the walls were pictures of nature, painted by the academician in his youth... It was a family tradition to celebrate the birthday of Ekaterina Petrovna [the academician's wife]... The festive dinner was followed by tea, at which A. E. Arbuzov himself prepared sandwiches and served jam and sweets. At home, Aleksandr Yerminingeldovich was always friendly, cordial, hospitable and simple. He loved to talk about his teachers, about Russian scientists, many of whom he knew personally. He recalled episodes from his student days.

Lyalya Mukhamedova recalled that guests at the Arbuzovs' house were always worried about how to behave in the presence of scientists. The stiffness quickly disappeared under the influence of the hosts' hospitality, the relaxed atmosphere that prevailed in the house on Shkolnaya Street.

The authors of the guide to the house museum noted that the family atmosphere of the Arbuzovs was characterised by warmth, "modesty, dignity and high personal culture". In the ornamental garden next to the house, Aleksandr Arbuzov planted shrubs, trees and perennial flowers. The scientist was particularly proud of the parma violets he had grown himself, which bloomed twice a year. Fazilya Valitova, an employee of the Institute of Physics and Technology of the Kazan Branch of the USSR Academy of Sciences, recalled: "Aleksandr Ermingeldovich loved flowers, admired their beauty, called them wonders of nature. In a small garden near the house he planted flowers, watered them and took care of them. In early spring, A.E. Arbuzov would bring fragrant Parma violets from this garden to the laboratory". Aleksandr Arbuzov's eldest son, Boris, also took care of the garden, but according to chemical scientist Lyalya Yuldasheva, he preferred rose hips and jasmine.

== The museum's building ==
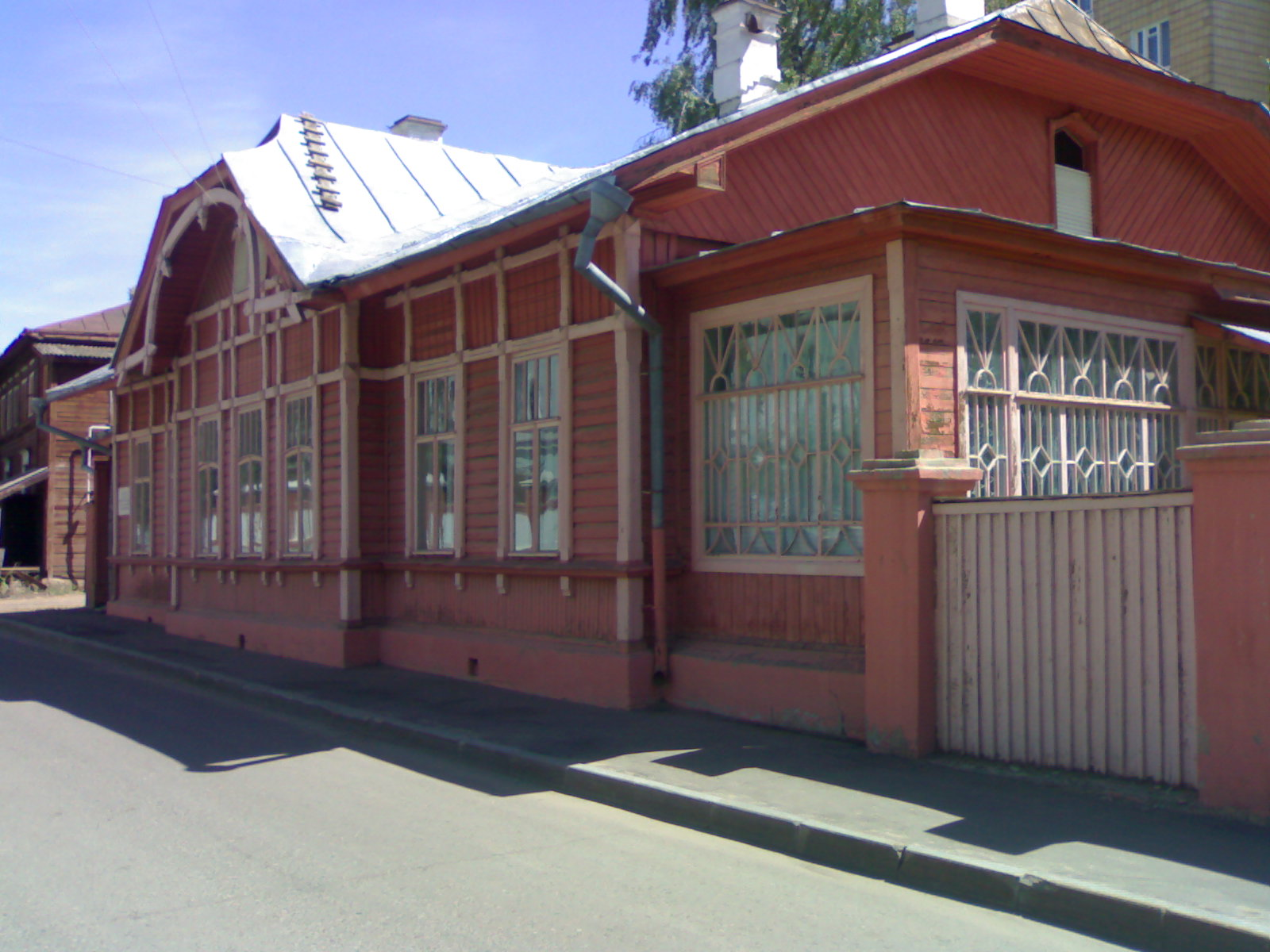
The Arbuzov House-Museum's building

The construction of the wooden mansion on Katanovsky Lane (in tsarist times it was called Lane of the 3rd Gymnasium, in Soviet times it was called Shkolny) in Kazan is dated by local historians to 1913. (Note: There was another point of view, according to which the mansion was built at the end of the 19th century.) The building was an urban estate in the style of Russian eclecticism or Art Nouveau. The illustrated catalogue Objects of Cultural Heritage of the Republic of Tatarstan, published in 2020, describes the building as an example of late Art Nouveau and an imitation of half-timbered architecture. It has never been rebuilt, so the architectural details, interior layout and finishing of the rooms have been preserved. The villa originally belonged to Maria Alexeeva, the niece of the painter Ivan Shishkin. The villa occupies an area of 285 square metres, and together with the memorial garden — 590. It is an object of cultural heritage of the Republic of Tatarstan in accordance with Resolution 320 of the Council of Ministers of the Tatar ASSR of 27 July 1987 (Note: In the resolution itself (in the wording of the Resolution of the Cabinet of Ministers of the Republic of Tatarstan № 412 of 19 August 2005) the address of the building is given as 9/8 Mayakovsky St. and it is stated that in 1931-1934 the composer Farit Yarullin allegedly lived here, and only in 1938-1968 the residence of the family of the academician Alexander Arbuzov is mentioned. This error was repeated in some later editions, for example in the book Kazan in Monuments of History and Culture, published in 1982.) and Resolution 188 of the Cabinet of Ministers of the Republic of Tatarstan of 15 April 1993 On the transition of historical and cultural monuments of republican (Russian Federation) significance to monuments of historical and cultural significance of the Republic of Tatarstan.

== The museum's exposition and funds' creation ==
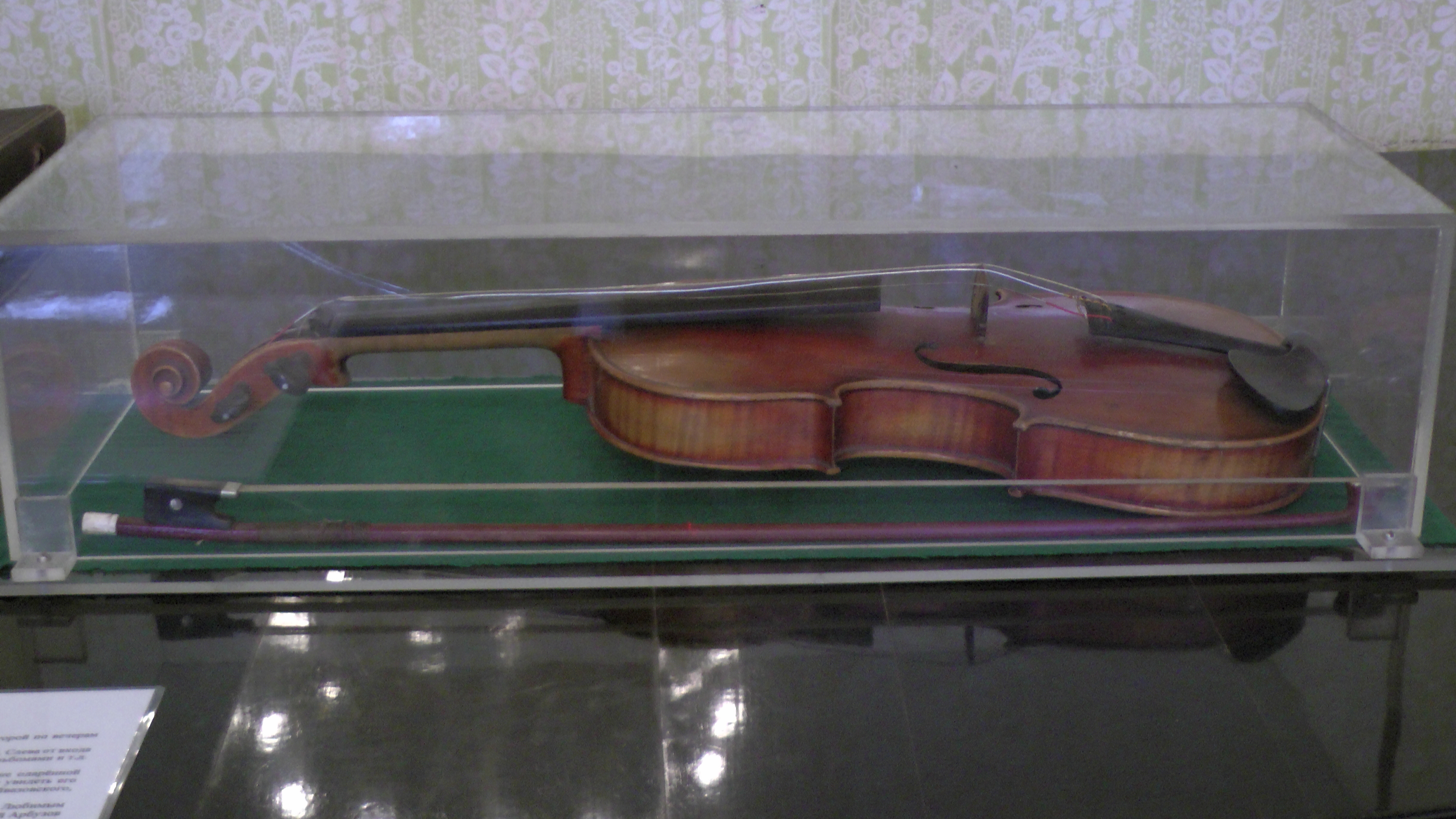
Musical instruments of Alexandr Arbuzov in the exposition of the House-Museum

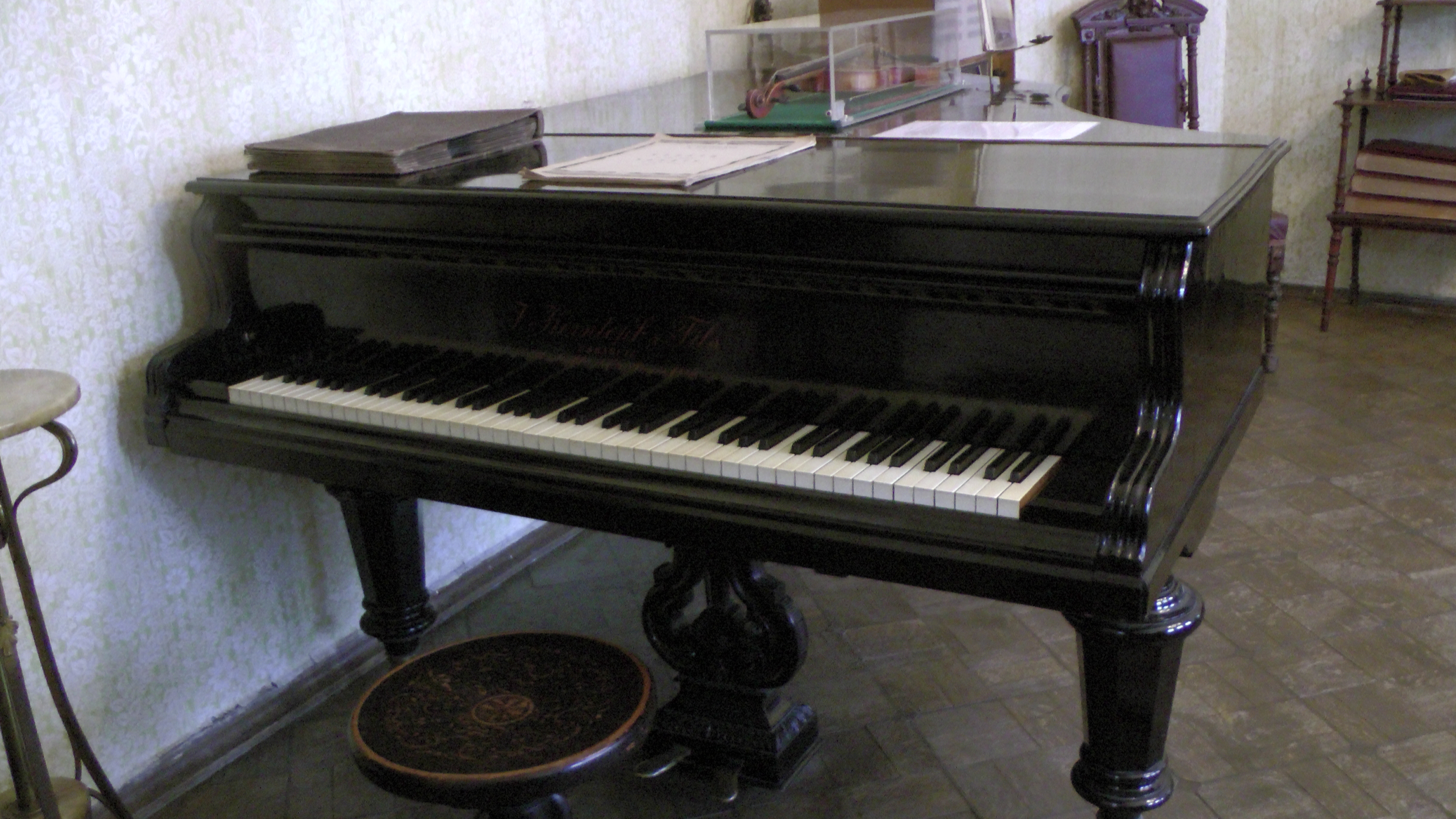
Musical instruments of Aleksandr Arbuzov in the exposition of the House-Museum

The academician Aleksandr Arbuzov lived here from 1916 to 1968. By the decision of the Presidium of the USSR Academy of Sciences of 28 March 1969, a memorial museum in his honor was organised there. It was opened on 22 September 1971. The initiators of the creation of the house museum were Aleksandr Arbuzov's three children, who were well-known chemists. The first excursion was led by Aleksandr Arbuzov's eldest son, the academician Boris Alexandrovich Arbuzov. Since he lived in the building with his father until 1955, on 18 September 2001 (the tenth anniversary of Boris Arbuzov's death) the Presidium of the Russian Academy of Sciences renamed the museum the House Museum of Academicians A. E. and B. A. Arbuzov. Even earlier, in 1993, the Memorial Museum reconstructed Boris Arbuzov's office and created an exposition dedicated to the scientist.

Most of the museum's funds and expositions were donated by Boris Arbuzov at the time of its foundation. In 1988, the museum received some of Aleksandr Arbuzov's scientific works, a collection of photographs and a scientific library from the widow of Professor Yuri Arbuzov (Aleksandr Arbuzov's youngest son), Natalia Yelagina (according to another version, this happened immediately after Yuri's death in 1971). In 1992, Boris Arbuzov's daughter Marina Borisovna donated her father's personal belongings to the collection: scientific journals, manuscripts of his scientific works, commemorative plaques and medals. In 1998-2013 the museum was enriched with items from the Arbuzov family archive, donated by A. N. Grechkin — the son of Aleksandr Arbuzov's pupil and biographer N.P. Grechkin.

At present the collections of the Aleksandr and Boris Arbuzov House-Museum are completed by personalities. They include: the fund of Academician Aleksandr Arbuzov, the fund of Academician Boris Arbuzov, the fund of Candidate of Chemical Sciences Nikolai Grechkin, the fund of Doctor of Chemical Sciences Yuri Arbuzov, the fund of Doctor of Chemical Sciences Irina Arbuzova (after her death in January 1989, Boris Arbuzov donated her documents, manuscripts, photographs and some of her scientific articles), the fund of Russian and Soviet architect Karl Müfke (Müfke was the husband of Aleksandr Arbuzov's sister Natalia), the fund of Marina Arbuzova (granddaughter of Aleksandr Arbuzov), and the scientific auxiliary fund. By 1 January 2017, the main collection of the museum contained 27,431 items, and the scientific and auxiliary collection contained 1,079 items. By 1 January 2021, the museum's main collection had grown to 28,322 items and the scientific auxiliary collection to 1,113 items.

The most valuable in the fund are the furniture of the end of the 19th and the beginning of the 20th century (50 shelves), the library of the academician Arbuzov (including books with gift inscriptions) — about 5000 shelves, the paintings of Aleksandr Arbuzov (6 shelves), the correspondence of the academician Arbuzov with Soviet and foreign scientists (more than 2000 shelves). The search for letters whose author or addressee was Aleksandr Arbuzov, as well as evidence of his social activities for the funds and exposition of the museum was carried out by a former student of Arbuzov — Nikolai Grechkin.

Currently, the house museum of academicians A.E. and B.A. Arbuzov is on the balance sheet of the A.E. Arbuzov Institute of Organic and Physical Chemistry of the Kazan Scientific Centre of the Russian Academy of Sciences.

At different times the museum was run on a voluntary basis by F. G. Valitova, V. M. Zoroastrova, N. P. Grechkin, N. A. Chadaeva. It was not until 1 November 1986, when a staff unit was allocated. For 24 years the director of the museum was Nadezhda Mikhailovna Gaidukova, a graduate of the Chemistry Department of the Kazan State University. In 2022 the House Museum of Academicians A. E. and B. A. Arbuzovs has three employees — the director of the museum, a graduate of the History Faculty of Kazan State University, N. S. Koreyeva, and the curators of the funds: a graduate of the Faculty of Social and Humanitarian Technologies of the Kazan State Technical University, M.S. Ogorodnikova, and a graduate of the Faculty of Museology of the Kazan Federal University, Elvira Iskhakova. The main activities of the museum:

- acquisition, storage and accounting of funds;
- conducting excursions, thematic evenings, development of museum-pedagogical programs;
- conducting research work with the funds.

The House Museum is a member of the Association of Museums of Tatarstan (R2223).

The exposition of the museum is divided into two sections. The first —historical and biographical— reflects the events of the life, scientific, public and state activity of the academician Arbuzov. The second part —memorial and domestic— includes the living room, the dining room, the bedroom, the office of Boris Arbuzov, the kitchen, the summer porch, and the garden. The total exhibition area of the museum is 150.2 square metres. During its existence, the museum has been visited by guests from Poland, Germany, France, Italy, Great Britain, the United States and Japan. The authors of the guide to the museum called it not only a tribute to great scientists, but also a source of knowledge, experience and patriotism for its visitors.

=== The historical and biographical section ===
The exposition of the museum begins in the room that acquaints the visitors with the biography and the main stages of scientific activity of Aleksandr and Boris Arbuzov. Documents, photos, books and manuscripts are collected here. The exposition is divided into several sections. The first of them is devoted to the scientist's childhood, his parents, studies at the gymnasium (the issues of the magazine Niva for 1882, on which the future academician learned to read), the second section — studies at the Kazan University. The following sections reflect different aspects of the academician's activity: Research (e.g. presented glass apparatuses designed and made by Arbuzov himself), (Note: Alexandr Arbuzov is the author of the book Guide to the Independent Study of the Art of Glassblowing. The first edition — 1912, the second (expanded) 1934 (according to Lozovoy, the year of reprinting — 1928), in the magazine Chemistry and Life fragments of this book were printed in 1984. He learned the basic techniques of this art in 2-3 weeks as a student, but perfected and developed them over many years. Even as a world-famous scientist, Alexandr Arbuzov occasionally made glass equipment for experiments.) pedagogical, state (until 1967 Arbuzov was elected five times as a deputy of the Supreme Soviet of the USSR, and in 1958 even opened its session as the oldest among the participating deputies, he is a Hero of Socialist Labour, was awarded five Orders of Lenin and the Order of the Red Banner of Labour) and public (his public lectures, which attracted significant audiences and were accompanied by demonstrations of experiments in front of workers and students of various universities in Kazan). A separate section of the exhibition is entitled Kazan is the Cradle of Russian Organic Chemistry, demonstrating the continuity of traditions from Nikolay Zinin to the present day.

The modern biographical section of the exposition was created in 2003 for the 100th anniversary of Boris Arbuzov's birth, funded by the Museum Council of the Russian Academy of Sciences. It was created by a team of authors consisting of E. I. Kartashyova, G. A. Volodina, N. M. Gaidukova, N. S. Koreyeva, who were responsible for the concept and content of the exposition; A. S. Ugarov, O. R. Gasimov, A. A. Ugarov, who created its design; I. M. Yusupov, who was responsible for the photographs.

=== The memorial section ===
==== Hallway ====
The memorial exposition begins in the entrance hall, where the personal belongings of the Arbuzov family are exhibited: a chest, a chest of drawers, an oil lamp and a bust of the Russian fable writer Ivan Krylov. The illustrated catalogue Objects of the Cultural Heritage of the Republic of Tatarstan did not include the entrance hall among the rooms that have preserved the memorial interior. The same position was taken by the booklet published in 1977.

==== Living room ====
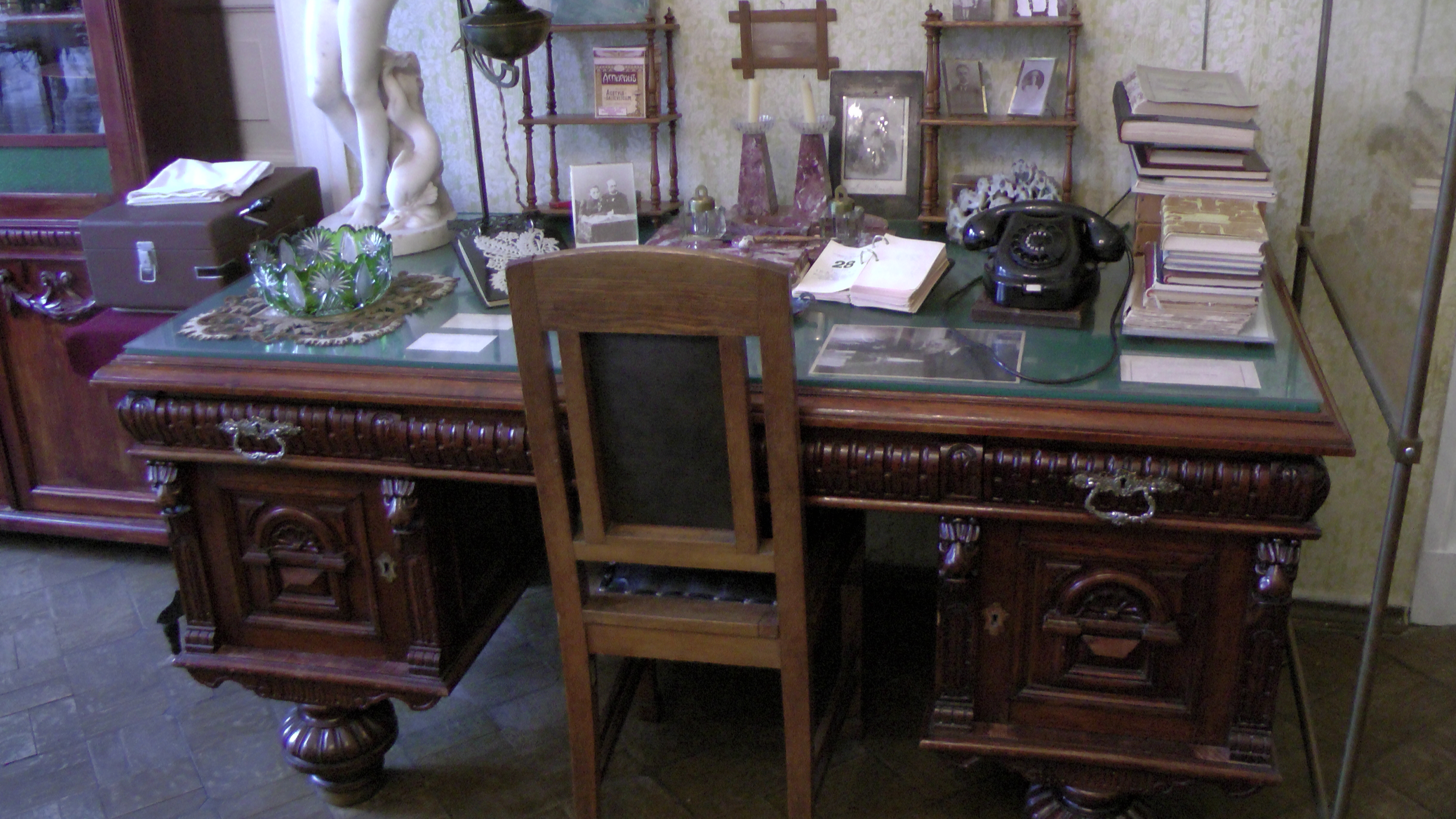
Alexandr Arbuzov's desk

The living room and at the same time the study of Aleksandr Arbuzov (Note: In the Museum of History of the Kazan State Technical University houses the memorial office of Alexandr Arbuzov. When the question arose how to combine the detailed preserved interior with the need to place in the room modern showcases designed to display original documents (photographs, personal belongings, books and scientific articles written by him) illustrating the life and work of the scientist, several projects were developed to solve this problem. The best among them was the project of the artist Evgeny Makarov. The problem of identification of Alexandr Arbuzov's contemporaries depicted in a large number of photos, dating of the photos, clarification of dates and events of the shooting became a serious task. Hilm Kamai, the academician's first doctoral student, was of great help in this matter. He also brought some of his laboratory equipment, handmade by Alexandr Arbuzov.) was a place of evening gatherings of the whole family of the academician. Aleksandr Arbuzov had no separate office. In the living room, near the door, there is a massive desk, at which he and engaged in household chores. The academician believed that the pursuit of science should be limited to working hours and the laboratory, while the house, in his opinion, existed for recreation. He said:

I can't imagine a chemist who isn't familiar with the heights of poetry, with the images of the masters of painting, with good literature. He is unlikely to create anything significant in his field.

In the article Is it necessary to argue? (1963) about the problem of the correlation between science and passion for art in the life of a scientist, Arbuzov wrote:

... for the successful performance and maintenance of the tone of the main activity of this or that specialist, as physiology teaches, it is necessary, at least for a short period, to have some change of activity and impressions, whether it be a walk, i.e. staying in the air, sport or, as I said, a moderate and reasonable passion for various kinds of art. I have made extensive use of all these forms of interruption and diversion from my main activity, which is scientific work.

Candidate of Technical Sciences A.S. Lozovoy, who was once the deputy scientific director of the museum of the Kazan National Research Technological University, preserved a description of the living room during the lifetime of Academician Aleksandr Arbuzov in 1965. At that time there were two grand pianos (Note: The Kazan scholar, chemist and artist Andrei Visel noted that Boris Arbuzov, after separating from his parents, arranged his own apartment in the same way: the living room in his apartment on the second floor of 3 School Lane served as both a dining room and a workroom for his daughter Marina (who gave music lessons here to her students), Alexander Arbuzov's granddaughter. He also wrote about the two pianos, which he said took up more than half the room. They were covered with music, books and art albums, and there were flowers. A large antique table stretched from the window to the door. Biscuits, jam and sweets, which were always on it, awaited guests for tea. Landscapes hung on the walls. Visel noticed: "Here there was no shadow of pedantic, lifeless and primitive order. Here was the spirit of an intelligent, creative, intense life". It was in the living room that Boris Arbuzov usually received his guests. At the same time, dishes were usually pushed aside on the dining table and business papers were laid out on it. When the papers were put away, tea was served and small talk began with his wife and daughter. Visel did not know whether Alexandr Arbuzov's eldest son worked in the salon when his guests were away.) (Note: The biography of Alexander Arbuzov by Nikolai Grechkin and Vladimir Kuznetsov, published by Nauka in 1977, even states: "The scientist's apartment was full of musical instruments: at one time there were three grand pianos and a piano. They were played by Ekaterina Petrovna and Marina — Boris Alexandrovich's daughter".) in the room, with dozens of stacks of scientific journals on top of them. Among them was the academician's favourite violin. On the antique desk where, at Lozovoy's request, Arbuzov had written an address to the schoolchildren taking part in the First All-Russian Olympiad of Schoolchildren in Chemistry, there was a sculpture of Venus and dozens of unopened envelopes with unread correspondence. Soft armchairs with white covers and bookcases attracted attention. Among the things the owner proudly showed the visitor was Aleksandr Arbuzov's gymnasium diary for 1893. Lozovoy was surprised by the neatness of the diary: lessons, homework, calligraphic handwriting, and different marks.

Music concerts, theatre performances, competitions and charades were organised in the living room. On New Year's Eve, a Christmas tree was set up in the living room. Doctor of Chemistry Nina Polezhaeva recalled that at the Arbuzovs' New Year celebrations, the eldest of the academician's sons always played Ded Moroz, who gave presents to all the guests. A festive programme was prepared beforehand, including sketches, charades, congratulations and lots of dancing. The core of the guests in Polezhaeva's time were the peers of Boris Arbuzov's daughter Marina. They were musicians, chemists, physicists and mathematicians. Holidays were "interesting, entertaining and fun". Aleksandr Arbuzov and his wife were not left out.

Lyalya Mukhamedova remembered a game of charades. Boris Arbuzov was the ringleader and the soul of the company. Several people would guess a word and act out its individual syllables, then the word as a whole. The audience had to guess. In one of the charades, Boris Arbuzov played a jackal. He was given a tail and moved around the living room on all fours. When the charade was related to the word "chocolate", a group of young people first portrayed sinners in hell and then showed a chocolate bar.

In the spacious room there is a massive oak desk. On it are a lamp with a silk lampshade, a writing utensil, a paperweight, a telephone and photographs of loved ones, as well as a sculpture of Venus that belonged to the scientist. The room contains a trundle bed and a bookshelf with reference books. The interior of the room also includes a sofa, armchairs, a coffee table, a desk of Aleksandr Arbuzov's wife Ekaterina Petrovna, an antique chandelier and lamps. The shelves are lined with sheet music, gramophone records and albums. An important place in the interior is occupied by an antique clock with a British chime.

Aleksandr Arbuzov was a man of learning. In the living room of the memorial there are watercolours painted by the scientist in his youth. They were copies of reproductions by Russian landscape painters Ivan Aivazovsky and Arkhip Kuindzhi. The academician's lyrical landscapes were painted in watercolour and oil. In an autobiographical article, Arbuzov confirmed that he did not copy the original works, but colour postcards. Among the paintings presented in the house museum there are also independent works of the academician. These works were seen by the Kazan artist Kondrat Maksimov, who stated that he would like to take their author to his art gallery. Kondrat Maksimov himself left a testimony about Aleksandr Arbuzov's visit first to his personal exhibition in Kazan and then to his art studio. The academician was interested in the technology of making oil paints, the process of the artist's work on paintings, and bought from him a number of sketches for the works presented at the exhibition, as well as several still lifes. Unlike his sisters, Aleksandr Arbuzov was not trained as a painter, but his works were positively evaluated by experts.

In the living room there were photo albums with black and white and colour pictures taken by Aleksandr Arbuzov. Lozovoy, whom the academician showed them to, noted the "elegance and love" with which the photographs had been taken. He concluded that photography was one of the academician's hobbies. The assumption was confirmed when the House Museum received hundreds of negatives of photographs taken by the scientist.

The exhibition includes one of the violins that belonged to the academician (as a child he studied at the private music school of the conductor and composer Aleksandr Orlov-Sokolovsky), and a Polish grand piano J. Kerntopf & Fils (on which Arbuzov was accompanied at family concerts by the academician's granddaughter Marina, who became a music teacher). Aleksandr Arbuzov owned several violins. He kept his childhood violin as a souvenir. He considered the most valuable in his collection to be a violin by the famous French master Jean Baptiste Vuillaume from the 1850s. Contemporaries also mentioned another violin by Aleksandr Arbuzov, the work of the outstanding Austrian master Jacob Stainer. It was the one that usually stood on top of the grand piano in the living room. Books from his library on the history of the violin, the theory of violin playing and the technology of violin making testify to the seriousness with which the scientist approached his hobby. Arbuzov's archive contains correspondence in which he acts as an expert for the nomination of the Bolshoi Theatre's musical instrument workshop for the USSR State Prize. To an interlocutor in a domestic setting, the academician could give an impromptu lecture "on the materials and fine details of the shape of violins necessary for good performance, on the secrets of the art of the old violin masters".

The scientist dreamed of forming a string quartet from members of his family — the children were taught music. Boris Arbuzov himself did not play any musical instruments, but he was always present at home concerts, visited concert halls and loved classical music. His wife Olga Andreevna and daughter Marina were visited by amateur musicians who arranged improvised ensembles. Aleksandr Arbuzov participated in an amateur string quartet of his colleagues. The writer Rafael Mirgazizov claimed that the quartet was formed in 1925, with the scientist playing the second violin. A professional musician was invited to play the first violin. Aleksandr Arbuzov himself, however, claimed that this quartet (professional violinist Zhilonsky, Arbuzov and his two students) was formed much earlier, even before the revolution, when he was working at the New Alexandria Agricultural Institute, and that another was organised in Kazan, in which he and two of his students participated, with the cello part played by Professor Vladimir Burgsdorf of Kazan University. S. I. Polikarpov even gave the names of these two students: N. L. Parfentiev and V. V. Evlampiev. During the Second World War, Arbuzov organised concerts in military units and hospitals in the city, and founded an amateur symphony orchestra. In one of his public lectures, he spoke about the scientific activities of Aleksandr Borodin and then performed his Quartet No.2 with his colleagues from the University of Kazan. When the academician could no longer play the violin due to his age, he gave introductory speeches at concerts held at the Kazan branch of the USSR Academy of Sciences. Aleksandr Arbuzov's archive contained diplomas awarded to him at amateur music competitions. Aleksandr Arbuzov possessed an article on Borodin's life and work, published in 1958 in the newspaper Young Stalinist, "which would do honour to any professional musicologist".

==== Dining room ====
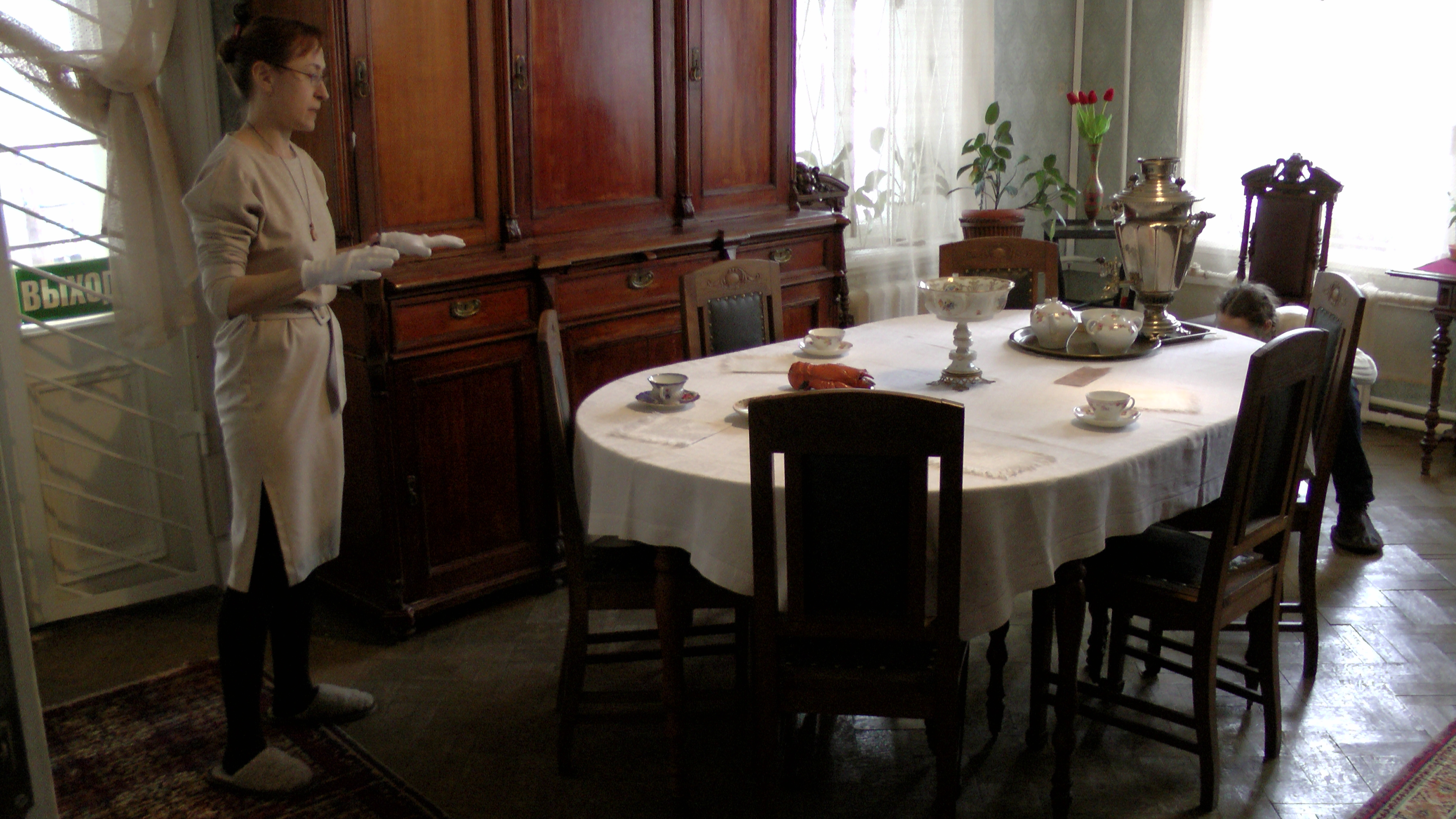
The Arbuzov family's dining room

In the centre of the dining room is a large dining table. Each member of the family had their own crockery, which is on display in the exhibition. The interior is completed by an antique clock with a pendulum, a lomber table, a sideboard, a bookcase where books on chemistry are next to works on local history, history and fiction (all the books in the bookcase have gift inscriptions from the authors to Aleksandr Arbuzov), as well as indoor flowers tended by Ekaterina Arbuzova. In the dining room there is an oven with a stove. During the Second World War the family of the academician lived in this room.

Doctor of Chemistry Islam Alizadeh recalled a scene that took place in this room: "Ekaterina Petrovna was setting the table. Aleksandr Ermingeldinovich asked for another drink. His wife refused because the doctor had not told her to drink. — "Just a little, one shot, because Islam Gafarovich has arrived".

==== Porch ====
From the dining room, the exhibition leads to the summer porch, where there is a table, wicker cottage furniture, a sofa and a carpentry workbench on which Aleksandr Arbuzov worked. The porch leads to a garden with ornamental plants.

==== Boris Arbuzov's study ====
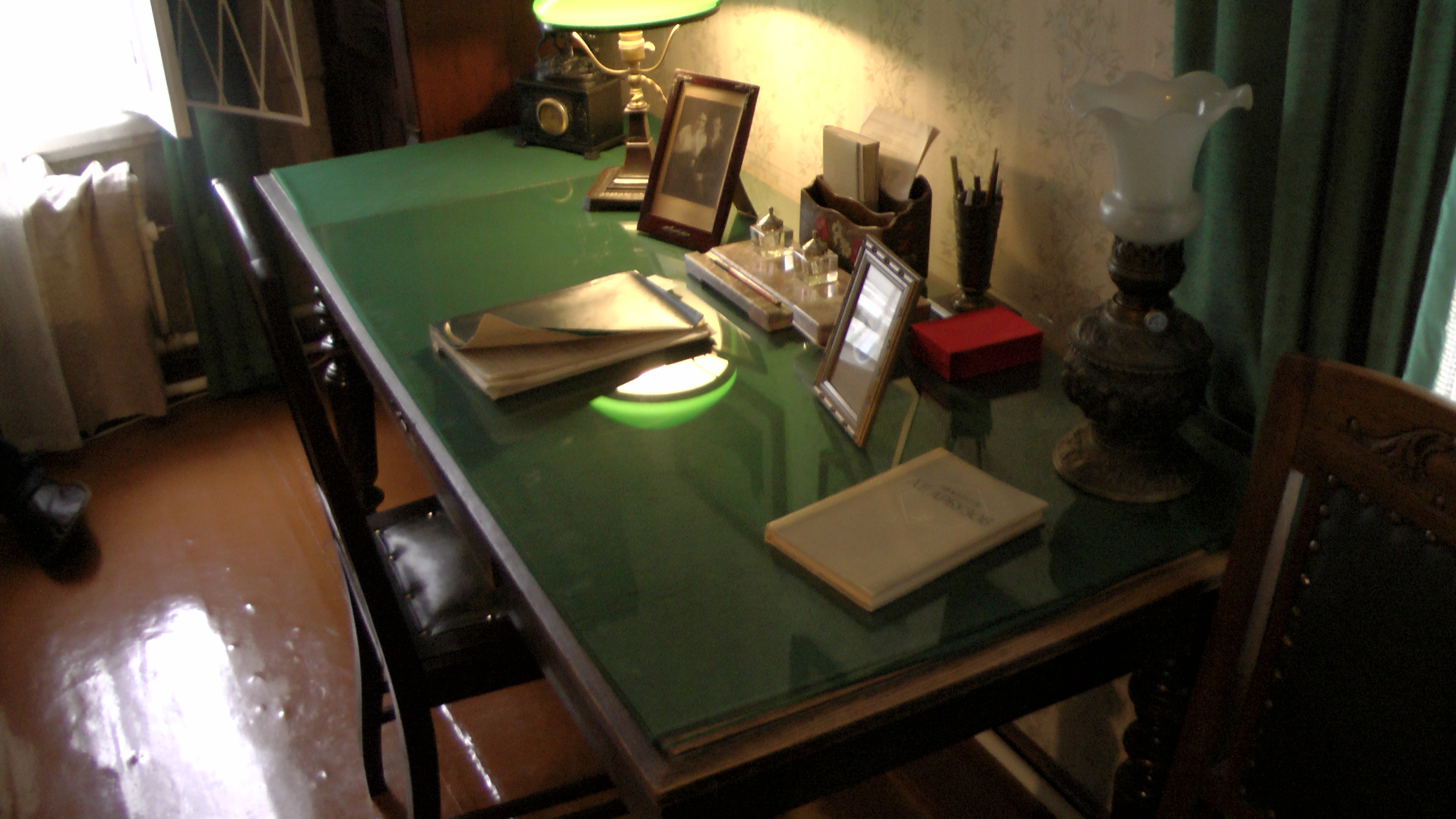
Boris Arbuzov's desk in his study

In the modern memorial exposition of the house museum there is an office of the eldest son of Aleksandr Arbuzov — academician Boris Arbuzov. The exposition presents his personal belongings: a desk, a bookcase, landscape photo sketches made by Boris Alexandrovich (he was fond of photography), in the showcase you can see his commemorative medals and awards. The academician's camera and photographic enlarger are on display. The modern interior differs from the time when Boris Alexandrovich lived here. Then all the walls were filled with bookshelves. Boris Arbuzov read a lot, both fiction and researches. Lyalya Yuldasheva recalled that after reading a book about Mayan culture in the evening, he would talk about his impressions of it the next morning. (Note: Andrei Visel visited Boris Arbuzov in his office in another apartment at Shkolny 3. Even there, Visel noticed the small size of the office - it barely contained a desk and cupboards full of books. There were piles of magazines on the windowsill and even on the floor. Visel noticed that, unlike in the living room, Boris practically never talked about work in the study, and that the scientist's desk at home was very different from the one in his office at the institute. At home it was cluttered with books, files and notes, while at work it was practically empty. Business papers were scattered around the edge of the desk. The memoirist assumed that Boris Arbuzov's creative activity took place at home, and that he only "did his 'home work'" at the Institute.)

==== Aleksandr Arbuzov's bedroom ====
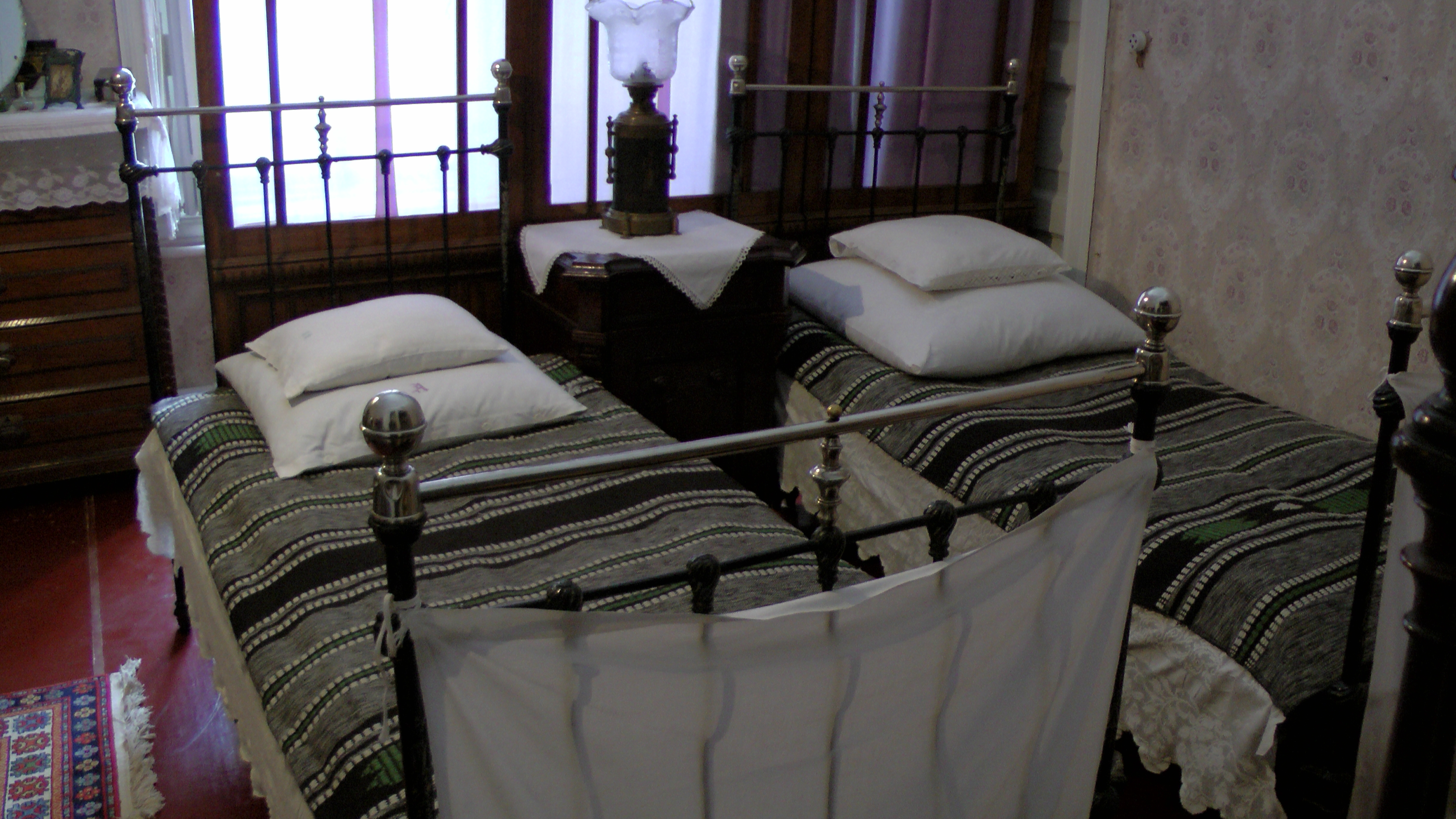
A bedroom in the house-museum of Alexandr and Boris Arbuzov

The bedroom is characterised by its asceticism. Its interior is completely preserved: two modest beds, a folding screen, wardrobes, a marble washbasin, a commode, a table on which stands a typewriter. In the room there is also a sewing machine of the American company Singer, for which the academician's wife worked. Ekaterina Arbuzova herself was involved in the children's education, gave them lessons and taught them French, which she knew perfectly. The death of his wife in 1962 was a heavy blow for the academician. He resigned from the Institute of Chemical Technology and began to withdraw from scientific activity. In the last years of his life Aleksandr Arbuzov spent a lot of time in this room. He read a lot, especially magazines and works of 19th century Russian literature. Books and Soviet magazines are displayed on a shelf in the exposition.

==== Kitchen ====
In the kitchen, a Russian stove, a ZIS Moscow refrigerator and kitchen utensils that belonged to the scientist's family have been preserved. The booklet Academician A. E. Arbuzov in Kazan, published in 1977, which summarises the description of the interiors of the academician's apartment, concludes about the great modesty of its owner: "The main thing for him was science and related educational and social activities".

== Bibliography ==
=== Legal documents ===
- Постановление Совета Министров Татарской АССР от 27.07.1987 N 320 «О включении в список памятников истории и культуры объектов г. Казани» (в редакции Постановления Кабинета Министров Республики Татарстан от 19.08.2005 N 412) [Resolution of the Council of Ministers of the Tatar ASSR of 27.07.1987 N 320 "On Inclusion of Kazan Objects in the List of Historical and Cultural Monuments" (as amended by the Resolution of the Cabinet of Ministers of the Republic of Tatarstan of 19.08.2005 N 412)] (in Russian). Казань. 2005.
- Постановление Кабинета Министров Республики Татарстан «О переходе памятников истории и культуры республиканского (Российская Федерация) значения к памятникам истории и культуры республиканская (Республика Татарстан) значения» № 188 от 15.04.1993 [Resolution of the Cabinet of Ministers of the Republic of Tatarstan "On Transferring Historical and Cultural Monuments of Republican (Russian Federation) Significance to Monuments of Historical and Cultural Significance of the Republic of Tatarstan" No. 188 from 15.04.1993.] (in Russian). Казань. 1993. Archived from the original on 2022-04-07.

=== Memories of A. E. and B. A. Arbuzovs ===
- Ali-zade, I. G. (1985). "Воспоминания о Александре Арбузове". Академик А. Е. Арбузов (мировоззрение, наука, жизнь) [Academician A. E. Arbuzov (world vision, science, life)] (in Russian). Казань: Татарское книжное издательство. pp. 185–190.
- Arbuzov, A. E. (1985). "Надо ли ссориться?". Академик А. Е. Арбузов (мировоззрение, наука, жизнь) [Academician A. E. Arbuzov (world vision, science, life)] (in Russian). Казань: Татарское книжное издательство. pp. 93–96.
- Valitova, F. G. (1985). "Воспоминания о Александре Арбузове". Академик А. Е. Арбузов (мировоззрение, наука, жизнь) [Academician A. E. Arbuzov (world vision, science, life)] (in Russian). Казань: Татарское книжное издательство. pp. 218–227.
- Visel, А. О. (2003). "Воспоминания об учителе". Б. А. Арбузов — учёный-педагог. Воспоминания учеников, коллег, сотрудников [B. A. Arbuzov - scientist-pedagogue. Memories of students, colleagues, employees] (in Russian). Казань: Издательство Казанского университета. pp. 42–57. ISBN 5-7464-0801-8
- Grechkin, N. P. (1985). "Воспоминания о Александре Арбузове". Академик А. Е. Арбузов (мировоззрение, наука, жизнь) [Academician A. E. Arbuzov (world vision, science, life)] (in Russian). Казань: Татарское книжное издательство. pp. 171–185.
- Zoroastrova, V. M. (1985). Воспоминания о Александре Арбузове [Memories of Alexander Arbuzov]. In A. S. Lozovoy (ed.). Академик А. Е. Арбузов (мировоззрение, наука, жизнь) [Academician A. E. Arbuzov (world vision, science, life)] (in Russian). Kazan: Татарское книжное издательство. pp. 213–218.
- Kozyryov, V. M. (1985). "Воспоминания о Александре Арбузове". Академик А. Е. Арбузов (мировоззрение, наука, жизнь) [Academician A. E. Arbuzov (world vision, science, life)] (in Russian). Казань: Татарское книжное издательство. pp. 119–127.
- Lapkin, I. I. (1985). "Воспоминания о Александре Арбузове". Академик А. Е. Арбузов (мировоззрение, наука, жизнь) [Academician A. E. Arbuzov (world vision, science, life)] (in Russian). Казань: Татарское книжное издательство. pp. 127–131.
- Lozovoy, A. S. (1985). "Воспоминания о Александре Арбузове". Академик А. Е. Арбузов (мировоззрение, наука, жизнь) [Academician A. E. Arbuzov (world vision, science, life)] (in Russian). Казань: Татарское книжное издательство. pp. 227–234.
- Maksimov, K. E. (1985). "Воспоминания о Александре Арбузове". Академик А. Е. Арбузов (мировоззрение, наука, жизнь) [Academician A. E. Arbuzov (world vision, science, life)] (in Russian). Казань: Татарское книжное издательство. pp. 205–207.
- Mukhamedova, L. A. (2003). "Воспоминания об академиках Арбузовых". Б. А. Арбузов — учёный-педагог. Воспоминания учеников, коллег, сотрудников [B. A. Arbuzov - scientist-pedagogue. Memories of students, colleagues, employees] (in Russian). Казань: Издательство Казанского университета. pp. 109–113. ISBN 5-7464-0801-8
- Polezhayeva, N. A. (2003). "Выдающийся учёный-химик-органик". Б. А. Арбузов — учёный-педагог. Воспоминания учеников, коллег, сотрудников [B. A. Arbuzov - scientist-pedagogue. Memories of students, colleagues, employees] (in Russian). Казань: Издательство Казанского университета. pp. 127–129. ISBN 5-7464-0801-8
- Polikarpov, S. I. (1985). "Воспоминания о Александре Арбузове". Академик А. Е. Арбузов (мировоззрение, наука, жизнь) [Academician A. E. Arbuzov (world vision, science, life)] (in Russian). Казань: Татарское книжное издательство. pp. 190–193.
- Khasanov, M. Kh. (2003). "Династия учёных Арбузовых как компонент Казанской химической школы". Б. А. Арбузов — учёный-педагог. Воспоминания учеников, коллег, сотрудников [B. A. Arbuzov - scientist-pedagogue. Memories of students, colleagues, employees] (in Russian). Казань: Издательство Казанского университета. pp. 69–74.
- Chzhan-Tsinlin (1989). "Учитель, перед именем твоим". Александр Ерминингельдович Арбузов: Очерки. Воспоминания. Материалы [Alexander Yerminingeldovich Arbuzov: Essays. Memories. Materials]. Учёные СССР. Очерки, воспоминания, материалы (in Russian). М.: Наука. pp. 137–139. ISBN 5-0200-1392-7
- Yuldasheva, L. K. (2003). "Учёный, гражданин, человек". Б. А. Арбузов — учёный-педагог. Воспоминания учеников, коллег, сотрудников [B. A. Arbuzov - scientist-pedagogue. Memories of students, colleagues, employees] (in Russian). Казань: Издательство Казанского университета. pp. 42–57.

=== Researches and non-fiction ===
- Arbuzov, V. A. (1967). Казанская школа [Kazan school] (in Russian). Химия и жизнь: Журнал. — Академия наук СССР. pp. 18–20. ISSN 0130-5972.
- Gaidukova N. M., Koreeva N. S. (2010). Дом-музей академиков Арбузовых в Казани // Музеи Российской академии наук: Альманах [House-Museum of Academicians Arbuzovs in Kazan // Museums of the Russian Academy of Sciences: Almanac] (in Russian). Таус. pp. 216–231. ISBN 978-5-9030-1170-4.
- Grechkin N. P., Kuznetsov V. I. (1977). А. Е. Арбузов [A. E. Arbuzov]. Научные биографии (in Russian). М.: Наука. p. 232.
- Grechkin, N. P. (1977). Александр Ерминингельдович Арбузов (1877—1968). Краткая биография [Alexander Erminindovich Arbuzov (1877-1968). Brief biography] (in Russian). Казань: Татарское книжное издательство. p. 25.
- Grechkin, N. P. (1967). "А. Е." К 90-летию академика Александра Ерминингельдовича Арбузова ["А. Е." To the 90th Anniversary of Academician Alexander Ermingeldovich Arbuzov] (in Russian). Химия и жизнь: Журнал. — Академия наук СССР, . — Август (№ 8). — С. . — ISSN 0130-5972. pp. 13–16.
- Kamay, G. Kh. (1952). Академик А. Е. Арбузов [Academician A. E. Arbuzov] (in Russian). Казань: Татгосиздат. Редакция научно-технической литературы. p. 31.
- Mirgazizov, R. M. (2001). Три страсти академика Арбузова [Academician Arbuzov's three passions] (in Russian). Республика Татарстан: Газета.
- Tumanskaya, O. (2020). Химия людских отношений: про частную жизнь академиков Арбузовых. Дом-музей академиков Арбузовы [Chemistry of Human Relations: The Private Life of Academician Arbuzovs House-Museum of the Academician Arbuzovs] (in Russian). Татарстан: Журнал.
- Frumov, R. (1947). Депутат народа академик А. Е. Арбузов [A. E. Arbuzov, People's Deputy and Academician] (in Russian). Казань: Татгосиздат. Сектор политической литературы. p. 31.

=== Handbooks and guidebooks ===
- Академик А. Е. Арбузов в Казани [Academician A. E. Arbuzov in Kazan] (in Russian). Казань: Тат. ОК КПСС. 1977. p. 7.
- Gaidukova, N. M. (2002). "Арбузовых А. Е. и Б. А. дом-музей". Татарская энциклопедия [The Tatar Encyclopedia] (in Russian). Vol. 1: А — В. Казань: Институт Татарской энциклопедии Академии наук Республики Татарстан. p. 176. ISBN 585247035X.
- Gaidukova N. M., Koreeva N. S. (2003). Дом-музей академиков А. Е. и Б. А. Арбузовых [House-museum of Academicians A. E. and B. A. Arbuzovs]. Казанские музеи (in Russian). Казань: Издательство Казанского университета. p. 24. ISBN 5-7464-0788-7.
- Gaidukova N. M., Koreeva N. S. (2002). Дом-музей академиков Арбузовых [House-museum of Academicians Arbuzovs]. Казанские музеи (in Russian). Казань: Kazan-Казань. p. 16.
- "Дом, в котором жили академики А. Е. и Б. А. Арбузовы, и композитор Ф. Яруллин". Казань в памятниках истории и культуры [Kazan in historical and cultural monuments] (in Russian). Казань: Татарское книжное издательство. 1982. pp. 55–56.
- "Казань. Катановский 8". Объекты культурного наследия Республики Татарстан [Objects of cultural heritage of the Republic of Tatarstan] (in Russian). Vol. 1. Казань. Казань: Министерство культуры Республики Татарстан, НИИЦентр. 2020. p. 502. ISBN 978-5-9021-5643-7.
