= Alexander Butlerov Chemistry Institute =

Research lab at Kazan Federal University

Coordinates: 55.7928°N 49.1199°E

Alexander Butlerov Chemistry Institute (former name Chemical Faculty of Kazan State University)
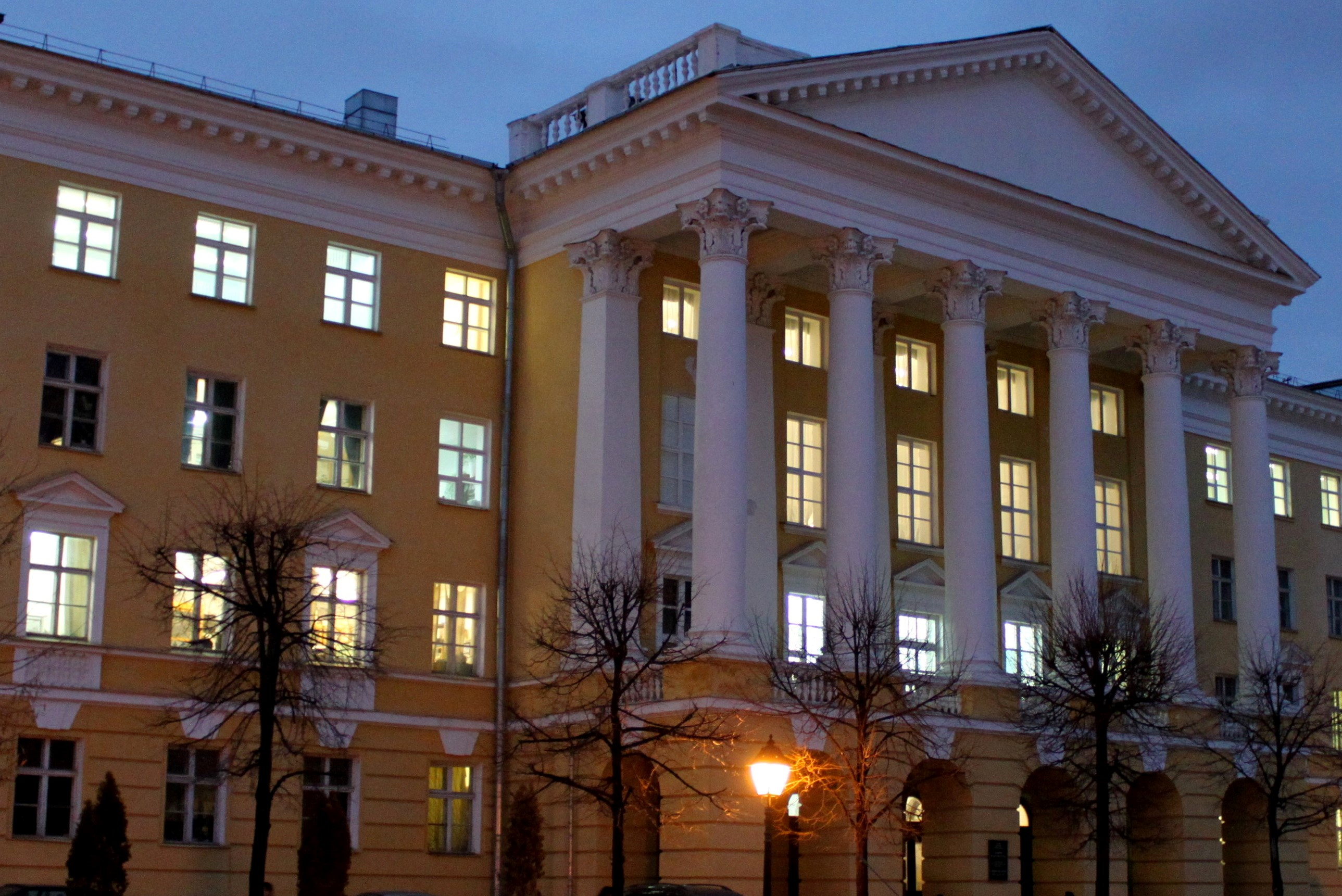
- Established: 1933 (Chemical Faculty), 2003 (Alexander Butlerov Chemistry Institute)
- Director: Vladimir I. Galkin
- Location: Kazan, [Russia
- Website: http://www.kpfu.ru/chemistry/

Alexander Butlerov Chemistry Institute (former name Chemical Faculty of Kazan State University) — structural unit of Kazan (Volga region) Federal University, carries out research, development and academic activity in the area of basic and applied chemistry.

== History ==
The experience in chemistry research in Kazan University dates back to its foundation: the first chemical laboratories were opened at the departments of «Chemistry and metallurgy» and «Technology and science related to trade and factories» nearly after the University foundation. Scientific works of chemists – Karl K. Klaus, Nikolay N. Zinin, Alexander M. Butlerov, Vladimir V. Markovnikov, Alexander M. Zaitsev, Eugeny E. Wagner, Alexander E. Arbuzov, Boris A. Arbuzov, Arcady N. Pudovik, Vladimir S. Abramov. – laid the foundation of Kazan School of Chemistry. In 1933 as a result of reorganization of Soviet Universities, Faculty of Chemistry in Kazan University was opened. On April 21, 2003 according to the decision of the Academic Council of Kazan State University the Chemistry Institute named after Butlerov was established by merging of Research Institute named after A.M. Butlerov and Chemical Faculty of Kazan University. Scientists worked at the Chemical Institute, left a deep trace in the history of science. Butlerov formulated the Theory of chemical structure in 1858. 1841 is famous for development of methods for industrial production of synthetic aniline by Zinin. In 1844 Klaus discovered and studied chemical element ruthenium – the single element that was discovered in Russia. Markovnikov has discovered the rule of regioselective addition of acid and water to multiple bonds, on the contrary – Zaitsev – the cleavage of the molecules of acids and water with the formation of unsaturated compounds. Arbuzov, Arbuzov, Pudovik, and Abramov are also widely known in organic and organoelement chemistry.

=== Deans ===
Feoktist I. Bogoyavlenskiy (1933–1935)
Vasiliy V. Evlampiev (1935–1939)
Faizi F. Faizyllin (1958–1960)
Boris A. Arbuzov (1941–1950)
Arkadiy N. Pudovik (1950–1958)
Faizi F. Faizyllin (1958–1960)
Vera F. Toropova (1960–1965)
Alexander I. Kostromin (1965–1968)
Alexander I. Konovalov (1968–1972)
Irina V. Konovalova (1972–1987)
Galina A. Chmutova (1987–1992)
Nikolai A. Ulakhovich (1992–2000)
Vladimir I. Galkin (since 2000– until present)

== Structure of the institute ==
=== Departments ===
Department of Analytical Chemistry
Department of High Molecular and Organoelement Compounds
Department of Inorganic Chemistry
Department of Organic Chemistry
Department of Physical Chemistry
Department of Chemical Education
Department of Environmental Chemistry
Department of Applied Chemistry Department of Stereochemistry

=== Divisions ===
Division for Analytical Chemistry
Division for Inorganic Chemistry and Coordination chemistry
Division for Organic Chemistry
Division for Physical Chemistry
Division for Organoelement Compounds
Division for Stereochemistry
Division for Applied Chemistry
Division for Environmental Chemistry

== Areas of research activity ==
=== Department of Analytical Chemistry ===
Division of analytical chemistry and laboratory of bio-electrochemical biosensor research function in this department. The division conducts research in the area of methods of electrochemical analysis using chemically modified electrodes and biosensors. The head of the department is Professor Gennady A. Evtyugin, doctor of Science in chemistry.
The Department conducts research in the following fields:

- development of chemically modified electrodes for determining oxidation of organic compounds;
- design of enzyme and DNA sensors for determination of biologically significant compounds – toxins, metabolites, pesticides;
- immunochemical analysis;
- employing of the new methods of coulometric and voltammetric determination of antioxidant – vitamins, food additives, drugs and group estimation of food products and other complex objects on the content of these compounds;
- potentiometric sensors based on macrocyclic receptors for group and individual determination of inorganic and organic ions;
- determining of DNA damage and creation of hybrid materials by inclusion of DNA and metal nanoparticles;
- synthesis and characteristics of various organophosphorus compounds – phosphine oxides, amino phosphonates, phosphabetains which are applied in the purification of membrane technologies and selective concentration of metal ions, as well as a part of ion-selective electrodes.

The department maintains contact with many academic institutes and leading universities in Russia and abroad: Moscow State University, Kazan National Research University, Comenius University (Slovakia), University of Rome Tor Vergata (Italy). Postgraduate students and young staff of the department regularly participate in traineeship and international and domestic research projects provided by the RFBR, Russian Ministry of Education and Science and academic exchange programs. Staff of the department are actively participate in preparation and releasing of collective monographs "Problems of Analytical Chemistry" (published by "Science") series, reflecting their own experience in solving analytical problems in related fields, such as medicine and pharmacy.

=== Department of High Molecular and Organoelement Compounds ===
Subject of research: synthesis of organophosphorous and organoelement compounds, study of their spatial and electronic structure, intramolecular electronic interactions, reaction capacity and mechanism of reactions. Arkady N. Pudovik corresponding member of Russian Academy of Science worked at this department since its opening (1948) until his death (February 2006) he was the founder of the department of High Molecular and Organoelement Compounds and held the position of Head of department until 1987. Current head of the Department – Corresponding Member of the Academy of Sciences of the Republic of Tatarstan, Professor Vladimir I. Galkin, doctor of Science in chemistry.
The Department conducts research in the following fields:

- theoretical and experimental study of relationship of structure and reaction capacity of phosphorus compounds of different coordination and other derivatives of intransitive elements; development of effective methods for synthesis of new substances;
- receive and study of a new generation of bioactive, complexable, extraction, ionophoric, membrane transport and other practically useful substances on the basis of polyfunctional compounds of phosphorus;
- directed synthesis of physiologically active substances for human and veterinary medicine based on biomimetic approach;
- study of stereoselective processes involving organic, organoelement and coordination compounds;
- use of metal complex compounds for chemo- and regioselective catalytic and stoichiometric functionalization of organic compounds that do not exhibit reactivity and / or selectivity hydrophosphoryl compounds in conditions of classical synthesis of organophosphorus compounds.

=== Department of Inorganic Chemistry ===
Department trains specialist in the areas of inorganic and coordination chemistry, provides courses on disciplines “General chemistry” and “Inorganic chemistry” for chemical, biological, geographical, geological, environmental and physical faculties. Within specialization “Inorganic chemistry” lectures on chemistry of complex compounds, synthesis of inorganic compounds, theory of solutions, optical and electrochemical methods of research of balance in solutions magnetochemistry and radio frequency spectroscopy of coordination compounds, balance in heterogeneous inorganic systems, theory of symmetry in coordination chemistry, supramolecular inorganic chemistry and inorganic chemistry clusters. In addition to the general course of inorganic chemistry, chemists of the faculty have courses in metrology, basics of bioinorganic chemistry, anthropogenic systems and environmental risks, environmental chemistry, computers in chemical calculations and many others. Head of the Department – Professor Rustem R. Amirov, doctor of Science in chemistry.
The department develops research work. The main aim of research implemented – development of new approaches to study of composition, stability structure of coordination metal compounds in various condensed mediums, kinetics and mechanisms of fast reactions of substitution and synthesis of compounds with desired properties. Thermodynamics of formation reactions and structure of coordination metal compounds with various organic ligands, including bioactive ligands has been studied. Regularities of solvation reactions ligand, proton and electron exchange in solutions of coordination compounds were set. On the grounds of basic studies a number of compounds with high anti-tumor activity were synthesized.
The Department conducts research in the following fields:

- study of complex formation in supramolecular systems – organized ensembles surfactants and macrocyclic ligands;
- study of coordination compounds of iron (III) and manganese (II) for magnetic resonance imaging;
- obtaining new types of hybrid organic-inorganic functional materials based on nanoscale hyperbranched structures.

Results of these studies are of basic value in the area of coordination chemistry, bioinorganic chemistry, chemistry of nanomaterials, pharmaceutical chemistry. Proposed model and physio-chemical basis of self-assembly of nanoscale of hyperbranched polymers, set new approaches to understanding the mechanisms of gene transfection and targeted drug delivery.

=== Department of Organic Chemistry ===
The Department works at the intersection of organic chemistry (chemistry of natural products, chemistry of macrocyclic compounds, chemistry of elementorganic compounds), supramolecular chemistry (solution and self-process chemistry) and molecular biology. The head of the Department is Professor Igor S. Antipin, a corresponding member of the Russian Academy of Science, Doctor of Chemistry. The Department conducts research in the following fields:

- creating non-viral transfection agents, developing preparations for biotechnological production and gene therapy;
- creating new programmable materials based on hybrid nanoparticles for medicine and biochemistry;
- developing direct synthesis methods, studying structure and properties of new sulphur derivatives of five-membered oxygen- and nitrogen-containing heterocycles;
- searching for chemo-, region- and stereo-selective thiating and aminating reactions with the view to create new antimicrobial agents based on studied heterocycles;
- developing new principles of pathogenic microflora control in collaboration with biologists. New organic synthesis methods are developed here, as well.

=== Department of Physical Chemistry ===
At the present time the Department promotes various scientific fields, running the whole gamut of base branches of classical physical chemistry: thermodynamics, kinetics, electrochemistry, catalysis, sorption processes. As the subjects of research, organic compounds unite all the aforesaid research areas. Over the last years staff members of the Department of Physical Chemistry made reports at conferences in many countries of the world: Canada, Poland, Republic of South Africa, Italy, Germany, Portugal, Czech Republic, USA, Ireland, Croatia, Spain, Sweden, Japan, Brazil. The head of the Department is Professor Boris N. Solomonov, Doctor of Science in Chemistry.
The Department conducts research in the following fields:

- physical chemistry of supramolecular systems studying intermolecular interactions between gaseous matters and solid sorbents;
- thermodynamics of the processes forming clathrates of supramolecular receptors and organic compounds;
- studying thermal stability of supramolecular receptors and inclusion compounds formed of them; studying receptor properties of nanoscale layers of supramolecular receptors;
- developing new methods for studying pressure effect on reactivity and thermodynamics of organic reactions;
- designing new commercial catalysts for petrochemical synthesis with the help of nanotechnologies among others;
- studying physical and chemical principles of protein functioning in non-aqueous media;
- studying spatial and electronic structure of organic and organoelement compounds;
- developing new methods of electrochemical synthesis of organic compounds;
- fundamental challenges in: intermolecular interactions in organic nonelectrolyte solutions, thermodynamic phase transitions.

=== Department of Chemical Education ===
The Department was founded in 1934 in Kazan Teachers’ Institute to educate future teachers of chemistry. In November, 2011 the Department of Chemical Education became a structural unit of A. M. Butlerov Institute of Chemistry of Kazan (Volga Region) Federal University. Educational research was combined with fundamental and applied research in chemistry.
International, All-Russian and regional research-to-practice conferences on chemical education organized by the Department are of the utmost interest. The Department has received letters of gratitude from school principals for instructing students in research and methodology in their preparation for teaching practice. Today 3 Doctors of Science and 5 Doctors of Philosophy are involved in the educational and bringing-up process at the Department. Since 2010 teachers have been retrained in the field of “Teacher of Chemistry”.The head of the Department is Suria I. Gilmanshina, Doctor of Philosophy in Chemistry, Doctor of Science in Education.
The Department conducts research in the following fields:

- thio-phosphorylated derivatives of resorcinols and calixarenes;
- studying thio-phosphorylated unsaturated compounds using petrochemical and wood-chemical feedstock;
- generation and theoretical study of phosphabetains and their derivatives (phosphonium salts, carboxyl-containing metal complexes);
- searching for liquid growth-boosting fertilizer compounds based on microelements.

== Teaching process ==
The following majors are currently offered to students:

- 04.03.01 Chemistry, Bachelor's degree program;
- 04.05.01 Fundamental and Applied Chemistry, Specialist Degree program;
- 04.04.01 Chemistry, Master's degree program;
- 44.03.01 Pedagogical Education, Bachelor's degree program.

The following master's degree programs are offered by the Institute in the academic year 2015–2016:

- “Chemoinformatics and Molecular Simulation”;
- “Chemistry of Supramolecular Nano- and Biosystems”;
- “Methods of Analytical Chemistry”;
- “Physical-Chemical Methods in Chemistry”;
- “Petrochemistry and Catalysis”.

Total number of students taking Bachelor, Specialist and master's degree programs is 472 (as of January, 2016).Departments of the Institute of Chemistry educate postgraduates in the following majors:

- 02.00.01 – Inorganic Chemistry;
- 02.00.02 – Analytical Chemistry;
- 02.00.03 – Organic Chemistry;
- 02.00.04 – Physical Chemistry;
- 02.00.08 – Chemistry of Organoelement Compounds.

There are two dissertation councils functioning in the Institute of Chemistry for thesis defence in chemical sciences:

- Д 212.081.03 under the Federal State Autonomous Institution of Higher Education “Kazan (Volga Region) Federal University”; majors allowed for defence:
  - 02.00.01 – Inorganic Chemistry;
  - 02.00.08 – Chemistry of Organoelement Compounds;

Chairman of the Council is Professor Vladimir I. Galkin, Doctor of Chemistry;

- Д 212.081.30 under the Federal State Autonomous Institution of Higher Education “Kazan (Volga Region) Federal University”; majors allowed for defence:
  - 02.00.02 – Analytical Chemistry;
  - 02.00.03 – Organic Chemistry;

Chairman of the Council is Professor Igor S. Antipin, Doctor of Chemistry.

== Institute infrastructure ==
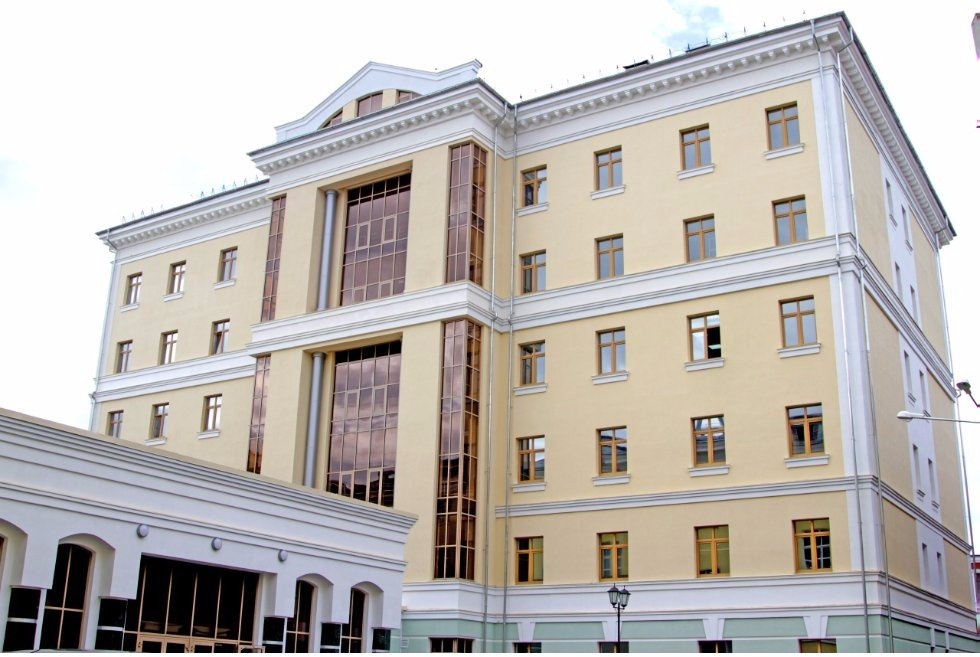
A new campus of Alexander Butlerov Institute of Chemistry

The main building of the Institute is located at the intersection of Kremlyovskaya and Lobachevskaya streets. This four-story building built in 1953 in the style of Soviet neoclassicism under the guidance of architect A.G. Bikchentaev. The building of the museum of Kazan chemical school is located in the campus of the main university building, built in the 1830s in a classical style under the guidance of architect M.P. Corinfskiy.
In 2015 construction of a large laboratory building in the campus of Alexander Butlerov Institute of Chemistry was finished. The 7-storey building housed classrooms and laboratories of departments of Alexander Butlerov Institute of Chemistry, Institute of Geology and Petroleum Technologies, Institute of Physics. The building was constructed with the support of the President of Tatarstan R.N. Minnikhanov and PSC "TAIF".

== Museum of Kazan School of Chemistry ==
The museum is located in a small two-storey building where laboratory of physics (on the first floor) and chemical laboratory (on the second floor) was designed. It was the first chemical laboratory of Kazan University. The first professor was N.N. Zinin, who studied abroad and learned new method of teaching chemistry and began to apply it in Kazan University. This method combined practical and lecture classes that is still familiar to students. There are no usual stalls and stands in the museum. It is a memorial laboratory of the 19th century which includes Butlerov's lecture room, a library, the laboratory itself, a hall for exhibiting chemical preparations and laboratory equipment of 19–20th centuries, and the study of the head of the laboratory (Butlerov's study). Nowadays in the main hall of the museum lectures and seminars and defence of master's and doctoral theses are conducted. In the side rooms you may observe modern laboratories.

== Interesting facts ==
- Alexander Butlerov Institute of Chemistry trains students for school chemical Olympiads of the Republic of Tatarstan and the Russian Federation. At various times, professors of the Institute of Chemistry headed Russian teams at International School Chemistry Olympiad among them were Andrey N. Vedernikov, Arkady I. Kuramshin and Igor A. Sedov;
- The old building of the Alexander Butlerov Institute of Chemistry since it was built in 1953, was not only a laboratory building of chemical faculty of Kazan University, at different times, it also placed historical-philological faculty of Kazan University, military department, some rooms were used as a hostel for young teachers and graduate students of the University.
