= Boris Arbuzov (chemist) =

Soviet chemist and politician

Boris Aleksandrovich Arbuzov (4 November 1903 – 6 November 1991), was a Russian and Soviet chemist and a representative of the Supreme Soviet of the Soviet Union of 7th, 8th, 9th, 10th and 11th convocations.

== Early life and career ==
Boris Arbuzov was born on November 4, 1903, in a family of scientists. His father was Aleksandr Arbuzov, a chemist and founder of the chemistry of organophosphorus compounds. In 1926, Boris Arbuzov had graduated from the Kazan Institute of Agriculture and Forestry.

From 1929 to 1935 he worked at the Kazan Veterinary Institute, a part of the Kazan National Research Technological University where he organized and headed the department of synthetic rubber. From 1932 to 1938 he worked at the Kazan Federal University. From 1940 to 1950 he was a dean of the chemical faculty at the Alexander Butlerov Chemistry Institute and until 1967 headed the department of organic chemistry. From 1960 to 1989 he was the head and director of the Kazan Institute of Organic Chemistry, the Academy of Sciences of the Soviet Union, and later - the Aleksandr Arbuzov Institute of Organic and Physical Chemistry. In 1938 he was arrested, but was freed in February 1939, due to lack of evidence.

== Research ==
At the beginning of scientific activity he studied (under the guidance of AE Arbuzov) the method of tapping coniferous trees, the composition of the gum and the products of its processing - turpentine and rosin. The work was of great practical importance, and allowed a new approach to the issue of the technical use of turpentine for which he was awarded the A. Butlerov Prize from the Russian Physico-Chemical Society in 1928. A year later, together with AE Arbuzov, he discovered the reaction of formation of free radicals of the triarylmethyl series which is formed from aryl bromomethane. He conducted research in a series of derivatives of pyrolytic phosphorus, resulted in the preparation of the drug pyrophos and octamethyl pesticide. After 1930, he studied the chemical transformations of terpenes and the mechanism of their oxides transformation.

== Honours ==
- 1944/1945 – Order of the Red Banner of Labour
- 1951 – Stalin Prize
- 1953/1963/1969/1973/1984 – Order of Lenin
- 1969 – Hero of Socialist Labour
- 1975 – Order of the October Revolution
- 1978 – Lenin Prize
- 1979 – Order of Friendship of Peoples

== See also ==
- Aleksandr and Boris Arbuzov House-Museum
