= Yegor Wagner =

Russian chemist (1849–1903)

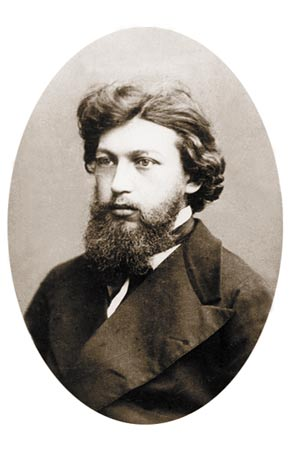
- Born: Yegor Yegorovich Wagner; 9 December 1849; Kazan, Russian Empire
- Died: 27 November 1903 (aged 53); Warsaw, Russian Empire
- Education: University of Kazan
- Known for: Wagner reaction Wagner-Meerwein rearrangement
- Spouses: Vera Alexandrovna Barkhatova (m. 1874): Alexandra Afanasyevna Afanasyeva
- Scientific career
- Fields: Chemistry
- Workplaces: University of Warsaw
- Doctoral advisors: A.M. Zaitsev; A.M. Butlerov; Menshutkin N. A.

Yegor Yegorovich Wagner (sometimes Georg Wagner or Egor Vagner; Russian: Егор Егорович Вагнер; 9 December 1849 – 27 November 1903) was a Russian organic chemist, famous for the discovery of the "Wagner reaction", named after him. Former representative of the Kazan School of Chemistry.

== Early life ==
Yegor Yegorovich Wagner's grandfather was August Wagner, a pharmacist from East Prussia. In search of happiness, young August went to distant Russia, to the city of Kazan, where he opened his own pharmacy. His affairs were going well, which was largely facilitated by high qualifications and personal charm. After several years of work, August became a wealthy man and married a local girl from a German family. The marriage was happy, but short-lived - August Wagner died suddenly, leaving his wife Yegor's son and daughter Maria.

The widow married the pharmacist Bachmann. He warmly treated to orphaned children and replaced their own father. When little Yegor Avgustovich grew up, he was sent to a gymnasium. He studied diligently and pleased his relatives with his successes. The young man received his higher education at University of Kazan, choosing legal sciences as his specialty.

Yegor Avgustovich Wagner was in the government service for the majority of his life - he first worked in the specific department before moving to the excise department. He had to constantly travel around the country on official business, and only began to lead a settled way of life when he was offered a permanent job in Kazan.

Shortly after graduating from the university, Yegor Avgustovich married Alexandra Mikhailovna Lvova, the daughter of the director of the Kazan Gymnasium. Alexandra Mikhailovna was distinguished by special warmth, was fond of music and theatrical art. Possessing a pleasant voice, she sang at family celebrations and participated in home performances.

On December 9, 1849, a son was born into the young Wagner family - the future scientist, named after his father Yegor. Less than a year after the birth of the boy, his mother died from tuberculosis. Since the father of little Yegor was away because of work all the time, his grandfather and grandmother took care of the boy. They loved their grandson with all their heart, although the lively, cheerful little boy gave them a lot of trouble. Yegor inherited artistic inclinations from his mother - he loved to read the poems of famous poets expressively, especially Pushkin and Lermontov.

Meanwhile, Yegor Avgustovich returned to Kazan for permanent residence and married a second time. He wanted to take his son to him, but he refused, because he was little acquainted with his father and wanted to stay with those who raised him. Yegor Avgustovich understood how painful it would be for the boy to get apart with his grandparents, and agreed that his son would continue to live in the Bakhman family.

When the old pharmacist Bachman died, Yegor was sent to a private boarding house, located near the city of Venden in the Livonian province (the territory of present-day Latvia). The boarding school was a closed educational institution with a strictly regulated regime and strict discipline. For Yegor Wagner, accustomed to unlimited freedom and complete independence, the transition to life in the new conditions was quite painful, and at first conflicts often occurred. The boy studied very diligently, the teachers spoke flatteringly about his abilities and constantly noted him as one of the best students of the boarding school. However, he was never able to fully get used to the strict routines of the boarding school, and in the winter of 1865, a year before the end of the course, sixteen-year-old Yegor Wagner fled from the boarding house to his father's house. There was barely enough money to get to Nizhny Novgorod, and Yegor had to walk the rest of the way to Kazan along with the convoy, which moved along the Volga. Yegor Avgustovich met his son without a word of reproach and only joked: "Well, brother, you are a perfect Lomonosov, just the opposite: he fled with a convoy to study, and you ran away from study."

== University of Kazan ==
Returning home, Yegor began to intensively prepare for admission to University of Kazan, and two years later, in June 1867, he passed the entrance examinations to the Faculty of Law. His father had a great influence on the choice of his future specialty, but Yegor himself was interested in jurisprudence. In the 60s, a reform of the judiciary was carried out in Russia, and therefore a career as a lawyer seemed to him very attractive.

As a student, Wagner devoted all his free time to the theater. He played in all the student productions and did not miss a single premiere on the big stage. His performances exemplified his talent in acting, and Wagner gained great fame among theater admirers.

In the third year of study, Yegor Vagner lost interest in legal sciences and applied for a transfer to the first year of the category of natural sciences at the Faculty of Physics and Mathematics. Of all the natural sciences, he was most attracted to chemistry. Lectures on chemistry were delivered by professor A.M. Zaitsev, who was a student of A.M. Butlerov. It was under his influence that Yegor Wagner finally decided to devote himself to chemistry, which, in his own words, “led him to extraordinary delight” and “shocked him to the core.” At that time, the works of A.M. Zaitsev were devoted to the experimental substantiation of the most important provisions of the theory of the chemical structure of A.M. Butlerov. One of the directions of research was the synthesis of isomeric alcohols, which were predicted by the theory of chemical structure. It was to these works that the student Wagner was attracted.

Combining academic studies and productive work in the field of organic synthesis under the guidance of A.M. Zaitsev, Wagner completed his studies in May 1874, having successfully passed the state exams. According to the results of the exams, he was recommended by the leadership of the faculty to obtain a Ph.D. after submitting a dissertation. The dissertation on the topic "Synthesis of diethylcarbinol, a new isomer of amyl alcohol" was defended by Wagner in the autumn of 1874 and received a positive assessment from the reviewers. Having received the degree of candidate of natural sciences, in the same autumn, twenty-five-year-old Yegor Yegorovich, on the proposal of A.M. Zaitsev was offered to work at University of Kazan to prepare for a professorship.

At the end of 1874, a large article by E.E. Wagner and A.M. Zaitsev about a new synthetic method for obtaining secondary alcohols using the example of diethylcarbinol, which consisted in the action of ethyl iodide and metallic zinc on the ethyl ester of formic acid. This discovery received a proper assessment of the chemical community and went down in history as the Wagner-Zaitsev reaction.

== Petersburg University ==
In August 1875, on the recommendation of Zaitsev, Wagner was sent to St. Petersburg University to continue work on the synthesis of secondary alcohols in the laboratory of A.M. Butlerov. In addition, the young scientist repeatedly spoke at meetings of the Russian Chemical Society, where the most important representatives of domestic chemistry gathered. Messages about his work aroused constant interest, due to the novelty of ideas, and important results, and the outstanding oratorical abilities of Wagner himself. Therefore, when the assignment came to an end and Egor Wagner had to return to Kazan, Professor N.A. Menshutkin, who at that time was one of the leading chemists at St. Petersburg University, offered him a position as a laboratory assistant in his laboratory of analytical chemistry. Thus began the pedagogical activity of Yegor Yegorovich Wagner, which continued with constant success for 25 years - until his death in 1903.

Egor Egorovich dreamed of developing a general method for obtaining secondary alcohols by the action of various zinc alkyls on aldehydes of different homologous series. In the course of these studies, a series of chemical activity of aldehydes was compiled (based on the rate of their interaction with zincethyl). The results of Wagner's work at St. Petersburg University formed the first section of his master's dissertation. In addition, it was in St. Petersburg, in the laboratories of Butlerov and Menshutkin, that his formation as a scientist and teacher took place.

== Novo-Alexandria Institute of Agriculture and Forestry ==
In 1881, Yegor Yegorovich Wagner left St. Petersburg University and went to Novoaleksandria (Lublin province) to take the position of assistant professor at the Department of Forestry and Agricultural Technology at the Novo-Aleksandria Institute of Agriculture and Forestry. Despite the low level of teaching and the rather tense atmosphere at the university, Yegor Yegorovich did not lose his spirit, even if he had to lecture in an almost empty auditorium. He managed to earn the respect of both students and fellow teachers, and to a large extent contributed to the improvement of educational and methodological work. At the New Alexandria Institute, what Wagner so strongly aspired to was realized. For the first time he had his own scientific laboratory, for the first time he had his own students, who carried out the research he had conceived under his leadership.

Having completed the development of a general method for the synthesis of secondary alcohols, Wagner set himself the task of studying the laws of ketone oxidation. In particular, he specified the rule for the oxidation of ketones proposed by A.N. Popov in 1868-1872: “The oxidation of unsymmetrical acyclic ketones is carried out with the breaking of the carbon chain on both sides of the carbonyl group, which generally leads to the formation of a mixture of four acids.”

Experimentally, Wagner proved that the reaction products mainly depend on the size of the radicals, their structure, as well as on the nature of the oxidizing agent and temperature.

By December 1884, the work was completed, and Wagner defended his master's thesis on the topic "Synthesis of secondary alcohols and their oxidation." It consisted of two parts, the first included developments made in St. Petersburg, and the second considered in detail the research conducted at the Novo-Alexandria Institute. Both parts in the form of articles were published in the "Journal of the Russian Physical and Chemical Society" and deserved high praise from the members of the society. A month after the defense, Egor Egorovich Wagner was approved as a professor at the Novo-Alexandria Institute at the Department of General and Analytical Chemistry.

== University of Warsaw ==
In 1886, a vacancy at the Department of Technical Chemistry became vacant at the University of Warsaw, and, following the advice of friends, Wagner filed a petition to transfer him to Warsaw. As a result, he was appointed professor in the Department of General Chemistry at the Faculty of Physics and Mathematics at the University of Warsaw and had to teach two courses of lectures - on organic and technical chemistry, which he did brilliantly. In addition, Wagner is fully credited for organizing practical classes in chemistry at the university. He equipped several laboratories from scratch for classes with students by himself.

== Wagner reaction (Wagner oxidation) ==
Immediately after starting work at the university, Egor Egorovich began scientific research, choosing as his task the study of the oxidation of unsaturated organic compounds of various classes in order to determine their structure. He carried out the oxidation using his own method - using a weak solution of potassium permanganate in an alkaline medium. In the literature, this method is called "Wagner reaction", "Wagner oxidation" or "permanganate test".

The sample is considered positive if the permanganate solution quickly becomes colorless in an acidic environment or turns brown in an alkaline and neutral one. The permanganate test is a reliable evidence of the presence of multiple bonds in a chemical compound.

In the autumn of 1888, Yegor Egorovich Wagner's monograph "On the Oxidation of Unsaturated Carbon Compounds" was published, which was his doctoral dissertation, and on November 28, the Council of St. Petersburg University approved E. E. Wagner in the degree of Doctor of Chemistry.

In Warsaw, Wagner was actively engaged in the popularization of science: through his efforts, the Society of Naturalists was opened at University of Warsaw, in addition, he often went on business trips and to scientific congresses, attracting new trainees to scientific work. It is noteworthy that among the employees of his laboratory there were two women - S. Bushmakina and M. Idzkovskaya. This was the first time women were allowed to work in a chemical laboratory at the University of Warsaw. Yegor Yegorovich selected students on the basis of one single sign - a penchant for scientific research and the ability to work selflessly. Gradually, a team of genuine enthusiasts rallied around him, inspired by the creative ideas of their teacher.

== Wagner-Meerwein rearrangement ==
In the 1890s, research on terpenes began on a broad front in the laboratories of Warsaw University in order to shed light on their complex structure.

Essential oils and camphor have been known to people since ancient times. In the first half of the 19th century, numerous isomeric hydrocarbons with the general formula C_{10}H_{16}, called terpenes, were isolated from essential oils. Many well-known chemists of that time tried to establish the structure of these compounds, but the task was not easy due to the tendency of terpenes to rearrange, reciprocate and polymerize.

Applying their own method of oxidation with a solution of potassium permanganate to the compounds of this series, Wagner and his students proved the presence of multiple bonds in these compounds. Sequentially oxidizing terpenes to end products - various cyclic acids, they managed to determine the structural formulas of the following terpenes: monocyclic: pinol, sobrerol, α-terpineol, terpine, limonene, carvone; bicyclic: pinene, carone, camphene, bornylene and their derivatives.

The camphene rearrangement of the first kind (the Wagner-Meerwein rearrangement) discovered by Wagner in 1899 deserves special attention.

Wagner made presentations on the study of terpenes at various conferences: in 1897 in Braunschweig at the 69th Congress of German Naturalists and Physicians; in 1898 in Kyiv at the X Congress of Russian natural scientists and doctors, where he was elected chairman of the chemistry section and discussed with professors V.N. Ipatiev, I.A. Kablukov and N.D. Zelinsky.

Many of Wagner's students defended their Ph.D. dissertations, and his authority at Warsaw University was further strengthened when, in 1899, the Russian Physico-Chemical Society awarded him the highest award, which had not yet been awarded to anyone, - the big prize named after A.M. Butlerov "for the outstanding scientific value of the work and productive pedagogical activity."

In 1899, Wagner was offered the position of dean of the Faculty of Chemistry at the Warsaw Polytechnic Institute. Yegor Yegorovich successfully conducted organizational affairs and taught at two educational institutions at once.

== Private life ==
In 1874, while still a student at University of Kazan, Yegor Yegorovich met Vera Alexandrovna Barkhatova, the daughter of a Kazan public figure. Vera Aleksandrovna received an excellent education, she was passionate about theater, painting, knew Russian literature brilliantly and read the works of European classics in the originals. She was a cheerful, cordial, benevolent girl, and meeting with her became for the young Wagner the same need as scientific work. They soon got married.

Vera Alexandrovna went to St. Petersburg with her husband. The couple got acquainted with the sights of the capital and regularly visited art exhibitions. In St. Petersburg, the Wagners had two sons who brought new joys and new worries to family life. Yegor Yegorovich was an excellent family man. His wife and children played a big role in his life. He was interested in every little thing in the life of his children, and if one of the guys fell ill, Yegor Yegorovich simply could not find a place for himself from anxiety.

Five years of Petersburg life passed, and in 1880 a terrible blow fell on Yegor Yegorovich - Vera Alexandrovna died of consumption. Having lost his beloved wife and faithful friend, Wagner was close to suicide; only the moral support of his aunt Maria Avgustovna, his father's sister, who hastily arrived in St. Petersburg, saved him. After the death of his wife, Yegor Yegorovich devoted all his free time to work.

In Warsaw, Yegor Yegorovich Wagner remarried Alexandra Afanasyevna Afanasyeva. From this marriage two children were born - a son and a daughter. Maria Avgustovna was a member of the Wagner family all this time, who returned to Kazan only in extreme old age. Together with her, two sons of Yegor Yegorovich from their first marriage left Warsaw, following the example of their father, they entered University of Kazan and specialized in chemistry with A.M. Zaitsev. Later, one of them, E.E. Wagner, Jr., continued his scientific research in his father's laboratory in Warsaw.

== Later life ==
In the autumn of 1903, E.E. Wagner began to deteriorate sharply. He was plagued by severe stomach pains and general weakness. After a medical examination, the patient was diagnosed with a cancerous tumor requiring immediate surgical intervention. On November 12, Wagner was operated on, but the tumor turned out to be so large that it was not possible to remove it. By the middle of the next day, the patient began to weaken, and on November 14, 1903, Yegor Yegorovich Wagner died. He died in the arms of his family, remaining fully conscious until his death.

== Sources ==
- https://web.archive.org/web/20160304234114/http://www.chem.qmul.ac.uk/rschg/biog.html
- Lewis, David E. (2013). Yegor Yegorovich Vagner (1849−1903): A "Wondrously Sharpwitted" Chemist. ACS Symposium Series. Vol. 1136. pp. 143–165. doi:10.1021/bk-2013-1136.ch009. ISBN 978-0-8412-2800-9. ISSN 0097-6156.
- Sementsov, A. (1966). "Egor Egorovich Vagner and His Role in Terpene Chemistry". Chymia. 11: 151–155. doi:10.2307/27757265. ISSN 0095-9367. JSTOR 27757265.
- "Georg Wagner". Berichte der Deutschen Chemischen Gesellschaft. 36 (4): 4591–4613. 1903. doi:10.1002/cber.190303604139. ISSN 0365-9496.
