= Aleksandr Popov (chemist) =

Russian organic chemist

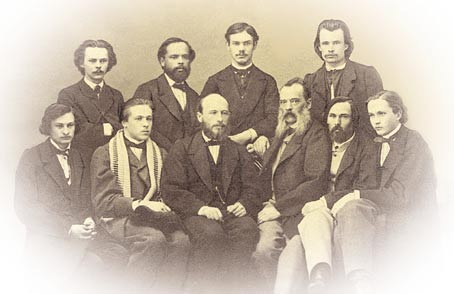
Popov (Standing second from left) with Butlerov (seated at centre), c. 1867

Alexander Nikiforovich Popov (Russian: Александр Никифорович Попов 1840 – 18 August 1881) was a Russian organic chemist. He taught chemistry at the University of Kazan and at the University of Warsaw. He discovered what is now called Popov's Rule (or Popoff's Rule) which states that in the oxidation of an unsymmetrical ketone, the cleavage of the C−CO bond so that the smaller alkyl group is retained.

Popov was born in Vitebsk where his father was a military officer. He studied at Kazan University and attended the chemistry lectures of A.M. Butlerov. After graduating in 1865, he worked as a chemical lab assistant. In 1868, he received a master's degree and became a professor at the University of Warsaw. In 1871, he went to work in Bonn with August Kekulé and E.K. Theodor Zinkce. During this period, he established the so-called Popov's Rule on the oxidation of benzene homologues being directed to the carbon atom bonded directly to the ring. He received a doctorate in 1872 for work on ketone oxidation. He identified an ordering of stability of radicals based on his examination of oxidation of asymmetric ketones which has been called Popov's rule. He served in the Russo-Turkish War (1877-1878). He introduced the use of potassium dichromate (K_{2}CrO_{7}) and sulphuric acid as oxidation reagent in organic analysis.
