= Reformatsky reaction =

Organic reaction

Named after	Sergey Reformatsky
Reaction type	Coupling reaction

Identifiers
Organic Chemistry Portal	reformatsky-reaction
RSC ontology ID	RXNO:0000036

The Reformatsky reaction (sometimes transliterated as Reformatskii reaction) is an organic reaction which condenses aldehydes or ketones with α-halo esters using metallic zinc to form β-hydroxy-esters:

The Reformatsky reaction

The organozinc reagent, also called a 'Reformatsky enolate', is prepared by treating an alpha-halo ester with zinc dust. The reaction was discovered by Sergey Nikolaevich Reformatsky.

Some reviews have been published.

== Structure of the reagent ==
The crystal structures of the THF complexes of the Reformatsky reagents tert-butyl bromozincacetate and ethyl bromozincacetate have been determined. Both form cyclic eight-membered dimers in the solid state, but differ in stereochemistry: the eight-membered ring in the ethyl derivative adopts a tub-shaped conformation and has cis bromo groups and cis THF ligands, whereas in the tert-butyl derivative, the ring is in a chair form and the bromo groups and THF ligands are trans. Note that, in contrast to lithium and boron enolates, which have the metal(loid)s exclusively bond to oxygen, the zinc enolate moiety in the Reformatsky reagents have zinc atoms that are simultaneously O- and C-bound and can therefore be described as "organometallic".

ethyl bromozincacetate dimer	tert-butyl bromozincacetate dimer

== Reaction mechanism ==
Zinc metal is inserted into the carbon-halogen bond of the α-haloester by oxidative addition 1. This compound dimerizes and rearranges to form two zinc enolates 2. Unlike lithium enolates and Grignard reagents, 2 is less nucleophilic and will not add to another ester group 1.

The oxygen on an aldehyde or ketone coordinates to the zinc to form the six-member chair like transition state 3. A rearrangement occurs in which zinc switches to the aldehyde or ketone oxygen and a carbon-carbon bond is formed 4. The resulting zinc alkoxide is also less susceptible to retro-aldol cleavage.

Acid workup 5,6 removes zinc to yield zinc(II) salts and a β-hydroxy-ester 7.

== Variations ==
In addition to aldehydes and ketones, Reformatsky enolates react with acid chlorides, imines, nitriles (see Blaise reaction), and nitrones. Moreover, metals other than zinc have also been used, including magnesium, iron, cobalt, nickel, germanium, cadmium, indium, barium, tin, and cerium. Additionally, metal salts are also applicable in place of metals, notably samarium(II) iodide, chromium(II) chloride, titanium(II) chloride, cerium(III) halides such as cerium(III) iodide, and titanocene(III) chloride.

In one variation of the Reformatsky reaction an iodolactam is coupled with an aldehyde with triethylborane in toluene at −78 °C.

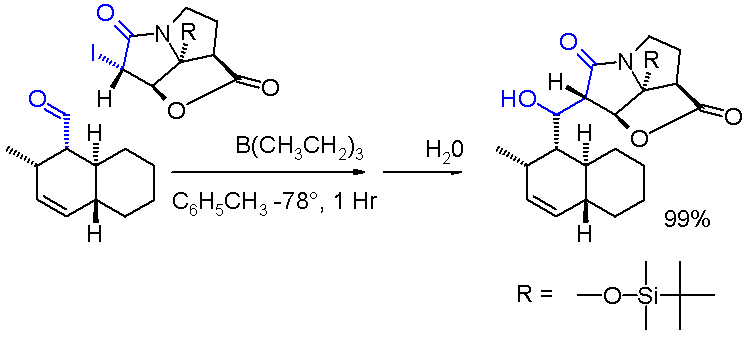
Reformatsky reaction Danishefsky variation

Appropriate choice of chiral ligands can cause asymmetric Reformatsky additions.

== See also ==
- Aldol reaction
- Blaise reaction
- Claisen condensation
- Organozinc chemistry
- Example use in total synthesis: Mukaiyama Taxol total synthesis (B ring construction)
