= Alexander Zaytsev (chemist) =

Russian chemist (1841-1910)

Aleksander Mikhaylovich Zaytsev
- Александр Михайлович Зайцев
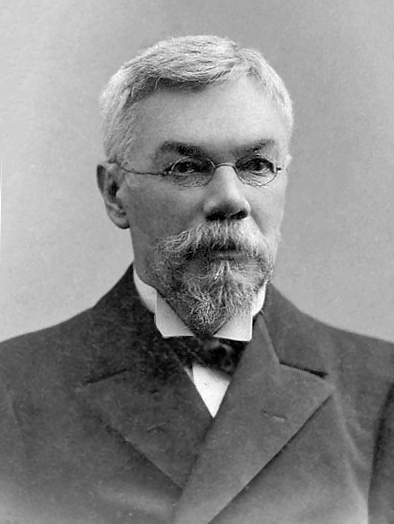
- Alexander Zaytsev in the late 19^{th} century
- Born: July 2, 1841; Kazan, Russian Empire
- Died: September 1, 1910 (aged 69); Kazan, Russian Empire
- Occupation: Chemist
- Known for: Zaytsev's rule

Aleksander Mikhaylovich Zaytsev, also Zaitsev, Saytzeff, or Saytzev (Russian: Алекса́ндр Миха́йлович За́йцев; 2 July 1841 – 1 September 1910) was a Russian chemist. He worked on organic compounds and proposed Zaytsev's rule, which predicts the product composition of an elimination reaction.

== Early years ==
Zaytsev was born in Kazan. He was the son of a tea and sugar merchant, who had decided that his son should follow him into the mercantile trades. However, at the urging of his maternal uncle, Zaytsev was allowed to enroll at University of Kazan to study economics. At this time, Russia was experimenting with the cameral system, meaning that every student graduating in law and economics from a Russian university had to take two years of chemistry. Zaytsev was thus introduced to Aleksandr Mikhailovich Butlerov.

Early on, Zaytsev began working with Butlerov, who clearly saw in him an excellent laboratory chemist, and whose later actions showed that he felt that Zaytsev was an asset to Russian organic chemistry. On the death of his father, Zaytsev took his diplom in 1862, and immediately went to western Europe to further his chemical studies, studying with Hermann Kolbe in Marburg, and with Charles Adolphe Wurtz in Paris. This went directly against the accepted norms of the day, which had the student complete the kandidat degree (today approximately equivalent to the doctor of philosophy degree, but then closer to the thesis for the B.Sc. (Hons.) degree in British universities), and then spend two or three years in study abroad (a komandirovka) before returning to Russia as a salaried laboratory assistant studying for the doctorate.

During his studies with Kolbe between 1862 and 1864, Zaytsev discovered sulfoxides and trialkylsulfonium salts. In 1864, he moved to Paris, where he worked for a year in the laboratories of Wurtz before returning to Marburg in 1865. At this time, Kolbe accepted a call to Leipzig, and Zaytsev, now out of money, returned to Russia. Upon his return, Zaytsev again joined Butlerov as an unpaid assistant. During this time, he wrote a successful kandidat dissertation.

== Career ==
In order to teach, he required either a master's degree from a Russian university, or a Ph.D. from a foreign university, so he wrote up his work on the sulfoxides and submitted it to the University of Leipzig where (probably thanks to Kolbe's influence) he was awarded the Ph.D. in 1866. With Zaytsev now holding the Ph.D., Butlerov was able to secure his appointment as an assistant in agronomy. (In March 1866 the Kazan University board voted for this appointment.) Two years later, Zaytsev was awarded his M. Chem. degree, and, the following year (1869) was appointed as Extraordinary Professor of Chemistry, the junior colleague of another Butlerov student, Vladimir Vasilyevich Markovnikov (1838–1904). Zaytsev submitted his Dr. Chem. dissertation in 1870, and was awarded the degree over the indirect objections of Markovnikov (as second examiner of the dissertation, Markovnikov had written an overtly positive assessment that was meant to be read between the lines). The same year, he was promoted to Ordinary Professor of Chemistry. This may have been one of the final straws for Markovnikov, who left Kazan University in 1871 for Odessa. Zaytsev continued at Kazan University until his death in 1910.

== Research ==
His research at Kazan was primarily concerned with the development of organozinc chemistry and the synthesis of alcohols. The first of these reactions had been reported by Butlerov in 1863, who prepared tert-butyl alcohol from dimethylzinc and phosgene. Zaytsev and his students Egor Egorevich Vagner (Georg Wagner, 1849–1903) and Sergei Nikolaevich Reformatskii (1860–1934) extended this reaction to a general synthesis of alcohols using alkylzinc iodides. This synthesis was the best way to make alcohols until the advent of the Grignard reaction in 1901. Reformatskii's work, which used the zinc compounds from alpha-bromoesters, led to the discovery of a synthetic reaction (the Reformatskii reaction) that is still used today. Zaitsev's Rule was reported in 1875, and appeared just as his nemesis, Markovnikov, (who had made a prediction which the rule contradicts) was taking the Chair at Moscow University. Zaytsev received several honors: he was elected as a Corresponding member of the Russian Academy of Science, an honorary member of Kiev University, and he served two terms as President of the Russian Physical-Chemical Society.

== Death ==
Zaytsev died on 1 September 1910 in Kazan.
