= Sergey Reformatsky =

Russian chemist (1860–1934)

Sergey Nikolaevich Reformatsky
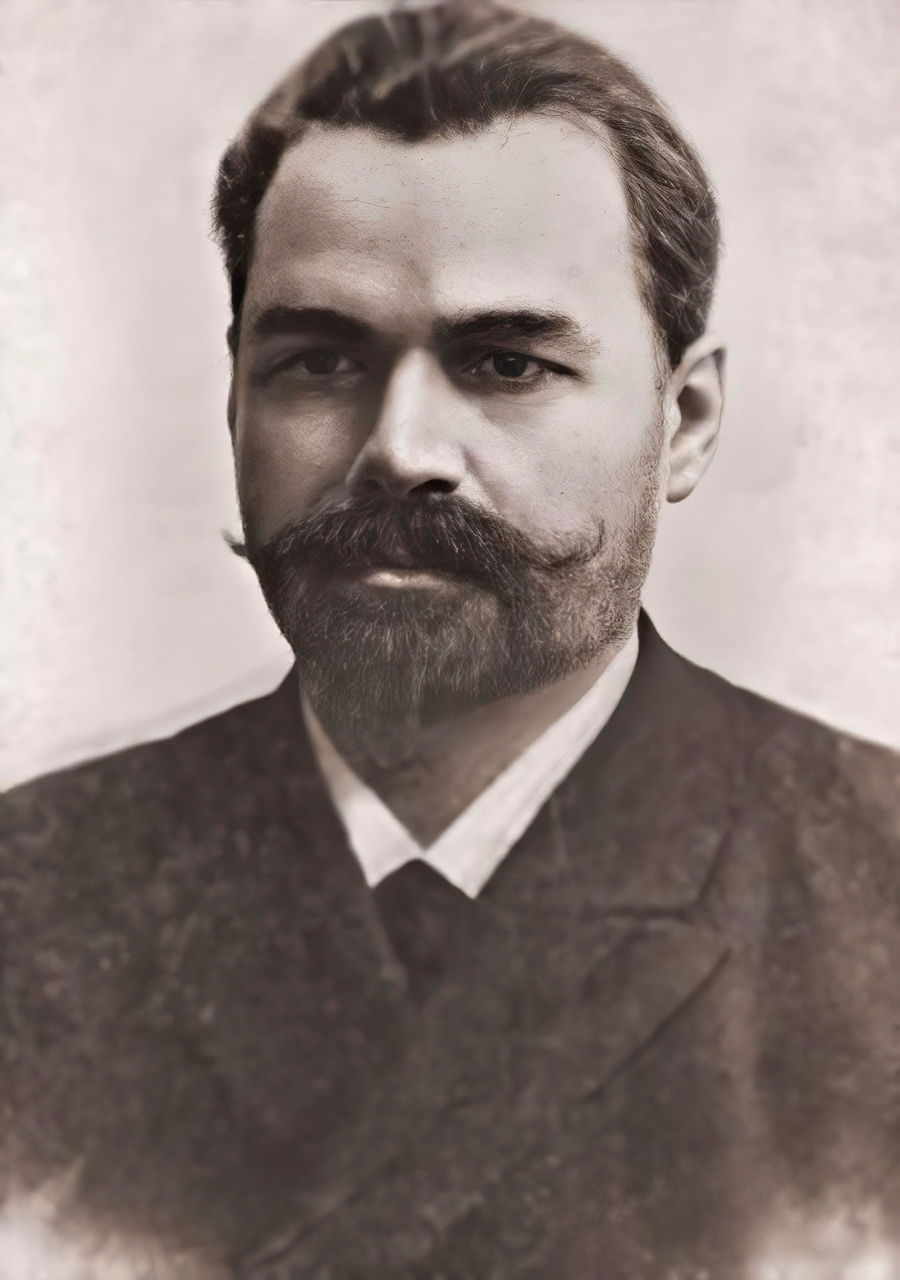
- Born: April 1, 1860; Borisoglebskoe, near Ivanovo, Kostroma Governorate, Russian Empire
- Died: July 28, 1934 (aged 74); Moscow, Russian SFSR, Soviet Union
- Education: University of Kazan
- Known for: Reformatskii reaction
- Scientific career
- Fields: Chemist
- Workplaces: University of Kiev
- Doctoral advisor: Alexander Mikhailovich Zaitsev, Wilhelm Ostwald

Sergey Nikolaevich Reformatsky (Russian: Серге́й Никола́евич Реформа́тский; 1 April 1860 – 28 July 1934) was a Russian chemist.

== Life ==
He was born as a son of a preacher in Borisoglebskoe, near Ivanovo. He studied at the University of Kazan under Alexander Mikhailovich Zaitsev until 1882. He went to Germany for further studies. He joined Victor Meyer at the University of Heidelberg and Wilhelm Ostwald at the University of Leipzig, getting his Ph.D. in 1891. The following year he was appointed professor at the University of Kiev, where he stayed the rest of his life.

== Work ==
In 1887 discovered the Reformatsky reaction, during which a zinc organic compound is the key component. The use of zinc in organic reactions was common at that time, but it was subsequently replaced by the more convenient magnesium. This was not possible for the reaction of α-chloro acids with ketones, because the magnesium based Grignard reagents are more reactive and lead to other products. This made the Reformatsky reaction a convenient way for the synthesis of β-hydroxy acids which were difficult to obtain with other methods.

He also authored the seminal textbook Nachal'nyĭ kurs organicheskoĭ khimii (Basic Course in Organic Chemistry), first published in 1893. This book became a cornerstone of organic chemistry education in the Soviet Union.

== Sources ==
- Hofmann, K. A. (1935). "Sitzung am 8. April 1935". Berichte der Deutschen Chemischen Gesellschaft (A and B Series). 68 (5): A61–A71. doi:10.1002/cber.19350680558.
