= Alexander Butlerov =

Russian chemist (1828–1886)

Alexander Mikhaylovich Butlerov
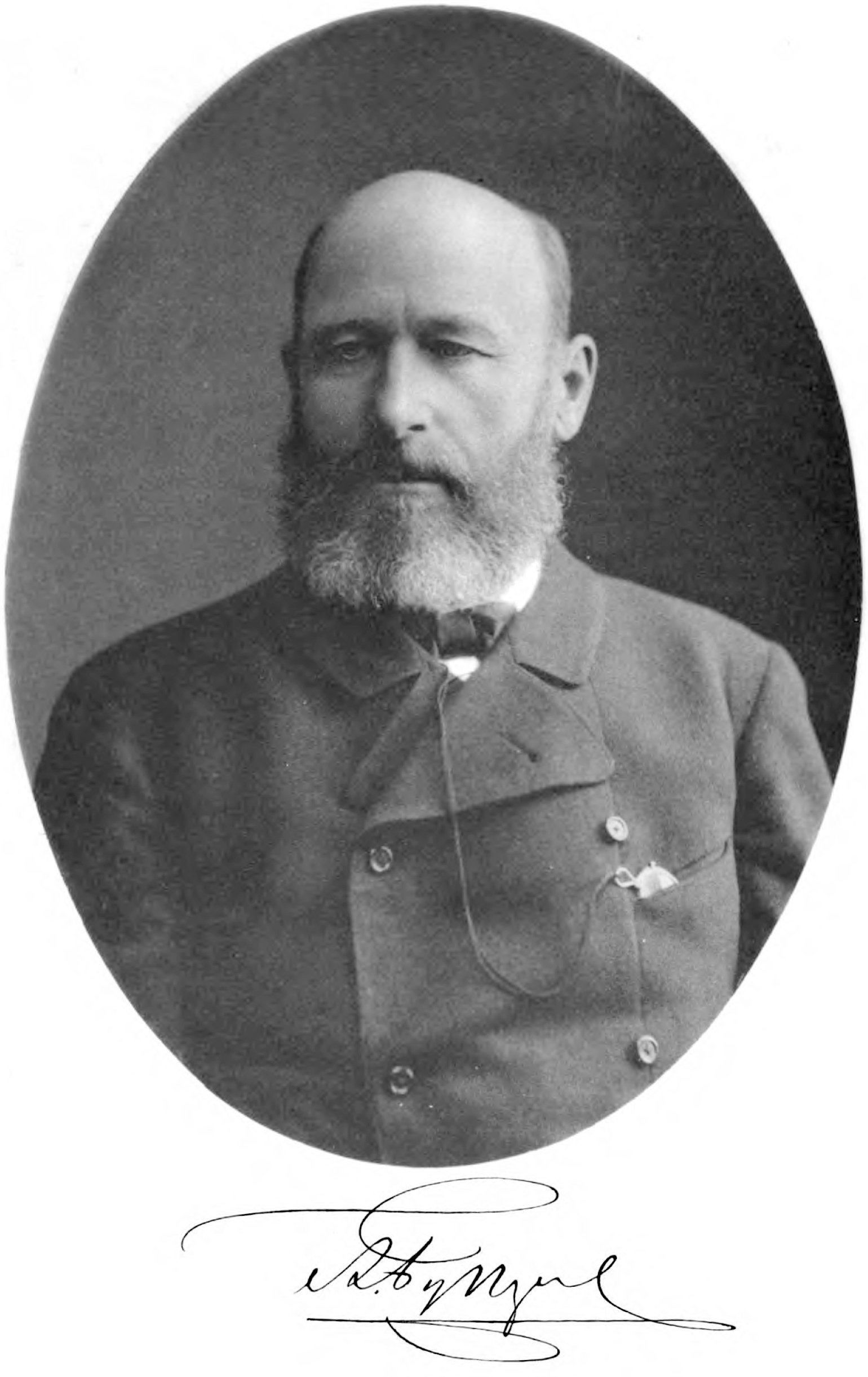
- Alexander Butlerov
- Born: 15 September 1828; Chistopol, Kazan Governorate, Russian Empire
- Died: 17 August 1886 (aged 57); Butlerovka, Kazan Governorate, Russian Empire
- Education: Kazan State University
- Known for: discovery of formaldehyde and hexamine
- Scientific career
- Fields: Chemistry
- Workplaces: University of St. Petersburg, Kazan State University
- Doctoral advisor: Nikolay Zinin
- Doctoral students: Alexey Yevgrafovich Favorsky, Vladimir Markovnikov, Alexander Mikhaylovich Zaytsev, Alexander Nikiforovich Popov

Alexander Mikhaylovich Butlerov (Russian: Алекса́ндр Миха́йлович Бу́тлеров; 15 September 1828 – 17 August 1886) was a Russian chemist, one of the principal creators of the theory of chemical structure (1857–1861), the first to incorporate double bonds into structural formulas, the discoverer of hexamine (1859), the discoverer of formaldehyde (1859) and the discoverer of the formose reaction (1861). He first proposed the idea of possible tetrahedral arrangement of valence bonds in carbon compounds in 1862.

The crater Butlerov on the Moon is named after him. In 1956 the Academy of Sciences of the USSR established the A. M. Butlerov Prize.

== Biography ==
Butlerov was born into a landowning family. In 1849 he graduated from the Imperial Kazan University. after which he worked there as a teacher. From 1860 to 1863 he was the rector. From 1868 to 1885 he was a professor of Chemistry at the Imperial St. Petersburg University. Butlerov was the chairman of the Chemistry Department of the Russian Physico-Chemical Society from 1878 to 1882.

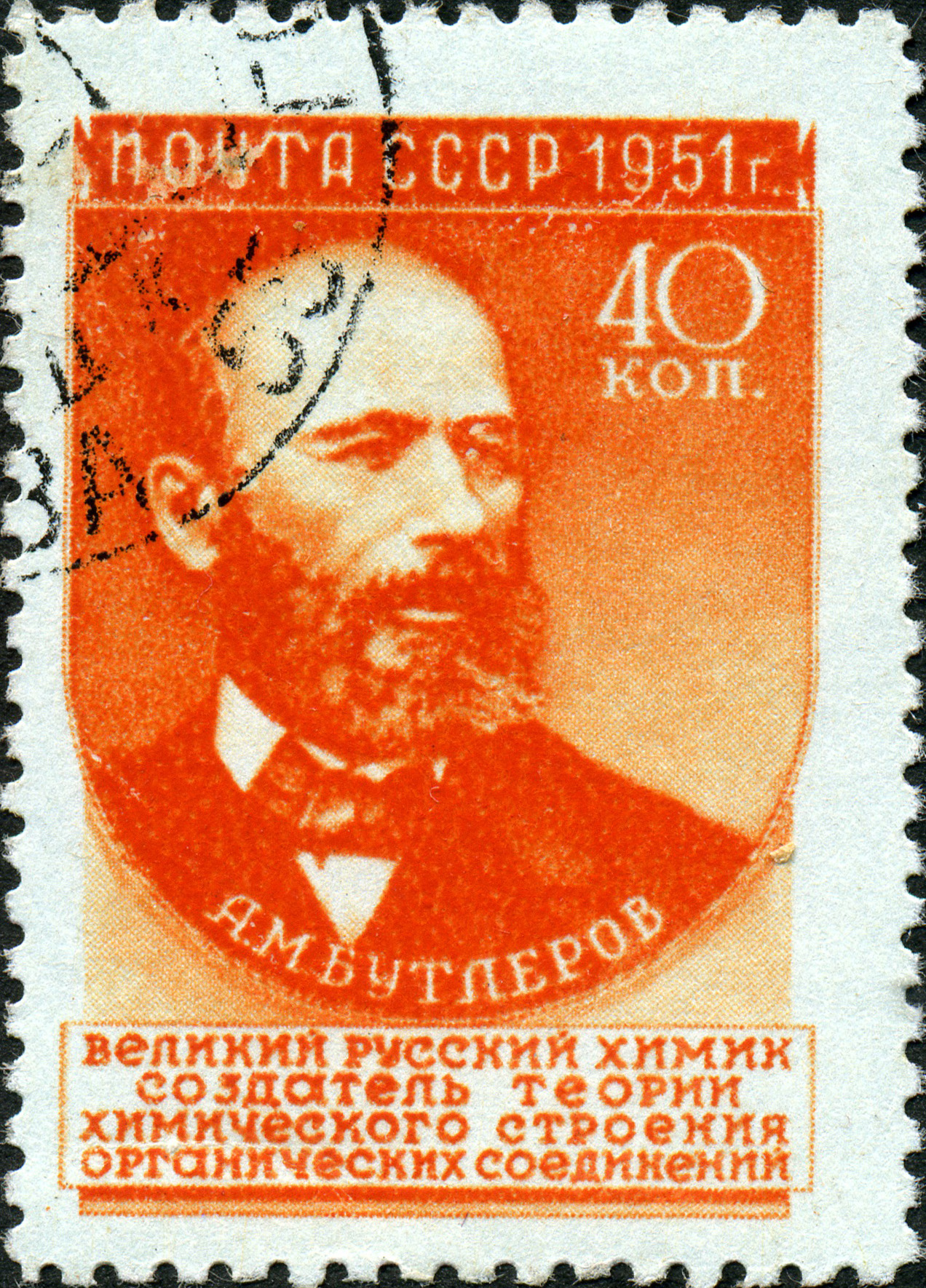
1951 Alexander Butlerov USSR postage stamp
