= Kazan National Research Technological University =

University in Kazan, Russia

Kazan National Research Technological University (KNRTU)
- Казанский национальный исследовательский технологический университет (КНИТУ)
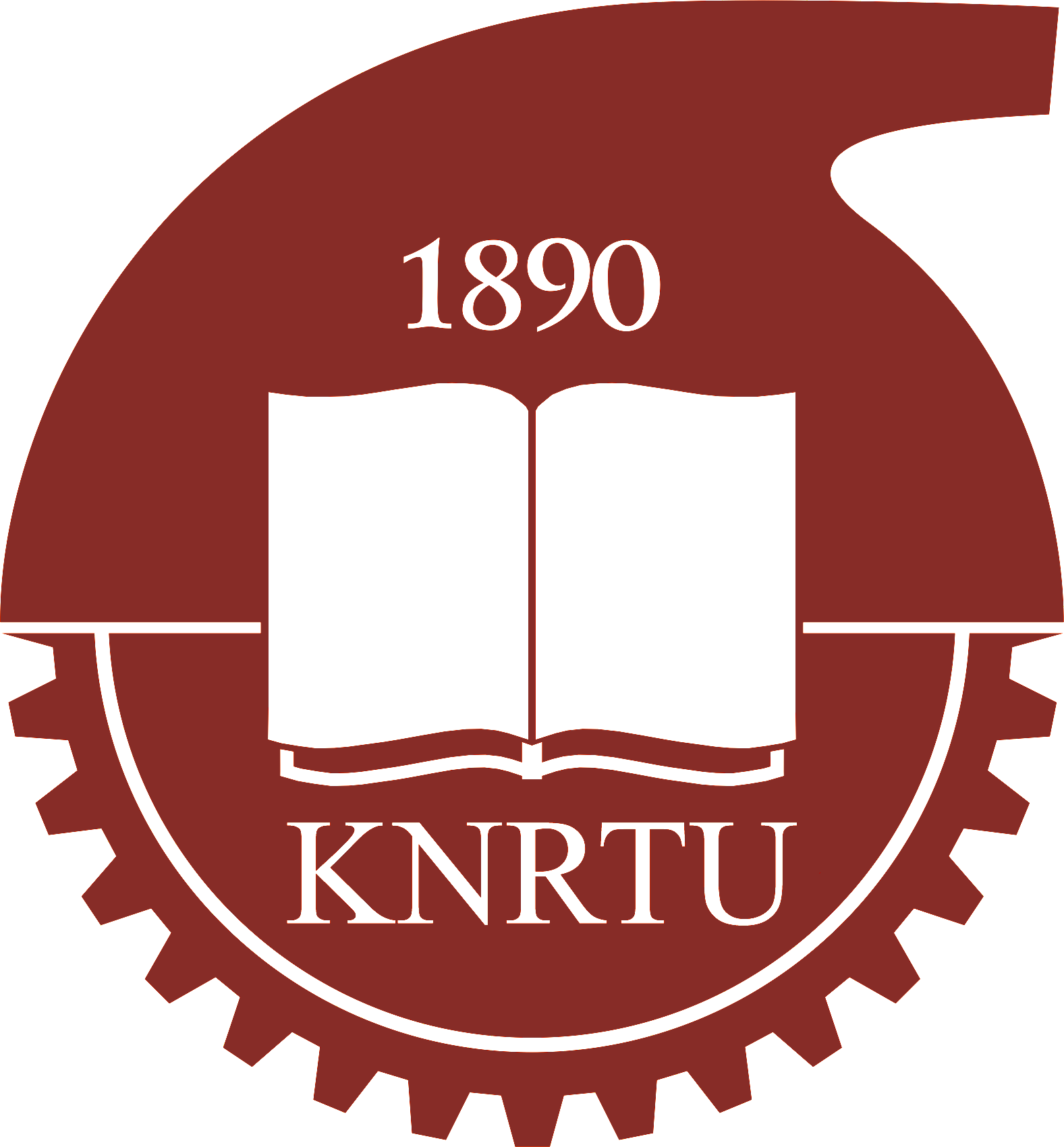
- Established: 1890
- Rector: Yuri Mikhailovich Kazakov
- Academic staff: 24
- Students: 27,000
- Location: Kazan, Tatarstan, Russia; 55°47′09″N 49°08′42″E
- Campus: Urban
- Website: https://www.kstu.ru/
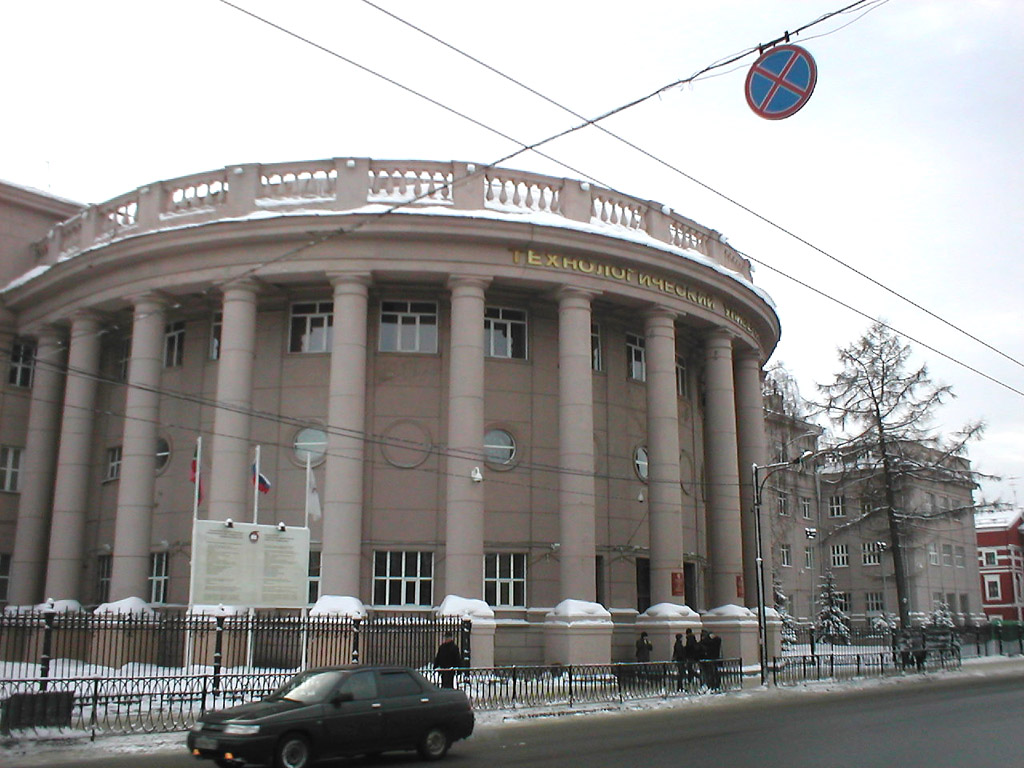

Kazan National Research Technological University, KNRTU is an innovational scientific educational complex. The University comprises 15 academic and research institutes; runs over 100 Specialist, Bachelor's, Master's Degree and Ph.D. programs; enrolls over 27,000 undergraduate and graduate students, 900 Ph.D. and 100 Post-Doc students from Russia and other countries; employs over 300 Full Professors, Doctors of Science and 800 Associate Professors, Ph.D.s; raises the budget of 1.4 billion rubles.

The partner institutions of Kazan National Research Technological University are 24 universities, research centers and international educational organizations in 13 countries. The University is one of the 6 Russian Universities which are members of Eurasia Pacific University Network (UNINET).

== History ==
The University derived from Kazan United industrial college opened in 1897. In 1919, it was transformed to Kazan Polytechnical Institute and in 1930 Kazan Chemical-Technological Institute (KCTI named after S.M. Kirov) was created on the basis of Polytechnical Institute and Chemical Faculty of Kazan State University. In 1992, KCTI was renamed to Kazan State Technological University (KSTU). In 2010, the University acquired the status of national research institute and was given its present name.

== Institutes ==
The University comprises 13 academic and research institutes; runs over 100 Specialist, Bachelor's, Master's Degree and Ph.D. programs; enrolls over 27 thousand undergraduate and graduate students, 900 Ph.D. and 100 Post-Doc students from Russia and other countries; and employs over 300 Full Professors, Doctors of Science and 800 Associate Professors, Ph.D.s.

Institutes are structural academic and research subdivisions of Kazan State Technological University. Institutes consist of faculties, which, in their turn, include academic departments.

== Academic Institutes ==
- Institute of Chemical Engineering and Technology
- Institute of Petroleum, Chemistry and Nanotechnologies
- Institute of Mechanical Engineering for Chemical and Petrochemical Industry
- Institute of Polymers
- Institute of Light Industry, Fashion and Design
- Institute of Automated Control Systems and Information Technologies
- Institute of Administration, Economics and Social Technologies
- Institute of Food Engineering and Biotechnology
- Institute of Military Education
- Institute of Additional Professional Education
- Institute of Lifelong Education
- Corporate University

== Research and design institutes ==
- Design Institute “Soyuzhimpromprojekt”
- Research Institute “Speckauchuk”
