= Aleksandr Arbuzov =

Russian chemist

- Александр Арбузов
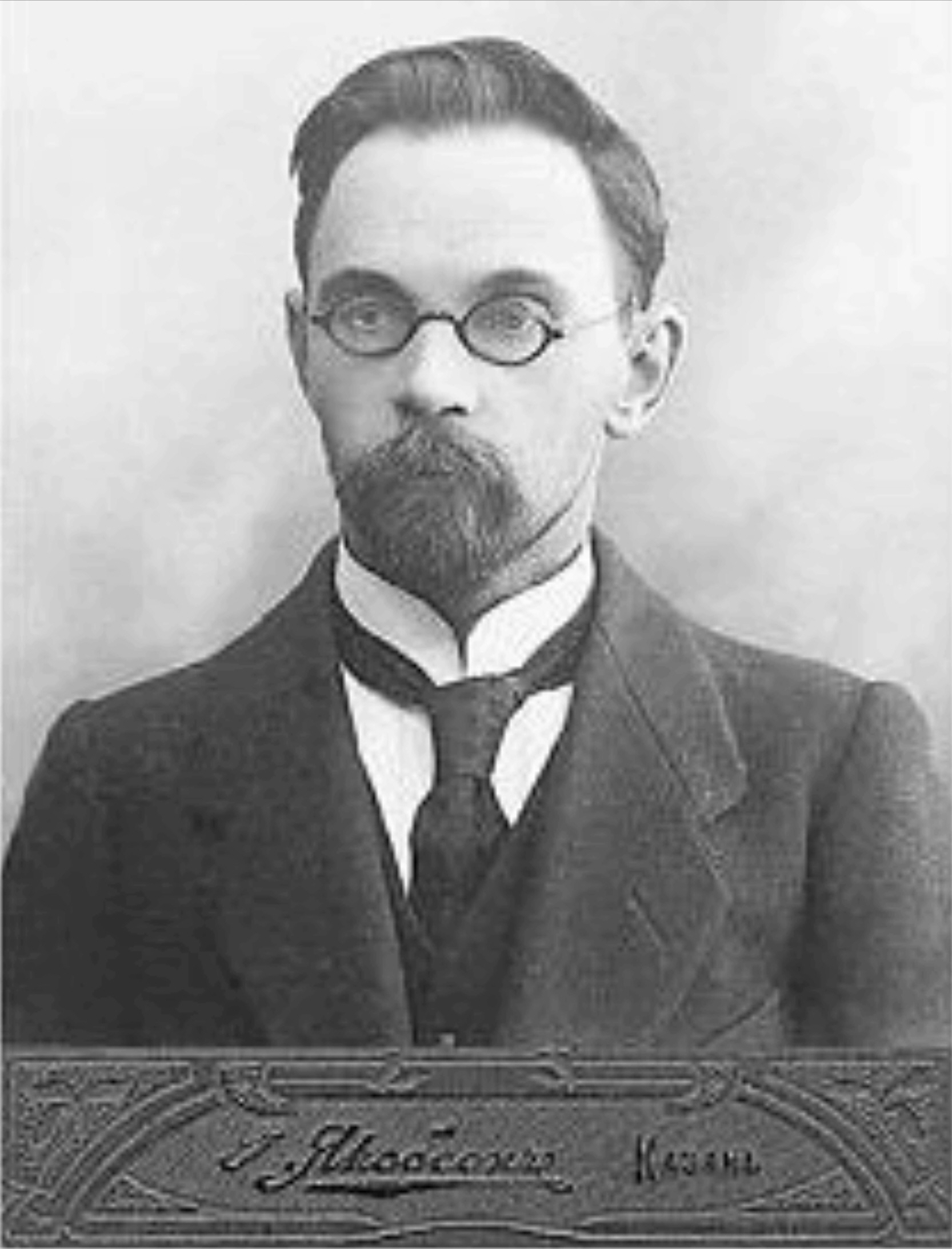
- Arbuzov in 1914
- Born: 12 October 1877
- Died: 22 January 1968 (aged 90)
- Education: University of Kazan
- Known for: Michaelis–Arbuzov reaction
- Scientific career
- Workplaces: University of Kazan
- Doctoral advisor: Alexander Mikhaylovich Zaytsev

Aleksandr Erminingeldovich Arbuzov (Russian: Алекса́ндр Ермининге́льдович Арбу́зов; 12 October 1877 – 22 January 1968) was a Russian and Soviet chemist who discovered the Michaelis–Arbuzov reaction.

A native of Bilyarsk, Arbuzov studied in the Kazan University under Alexander Zaytsev. He graduated in 1900 and became professor at the same university in 1911. After World War II he was put in charge of the Soviet Institute of Organic Chemistry.

In addition to his scientific research, Arbuzov also wrote A Brief Sketch of the Development of Organic Chemistry in Russian (1948).

== Awards ==
- Hero of Socialist Labour (1957)
- Orders of Lenin (July 31, 1944; June 10, 1945; June 24, 1950; September 19, 1953; September 11, 1957; September 9, 1967)
- Order of the Red Banner of Labour (1947)
- Stalin Prize, II degree (1943)
- Stalin Prize, I degree (1947)
