= List of Kazan State University rectors =

This is a list of Kazan State University rectors:

1. Yakovkin Ilya Fedorovich (1804–1813)
2. Braun Johann (Ivan Osipovich) (1814–1819)
3. Gavriil II'ich Solntsev (1819–1820)
4. Nikolski Grigori Borisovich (1820–1823)
5. Fuchs Karl (Karl Fedorovich) (1823–1827)
6. Nikolai Lobachevsky (1827–1846)
7. Ivan Mikhailovich Simonov (1846–1855)
8. Kowalewski Osip Mikhaylovich (1855–1860)
9. Alexander Butlerov (1860–1863)
10. Osokin Yevgraf Gigoryevich (1863–1872,1876–1880)
11. Kremlev Nikolay Aleksandrovich (1872–1876,1885–1889)
12. Kowalewski Nikolay Osipovich (1880–1882)
13. Nikolai Nikitich Bulich (1882–1885)
14. Konstantin Vasilievich Voroshilov (1889–1899)
15. Dmitri Dubyago (1899–1905)
16. Lyubimov Nikolay Matveyevich (1905–1906)
17. Nikolai Pavlovich Zagoskin (1906–1909)
18. Dormidontov Grigori Fedorovich (1909–1918)
19. Bolotov Yevgeni Aleksandrovich (1918–1921)
20. Ovchinnikov Aleksandr Aleksandrovich (1921–1922)
21. M. N. Cheboksarov
22. Chirkovski Vasili Vasilyevich (1923–1925)
23. Lunyak Andrey Ivanovich (1926–1928)
24. Galanza Petr Nikolayevich (1928–1929)
25. Segal Moisey Abramovich (1929–1930)
26. Vekslin Noson-Ber Zalmanovich (1931–1935)
27. Qamay Gilem Khayrievich / Qamay Ğilem Xäyri ulı /ghee-LEM khay-REE oo-LE / (1935–1937)
28. Sitnikov Kirill Prokofyevich (1937–1951)
29. Dmitry Yakovlevich Martynov Obituary (1951–1954)
30. Mikhail Tikhonovich Nuzhin (1954–1979)
31. Alexander Ivanovich Konovalov (1979–1990)
32. Konoplev Yuri Gennadyevich (1990–2001)
33. Salakhov Myakzyum Khalimullovich (2002–2010)
34. Gafurov Il'shat Rafkatovich (2010-)

== See also ==
- List of rectors of the Moscow State University
