= Kazan ethnic communities =

This is an article about ethnic groups in the city of Kazan, Russia.

== Tatars and Russians ==
The city's population is mainly composed of Tatars (about 48.8 percent) and Russians (about 46.9 percent).

== Other communities ==
=== Native Middle-Volgans ===
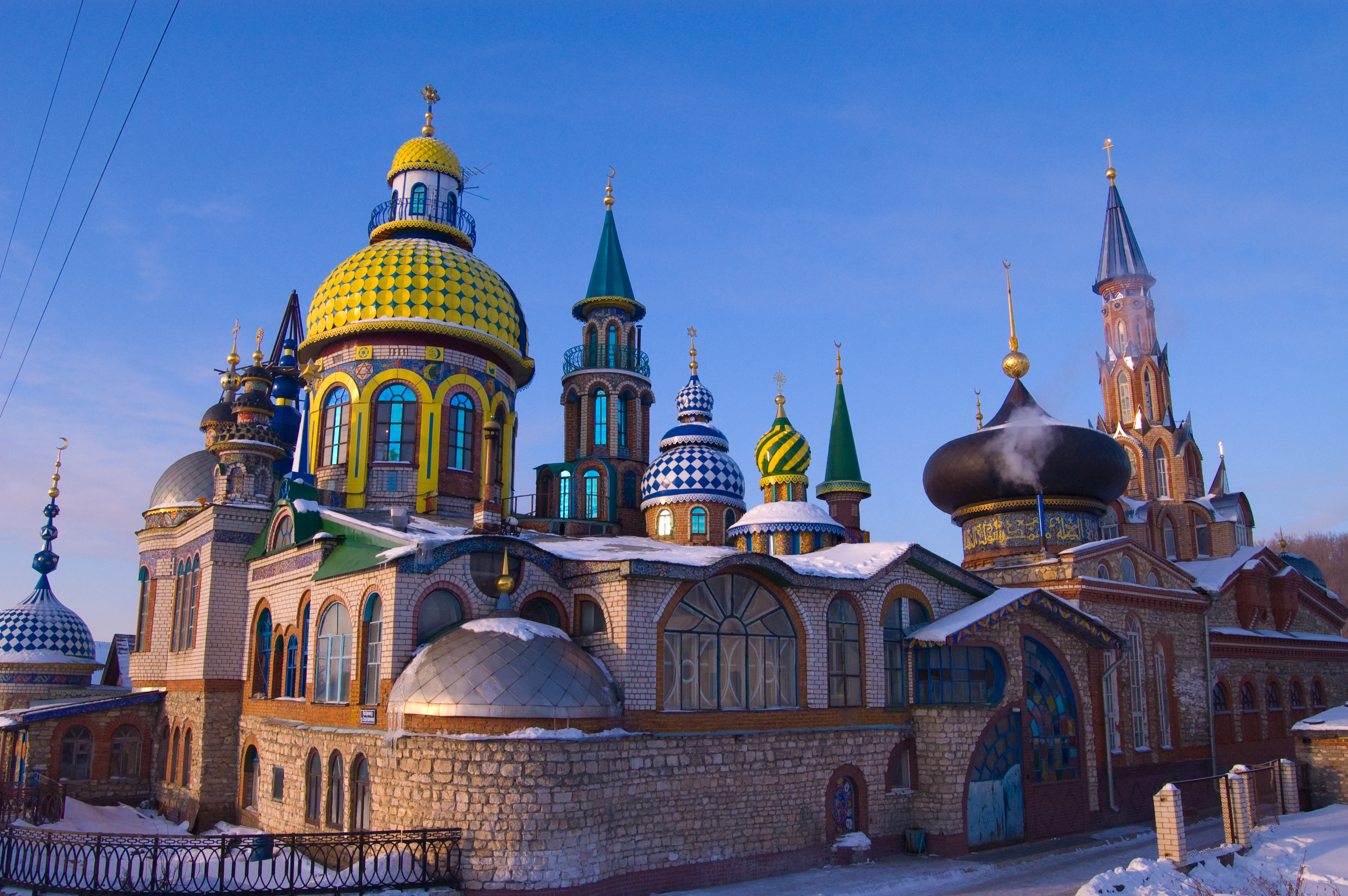
All Religions Temple. A building and cultural center built by the local artist Ildar Khanov.

The city's third primary ethnicity is the Chuvash (1.2%), who speak their own language. Chuvash is a Turkic language, which makes it a sister language to Tatar, but it is the most distinct among all the Turkic languages. The Chuvash are Russian Orthodox with some pre-Christian elements in their religion. Other nations native to the Middle Volga are the Maris (0.3%), Udmurts (0.1%), Mordvas (0.2%) and Bashkirs (0.2%). Some of them speak Tatar, some Russian and others their own languages. Bashkirs are normally Muslims. Others, like the Chuvash, are traditionally Orthodox Christian with some pre-Christian elements in their religion.

Some Mari come to Kazan for seasonal work, mostly woodwork and carpentry. They build summer houses and saunas for local people. Chuvash and Mari come to the city every day from their republics and sell potatoes and mushrooms at bazaars.

==== Ethnic Germans ====
Ethnic Germans came to Kazan from the 18th century. They served in the Russian Army, or worked in Kazan State University. Some of them are very famous in Kazan, particularly professor Karl Fuchs. During World War II, most of them were repressed and deported/ethnic-cleansed by Joseph Stalin's government.

Today, the remaining Germans of Kazan mostly speak Russian.

=== Other groups ===
==== Assurs (Assyrians) ====
A community of Assurs also live in Kazan. By tradition, they work at shoe repairing. Their community lives a closely guarded life, and they do not traditionally mix with other communities.

==== Jews of Kazan ====
Since Kazan was not part of the Pale of Settlement, the Jewish community formed relatively late. In 1861, the Jewish population was 184 and mostly consisted of veterans of the Czar's army. By 1897, the population had increased to 1,467 and it continued to grow during World War I as a number of refugees and Jews from Lithuania came to the city. In the 1926, there were 4,156 Jews living in Kazan, making up 2.3% of the population. In the Soviet era, Jewish life was repressed, although the restrictions on Jews and their religious observance were more relaxed in Kazan than other larger cities in the Soviet Union. Jews from Ukraine and other areas in Russia went to Kazan for university because the anti-Jewish quota was more relaxed. In 1970, the Jewish population was 8,000. About 4,000 Jews from Kazan left for the United States and Israel under Gorbachev. After the fall of the Soviet Union, the community reorganized and now has a number of communal organizations. Today, Jews number in the tens of thousands.

==== Immigrants in the Soviet period ====
During World War II a lot of the populations of what would become, after annexation during the war, the Western Soviet Union were deported to Kazan, including schools, educational institutes, and plants. Some of that population did not return to their native lands. They are: Jews, Ukrainians, Belarusians, Poles, and others (nearly 2.5% of population). They speak Russian, sometimes with Ukrainian accent, and many Jews also speak Tatar.

==== Immigrants in the 1990s ====
One of the biggest minorities of Kazan is the Azeri community.

Other Caucasians come from Dagestan, Georgia, Armenia and others. They often own cafés or work in construction.

Another big community is the Central Asian community, which includes Uzbeks, Tajiks, Roma (Lyuli branch) and Kyrgyz. Some of the Uzbeks and Tajiks own cafés or fast-food restaurants; they sell dried apricots, popular among Kazan citizens.
