= Acoustic paramagnetic resonance =

Absorption of sound by particles suspended in a magnetic field

In acoustics, acoustic paramagnetic resonance (APR) is a phenomenon of resonant absorption of sound by a system of magnetic particles placed in an external magnetic field. It occurs when the energy of the sound wave quantum becomes equal to the splitting of the energy levels of the particles, the splitting being induced by the magnetic field. APR is a variation of electron paramagnetic resonance (EPR) where the acoustic rather than electromagnetic waves are absorbed by the studied sample. APR was theoretically predicted in 1952, independently by Semen Altshuler and Alfred Kastler, and was experimentally observed by W. G. Proctor and W. H. Tanttila in 1955.

== History ==
After discovery of EPR in 1944, Evgeny Zavoisky predicted that the resonance phenomenon should not be restricted to radio or microwave absorption but could be extended to the sound waves. This idea was theoretically developed by his collaborator Semen Altshuler in 1952 and independently by Alfred Kastler; whereas Altshuler reported the effect on electron spins, Kastler calculated a nuclear spin system. The first experimental detection of the APR was reported in 1955 using ^{35}Cl nuclei in single crystals of sodium chlorate. This nuclear-APR work was extended to electron-APR in 1959. Further applications of APR to nuclear polarization and acoustic masers were later proposed by Kastler and Charles Townes.

== Mechanism ==

The APR effect is very similar to EPR: every electron or nucleus, either free or in a solid, has a magnetic moment and an associated with it spin. The spin can take integer or half-integer values, e.g. 1/2, 1, 3/2, etc., and the corresponding magnetic components m_{s} = ±1/2, ±1, ±3/2, etc. Here, the levels for plus and minus spin values are degenerate, that is have equal energies. Upon application of external magnetic field, those spins align either along the field or opposite to it; in terms of energy diagram, the energy levels split as shown in the figure. If a sound wave with a certain quantum energy E irradiates this spin system, at certain value of magnetic field, when E is equal to the magnetic splitting ΔE, resonant absorption of sound takes place, that is the APR effect.

Both in EPR and APR, the absorbed energy is transferred to the lattice via spin-phonon relaxation. However, whereas in EPR this process is of second order, and thus involves two phonons, the relaxation takes only one phonon in APR and is therefore much faster. This affects the lineshape of the resonance and its temperature dependence and allows probing the spin-lattice relaxation differently in EPR and APR.

== Experimental setup ==
APR is commonly measured using the pulsed echo technique at high sound frequencies of the order 100 MHz – 100 GHz. Two opposite sides of a studied crystal are mirror polished and made parallel to each other, and a piezoelectric crystal is attached to one side. It generates an ultrasound wave which is detected after multiple bouncing between the flat sides, and the signal attenuation serves as the measure of the resonant absorption. The crystal is located inside the magnet capable of providing static field corresponding to the applied frequency. For an electron with spin 1/2 and the splitting factor of the energy levels (the so-called spectroscopic splitting factor g) g = 2, the required field is 33–33000 Gauss for frequencies 100 MHz – 100 GHz.
