= Semen Altshuler =

Soviet physicist (1911–1983)

Semyon Altshuler
- Born: 24 September 1911; Vitebsk, Russian Empire ( now Belarus)
- Died: 24 January 1983 (aged 71); Kazan, USSR
- Education: Kazan University
- Known for: Theoretical prediction of acoustic paramagnetic resonance (1952)
- Scientific career
- Fields: Spectroscopy
- Workplaces: Kazan University, Lebedev Physical Institute
- Doctoral advisor: Igor Tamm

Semyon Alexandrovich Altshuler (also Altshuller, Al'tshuler or Al'shuller; German: Altschuler; Russian: Семён Александрович Альтшулер; September 24, 1911 – January 24, 1983) was a Soviet physicist known for his work in resonance spectroscopy and in particular for theoretical prediction of acoustic paramagnetic resonance in 1952.

== Early years ==
Altshuler was born in 1911 in Vitebsk, in the Russian Empire. He finished school in Nizhny Novgorod and later moved to Kazan, where he spent most of his life. In 1928, he entered the physics faculty of the Kazan University aiming to study theoretical physics. He graduated in 1932 and obtained a post-graduate scholarship, but had to change university due to the scholarship rules. He moved to Moscow to study with Igor Tamm whom he admired for his books on electricity and magnetism. In 1934, Altshuler and Tamm published a famous article which predicted the existence of the magnetic moment of neutron and correctly estimated its value and sign. This idea was so unusual then that even Niels Bohr who visited Moscow in 1934 could not accept it.

In 1934, Altshuler was recalled to Kazan by Evgeny Zavoisky who offered him a position of lecturer and a chair of the theoretical physics group. In Kazan, Altshuler closely collaborated with Zavoisky in his search for nuclear magnetic resonance and electron paramagnetic resonance. One indication of this collaboration was a paper published during the World War II with the names of Zavoisky, Altshuler and Kozyrev – Altshuler was absent at the time, serving in the Soviet army during the war, between 1941 and 1946, yet his ideas were valued by his group.

== World War II and after ==
As a member of the Communist Party, Altshuler has volunteered to serve in the Soviet army on the first day of Nazi Germany's invasion of the Soviet Union in World War II, 22 June 1941. After a short training course, he joined an anti-tank artillery unit and fought in it until the end of the war.

He returned to Kazan University in 1946, to work on the phenomenon of electron paramagnetic resonance (EPR), newly discovered by Zavoisky. In 1948, he demonstrated the so-called hyperfine interaction in EPR, that is splitting of the resonance signal due to electromagnetic interaction between the spins of the resonance electron and a nearby nucleus. This finding had great practical impact as it allowed detection of nuclei through resonance absorption by electrons. Although Zavoisky left the group in 1947 to work in nuclear physics in Moscow, he continued generating new ideas in the area of electron resonance. In particular, he suggested that the EPR phenomena could be extended from the radio to the sound waves. This idea was theoretically developed by Altshuler in 1952, and resulted in the prediction of a new phenomenon, acoustic paramagnetic resonance. Altshuler continued working on the resonance phenomena at Kazan University for the rest of his life. He died in 1983, leaving a school of students which included 10 professors and more than 40 PhD-level scientists.

== Awards ==
For his military achievements, Altshuler was awarded three Orders of the Patriotic War and the rank of a major. He also received the Order of the Red Star, Order of the Red Banner of Labour and Order of the Badge of Honour. In 1976, he was elected as an Associated Member of the Russian Academy of Sciences.

== Bibliography ==
- Boris I. Kochelaev (1995). The beginning of paramagnetic resonance. World Scientific. ISBN 981-02-2114-2.
