= Institute of Philology and Intercultural Communication =

Educational institute in Kazan, Russia

Coordinates: 55°47′3.7″N 49°7′0.1″E

- Институт филологии и межкультурной коммуникации
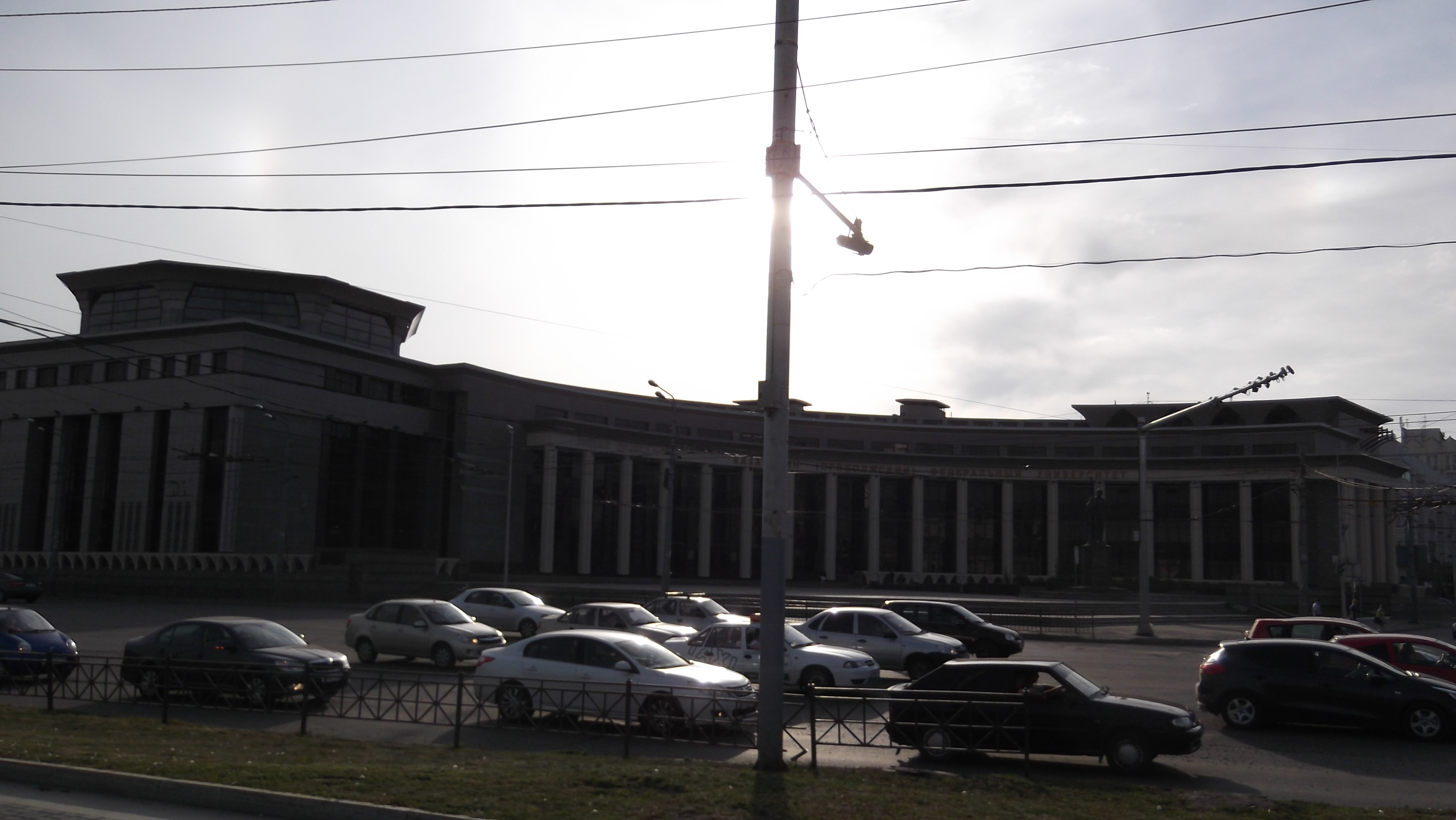
- Director: Radif Rifkatovich Zamaletdinov
- Academic staff: 300
- Students: 4500
- Location: 2 Tatarstan, Kazan 420008, Tatarstan, Russia, Kazan, Tatarstan, Russia
- Campus: Both urban and suburban
- Colours: Blue/Grey
- Website: kpfu.ru/eng/academic-units/humanities/institute-of-philology-and-intercultural

Institute of Philology and Intercultural Communication, formerly Kazan Imperial University, is a higher educational institution of Kazan, one of the largest institutes of Kazan (Volga region) Federal University. IPIC has more than 4500 students, 300 teachers and staff members, including 58 Ph.D and 175 candidates of sciences, 11 teachers from foreign countries. The Institute comprises 3 academic divisions: the Leo Tolstoy Higher School of Russian and Foreign Philology, the Gabdulla Tukay Higher School of National Culture and Education and the I.A. Baudouin de Courtenay Higher School of Russian Language and Intercultural Communication. The Institute trains philologists and educators with expertise in linguistics, literary studies, Russian, Tatar and foreign languages, interpretation and translation, educational technologies, design, music, and choreography.

== History ==
IPIC history began in 1804 with the opening day of the philology department of Kazan Imperial University. IPIC is based on two major universities of the country- Kazan State University and Tatar State University of Humanities and Education, originating from Kazan Imperial University (established in 1804), as well as Kazan Teachers' Institute (founded in 1876), later known as Kazan State Pedagogical University.

== Structure ==
- Leo Tolstoy Higher School of Russian and Foreign Philology
- Gabdulla Tukay Higher School of National Culture and Education
- I.A. Baudouin de Courtenay Higher School of Russian Language and Intercultural Communication
- Scientific and educational centers (SEC): SEC of Russian and Slavic Studies, SEC of « Kayum Nasyri Institute", SEC of multilingual and cross-cultural studies, Baudouin de Courtenay linguistics SEC.
- Kazan International linguistic center
- Youth Theater "Mizgel"
- Journal “Philology and Culture”
- Journal “Tatarica”

== Directions ==
IPIC mission - to promote the humanities and education development.

The Institute trains qualified specialists in the field of philology, arts and intercultural communication. IPIC students comprehend the world of language, literature, art, and learn technical and literary translation from various languages.

Major fields of study:

- Philology: Russian, Tatar, Foreign.
- Teacher training education: Russian language and literature, Tatar language and literature, foreign languages - English, German, French, Spanish, Chinese, Turkish.
- Culture and art: design, music and fine arts.

== Priority research areas ==
- Language and culture in a multi-ethnic environment
- Neurolinguistics. Clinical Linguistics
- Mathematical and computational linguistics
- Modern educational technology in a multicultural language environment

In 2016 Kazan Federal University was ranked in the top 200 in the QS subject ranking in linguistics. The contribution of IPIC scholars and professors to this achievement is indisputable.

== Graduates ==
IPIC graduates work in a variety of areas: research, education, mass media - television, newspapers, radio, the press-service, advertising agencies and PR-agencies, as well as in government and commercial organizations.

- Minullina T.I. - Head of the Investment Promotion Agency of the Republic of Tatarstan;
- Nasyrova A.M. - Director of international multilingual kindergartens’ network "Bala-City";
- Osokin D.S. – a novelist, a poet, a playwright, a writer, a scholar in folklore;
- Russ A.B. – a Russian poet. She was born in Kazan in 1981. She graduated from Kazan State University;
- Turanova Y.A. - Editor in chief of the journal “Courage”;
- Fazleeva L.R. - Assistant of the President of the Republic of Tatarstan;
- Ibragimova E.M. - a Russian actress and TV presenter;
- Yakhina G.S. - a modern Russian writer.

== Interesting facts ==
Kazan International linguistic center (KLMC) works on the basis of IPIC where everyone can learn English, German, French, Spanish and other languages, get an additional qualification of an interpreter in professional communication, etc. Moreover, here students can prepare for passing the following exams: Unified State Exam (EGE), General State Exam (OGE) and Unified Republic exam (ERE) and for participating in school competitions. KLMC is certified for a number of international and national exams: Cambridge International Examinations, TOEFL, French language exam in tourism and hotel business (CHAMBRE DE COMMERCE ET D’INDUSTRIE DE PARIS), etc.

IPIC actively participates in realizing the state program "Preservation, study and development of the state languages of the Republic of Tatarstan and other languages in the Republic of Tatarstan for 2014 - 2020 years." Among the projects implemented under this program are:

- Tatar language online school "Ana tele" - a free educational program teaching the Tatar language
- Emergency linguistic assistance - free language services in the Russian and Tatar languages
- Kayum Nasyri Institute - scientific and educational center, carrying out support, promotion and development of the Tatar language and culture in the Russian Federation, and other foreign countries
- Tatar language certification center - the center of language tests creating and carrying out language certification of the Tatar language in accordance with international standards in the field of testology and certification.
