= Anna Bērzkalne =

Latvian teacher and folklorist

- Bērzkalne, by Foto Klio (1915–1930)
- Born: 15 January 1891; Āriņi, Vējava Parish (now Madona Municipality), Kreis Wenden, Governorate of Livonia, Russian Empire
- Died: 1 March 1956 (aged 65); Riga, Latvian Soviet Socialist Republic
- Education: Kazan Higher Women's Courses; University of Tartu
- Occupations: educator, folklorist
- Years active: 1920–1956
- Awards: Krišjānis Barons Prize (1933)

Anna Bērzkalne (15 January 1891 – 1 March 1956) was a Latvian teacher and folklorist who founded the Archives of Latvian Folklore in 1924 and headed the organization for its first five years. Her analysis of Latvian folk ballads was awarded the Krišjānis Barons Prize in 1933. She was the first Latvian to earn a degree in Folkloric Studies and is recognized as one of the central figures in developing folkloric study as an academic discipline in Latvia.

== Early life ==
Anna Bērzkalne was born on 15 January 1891 in Āriņš, Vējava Parish (now Madona Municipality), Kreis Wenden, in the Governorate of Livonia of the Russian Empire to Ede (née Reinson) and Juris Bērzkaln. She was the oldest of the couple's five children and was born in her mother's family home. In 1895, they purchased another home in Čiglas in Vestiena Parish. She attended the Vējava Parish School and then between 1903 and 1908 studied at the private Atis Ķeniņš Gymnasium.

Having qualified as a teacher, between 1909 and 1911 Bērzkalne taught at the Ķemeri School in the Alsviķi Parish. Accompanying a relative in the army, in 1912, she traveled first to the Vladimir Governate and then went to Ussuriysk, before enrolling in 1913 in the Kazan Higher Women's Courses. She studied in the Russian-Slavic philology department, taking linguistics and folklore courses under Walter Anderson. Anderson was one of the leading instructors of the Finnish School of Russian Folklore. Rather than evaluating the artistic form or structure and style of folklore, Anderson advocated comparisons of historical and geographical variations of folk tales and legends over time. In 1917, she defended her thesis О фонетических изменениях в индоевропейских языках (On Phonetic Changes in Indo-European Languages) and obtained her Candidate of Philology degree.

== Career ==
After receiving her diploma, Bērzkalne worked in Kazan at the Latvian Refugee School. She then headed the Department of Education Statistics and from 1919 worked at the Volga Water Transport Control. In 1920, after the conclusion of the Latvian War of Independence, she returned to Latvia and began teaching at the Riga State Secondary School No. 2. Though she did not particularly enjoy teaching Latvian language classes, the job provided her with a steady income and allowed her to carry on with her research. She remained at School No. 2 until 1944.

While still teaching, in 1922, Bērzkalne resumed her academic studies with Anderson, studying linguistics and folklore at the University of Tartu. In 1924, she founded and became the head of the Archives of Latvian Folklore. The Archives was a repository for national folklore and supported folklore researchers. It was the "first of its kind" in the Baltic states. Between 1924 and 1927, she made research trips to Denmark, Finland and Germany to study the archival methods in use abroad. Bērzkalne corresponded extensively with over three dozen Finnish School folklorists, such as Elsa Enäjärvi-Haavio, Martti Haavio, Kaarle Krohn, Oskar Loorits, Viljo Mansikka, and Uuno Taavi Sirelius. Between 1927 and 1942 she compiled bibliographies of Latvian folklore for publication in the Volkskundliche Bibliographie (Ethnographic Bibliography) printed by Walter de Gruyter & Co. of Berlin. In 1929, Bērzkalne was asked to resign as head of the Archives. Ostensibly, a dispute occurred as to whether the Archives should be under the control of the Authority of Monuments or the People's Commissariat for Education. Given that academic circles were almost entirely male at that time, she was replaced by Karlis Straubergs, the Minister of Education.

In the 1930s, she published the Finnish international journal, Folklore Friends' Communications, analyzing various folk stories. In 1933, her publication as No. 123 in the series, Tipu rādītājs K. Barona Latvju dainu garākām dziesmām (Types of [Krišjānis] Barons' Longer Latvian Songs), was awarded the Krišjānis Barons Prize. In 1935, Bērzkalne completed her doctoral studies in Tartu. She purposely wrote her thesis in English rather than German as a form of non-violent resistance against the Nazi occupation of Latvia during World War II. She defended her thesis, The Song of the Youth Who Died in Sorrow: Its Primary Form and Latvian Versions, in 1942 and became the first Latvian folklorist to obtain a doctoral degree in comparative folkloristics. Her degree was not recognized by the Soviet authorities.

In 1945, the Archives of Latvian Folklore moved to the Institute of Folklore at the University of Latvia and Bērzkalne returned. Her strict use of the Finnish School drew criticism in the post-war period from Jānis Niedre, who was developing a new Soviet method for folklore studies. Bērzkalne believed that ideological demands on academic study were foolish, but she took care to improve her qualifications so that she could continue to work in the profession. Between 1945 and 1950, she lectured at the Latvian State University on folklore and worked as a research assistant at the Institute of Folklore, but Niedre's attacks on her research methods forced her to attempt to adapt to the new Soviet methods.

Along with other scholars of the interwar period, Bērzkalne was ostracized for her past work and the new materials she tried to present which aligned with the ideals, though not the methodology, of the new Soviet themes, were rejected by publishers. Unable to sustain basing her research on the "pseudo-scholarly Soviet principles", she openly criticized Niedre's methods and was terminated from her post. Hoping to re-qualify by taking examinations in Moscow to continue with folkloric research, her plans were abandoned after health concerns forced her to move in with her brother's family. She became reliant on him for financial support.

== Death and legacy ==
Bērzkalne died on 1 March 1956 and was buried at the Forest Cemetery in Riga. After her death, she was ignored during the Soviet period, but her work has been revived by post-Soviet scholars. She is recognized as the first Latvian to earn a degree in Folkloric Studies and as the founder of the Archives of Latvian Folklore. She is also considered a central figure in developing folkloric study as an academic discipline in Latvia. The author of 52 studies, her publications attempted to bring both Latvian folklore to international audiences and bring international folklore to Latvian audiences. Her papers are housed in the Academic Library of the University of Latvia.

== Selected works ==
- Bērzkalne, Anna (1927). "Mēmie pagasti" [Mute parishes]. Izglītības Ministrijas Mēnešraksts (in Latvian) (12). Riga, Latvia: Latvian Ministry of Education.
- Bērzkalne, Anna (1937). Pamatjēdzieni par tautas dzeju [Basic Concepts of Folk Poetry] (in Latvian). Riga, Latvia: D. Zeltiņš. OCLC 42294204.
- Bērzkalne, Anna (1938). "Typenverzeichnis lettischer Volksromanzen in der Sammlung Kr. Barons' 'Latvju Dainas'" [Type Index of Latvian Folk Ballads in K. Baron's Collection 'Latvju Dainas']. Folklore Fellows' Communications (in German) (123). Helsinki, Finland: Finnish Academy of Science and Letters. ISSN 0014-5815.
- Bērzkalne, Anna (1942). The Song of the Youth who Died in Sorrow. Its Primary Form and Latvian Versions (PhD). Tartu, Estonia: University of Tartu.
- Bērzkalne, Anna (1949). Līdzīgi motīvi latviešu bezatskaņu četrrindās un krievu atskaņpantos (častuški) [Similar Motifs in Latvian Unrhymed Quatrains and Russian Rhymes (chastusha)] (in Latvian). unpublished manuscript submitted to the Archives of Latvian Folklore.
- Bērzkalne, Anna (1949). Biedrs Staļins padomju tautu dziesmās [Comrade Stalin in the Songs of the Soviet Peoples] (in Latvian). unpublished manuscript submitted to the Latvijas Universitātes Akadēmiskā bibliotēka.
- Bērzkalne, Anna (1950). V. I. Ļeņina tēls padomjtautu dzejā [V. I. Lenin in the Poetry of the Soviet Peoples] (in Latvian). unpublished manuscript submitted to the Latvijas Universitātes Akadēmiskā bibliotēka.
- Bērzkalne, Anna (1950). Biedrs Staļins padomjtautu dziesmās kā sociālistiskās celsmes vadītājs [Comrade Stalin as the Leader of Constructing Socialism in the Songs of the Soviet Peoples] (in Latvian). unpublished manuscript submitted to the Latvijas Universitātes Akadēmiskā bibliotēka.
