= Yevgeny Zavoisky =

Soviet physicist (1907–1976)

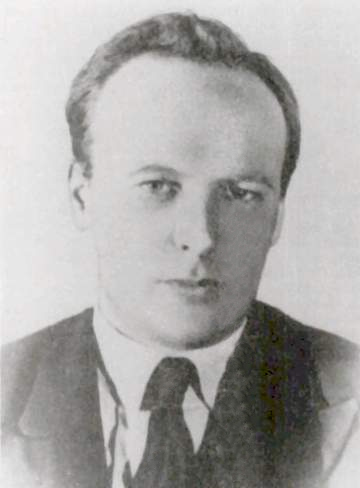
- Born: Yevgeny Konstantinovich Zavoisky; 28 September [O.S. 15 September] 1907; Mohyliv-Podilskyi, Podolian Governorate, Russian Empire
- Died: 9 October 1976 (aged 69); Moscow, Soviet Union
- Education: Kazan University
- Known for: Discovery of electron paramagnetic resonance (1944)
- Awards: Stalin Prize (1949), Lenin Prize (1957), International EPR Society Prize (1977, posthumously)
- Scientific career
- Fields: Spectroscopy
- Workplaces: Kazan University, Arzamas-16, Institute of Atomic Energy

Signature
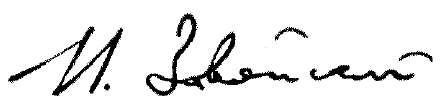

Yevgeny Konstantinovich Zavoisky (Russian: Евгений Константинович Завойский; September 28, 1907 – October 9, 1976) was a Soviet physicist known for discovery of electron paramagnetic resonance in 1944. He likely observed nuclear magnetic resonance in 1941, well before Felix Bloch and Edward Mills Purcell, but dismissed the results as not reproducible. Zavoisky is also credited with design of luminescence camera for detection of nuclear processes in 1952 and discovery of magneto-acoustic resonance in plasma in 1958.

== Early years ==
Zavoisky was born in 1907 in Mohyliv-Podilskyi, a town in the south of Russian Empire (now in Vinnytsia Oblast, Ukraine). His father Konstantin Ivanovich was a military doctor and mother Elizaveta Nikolaevna was trained as a teacher. In 1910, Zavoisky family moved to Kazan – a major Russian university city – for the sake of better education and well-being of their five children. There, Konstantin Ivanovich obtained a respectable job and a large apartment, which he equipped with equipment and books for home experiments with his children. Yevgeny, in particular, was keen to electromagnetism.

The October Revolution of 1917 brought difficult times. Konstantin Ivanovich died in 1919 from exhaustion, and the family moved to a small rural town to survive the hunger period. They returned to Kazan in 1925. In 1926, Yevgeny entered the faculty of physics at Kazan University. By that time, he was already an experienced amateur engineer who had assembled his own radio receivers and had numerous ideas of new inventions and measurements. Zavoisky established himself as a talented student and researcher. He was sent to Saint Petersburg to continue his studies and after returning to Kazan had worked in the laboratory of oscillations at Kazan University. After defending his PhD in 1933, he became the laboratory head. His research directions included generation of ultrashort waves; study of their physical and chemical effects on matter, including the effect on seed germination; and investigation of superregenerative effect. The seed germination topic was a reflection of that difficult period when scientists were required to try helping the Russian economy, which was recovering from the years of wars.

== Work on resonance phenomena ==
Zavoisky started systematic studies on interaction of electromagnetic waves with matter in 1933. He formed a group of talented experimentalists and theorists of various background, which included Boris Kozyrev, A. V. Nesmelov and later Semen Altshuler. He also visited several laboratories in major Russian cities and found that the experimental techniques in this research field were undeveloped. He was particularly dissatisfied with poor detection sensitivity and spent much effort on improving it using better detectors and electronic circuitry.

Zavoisky was much interested in the pioneering results obtained by Isidor Isaac Rabi in 1938 on interaction of molecular beams with electromagnetic waves in a static magnetic field, that is nuclear magnetic resonance (NMR). Eight years later, in 1946, Felix Bloch and Edward Mills Purcell refined the technique for use on liquids and solids, for which they shared the Nobel Prize in Physics in 1952. Zavoisky too tried to detect NMR in solids and liquids around 1940–1941. He had a sensitive enough detection system and managed to obtain the resonance signals. However, the strict requirement for the spatial homogeneity of the magnetic field were likely not met. The signals were unstable and poorly reproducible and thus were discarded. The work was interrupted by World War II and had not been resumed.

Instead, starting from 1943, Zavoisky focused on electron paramagnetic resonance (EPR), which is much less demanding for the homogeneity of magnetic field. On the other hand, it requires much more sensitive detection electronics, but Zavoisky was well prepared in this area. In particular he had replaced the calorimetric (thermal) detection of C. J. Gorter by a much more sensitive electronic technique of grid current. A further improvement was addition of a small AC magnetic field to the main static magnetic field. This dramatically increased the detection sensitivity and allowed easy amplification of the resonance signal and outputting it directly to an oscilloscope. In 1944, EPR signals were detected in several salts, including hydrous copper chloride (CuCl_{2}·2H_{2}O), copper sulfate and manganese sulfate. The results were revolutionary and were first not accepted even by the Soviet scientists (including Pyotr Kapitsa). The doubts were dispersed when Zavoisky visited Moscow, assembled an EPR spectrometer from scratch and reproduced his results there. In 1945, Zavoisky defended his habilitation on the phenomenon of electron paramagnetic resonance.

== Teaching ==
Zavoisky was a popular teacher who focused on demonstrations rather than theories. He himself showed various cryogenic phenomena, such as hardening and shattering of matter upon freezing. One experiment nearly resulted in his arrest by the internal police. Zavoisky demonstrated interference of polarized light in a biaxial crystal that resulted in an encircled swastika-like image projected onto the screen in front of a large audience. The demonstration crystals were soon confiscated and analyzed by a special commission, seeking relation between the experiment and Nazi Germany, and only a series of letters from scientists settled the matter.

== Late years ==
In 1947, upon invitation from Igor Kurchatov, Zavoisky moved from Kazan to Moscow, to work in the institute of the Academy of Sciences of the Soviet Union which later became the Institute of Atomic Energy (IAE). He was then moved to the classified location Arzamas-16 and participated in the Soviet atomic bomb project. Upon return to IAE, he worked on detectors of ultrafast processes and in 1952 developed a novel luminescence camera for detection of nuclear processes. Starting from 1958, he studied plasma and nuclear fusion related phenomena and discovered magneto-acoustic resonance in plasma in the same year.

A serious illness took him away from science in 1972. Zavoisky died in 1976 in Moscow.

== Awards and honors ==
Zavoisky was awarded the Stalin Prize (1949), the Lenin Prize (1957) and Hero of Socialist Labour (1969), as well as two Orders of Lenin. On 23 October 1953, he became an Associated Member of the Academy of Sciences of the Soviet Union and on 26 June 1964 was elected as Academician.

In 1977, a year after his death, his discovery of EPR was acknowledged by the international EPR society, which also established the "Zavoisky Award". In 1984, Kazan Physics Institute was named after Zavoisky.

Zavoisky received 46 nominations for the Nobel Prize between 1958 and 1974, of which 41 were in Physics and 5 in Chemistry.

The International Society for Magnetic Resonance in Medicine (ISMRM) awards the E. K. Zavoisky stipend to help researches residing in countries with R&D expenditure below US$250 per capita attend the annual meeting.

== Bibliography ==
- Boris I. Kochelaev (1995). The beginning of paramagnetic resonance. World Scientific. ISBN 981-02-2114-2.
