= Boris Kochelaev =

Soviet and Russian physicist (1934–2025)

- Борис Кочелаев
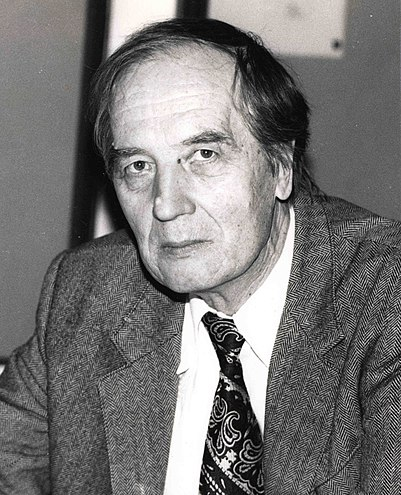
- Born: Boris Ivanovich Kochelaev; 19 April 1934; Dirizhablestroy, Moscow Oblast, Russian SFSR, Soviet Union
- Died: 29 September 2025 (aged 91)
- Education: Kazan Federal University
- Awards: Order of the Red Banner of Labour (1976); Order of Honour (2005)
- Scientific career
- Fields: Physics
- Workplaces: Kazan Federal University
- Doctoral advisor: Semen Altshuler

Boris Ivanovich Kochelaev (Russian: Бори́с Ива́нович Кочела́ев; 19 April 1934 – 29 September 2025) was a Soviet and Russian physicist and academic.

== Life and career ==
Kochelaev was born in Dirizhablestroy (now Dolgoprudny), Moscow Oblast, Russian SFSR, USSR on 19 April 1934. He graduated from the Physics and Mathematics Faculty of the Kazan University in 1957. From 1957 to 1960, Kochelaev was a post-graduate student of the Experimental and Theoretical Physics Department of Kazan University under the supervision of Semen Altshuler. He defended his candidate's (Ph.D.) dissertation in 1960 at Kharkov State University and his doctor's dissertation in 1968. From 1968, Boris Kochelaev has been a professor, and from 1973 to 2000, he was chair of Kazan University's Theoretical Physics Department.

He was the author of more than 150 scientific works. 33 PhD-level scientists were supervised by Kochelaev, ten of them have obtained doctoral degrees and become full professors.

Kochelaev died on 29 September 2025, at the age of 91.

== Research ==
The research interests are focused on electron spin resonance and spin dynamics in condensed matter, superconductivity, propagation of sound in resonant media, and light scattering in solids.

Major research achievements:

- The development of spin-phonon interactions in paramagnetic crystals:
- The non-linear theory of kinetic processes in paramagnetic crystals explained the experimentally observed phonon avalanche and super-scattering of light under saturation on the wing of the EPR line
- The prediction of the discovered later effect of non-resonant sound absorption and its giant amplification by radio-frequency fields
- The theory of EPR and spin relaxation in conventional superconductors with paramagnetic impurities
- The theory of spin kinetics and magnetic resonance in usual and high-T_{c} superconductors and Kondo systems with heavy fermions.

These last theoretical investigations are best described by Nobel Prize winner Prof. K. Alex Müller in the paper titled "The Impact of ESR (EPR) on the Understanding of Cuprates and Their Superconductivity":

this important advance was achieved by the experimental results at the universities of Darmstadt and Zürich on the one side and the deep theoretical insight of Boris Kochelaev at the Kazan State University explaining them on the other side.

== Honors and awards ==
- Medal "For the Development of Virgin Lands" (1958)
- Order of the Red Banner of Labour (1976)
- Medal "Veteran of Labour" (1983)
- Honored Worker of Science of TASSR (1984)
- Honored Worker of Science of Russian Federation (2000)
- Honored Professor of Kazan University (2004)
- Order of Honour (Russia) (2005)
- State Prize of the Republic of Tatarstan in the field of science and technology (2007)
- Order «For Merit to the Republic of Tatarstan» (2015)

== Sources ==
- Personal page of B.I.Kochelaev on the website of Kazan Federal University
