= Kazan Zoo =

Mixed garden in Kazan, Russia

Kazan Zoological and Botanical Garden
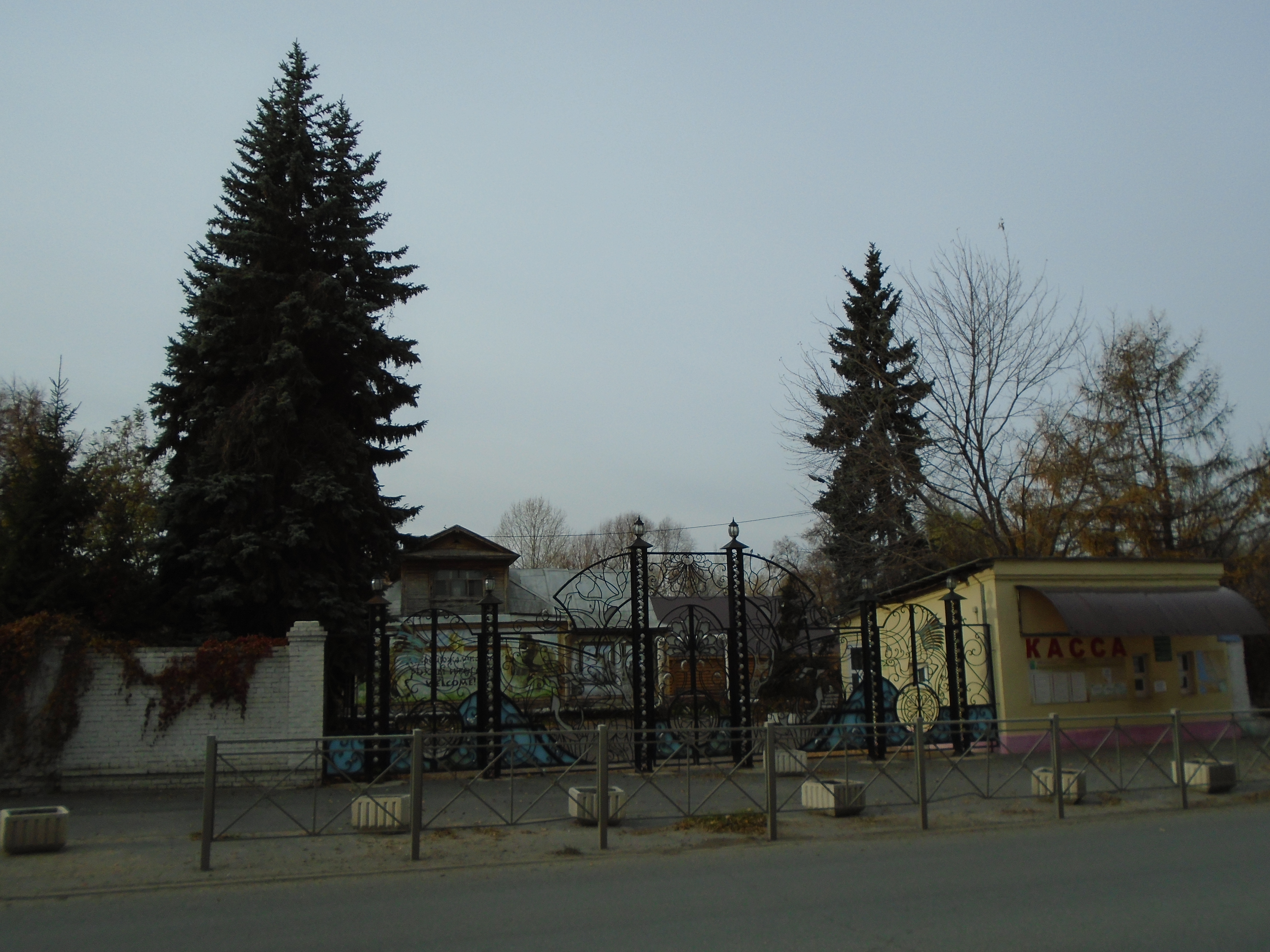
- Gate of Kazan Zoological and Botanical Garden
- Type: Zoological garden and Botanical garden
- Location: st. Ulitsa Khadi Taktasha, 112, Kazan, Russia
- Coordinates: 55.7663638°N 49.1325736°E
- Area: 40 acres
- Opened: 1806; 219 years ago
- Founder: Karl Fuchs
- Website: https://www.kazzoobotsad.ru/

The Kazan Zoological and Botanical Garden (Russian: Казанский зооботанический сад; Tatar: Казан зооботаник бакчасы, romanized: Qazan zoobotanik baqçası) sometimes called the Kazan Zoo, is a mixed garden in Kazan, Russia. It displays over 1,000 and 160 species of plants and animals, respectively. As of 2014, the garden was reconstructed and additional spaces were inserted. In 1996, the garden joined the European Association of Zoos and Aquaria.

== History ==
The Botanical Garden appeared in 1805. Initially, medicinal plants were grown in the garden. The garden was opened to visitors in 1834. In 1836 a greenhouse was erected.The zoo appeared on the territory in 1931.

== See also ==
- List of zoos by country#Russia
