= Tuvana-i-Ra =

Fijian Atoll in the Lau Islands

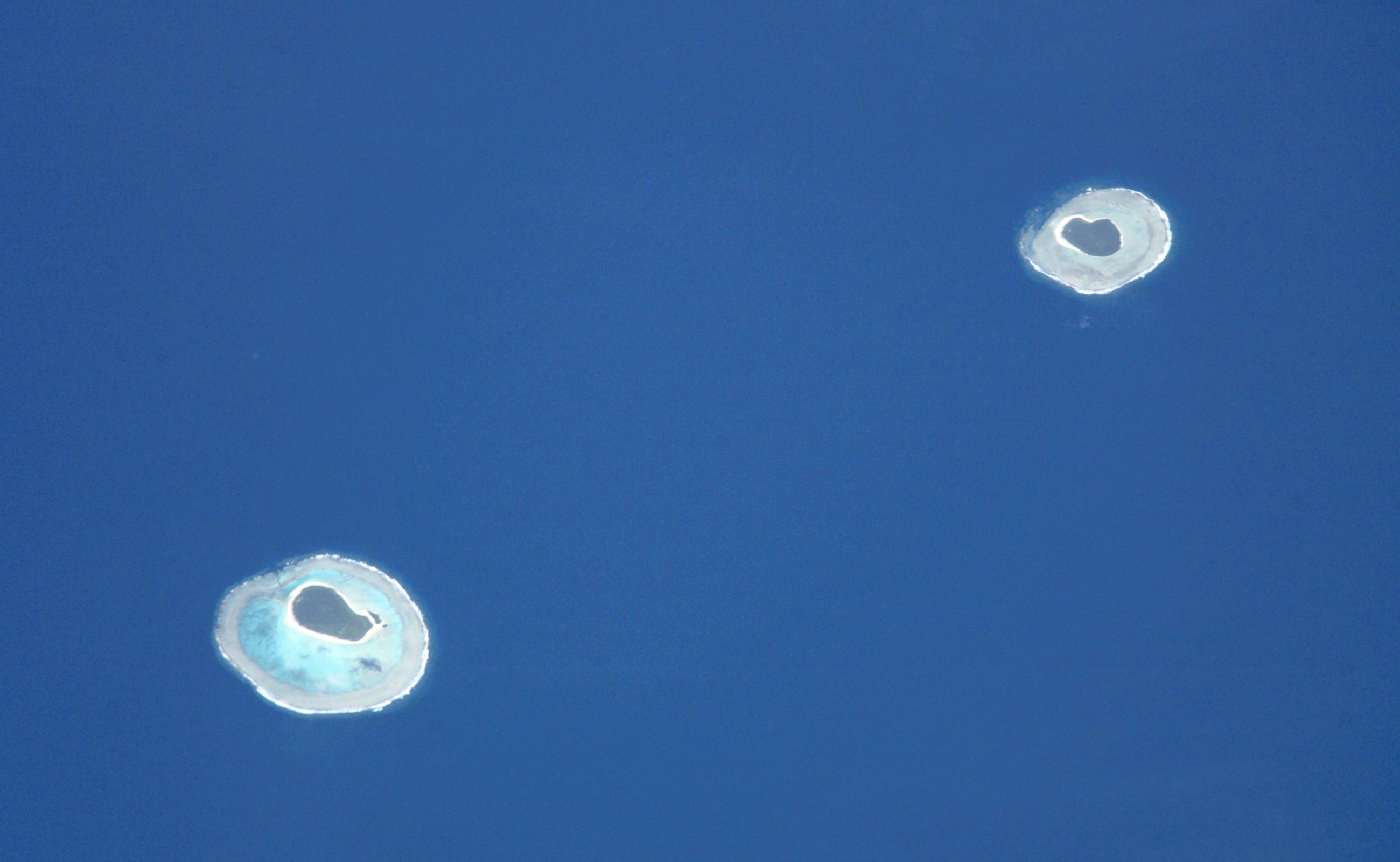
- Tuvana-i-Ra (left) and Tuvana-i-Colo (right)

- Location within Fiji

Geography
- Location: South Pacific Ocean
- Coordinates: 21°02′21″S 178°50′54″W
- Archipelago: Lau Islands
- Adjacent to: Koro Sea
- Total islands: 1
- Area: 4.5 km^{2} (1.7 sq mi)
- Length: 2.8 km (1.74 mi)
- Width: 2.3 km (1.43 mi)

Administration
- Fiji
- Division: Eastern
- Province: Lau
- Tikina: Ono

Demographics
- Population: 0

Tuvana-i-Ra is an uninhabited] atoll in the southeastern part of the island state of Fiji in the Pacific Ocean. It is the southernmost atoll of the Lau archipelago and represents Fiji's second-southernmost landmass; only the remote and uninhabited atoll Ceva-i-Ra lies slightly further south.

== History ==
The island was sighted in 1820 by the Russian explorer Fabian Gottlieb von Bellingshausen and named "Mikhailov” (after the artist Pavel Mikhailov who was on expedition with him).

In 2017, four New Zealanders were shipwrecked on a remote reef before managing to sail to Tuvana-i-Ra. The island's four residents provided the shipwrecked New Zealanders food and shelter, before they managed to sail to Suva.

== Geography ==
Tuvana-i-Ra is located about 30 km southwest of Ono-i-Lau, Fiji's southernmost inhabited atoll, and 8 km southwest of the neighboring Tuvana-i-Colo. It is an elliptically shaped Atoll with a large island in the center of the lagoon. There are no islands on the fringing reef.

== See also ==
- Desert island
- List of islands
