= Tuvana-i-Colo =

Fijian Atoll in Lau Islands

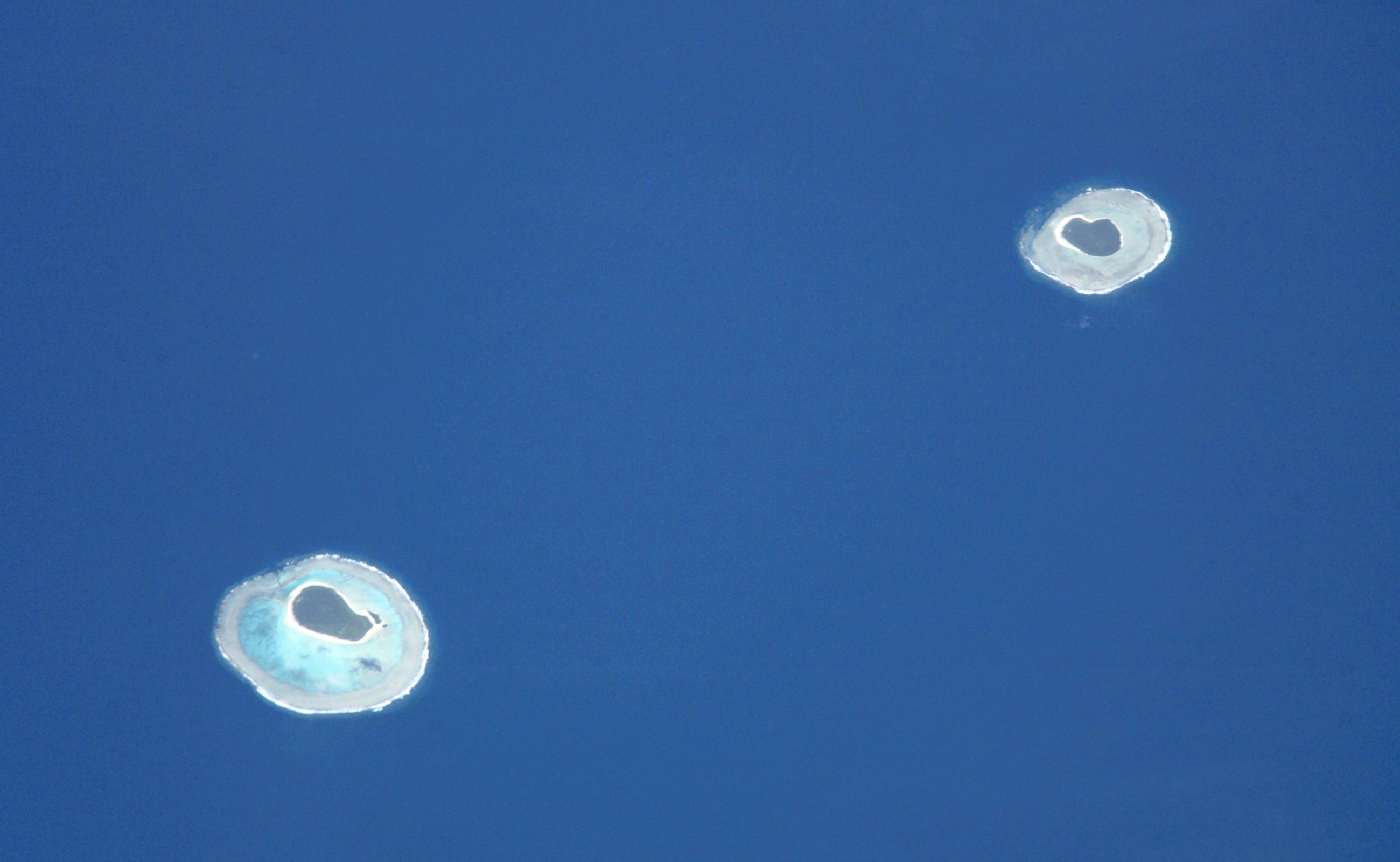
- Tuvana-i-Ra (left) and Tuvana-i-Colo (right)

- Location within Fiji

Geography
- Location: South Pacific Ocean
- Coordinates: 21°00′45″S 178°45′00″W
- Archipelago: Lau Islands
- Adjacent to: Koro Sea
- Total islands: 1
- Area: 2.25 km^{2} (0.87 sq mi)
- Length: 1.7 km (1.06 mi)
- Width: 1.65 km (1.025 mi)

Administration
- Fiji
- Division: Eastern
- Province: Lau
- Tikina: Ono

Demographics
- Population: 0

Tuvana-i-Colo is a small island in the southeastern part of the island state of Fiji in the Pacific Ocean. It has three structures visible on satellite imagery, but it is unknown whether the island is inhabited. It is the second most southern atoll of the Lau archipelago and represents Fiji's third most southern landmass. It is located about 25 km south of Ono-i-Lau, the southernmost inhabited Fijian atoll, and 8 kilometres east-northeast of the neighboring atoll Tuvana-i-Ra. It is completely surrounded by a fringing reef.

== History ==
The island was sighted in 1820 by the Russian explorer Fabian Gottlieb von Bellingshausen and named "Siminov” (after the astronomer Ivan Mikhailovich Simonov who was on expedition with him).

== See also ==
- Desert island
- List of islands
