= Ivan Mikhailovich Simonov =

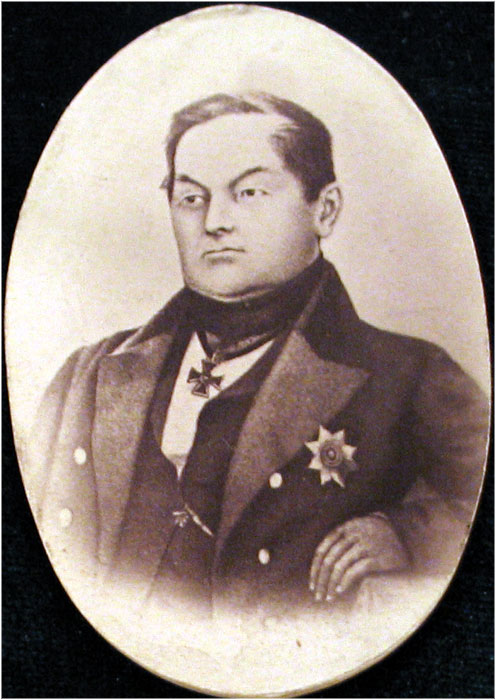
- I. M. Simonov — rector of Kazan University (Daguerreotype, about 1850 y.)
- Born: June 20 (July 1) 1794; Astrakhan, Russian Empire
- Died: January 10 (January 22) 1855; Kazan
- Citizenship: Kazan
- Known for: Discovering Antarctica
- Scientific career
- Fields: Astronomy
- Workplaces: Kazan State University

Ivan Mikhailovich Simonov (1794–1855) was a Russian astronomer and a geodesist.

== Biography ==
He completed his studies and became a professor of physics at Kazan State University in 1816 where he was a close friend of Nikolai Lobachevsky. He was a corresponding member of the Saint Petersburg Academy of Sciences from 1829 and later went on to become the rector of Kazan State University in 1846.

From 1819 to 1821 he took part in and wrote a detailed account of Fabian Bellingshausen and Mikhail Lazarev's expedition around the world, during which the continent of Antarctica was discovered.

Among Simonov's contributions are his many astronomical observations, the development of methods for such observations, and the design of a reflector. Simonov was among the first in Russia to study terrestrial magnetism. On his initiative two observatories were established in Kazan: an astronomical observatory in 1833 and an observatory for the study of magnetism in 1843. Simonov Island (Tuvana-I-Tholo) in the South Pacific and the northeastern cape of Peter I Island were named in Simonov's honor.

== Early life ==
He was born in Astrakhan city into a noble family on 20 June 1794. In 1808, Simonov studied in Astrakhan, province gymnasium, then entered the Kazan gymnasium. In 1809, he started studying at Imperial Kazan University. After graduated in 1810, Simonov passed the exam for scientific bachelor's degree by physical and mathematical science. The World Trip In 1819 with offer from Science Academy Simonov was assigned astronomer at The World Trip in southern hemisphere with the ships “Vostok” and “Mirniy”. This expedition is claimed to be the first time the shelf ice of the south polar continent in Antarctica has been discovered.

Simonov is the first Russian astronomer who have ventured into Antarctica. He make the first observations of stars in the southern hemisphere of the sky, what was not able to discover in Russia. Moreover, he was single scientist in this mission. In addition to astronomic observations and detection geographical coordinates, he was conducting magnetic observations and for the first time claimed South magnetic pole of the Earth is located at 76° South and 142.5° West (since then, its position has changed significantly due to the age-old displacement of the magnetic poles).

== Work ==
After return to Kazan in 1822, he was confirmed as an ordinary Professor of astronomy. In 1822-1823 and 1825-1830-Dean of the faculty of physics and mathematics of Kazan University. In 1828, he toured a significant part of the Kazan province and part of Simbirsk and Orenburg, where by astronomical observations he established the exact geographical coordinates of many cities, and with the help of a barometer he determined at what height the places he visited were located. At the initiative of I. M. Simonov, two observatories were founded in Kazan — the astronomical one, of which he was Director in 1838–1855, and the magnetic one (1843).

== Memory ==
- Simonov's island in the Pacific Ocean, the southernmost in the Lau island group (Fiji); its local name is Tuvana-i-Colo.
- Simonov glacier (Norv. Simonovbreen) on the Antarctic island of Peter the Great.
- Simonov was buried in the Kizichesky cemetery in Kazan, which was destroyed during the Soviet Union period. In 2010, a memorial stone was installed in the Kizichesky monastery at the supposed burial place of I. M. Simonov
