= Kazan Federal University =

Public university in Kazan, Russia

- Казанский (Приволжский) федеральный университет
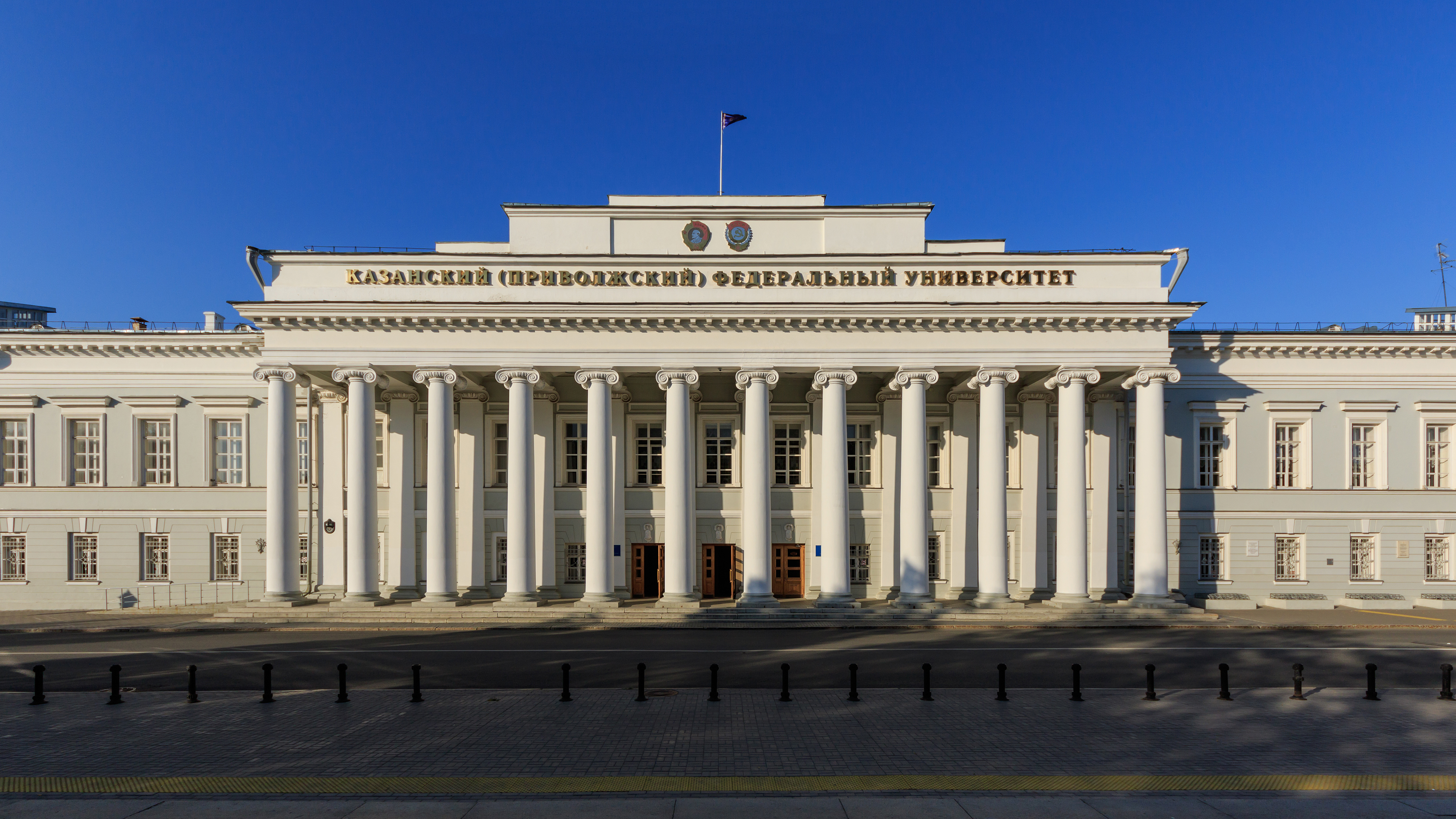
- Latin: Universitas Casanensis
- Former names: Vladimir Ulyanov-Lenin Kazan State University, Imperial Kazan University
- Type: Public/Federal university
- Established: November 17, 1804; 221 years ago
- Affiliations: EUA; IAU; EURAS; AMBA
- Rector: Lenar Safin
- Academic staff: ~ 4400
- Students: ~ 50200
- Location: 18 Ulitsa Kremlevskaya, Kazan, Tatarstan, Russia; 55°47′27″N 49°07′19″E
- Campus: Both urban and suburban
- Language: Russian, English, Tatar
- Colours: Blue and white
- Website: Official website (in Russian)

Kazan Federal University (Russian: Казанский (Приволжский) федеральный университет; Tatar: Казан (Идел буе) федераль университеты, romanized: Qazan (İdel buyı) federal universitetı) is a public research university located in Kazan, Russia.

The university was founded in 1804 as Imperial Kazan University, which makes it the second oldest continuously existing tertiary education institution in Russia. Founder of non-Euclidean geometry Nikolai Ivanovich Lobachevsky served there as the rector from 1827 until 1846. In 1925, the university was renamed in honour of its student Vladimir Ilyich Ulyanov (Lenin). The university is known as the birthplace of organic chemistry due to works by Aleksandr Butlerov, Vladimir Markovnikov, Aleksandr Arbuzov, and the birthplace of electron spin resonance discovered by Evgeny Zavoisky.

In 2011, Kazan University received a federal status. It is also one of 18 Russian universities that were initially selected to participate in the Project 5-100, coordinated by the Government of the Russian Federation and aimed to improve their international competitiveness among the world's leading research and educational centers. In 2021, KFU joined Priority 2030, Russia's new academic excellence project.

As of early 2023, the university comprised 20 primary educational units, 3 of which were territorial branches, including one branch in Uzbekistan. More than 52,000 students were enrolled in over 600 degree programs at undergraduate and postgraduate level (including doctoral and double-degree programs with partner universities); the number of international students was about 11,500 from 101 countries. Current research priorities are biomedicine, materials science, hydrocarbon industry, new energy sources, IT and cyber-physical systems, and comprehensive development of human potential.

== History ==
Among the subjects of pride are the creation of non-Euclidean geometry by Nikolai Lobachevsky, the discovery of the chemical element Ruthenium by Karl Ernst Claus, the theory of chemical structure of organic compounds by Aleksandr Butlerov, the discovery of electron paramagnetic resonance by Yevgeny Zavoisky and acoustic paramagnetic resonance by Semen Altshuler, the development of organophosphorus chemical compounds by Alexander and Boris Arbuzovs.

Among the university students and alumni there are the founder of the Soviet Union Vladimir Lenin, writers Sergei Aksakov, Leo Tolstoy, Pavel Melnikov-Pechersky, Velimir Khlebnikov, composer Mily Balakirev, and painter Valery Yakobi.

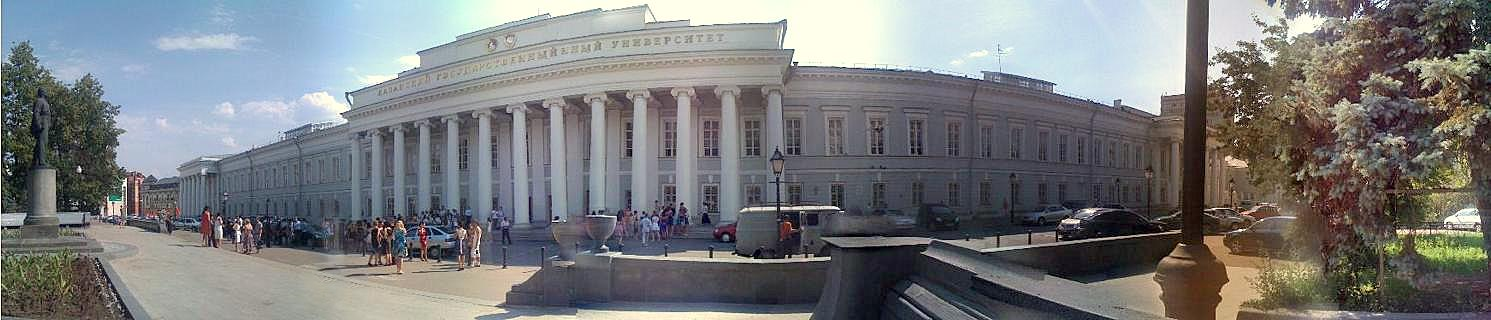
Panorama of Kazan State University's main building

=== Imperial period ===
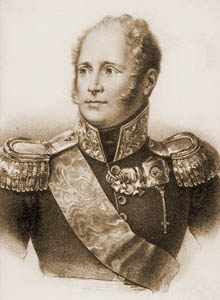
Russian Emperor Alexander I is credited with the university's foundation.

Kazan University was founded on November 17, 1804, when Emperor Alexander I signed the Affirmative Letter and the Charter about the creation of the Kazan Imperial University. The first students, enrolled in 1805, were graduates of the First Kazan Gymnasium – an autonomous affiliate of Moscow State University, under whose auspices Kazan University first operated. It was not until 1814 that the university underwent its full opening. It was restructured as a classical university comprising four departments: moral and political sciences, physical and mathematical sciences, medical sciences and philology. Before Tomsk University was founded, the University of Kazan used to be the easternmost university in the Russian Empire, it was thus serving for Volga, Kama, and Ural regions, Siberia and the Caucasus.

In 1819, M. L. Magnitsky conducted a review of the university, in which he reported on 'the spirit of dissent and irreligion' that he had observed at the university. In his report to the Emperor, he spoke of the "public destruction" of the university and demanded it be closed, but Alexander I put the resolved 'why destroy what can be corrected'. Magnitsky was consequently appointed trustee of the Kazan school district, an action that negatively affected the university, with many professors being dismissed and 'harmful' books withdrawn from the library's collection. In addition, a strict barrack domestic regime was introduced for students of the university.

In 1819–1821 an alumnus and scholar of Kazan University Ivan Simonov participated in the discovery of Antarctica during the first round-the-world expedition and pioneered Antarctic studies.

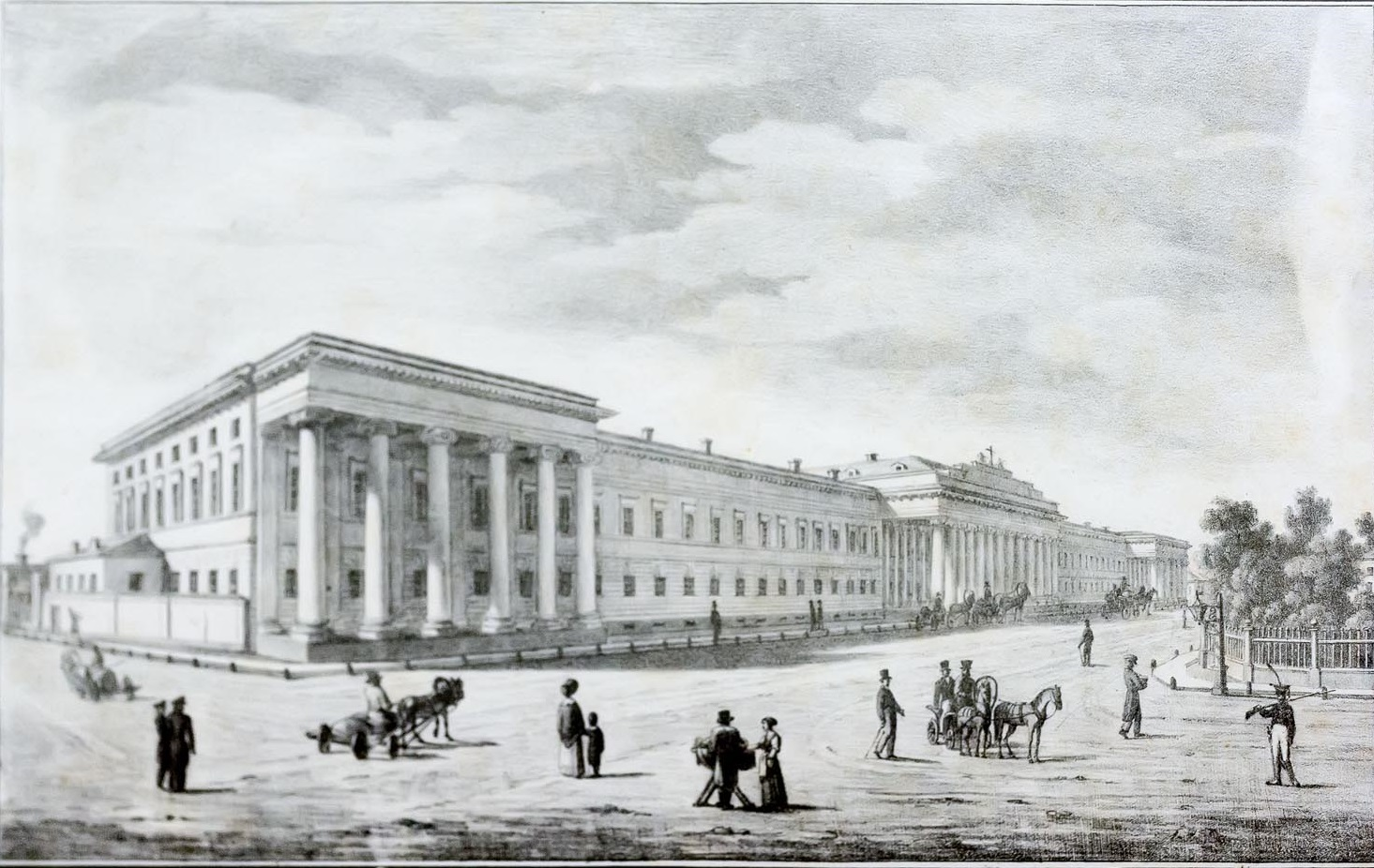
Kazan University in the early 1830s.

In 1825, the Main Building of the university was built and, in 1830, the Main Campus was completed. This included the Library Building, Chemical Laboratory, dissection facilities, astronomical observatory, and clinics. It was the scientific faculties that were, at this time, organised into a number of research schools: mathematical, chemical, medical, geological.

In 1834, the journal Proceedings of Kazan University began to be published by academicians of the university and in 1835 Nicholas I ordered to establish three faculties: Philosophical (which was further subdivided into verbal and physical-mathematical departments), Faculty of Law and Faculty of Medicine.

In 1844, Karl Klaus, a professor at the university, discovered, and named in honour of Russia, Ruthenium, the only chemical element discovered in Tsarist Russia. Six years thereafter St. Petersburg University opened the Institute of Oriental Studies and all training materials and collections of Kazan University in this field were transferred to the capital of Imperial Russia. Shortly after that, there was a further reform of the university's structure, when in 1863, by the order of Alexander II, the university was reorganised into four departments: History and Philology, Physics and Mathematics, Law, and Medicine. A linguistic school was forming at the university during 1875–1883.

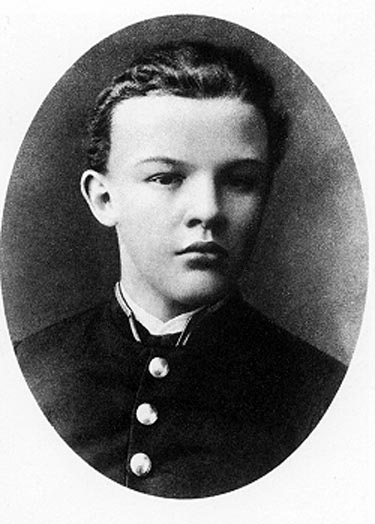
Lenin as he appeared in 1887.

Around that time Vladimir Ilyich Ulyanov (Lenin), a future leader of the Soviet Union, studied law at the university from August 1887 until his expulsion due to 'student disturbances' in December 1887.

The university faced one of its greatest challenges during the Russian Civil War, when in August–September 1918 the siege and ultimate capture of Kazan by the Red Army and Czechoslovak Corps led to a large exodus of students and faculty members from the city. Subsequently, many of them were enrolled in state universities in Siberia and help they provided proved instrumental in the foundation of universities in Tomsk and Irkutsk.

==== Kazan Higher Women's Courses ====
Though approval was given in the Imperial period for Women to audit university lectures from 1859, the Higher Courses were not state funded and required local support, carrying high tuition fees. When petitioned by the university to create courses for women, Dmitry Tolstoy suggested that a curriculum modeled on the Guerrier Courses might be acceptable, though he continuously blocked their implementation in Kazan. In 1876, the imperial government, hoping to secure more qualified teachers, authorized creation of Higher Women's Courses in all cities in the empire which had a university. From October 1876, female applicants who had completed a girls' gymnasium; were certified instructors in arithmetic, history and Russian language; or passed an entrance examination could enroll in evening classes at Kazan University. Those who did not meet those requirements could attend as external auditors, but were excluded from course examinations. Students took six mandatory courses in art history, physics, Russian history and literature, and world history and literature. Optional courses included hygiene, languages, and mathematics.

In 1879, the founder of the Kazan Higher Women's Courses, N. V. Sorokin, expanded the offerings to include two specializations: "historical-philological and physico-mathematical". This opened up additional course offerings including algebra and geometry, chemistry, English language, German literature, geography, history of philosophy, history of physical and mathematical sciences, history of physics, and natural sciences. In 1881, aesthetics was added and in 1884, Latin began being offered as an elective class. The courses allowed women to access higher education for a decade before being permanently closed in 1886. In 1904, professors of the university formed a committee to reinstate the women's courses, but the plan was rejected because of it was economically not feasible. The plan was refused again in 1905, but in 1906, after the Revolution, authorities allowed the university to reinstate the Higher Women's Courses of the historical-philological department. The first Latvian to earn a degree in Folkloric Studies, Anna Bērzkalne, graduated as a Candidate of Philology from the Kazan Higher Women's Courses in 1917.

=== Soviet period ===
In accordance with a directive from the Council of People's Commissars issued on October 9, 1918, the system of academic ranks was abolished and all university-level lecturers with at least three years of teaching experience were qualifying for the title of professor. This allowed the University of Kazan, which had lost the vast majority of its academic staff during the turmoil of the civil war, to restart proper education and research.

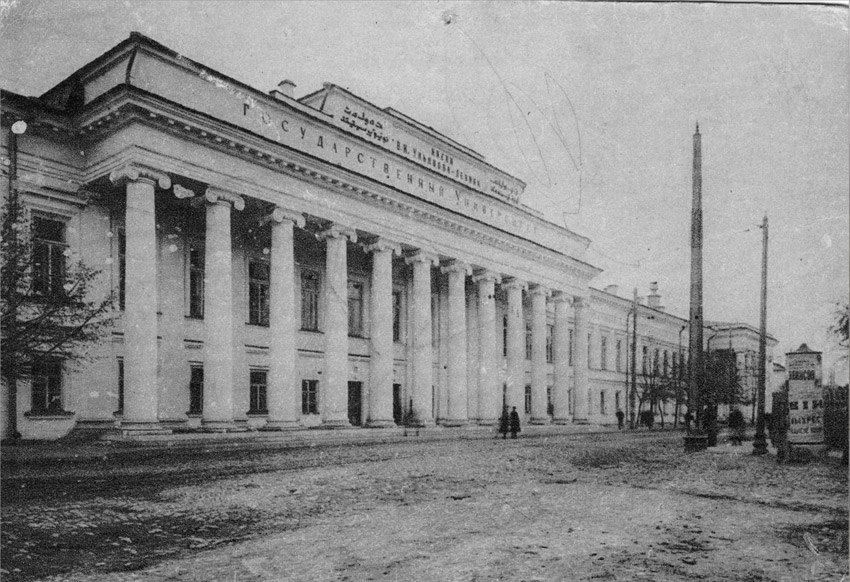
The university's name appeared in Arabic-script Tatar on the main building before that script's abolition in 1928.

The university opened a 'workers' faculty (fifth in the RSFSR), which aimed to provide the education for peasants. On 1 November 1919 peasant workers started their first classes without the requirement to pass an entrance exam. In 1922 the university's Faculty of Forestry merged with the Faculty of Agriculture of Kazan Polytechnic university to form Kazan Institute of Agriculture and Forestry.

In 1925 by the decision of All-Russian Central Executive Committee Kazan State University was renamed to the V. I. Ulyanov-Lenin Kazan State University. This was done in order to recognise the period of time Vladimir Lenin spent as a student at the University of Kazan.

In the 1930s the university continued to evolve with a number of its faculties being separated from it in order to become independent institutions of higher education. Some of them continue their existence, for instance Kazan State Medical University. Moreover, during the World War II years (1941–43) a number of members of the Soviet Academy of Sciences were evacuated from Moscow and Leningrad and housed under the premises of the university; this, in turn, led to the foundation of Kazan Department of the academy in 1945.

In the post-war years the University of Kazan underwent a period of expansion and development of its academic base. To recognize the work in providing education to the peoples of the Soviet Union Kazan State University was awarded the Order of the Red Banner of Labour in 1953 and later, in 1979, the Order of Lenin. In the 1970s the university's two high-rise academic buildings were built – the Department of Physics in 1973 and Faculty of Mathematics in 1978. The final major Soviet-era change to the university came with the opening of UNICS Sports Center and Concert Hall in 1989.

=== 21st century ===
On October 21, 2009, Russian President Dmitry Medvedev signed a presidential decree that established a new Volga Federal University on the basis of Kazan State University. The federal university project is realized on the basis of Kazan State University, with the accession of the Tatar State University of Humanities and Education (TGGPU), Kazan State Finance and Economics Institute (KGFEI), Elabuga State Pedagogical University and Naberezhnye Chelny Academy of Engineering and Economy. The university's first rector is Ilshat Gafurov, formerly the mayor of Elabuga. The current president is Myakzyum Salakhov.

In 2013 Kazan Federal University launched the Programme for enhancing its competitive ranking among leading world centres of higher education and research (2013–20) in the framework of implementation of the Government Resolution No. 211 «On measures of federal support for the leading universities of the Russian Federation in order to enhance their competitiveness among the leading world scientific and educational centers» (signed on 16 March 2013).

Dmitry Albertovich Tayursky, Rector of the university, was suspended by the European University Association (EUA) following support for the 2022 Russian invasion of Ukraine by the Russian Union of Rectors (RUR) in March 2022, for being "diametrically opposed to the European values that they committed to when joining EUA".

== Rankings and reputation ==
University rankings

Global – Overall
- QS World: =450 (2026)
- THE World: 801–1000
- USNWR Global: =1105

National – Overall
- Interfax National: 10

After having obtained the status of a federal university, KFU tasked itself with advancing in the global rankings race. This is also the primary metric for the participants of the Project 5-100, a national initiative to boost the competitiveness of the top Russian universities, which Kazan University joined in 2013. The new academic excellence project for Russian universities, Priority 2030, of which KFU is part, does not have rankings advancement among its stated objectives.

The university has been ranked by QS World University Rankings since 2012, steadily climbing from 601+ to 322nd place. It also had 5+ stars in QS Stars Ratings, the only university in Russia to have been so ranked as of November 2020.

KFU first appeared in Academic Ranking of World Universities in 2018 and was ranked 801 – 900 in that year and in 2019.

The university is present in multiple subject areas in QS subject rankings and Times Higher Education subject rankings.

== Campus ==
Kazan Federal University's Main Campus is located in downtown Kazan, 10 minutes away by foot from the Kazan Kremlin. The Main Building of Kazan University was designed by architect Petr Pyatnitsky and built in the 1820s. The oldest part of the today's Main Building includes three classic portals along with the white foreside of the original 1822 construction. From 1832 to 1841, architect M. Korinfsky designed the rest of the buildings comprising the neo-classical Architectural Complex of Kazan University. The Main Building Yard now contains the central administrative offices, the Anatomical Theatre, the Library, chemistry and physics laboratories, and the Observatory.

Chemical Faculty Building (since 2003: Alexander Butlerov Chemistry Institute) was built in 1953 with the support of students. The original building was built in the Soviet neoclassical style. In 1960-70s, two high-rise academic buildings were erected to the north and to the west of the Main Building. The most recent addition was in 2015, when a 7-storey laboratory building was added to the campus.

By President Boris Yeltsin's Decree in 1996, the Architectural Complex of Kazan University was added to the National Cultural Heritage Register of Russia. During the preparations for 200th anniversary of KFU the East Wing was added to the Main Building and today along with the university administration, the Museum of History of Kazan University, Yevgeny Zavoisky Lab-Museum, the Botanical Museum, Edward Eversman Zoology Museum, and two academic units – the Institute of Fundamental Medicine and Biology together with the Faculty of Law reside there. University sport facilities include UNICS and Bustan Sports Centers built in 1989 and 2010.

KFU dormitory campus is located in the Universiade Village, built to accommodate participants of the XXVII World Summer Universiade 2013. Altogether, the premises of Kazan University are located throughout Russia in Tatarstan, Karachay-Cherkessia, Karelia, Mari El, and some other provinces and in other countries. The university is a co-user of the RTT-150 telescope at the TÜBİTAK National Observatory in Turkey.

Buildings of Kazan Federal University

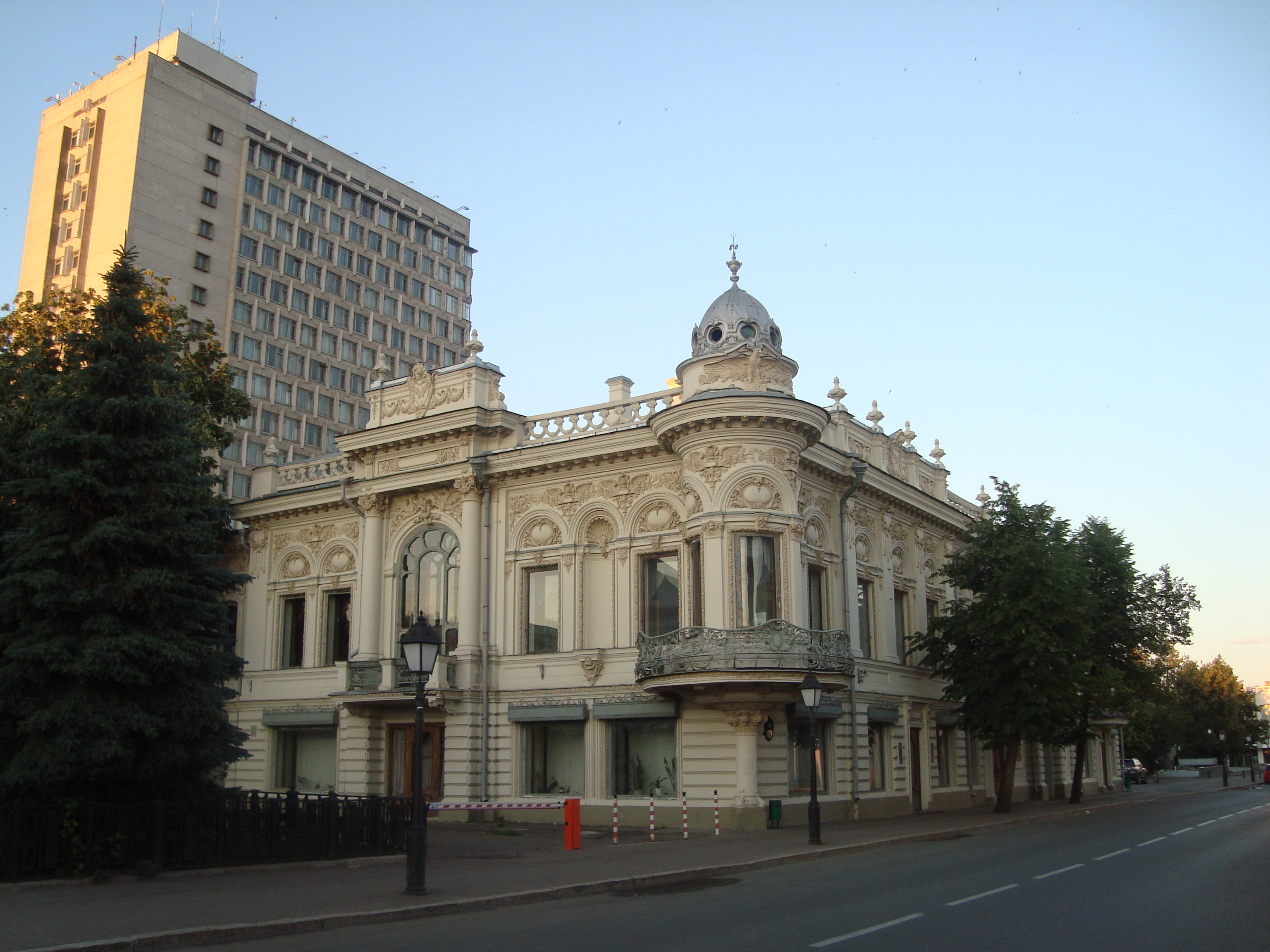
KFU 2nd Building and Tatar State Library

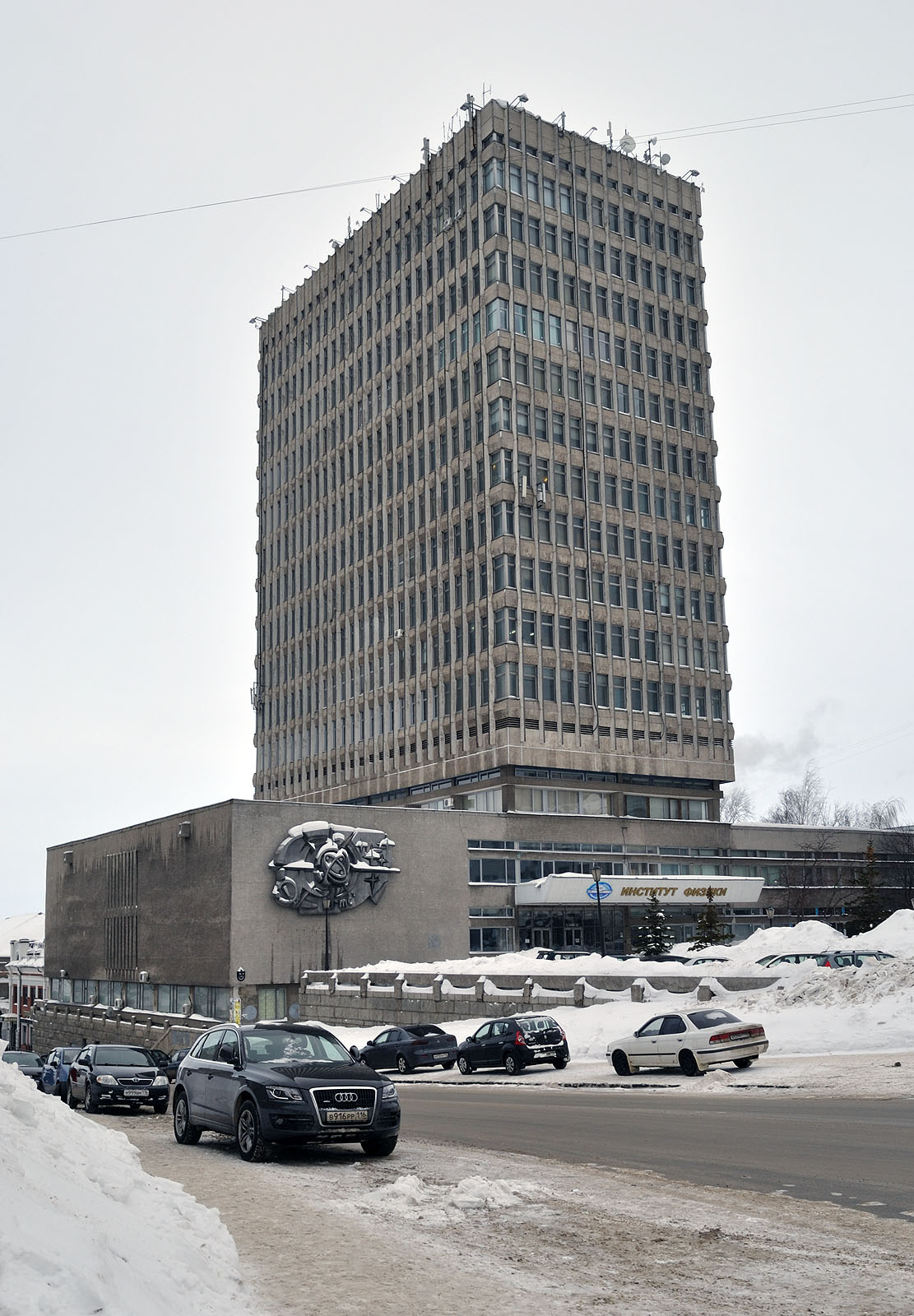
Institute of Physics

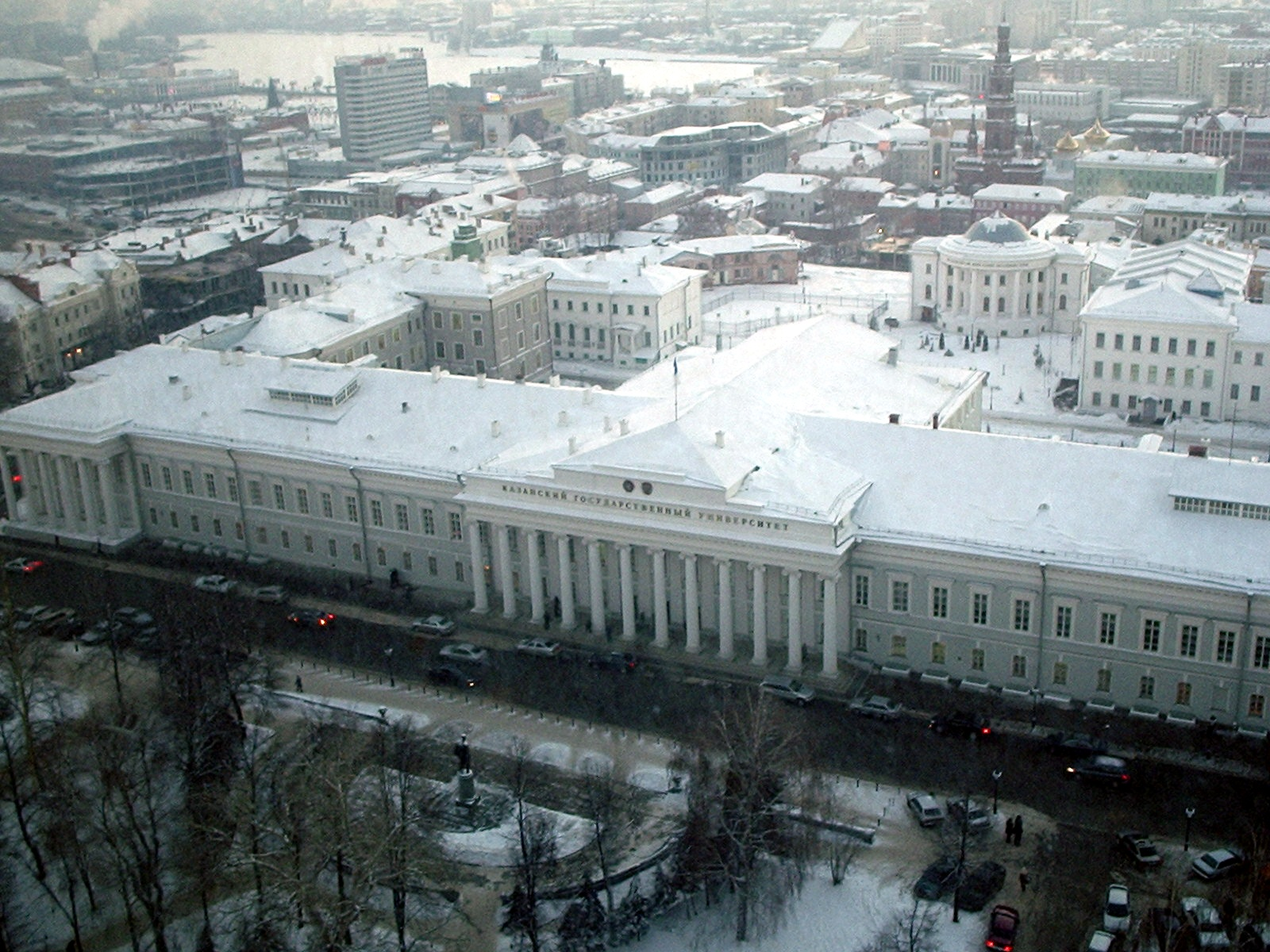
Main Building

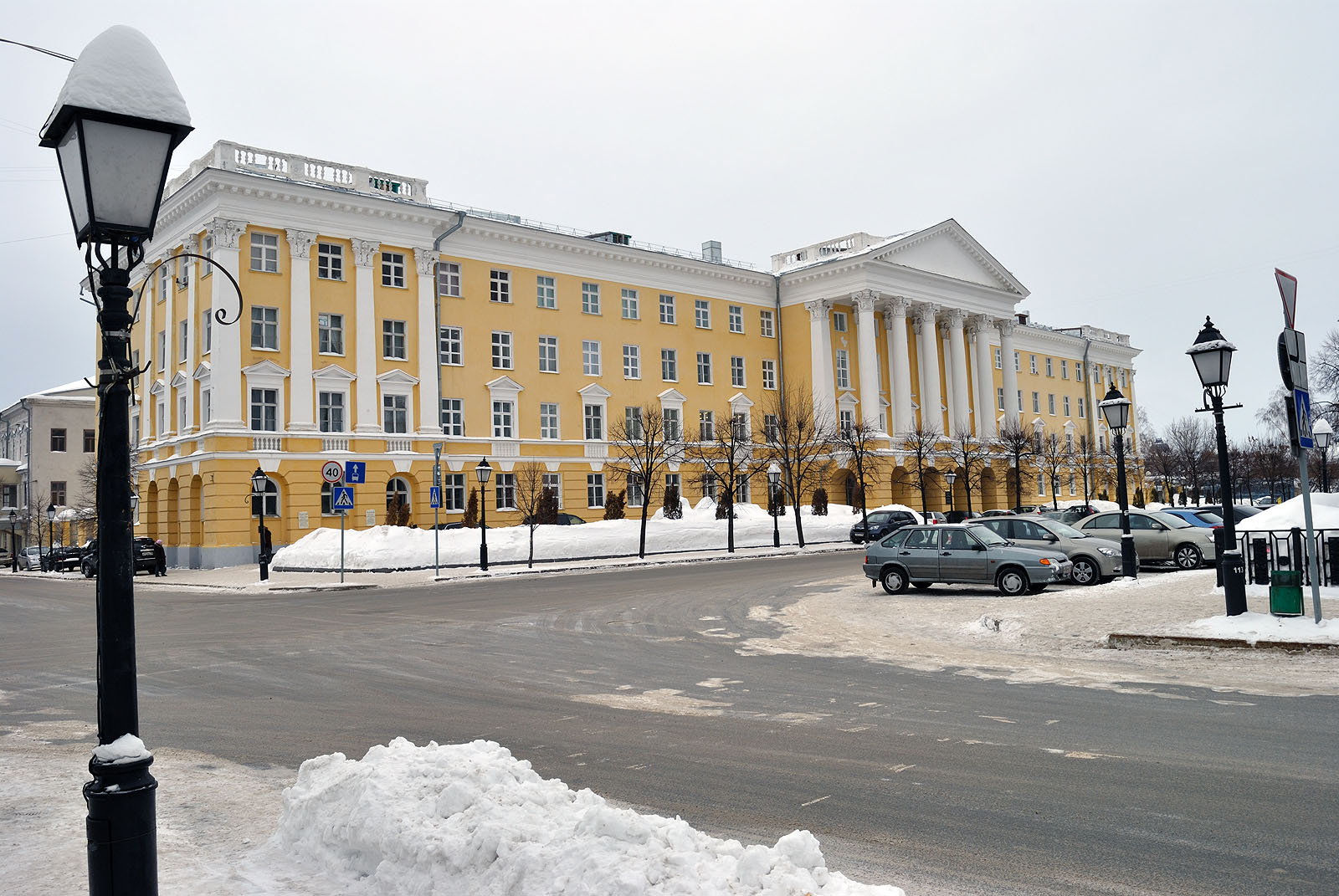
Alexander Butlerov Institute of Chemistry

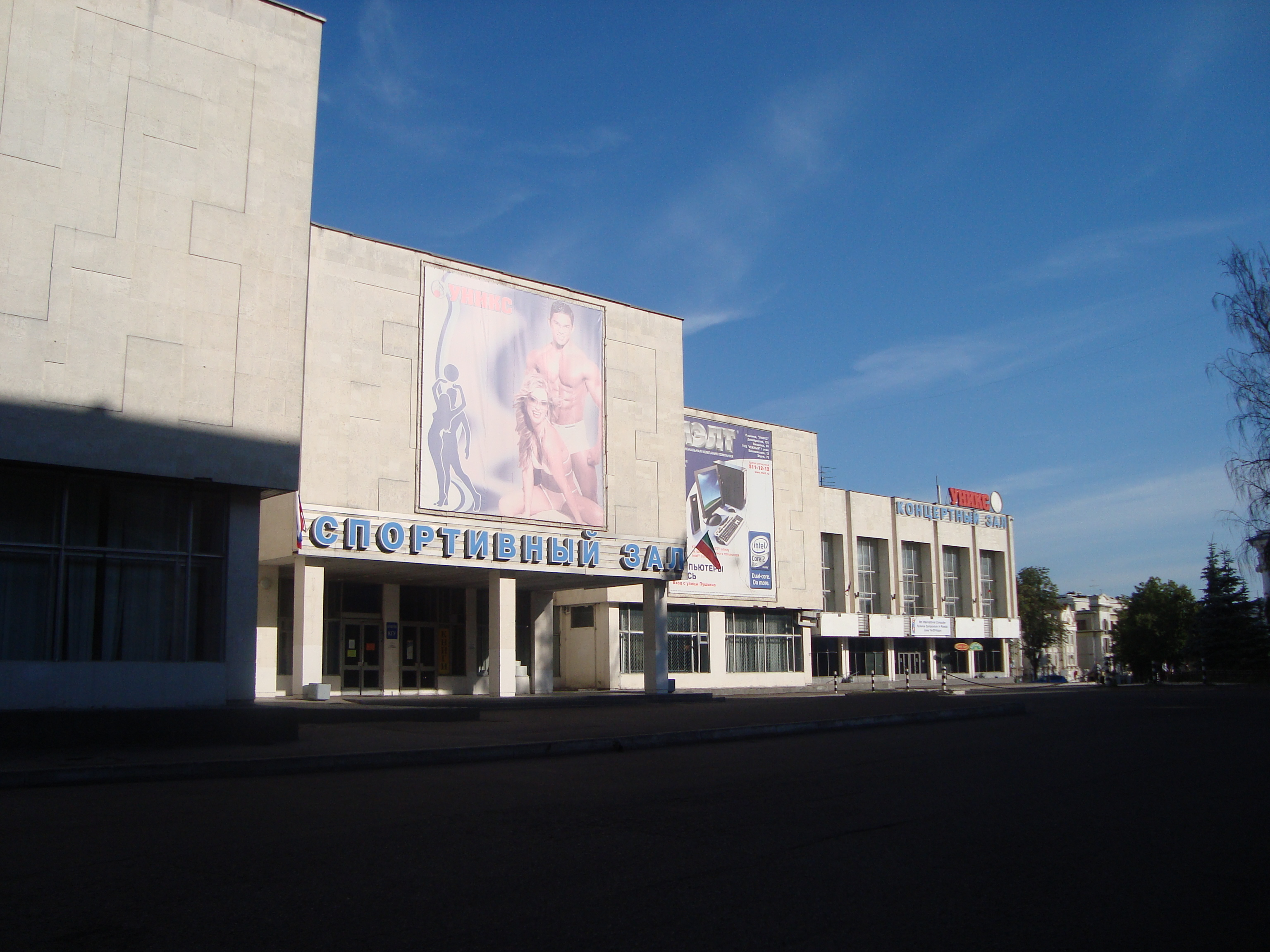
UNICS Sports Center and Concert Hall

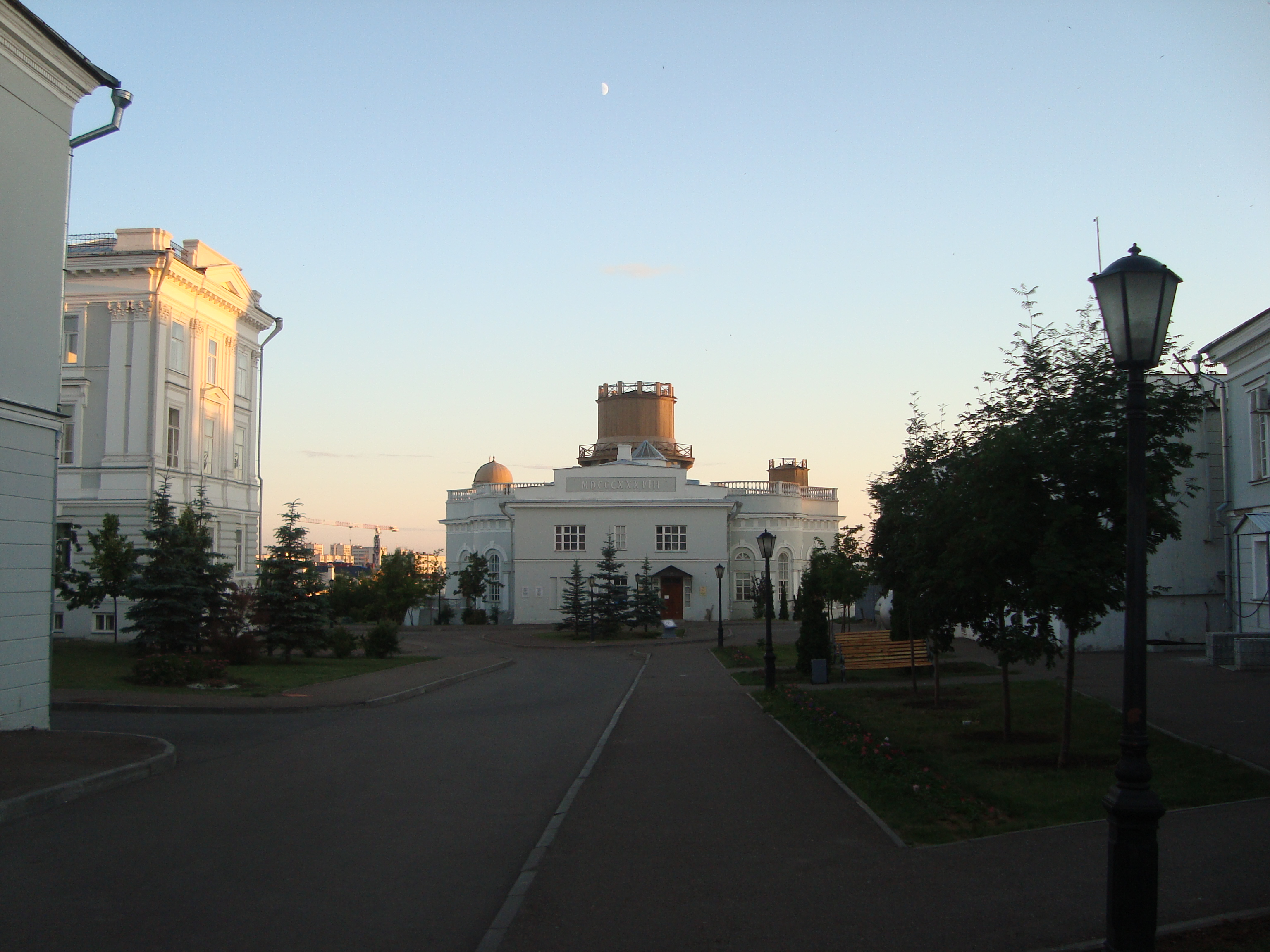
Kazan University Observatory

== Organization ==
The main campus of Kazan Federal University is located in Kazan and is divided into 15 institutes, 1 faculty and 1 higher school. The university also has three branches in Naberezhnye Chelny, Yelabuga, and Jizzakh, which all offer a variety of majors. A separate entity, Higher School of Public Administration, is also a part of the university but does not offer courses in tertiary education, as its sole purpose is to provide short-term advanced training to public servants. The university offers the majority of its programs in Russian. Prospective students may opt to enroll in KFU's Preparatory School to learn Russian or English, depending on their chosen program. English programs are offered in several specializations, including a full six-year MBBS course and a four-year international business course.

Physics, mathematics and IT

- Institute of Physics
- N.I. Lobachevsky Institute of Mathematics and Mechanics
- Institute of Computational Mathematics and Information Technologies
- Institute of Information Technologies and Intelligent Systems
- Institute of Engineering

Natural Sciences

- Institute of Geology and Petroleum Technologies
- Institute of Fundamental Medicine and Biology
- Institute of Environmental Sciences
- Alexander Butlerov Institute of Chemistry

Humanities

- Institute of Philology and Intercultural Communication
- Institute of Social and Philosophical Sciences and Mass Communications
- Institute of International Relations
- Institute of Psychology and Education
- Faculty of Law
- Institute of Design and Spatial Arts

Economics and public administration

- Institute of Management, Economics and Finance
- Higher School of Business

There are also several independent academic units which do not award higher education degrees, such as Department of Physical Education and Sports, Faculty of Advanced Training and Staff Retraining, Higher School of Public Administration, and some others.

== Global cooperation ==
The foundation of Kazan University was directly linked to international academia. Some of the university's first teachers were German professors such as Johann Bartels, Franz Erdman and Christian Fren. The German professor Karl Fuchs, who was both the founder of Kazan Medical School and the first European researcher of Tatar history and culture, became the university's rector in the 1820s and was awarded the title of Honourable Citizen of Kazan.

KFU has partnership agreements with approximately 190 universities and research centres from more than 53 countries. Through its cooperation with long-term partners such as Justus-Liebig University of Giessen (Germany), the Superior Institute of Materials and Advance Mechanics (ISMANS, France), Research Institute RIKEN (Japan) and others, KFU has participated in various research programmes and implemented double diploma programmes and cotutelle agreements.

In the 2015–2016 academic year, about 3000 international students were studying in KFU on different academic programmes.

Each year, more than 900 students and faculty members of KFU visited foreign universities and research centres for various purposes, including international conferences. About 1500 specialists from abroad were involved in various scientific events, development and introduction of new courses, research collaboration and other international activity at KFU. Native speaking specialists teach Chinese, Korean, Farsi, German, Spanish, English and other foreign languages on a regular basis at KFU. In October 2016, KFU and the Southwest Petroleum University entered into a cooperation agreement at Karamay. Among the honorary doctors and professors of KFU there are Vladimir Minkin, Alexei Starobinsky, Ichak Kalderon Adizes, Rashid Sunyaev, Anatole Abragam, Karl Alexander Müller, Brebis Bleaney, Ryoji Noyori, Mikhail Piotrovsky, Vitaly Ginzburg, and other scientists and Nobel prizers.

Every year KFU academic staff carried out on average 40 joint international projects and got individual support for research and study from DAAD, DFG, Volkswagen Foundation, NSF, European Commission (Tempus, FP7, Marie-Curie Actions, Erasmus-Mundus, etc.) and other grant making organizations.

KFU carry out several big projects on Mega-grants received from the Russian Government in the framework of Resolution No.220 of the Government of the Russian Federation "On measures designed to attract the world’s leading scientists to Russian institutions of higher learning, research organizations of the governmental academies of sciences, and governmental research centers of the Russian Federation" and Resolution No 218 of the Government of the Russian Federation "On promoting cooperation between higher educational institutions and organizations implementing comprehensive high-technology production":

- International research laboratory "Neurobiology. Early activity in the developing brain." The project is implemented jointly with the Institut national de la sante et de la recherche medicale (INSERM) (France);
- Joint project of KFU and «Nizhnekamskneftekhim»: "Increasing effectiveness for obtaining monomers of synthetic rubber by development and distribution of advanced catalysts of isoamylene dehydration".
- Joint project of KFU and TNG Group: «Development of innovative technologies and industrial management of equipment and software for effective investigation of resources for the purpose of identification of hydrocarbon deposits and supervision of their development».
- Joint project of KFU and "Tasma" Co.: "Development and Production of competitive photorecording materials".

Starting from 2011 Kazan University implements a large-scale project "Pharma 2020" financed within Federal Target Program of Russian Federation "Development of pharmaceutical and medical industry till 2020 and following perspectives" (Pharma-2020). Research and Education Center of Pharmaceutics was established providing interdisciplinary research for development and production of drugs.

The university administration and faculty have paid special attention to the European Tempus and Erasmus scheme for cooperation, with over a dozen large-scale projects successfully implemented over the last 20 years. KFU students and academic staff have experienced training at European universities as part of both "Integration, Interaction and Institutions (Triple I)" and "Aurora" projects (Erasmus Mundus program).

== Library ==
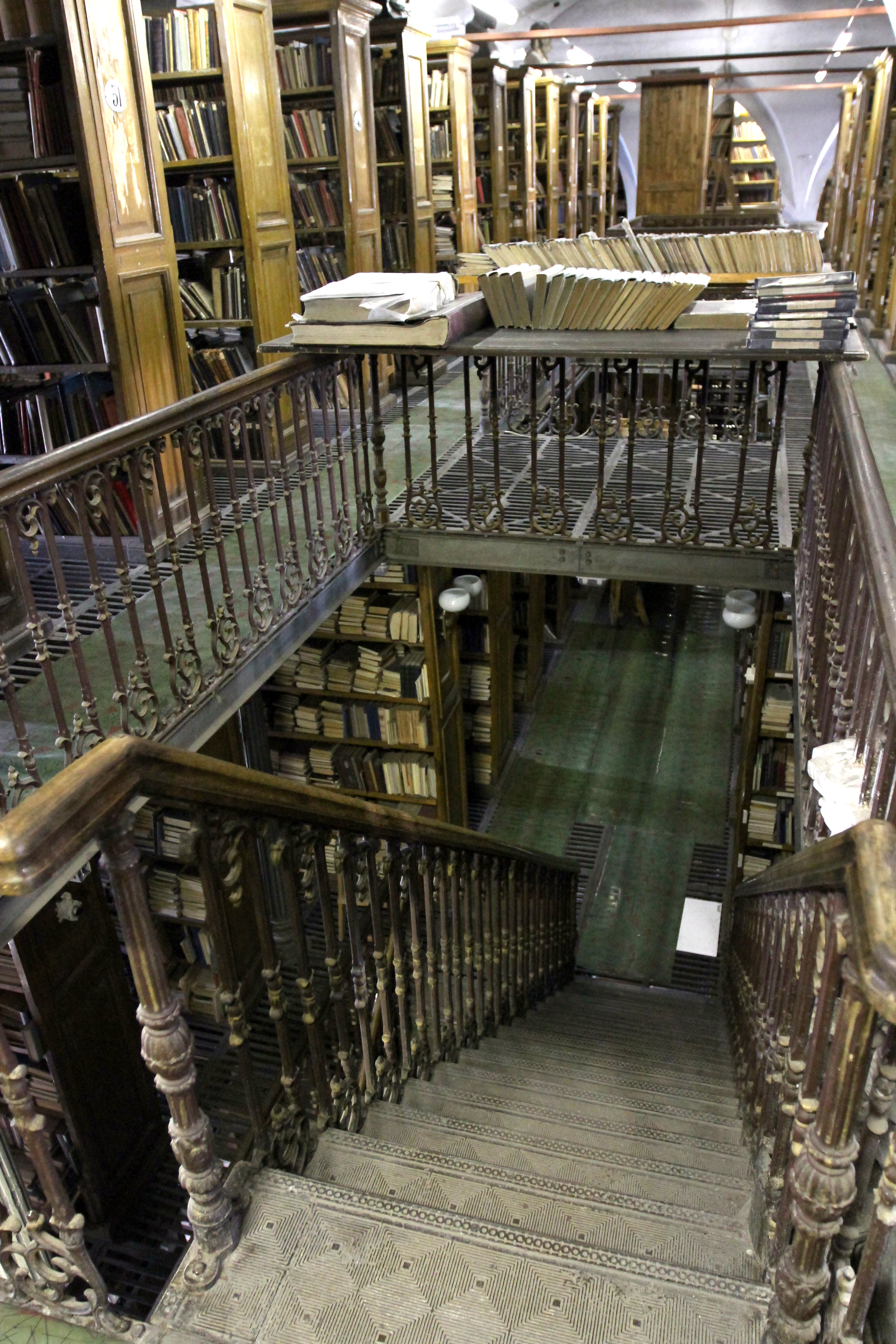
The Department of Rare Books and Manuscripts of Nikolai Lobachevsky Scientific Library

Kazan University Nikolai Lobachevsky Scientific Library bibliographical collections, including 15,000 manuscripts and 3,000 rare books. Opened in 1809, it first contained Count G. Potemkin's books brought to Kazan in 1799. Subsequently, the collections of Solovetsky Monastery were added to the library.

These original books remain in the special depository of the library. In this special collection are Arabic manuscripts of Persian philosophers and scholars Mansur Al-Hallaj and Avicenna (11th century), a manuscript copy of the Pentateuch, and the "Books of Kingdoms" by Francisco Skorin (1518). The Library has first editions of the 18th-century books by Pushkin, Griboyedov, Gogol, and Tuqay. The library contains 19th-century periodicals, and literature about Kazan and the surrounding region. The original library building was built between 1825 and 1833 by Rector N. Lobachevsky, who was at the same time the chief librarian of the university.

== Notable faculty and alumni ==
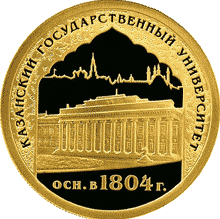

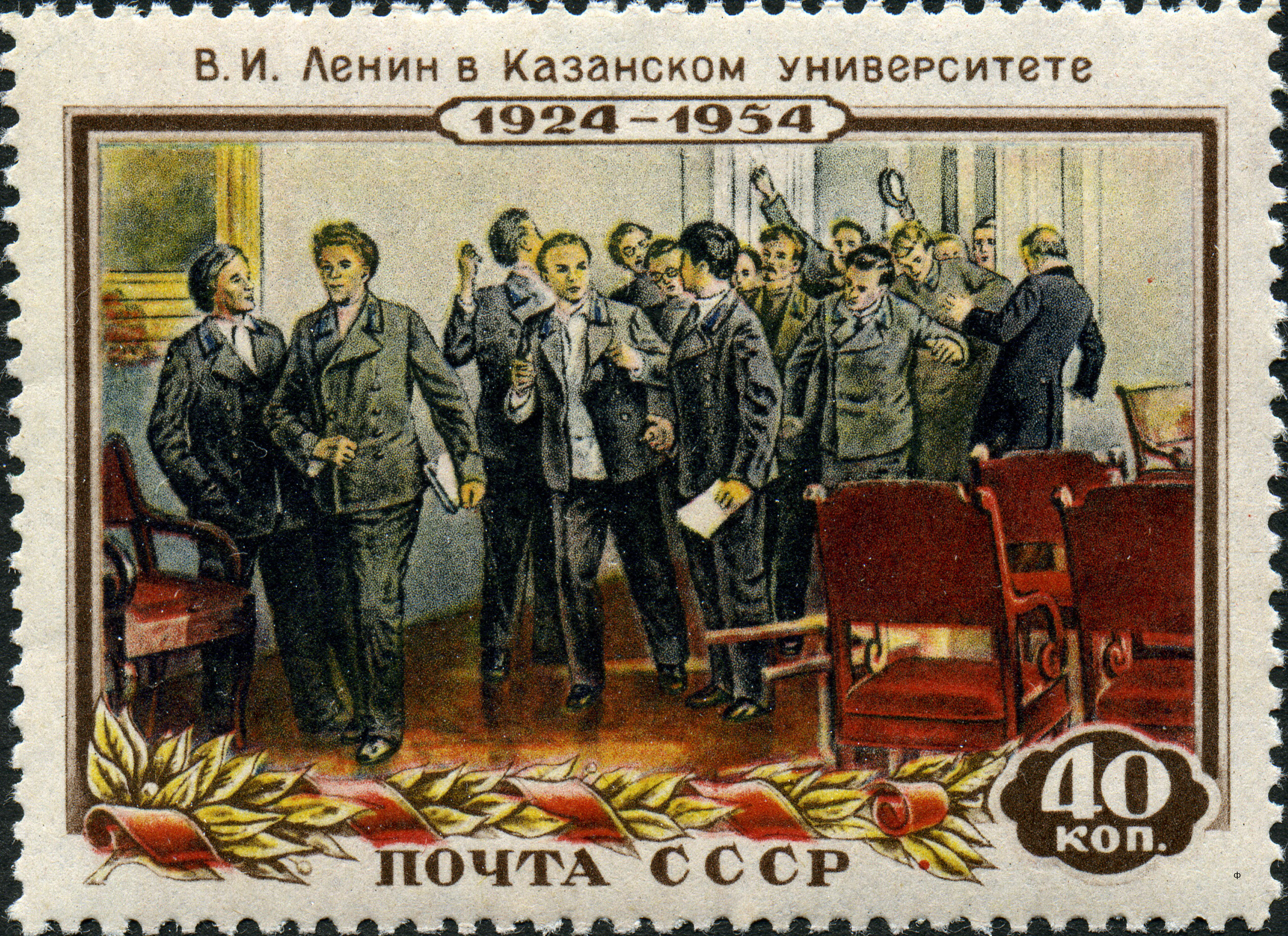
1954 postage stamp depicting Lenin at Kazan University

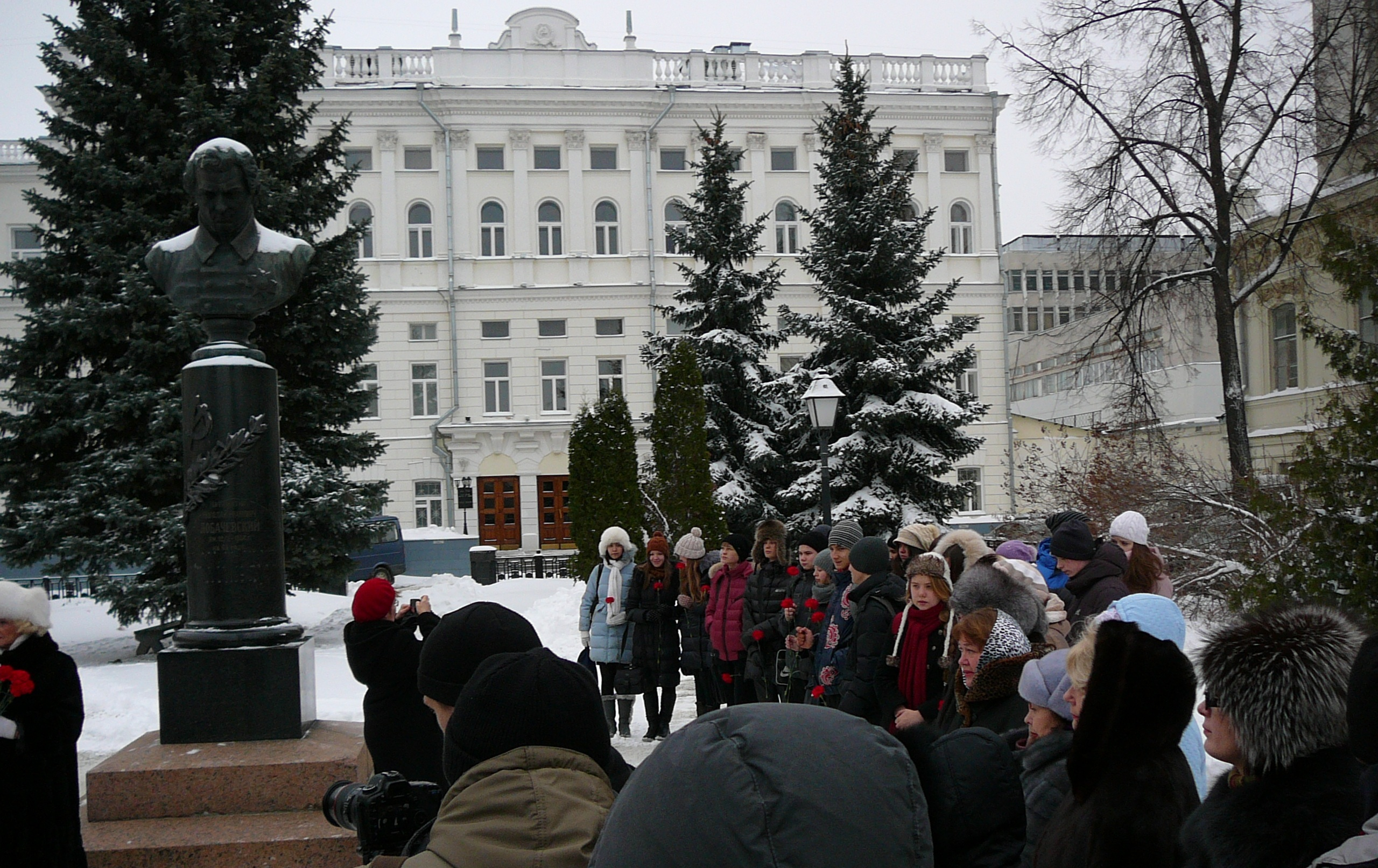
Annual celebration of the birthday of Nikolay Lobachevsky by participants of Volga's Mathematical Olympiad of students

=== Politics ===
Sergey Aksakov, Vladimir Lenin (expelled), Leon Litinetsky, Alexei Rykov, Xösäyen Yamaşev, Sergei Bakinsky, Vasili Osipanov, Nikolai Semashko, Dmitry Karakozov, Nikolay Fyodorov.

=== Mathematics and sciences ===
Aleksandr Arbuzov, Nikolai Chebotaryov, Aleksandr Butlerov, Naum Meiman, Kimal Akishev, Nikolay Lobachevski, Ivan Simonov, Vladimir Markovnikov, Konstantin Mereschkowski, Nikolay Beketov, Nikolay Zinin, Alexander Zaytsev, Sergey Reformatsky, Alexander Vishnevsky, Liverij Darkshevich, Platon Poretsky, Nikolai Brashman, Karl Ernst Claus, Joseph Johann Littrow, Johann Bartels, Adolph Theodor Kupffer, Marian Kowalski, Aleksandr Kotelnikov, Mikhail Lavrentyev, Yevgeny Zavoisky, Vladimir Engelgardt, Alexander Luria, Dmitry Dubyago, Alexander Dubyago, Georgii Frederiks, Semen Altshuler, Mikhail Lyapunov, Dmitrii Sintsov, Oskar Anderson, Wilhelm Anderson, Kadir Timergazin, Vladimir Moskovkin, Emmanuel Rashba.

=== Music and art ===
Mily Balakirev, Stanislav Govorukhin, Ilya Ulyanov, Stepan Smolensky, Karl Fuchs, Michael Minsky (Spirin), Yuliya Zaripova, Oleg Saitov.

=== Literature ===
Pavel Melnikov-Pechersky, Velimir Khlebnikov, Pyotr Boborykin, Eugenia Ginzburg, Leo Tolstoy, Daniil Mordovtsev, Alexander Tarasov-Rodionov.

=== Other ===
Jan Niecisław Baudouin de Courtenay, Vladimir Bekhterev, Mikołaj Kruszewski, Ivan Yakovlev, Vladimir Burtsev, Peter Lesgaft, Sergey Malov, Nikolay Ilminsky, Afanasy Shchapov, Christian Martin Frähn, Alexander Kazembek, Nicolai A. Vasiliev, Vasily Vasilyev, Józef Kowalewski, Nikolay Likhachyov, Nikolay Neprimerov, Vasili Razumovsky, Nikolai Anderson, Walter Anderson (folklorist), Valentin A. Bazhanov, Mariam Atlas, Murad Al Maamari.

== See also ==
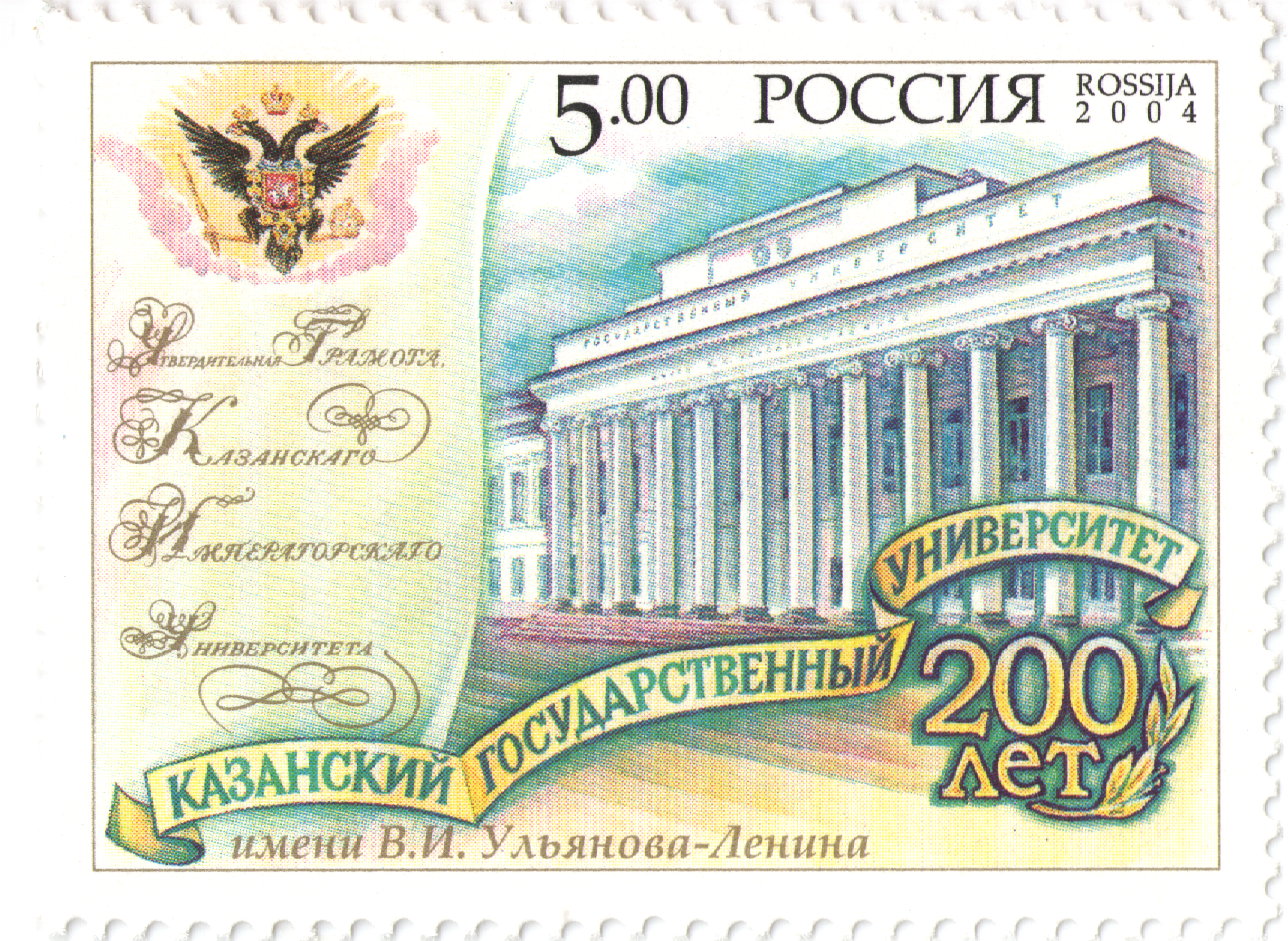
Kazan University on a 2004 postage stamp.

- Education in Russia
- List of modern universities in Europe (1801–1945)
- List of Kazan State University's rectors
- List of universities in Russia
