= Karl Fuchs (museum founder) =

Museum founder

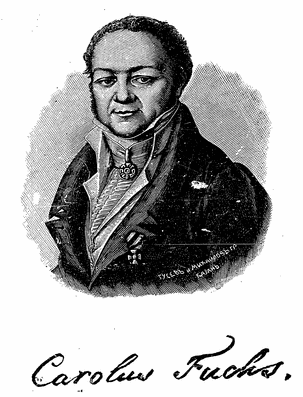
Karl Fuchs (museum founder).

Karl Fuchs was an ethnic German from Kazan in Tatarstan. He founded the Kazan Zoo in 1806, as well as the Botanical Museum in Kazan. He served as the Rector of Kazan University from 1823 to 1827.
