= Victor Savrin =

Russian physicist (born 1944)

Victor Ivanovich Savrin
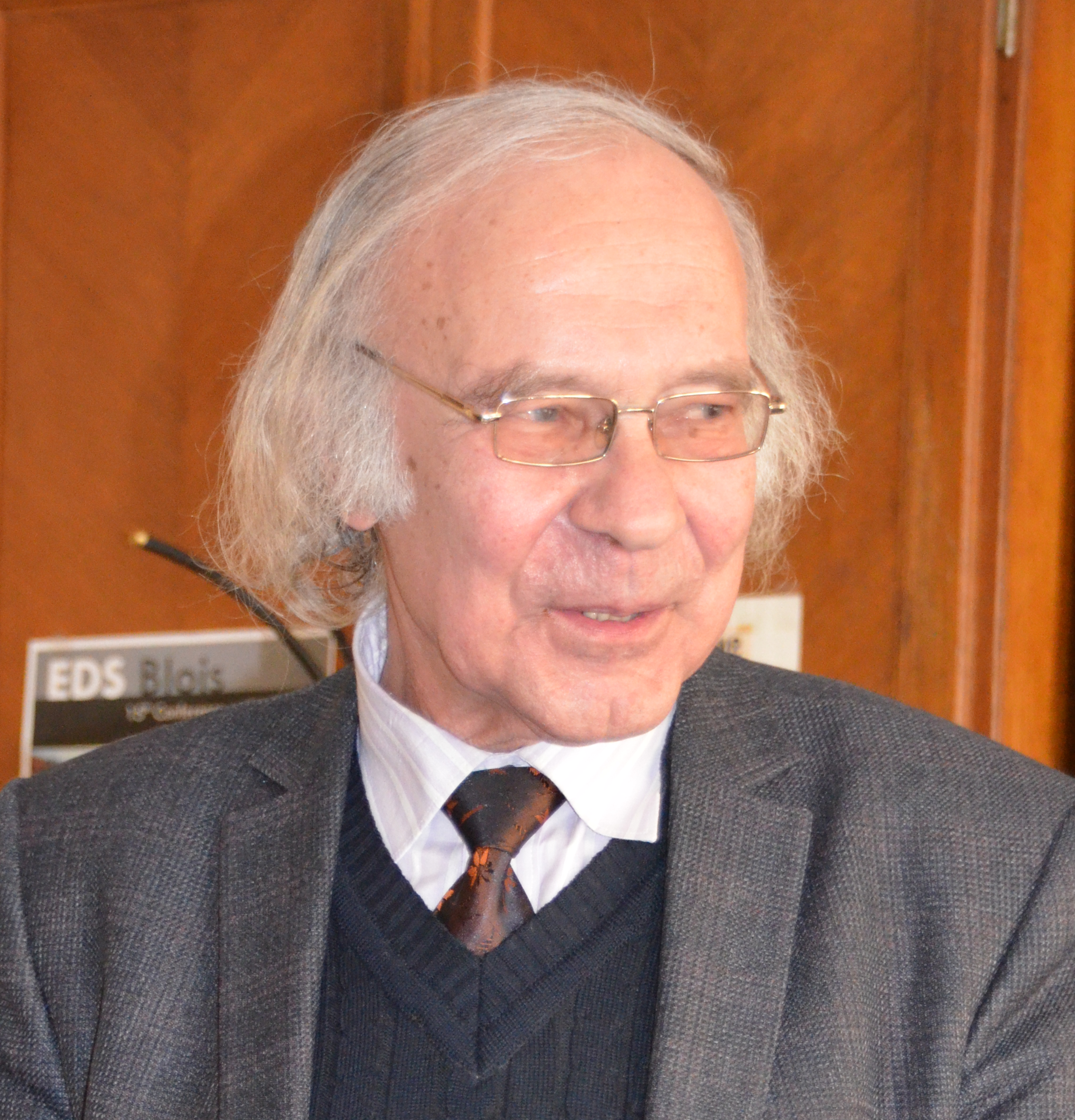
- Born: Виктор Иванович Саврин; December 4, 1944; Chapayevsk, Kuybyshev Oblast, Russia, USSR
- Education: Moscow State University
- Scientific career
- Fields: Elementary particle physics, quantum field theory
- Workplaces: Institute for High Energy Physics, Institute of Nuclear Physics of MSU, Faculty of Physics of MSU
- Doctoral advisor: Oleg Khrustalev

Victor Ivanovich Savrin (Russian: Виктор Иванович Саврин; born 4 December 1944) is a Russian physicist known for his contributions to theoretical elementary particle physics and quantum field theory.

== Biography ==
Victor Savrin was born on 4 December 1944 in Chapayevsk, Kuybyshev Oblast (now Samara Oblast), USSR. In 1947 his family moved to Kuybyshev (now Samara), and later, in the early 1950s, to Moscow. In 1962, after finishing school, Victor Savrin started his studies at the Faculty of Physics of Moscow State University, which he graduated in 1968.

From 1968 Savrin worked at the Institute for High Energy Physics in Protvino, Moscow Region, first as a doctoral student (1968–1970), then as a researcher (1971–1977) and senior researcher (1977–1983). In 1970 he successfully defended his doctoral (C.Sc.) thesis, titled Applying the unitarity condition to the description of high-energy hadronic interactions, and in 1978 he defended his D.Sc. thesis, titled A density matrix method in the theory of inclusive reactions.

From 1983 Victor Savrin has worked at the Institute of Nuclear Physics of Moscow State University, first as the leader of the Laboratory of Analytical Calculations in Quantum Field Theory, and then, since 1990, as the head of the Division of Theoretical High Energy Physics. From 1984 he has been a deputy director of the Institute of Nuclear Physics of MSU, supervising the institute's scientific research.

From 1977 Savrin has been teaching a number of courses at the Faculty of Physics of Moscow State University. He became a professor in 1998. Since 2009 he has been the head of the Chair of Physics of Atomic Nucleus and Quantum Theory of Collisions at the MSU Faculty of Physics.

== Research ==
The main scientific results of Victor Savrin are related to the development of Quantum Field Theory (QFT) methods needed to describe elementary particle interactions at high energies. Some methods are used to apply the unitarity condition to the scattering of particles. A number of publications are devoted to the three-dimensional QFT formulation and the development of a quasi-potential approach to the description of particle interactions — in particular, for the relativistic theory of bound states and the corresponding applications in the framework of Quantum Chromodynamics (QCD). A number of results were obtained for the quarkonium spectra, as well as for the parameters of the narrow electromagnetic resonances. Savrin is also involved in the coordination of modern accelerator projects related to the study of elementary particle properties, including those conducted at the Large Hadron Collider (LHC).

== Some papers ==
- A.A. Logunov, V.I. Savrin, N.E. Tyurin, and O.A. Khrustalev, One-time equation for a two-particle system in quantum field theory, Theoretical and Mathematical Physics, 1971, 6, No.2, p. 113–119.
- V.I. Savrin and N.B. Skachkov, New scaling properties of the structure functions in the single-time formulation of the quantum field theory, Nuovo Cimento, 1981, 65, No.1, p. 1–14.
- B.A. Arbuzov, V.I. Savrin, and S.A. Shichanin, On a mechanism of GSI resonance production, Physics Letters, 1992, B275, No.1–2, p. 144–148.
- S. Abdullin, M.N. Dubinin, V.A. Ilyin, D.N. Kovalenko, V.I. Savrin, and N.V. Stepanov, Higgs boson discovery potential of LHC in the channel pp → γγ+jet, Physics Letters, 1998, B431, No.3–4, p. 410–419.
- V.A. Matveev, V.I. Savrin, A.N. Sissakian, and A.N. Tavkhelidze, Relativistic quark models in the quasipotential approach, Theoretical and Mathematical Physics, 2002, 132, No.2, p. 1119–1136.
