= Vladimir Teplyakov =

Russian experimental physicist (1925–2009)

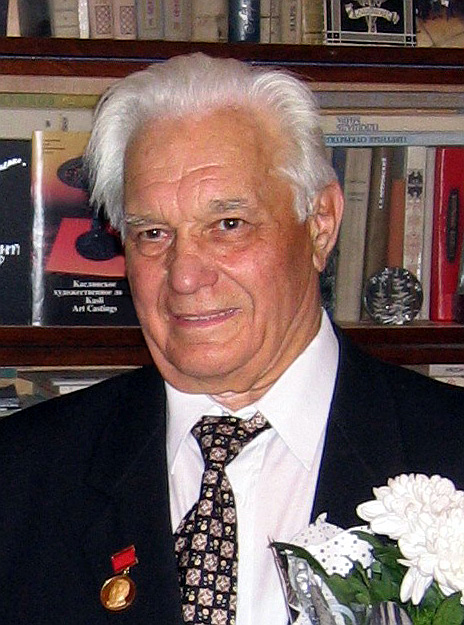
- Born: 6 November 1925
- Died: 10 December 2009 (aged 84); Protvino, Russia
- Known for: High energy physics Accelerator physics
- Awards: Lenin Prize (1988); Order of Lenin; Order of the October Revolution; Order of Glory 3rd Class; Order of the Patriotic War 2nd Class; Medal "For Valour"; Medal "For the Victory over Germany in the Great Patriotic War 1941–1945"; Medal "For the Capture of Vienna"
- Scientific career
- Fields: Physics
- Workplaces: Institute for High Energy Physics; Semenov Institute of Chemical Physics

Vladimir Aleksandrovich Teplyakov (Russian: Владимир Александрович Тепляков) (6 November 1925 – 10 December 2009) was a Russian experimental physicist known for his work on particle accelerators. Together with I.M. Kapchinsky, he invented the principle of the radio-frequency quadrupole (RFQ), which revolutionized the acceleration of low-energy charged particle beams.

== Biography ==
Teplyakov was born in Tambov, Russia. At the age of 17, in January 1943, he was drafted into the Red Army to fight in the Second World War, serving in the 3rd Ukrainian Front. He participated in a number of operations in Right-bank Ukraine, Moldavia and Eastern Europe and was awarded combat orders and medals.

After the war, he graduated from the All-Union Correspondence Polytechnic Institute in Moscow and joined the team of scientists at the Institute of Chemical Physics of the Soviet Academy of Sciences who worked on the large particle accelerator for conversion of uranium-238 into weapons-grade plutonium-239. From 1959 to 1966 he worked at Chelyabinsk-70 to develop a high-current proton linear particle accelerator ("linac") for controlled thermonuclear fusion. In the mid-1960s, together with G. M. Anisimov, Teplyakov conceived the idea of focusing the charged particle beams by the radio-frequency (RF) accelerating electromagnetic field rather than by solenoid magnets. This work continued at the Institute for High Energy Physics (IHEP) in Protvino, where his group moved in 1966 to build the I-100, a 100 MeV Alvarez drift-tube linac, which was an injector to the U-70, a 70 GeV proton synchrotron, the world's largest particle accelerator at that time.

By the late 1960s, Teplyakov and I. M. Kapchinsky developed the concept of the radio-frequency quadrupole (RFQ), where accelerating gaps are supplemented with spacer electrodes charged under an intermediate potential. Such a focusing system resulted in a noticeable upgrade in performance and a significant decrease in the dimensions of the drift tubes. Teplyakov subsequently developed several RFQ drift-tube structures and RF cavities to drive them. The URAL-30 proton linac was commissioned in 1977. It applies a through front-to-end RFQ-focusing up to the top energy of 30 MeV. Since 1985 URAL-30 routinely operates as an injector to the booster proton synchrotron of IHEP.

Teplyakov was the author of more than 100 inventions and scientific papers, and was the co-author of the book Linear Accelerators of Ions.

== Honours and awards ==
For the invention of the RFQ, Teplyakov was awarded the 1988 Lenin Prize (together with Kapchinsky) and the U.S. Particle Accelerator School Prize for Achievement in Accelerator Physics and Technology. In 2006, the European Physical Society awarded him the prize "for outstanding work in the accelerator field". Teplyakov received the highest decorations bestowed by the Soviet Union, the Order of Lenin and the Order of the October Revolution. He was one of the first to receive the title "Veteran of Nuclear Industry" and also received the title "Honored Worker of Science and Technology of the Russian Federation". Teplyakov died on 10 December 2009.
