= Garbuzov =

- Gender: Masculine
- Languages: Russian, Ukrainian

Other gender
- Feminine: Garbuzova

Other names
- Alternative spelling: Garbousov

Garbuzov (Russian: Га́рбузов) is a surname of Slavic origin.

== People with the surname ==
- Andrei Garbuzov (born 1984), Russian football player
- Andrey Garbuzov (born 1983), Russian rugby union player
- Dmitri Z. Garbuzov (1940 – 2006), Soviet and American inventor
- Gennady Garbuzov (1930 – 2009), Soviet bantamweight boxer
- Sergey Garbuzov (born 1974), Russian water polo player
- Vadim Garbuzov (born 1987), Canadian and Austrian ballroom dancer
- Vasily Garbuzov (1911 – 1985), Soviet economist and politician, Minister of Finance of the USSR (1960 – 1985)
- Yulii Garbuzov (1941 – 2016), was a Soviet and Ukrainian science fiction writer.

Garbuzova:

- Raya Garbousova (1909 – 1997), American cellist and teacher

== See also ==
- Arbuzov
- Harbuziv, village in Ukraine
