= OKA (experiment) =

Particle physics detector experiment

OKA (Russian: ОКА — Опыты с КАонами, literal translation "Observations of KAons") is a particle physics detector experiment at the U-70 accelerator in the Institute for High Energy Physics located in Protvino near Moscow (Russia). OKA is specialized experiment with separated charge kaons beam.

Superconducting high radio-frequency separator produces a beam of charged kaons intensity (4 ÷ 6) · 10^{6} K for a cycle with momenta 12.5 and 18 GeV. Experimental complex includes the decay volume with veto system, the wide-aperture magnetic spectrometer consists of a set of proportional chambers, straw tubes, drift tubes and hodoscope, the Cherenkov counters for charged particle identification, the electromagnetic calorimeter known as GAMS-2000 detector, the total absorption hadron calorimeter and the muon counters.

The research program of the experiment has the following items:

- Search for new physics beyond the Standard Model - the new (pseudo)scalar and tensor interactions in the weak leptonic and semi-leptonic decays of K-mesons and other deviations from the V – A theory.
- Search the effects of direct CP-violation in the decays of K^{±}-mesons.
- The study of hadron interactions – chiral perturbation theory, lattice QCD, dispersion sum rules and so on.
- Hadron spectroscopy.
- Coulomb processes in kaon-nucleon and pion-nucleon interactions.

The sensitivity of the OKA experiment will enable to observe decays with branching fractions of about 10^{−8}.
