= Boris Arbuzov (physicist) =

Russian physicist

Boris Andreevich Arbuzov
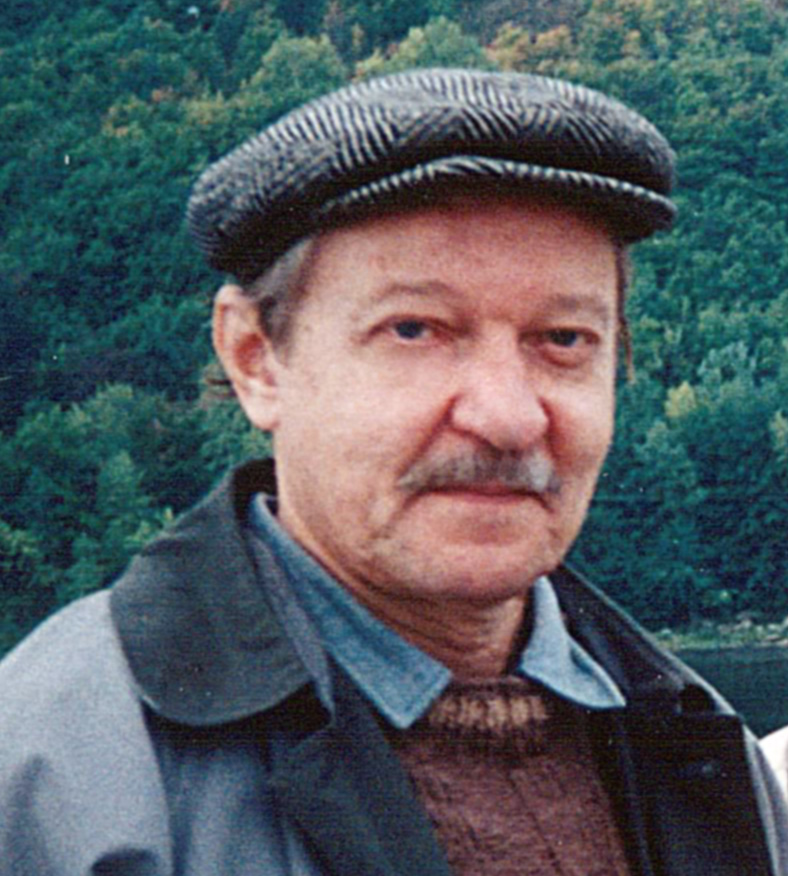
- Born: Борис Андреевич Арбузов; 12 May 1938; Moscow, Russia, USSR
- Education: Moscow State University
- Scientific career
- Fields: Theoretical physics, elementary particle physics
- Workplaces: Joint Institute for Nuclear Research, Institute for High Energy Physics, Institute of Nuclear Physics of MSU
- Doctoral advisor: Anatoly Logunov

Boris Andreevich Arbuzov (Russian: Борис Андреевич Арбузов; born 12 May 1938) is a Russian physicist known for his contribution to theoretical elementary particle physics and quantum field theory.

== Biography ==
Boris Arbuzov was born on 12 May 1938 in Moscow. His father was Major General Andrei Ivanovich Arbuzov (1908—1979), known expert in the precision-bombing theory.

After finishing the school Boris Arbuzov started his studies at Faculty of Physics of Moscow State University, which he graduated in 1961.

From 1962 to 1965 Arbuzov worked at Joint Institute for Nuclear Research in Dubna, Moscow Region, as a researcher of the Laboratory of Theoretical Physics. In 1965 he successfully defended his doctoral (C.Sc.) thesis entitled On expandability of the S-matrix in powers of the coupling constant in quantum field theory.

In 1966 Boris Arbuzov moved to Institute for High Energy Physics in Protvino, Moscow Region, where he worked as a senior researcher, and then as a director of laboratory and a principal researcher. In 1970 Arbuzov successfully defended his D.Sc. thesis devoted to Geometrical schemes of the interaction of elementary particles.

From 1973 to 1993 Arbuzov was a member of the Scientific Council on Neutrino Physics of the Academy of Sciences of the USSR (later — Russian Academy of Sciences).

From 1999 Boris Arbuzov has worked at Institute of Nuclear Physics of Moscow State University as a leading researcher of the Division of Theoretical High Energy Physics. From 1973 he has been teaching a course in Theory of Elementary Particles at the Faculty of Physics of Moscow State University. He became a professor in 1980.

== Research ==
The main scientific results of Boris Arbuzov are related to studies of non-perturbative effects in quantum field theory, and also to development of the corresponding methods to describe the interactions between elementary particles. In particular, these methods have been applied to spontaneous symmetry breaking in electroweak interaction, as well as to solving the Schwinger–Dyson equations for Green's functions in quantum chromodynamics.

== Selected papers ==
- B.A. Arbuzov, A.A. Logunov, A.N. Tavkhelidze, and R.N. Faustov, The asymptotic behavior of the scattering amplitudes and the renormalisation group method, Physics Letters, 1962, 2, No.3, p. 150—152.
- B.A. Arbuzov and A.A. Logunov, Structure of elementary particles and relationships between the different forces of nature, Soviet Physics Uspekhi, 20, p. 956—969, 1977.
- A.I. Alekseev, B.A. Arbuzov and V.A. Baykov, Infrared asymptotic behavior of gluon Green's functions in quantum chromodynamics, Theoretical and Mathematical Physics, 52, No.2, p. 739—746, 1982.
- B.A. Arbuzov, E.E. Boos, and A.I. Davydychev, Infrared asymptotics of gluon Green's functions in covariant gauge, Theoretical and Mathematical Physics, 74, No.2, p. 103—108, 1988.
- B.A. Arbuzov, V.I. Savrin, and S.A. Shichanin, On a mechanism of GSI resonance production, Physics Letters, B275, No.1—2, p. 144—148, 1992.
- Boris A. Arbuzov, Non-perturbative effective interactions in the Standard Model (225 pages), De Gruyter Studies in Mathematical Physics, v.23, Berlin, Walter de Gruyter, 2014, ISBN 978-3-11-030292-9.
