= Andrey Garbuzov =

Andrey Garbuzov may refer to:

- Andrei Garbuzov (footballer) (born 1984), Russian football player
- Andrey Garbuzov (rugby union) (born 1983), Russian rugby union player
