= Boris Arbuzov =

Boris Arbuzov may refer to:

- Boris Arbuzov (chemist) (1903–1991), Russian and Soviet chemist
- Boris Arbuzov (physicist) (born 1938), Russian and Soviet physicist
