= IHEP =

IHEP may refer to:

- Institute for High Energy Physics Protvino, Moscow, Russia
- Institute of High Energy Physics, Chinese Academy of Sciences
