= Rolf Wideroe Prize =

The Rolf Wideroe Prize is awarded every third year by the Accelerator Group of the European Physical Society (EPS), in memory of Rolf Widerøe, to individuals in recognition of outstanding work in the field of accelerator physics.

The prize was awarded for the first time in 1996, but was only named the Rolf Wideroe Prize in 2011. Before this year the prize was simply referred to as EPS Accelerator Group Prizes.

== Laureates ==
- 2023: Katsunobu Oide
- 2020: Lucio Rossi
- 2017: Lyn Evans
- 2014: Mikael Eriksson
- 2011: Shin-Ichi Kurokawa
- 2008: Alexander Chao
- 2006 Vladimir Teplyakov
- 2004: Igor Meshkov
- 2002: Kurt Hübner
- 2000: Eberhard Keil
- 1998: Cristoforo Benvenuti
- 1996: R.D. Kohaupt and the DESY Feedback Group: M. Ebert, D. Heins, J. Klute, K.-H. Matthiesen, H. Musfeldt, S. Pätzold, J. Rümmler, M. Schweiger, J. Theiss

== See also ==
- List of physics awards
