= UNK proton accelerator =

Uncompleted particle accelerator in Russia

Coordinates: 54°52′18″N 37°11′19″E

The UNK proton accelerator is an uncompleted project of 3 TeV large superconductor-based particle accelerator in Protvino, near Moscow, Russia, at the Institute for High Energy Physics. The U-70 synchrotron commissioned in 1967 was supposed to act as an injector for the UNK proton-proton collider ring.

Construction was started in 1983. In eleven years, a 21 kilometer long, 5 meter wide underground tunnel was completed, as well as a 2.7 kilometer long tunnel connecting U-70 with UNK. Electromagnetic, vacuum and surveillance equipment was mounted. After the breakup of the Soviet Union and the economic collapse in Russia the project was defunded and halted, and many scientists involved in the project were later engaged in other similar projects worldwide.

As the similar project has been already commissioned at CERN, the Russian Government has decided to direct the particle physics funding to another accelerator project – NICA.

== See also ==
- Superconducting Super Collider
- Large Hadron Collider
