= Lyn Evans =

Welsh physicist

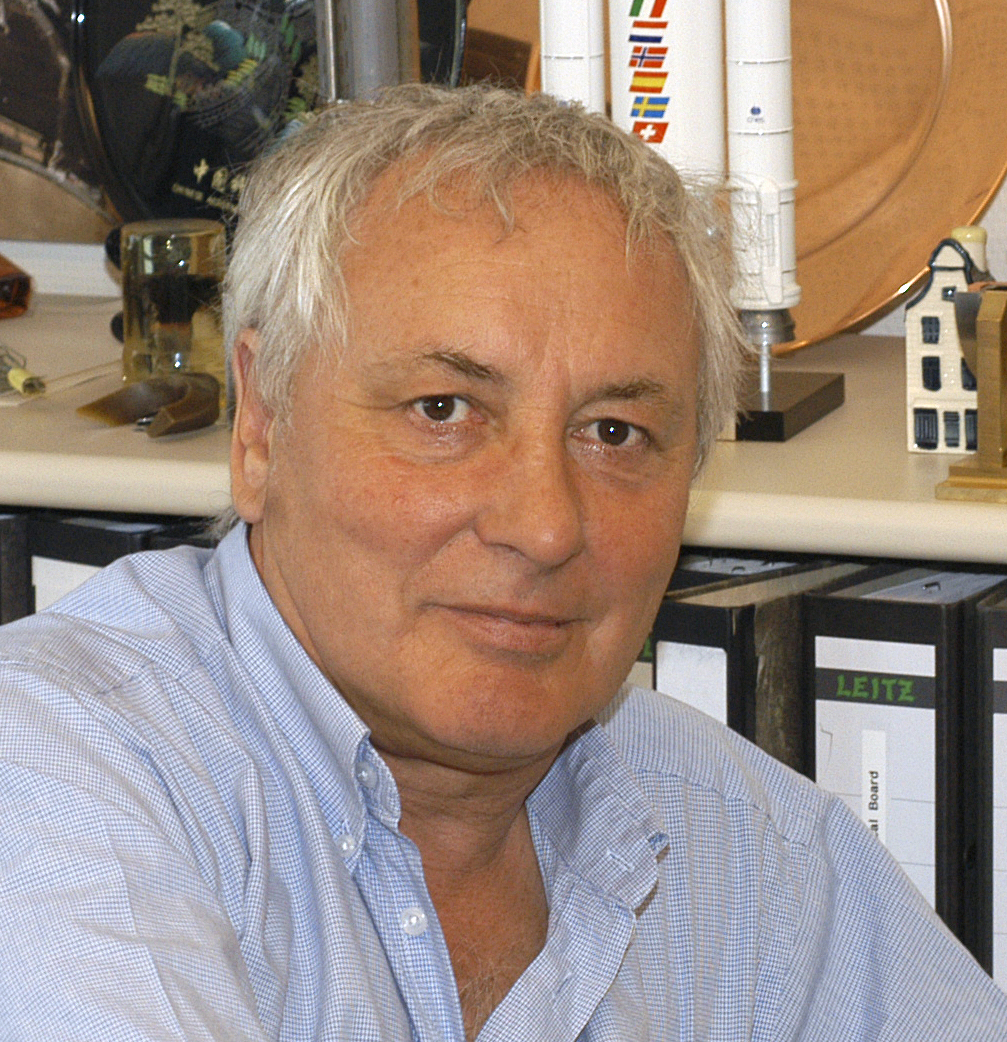
- Evans in 2012
- Born: Lyndon Rees Evans; 1945 (age 80–81); Aberdare, Wales
- Education: Swansea University
- Awards: Fundamental Physics Prize (2012)
- Scientific career
- Fields: Physics
- Workplaces: CERN, Large Hadron Collider; Linear Collider Collaboration

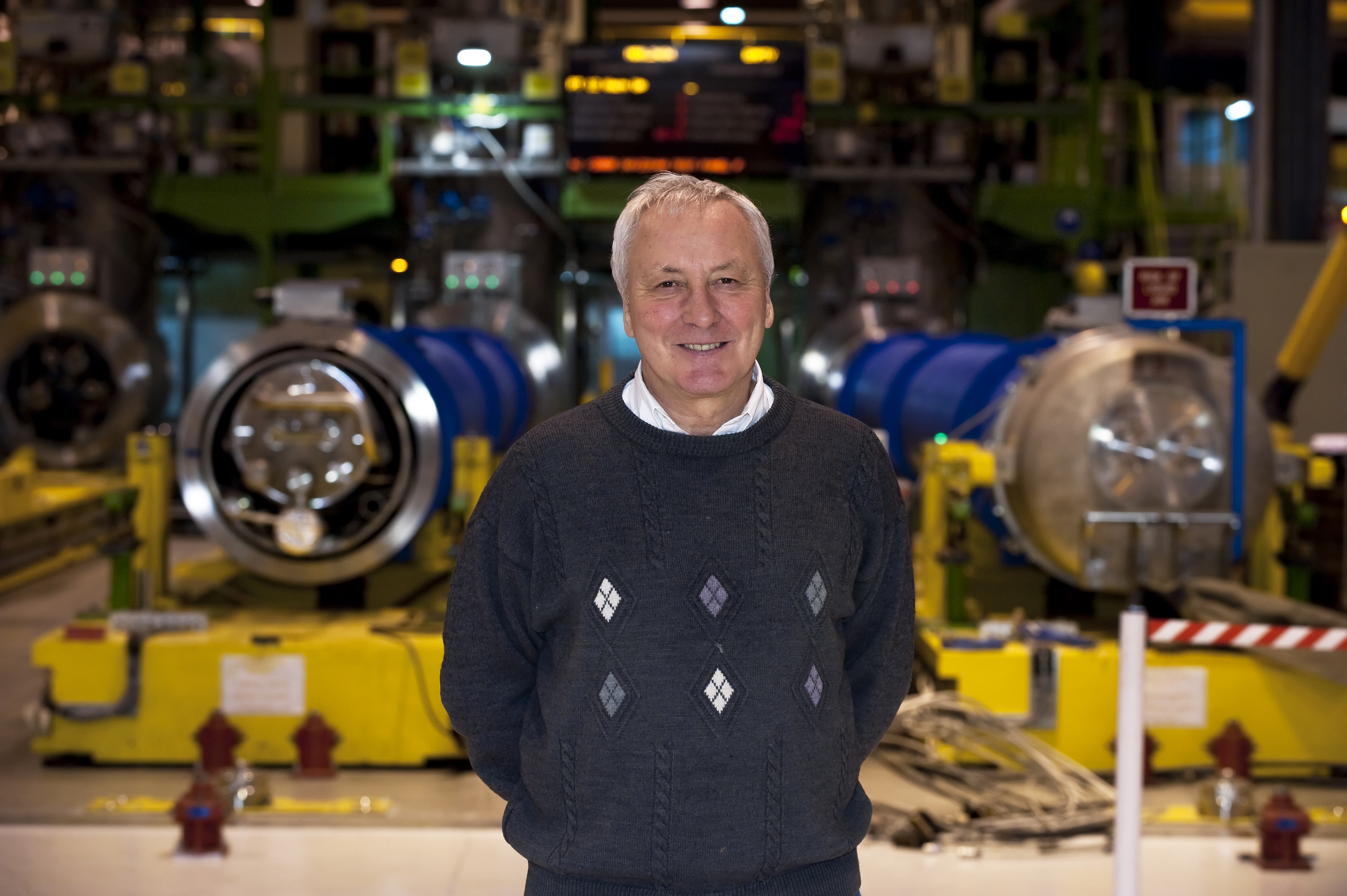
Lyn Evans in his role as the LHC Project leader (2008)

Lyndon Rees Evans (born 1945) is a Welsh scientist who served as the project leader of the Large Hadron Collider in Switzerland. Based at CERN, in 2012 he became the director of the Linear Collider Collaboration, an international organisation managing development of next generation particle colliders, including the International Linear Collider and the Compact Linear Collider.

== Biography ==
Born and raised in Cwmbach near Aberdare in the South Wales Valleys, Evans had an interest in chemistry in his youth, initially enrolling in university to study the subject before switching to physics because he found the subject easier. Evans was educated at Aberdare Boys' Grammar School, where he developed an interest in physics. However, he found it difficult to pass his O Level in French, a qualification which was required to allow him to enter his course at the University College of Swansea (now Swansea University), from where he graduated in 1970. He switched to physics in his second year of undergraduate study at Swansea. He went to CERN initially as a research fellow, having previously visited the establishment in 1969 as a visitor.

In 1994, he became involved in the planning of the project which would become the Large Hadron Collider. He served as the LHC project leader until 2008. In 2011 at the international symposium on subnuclear physics held in Vatican City, he gave a talk The Proton Beam for the Neutrino Velocity Measurement with OPERA.

In June 2012, the International Committee for Future Accelerators selected Evans as Director of the Linear Collider Collaboration, an international effort promoting construction of a new linear collider to complement CERN's Large Hadron Collider.

== Awards and honours ==
- Evans has been a Fellow of the American Physical Society since 1991.
- He was appointed CBE in the 2001 New Year Honours.
- He was made an honorary fellow of the University of Wales Swansea in 2002.
- He was awarded an honorary Doctor of Science from the University of Glamorgan (now University of South Wales) in July 2010.
- In 2010, Evans was also elected a Fellow of the Royal Society.
- In 2011, Evans was elected a Fellow of the Learned Society of Wales.
- On 11 December 2012, he was awarded the 2012 Special Fundamental Physics Prize. He was cited, "For his leadership role in the scientific endeavour that led to the discovery of the new Higgs-like particle by the A Toroidal LHC ApparatuS (ATLAS) and Compact Muon Solenoid (CMS) collaborations at CERN's Large Hadron Collider".
- The Institute of Physics awarded him the Glazebrook Medal in 2013, citing him "for his leadership of the Large Hadron Collider Project".
- He received the 2013 Special Breakthrough Prize, "For his leadership role in the scientific endeavour that led to the discovery of the new Higgs-like particle by the ATLAS and CMS collaborations at CERN's Large Hadron Collider".
- He received the IEEE Simon Ramo Medal in 2014, for exceptional achievement in systems engineering and systems science, "For systems leadership of the Large Hadron Collider Project from conceptual design through completion of construction".
- He received the Rolf Widerøe Prize in 2017
