= Anatoli Bugorski =

Soviet and Russian scientist (born 1942)

Anatoli Petrovich Bugorski
- Анатолий Бугорский
- Born: Anatoli Petrovich Bugorski; 25 June 1942 (age 84); Russian SFSR, Soviet Union
- Education: National Research Nuclear University MEPhl (PhD)
- Known for: Surviving a particle accelerator accident
- Spouse: Vera Nikolaevna
- Children: 1
- Scientific career
- Fields: Particle physics
- Workplaces: Institute for High Energy Physics

Anatoli Petrovich Bugorski (Russian: Анатолий Петрович Бугорский; born 25 June 1942) is a Russian retired particle physicist. He is known for having survived a radiation accident in 1978, when a high-energy proton beam from a particle accelerator passed through his head.

== Accident ==
As a researcher at the Institute for High Energy Physics in Protvino, Russian SFSR, Bugorski worked with the largest particle accelerator in the Soviet Union, the U-70 synchrotron. On 3 June 1978, he was checking a malfunctioning piece of equipment when the safety mechanisms failed. Bugorski was leaning over the equipment when he stuck his head in the path of the 76 GeV (12.2 nJ) proton beam. He reportedly saw a flash "brighter than a thousand suns" but did not feel any pain. The beam passed through the back of his head, the occipital and temporal lobes of his brain, the left middle ear, and out through the left-hand side of his nose. The exposed parts of his head received a local dose of 200,000 to 300,000 roentgens (2,000 to 3,000 sieverts). Bugorski understood the severity of what had happened, but continued working on the malfunctioning equipment, and initially opted not to tell anyone what had happened.

== Aftermath ==
Doctors expected him to die, but he survived with severe, non-fatal injuries. The left half of Bugorski's face swelled up beyond recognition and, over the next several days, the skin started to peel, revealing the path that the proton beam had burned through parts of his face, his bone, and the brain tissue underneath. As it was believed that he had received far in excess of a fatal dose of radiation, Bugorski was taken to a clinic in Moscow where the doctors could observe his expected demise. However, Bugorski survived, completed his PhD, and continued working as a particle physicist. There was virtually no damage to his intellectual capacity, but the fatigue of mental work increased markedly. Bugorski completely lost hearing in the left ear, replaced by a form of tinnitus. The left half of his face became paralysed due to the destruction of nerves. He was able to function well, except for occasional complex partial seizures and rare tonic-clonic seizures. The paralysed side of his face does not have wrinkles.

Bugorski continued to work as a physicist at the Institute for High Energy Physics, eventually becoming the experiment coordinator for the same particle accelerator by which he was injured.

Because of the Soviet Union's policy of maintaining secrecy on nuclear power-related issues, Bugorski did not speak publicly about the accident for over a decade. He continued going to the Moscow radiation clinic twice a year for examinations and to meet with other nuclear accident victims. He was described as "a poster boy for Soviet and Russian radiation medicine".

In 1996, Bugorski applied unsuccessfully for disability status to receive free epilepsy medication. Bugorski showed interest in making himself available for study to Western researchers but could not afford to leave Protvino.

== Personal life ==
Bugorski is married to Vera Nikolaevna, and they have a son.

== See also ==
- Proton therapy
- Trần Đức Thiệp – survived irradiation of the hand by an electron beam in 1992
- Harold McCluskey – survived massive exposure to americium in 1976
- Phineas Gage – survived piercing through of the skull by an iron rod in 1848
- List of civilian radiation accidents
