= Lucio Rossi =

Italian physicist

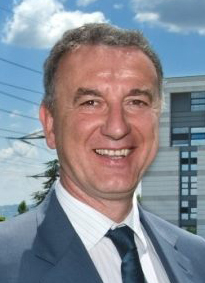
- Lucio Rossi
- Born: 24 September 1955 (age 70); Podenzano, Italy
- Education: University of Milan
- Known for: LHC project
- Awards: Rolf Wideroe Prize
- Scientific career
- Fields: Superconductivity in Physics
- Workplaces: University of Milan, CERN

Lucio Rossi (born 24 September 1955) is an Italian physicist who is working in the field of superconductivity. He has been working since 2001 at CERN, on leave from the University of Milan, where he directed the Magnets & Superconductors for the LHC project, worth €1.7 billion, half of the machine's entire budget. He was the project leader of the HL-LHC project.

== Biography ==
Lucio Rossi was born in Podenzano, Italy on 24 September 1955.

In 1981 he obtained his 'Laurea' in physics from University of Milan with a thesis on plasma physics. He was an academic researcher for many years after, interested in applied superconductivity for particle accelerators and in 1992 he became Professor of Experimental Physics in the University of Milan.

During the 1990s, Rossi was involved in many experiments such as the Superconducting Cyclotron (SC) currently in Catania, HERA at DESY in Hamburg and Large Hadron Collider at CERN. His main activities were the design and construction of coils, solenoids, superconductors and prototypes for magnets.

From 2001-2011 he led the Magnet Superconductor and Cryostat Group (MSC) for the LHC project. Since 2011 he has been leader of the High Luminosity for LHC. In 2011 at the international symposium on subnuclear physics held in Vatican City, he gave a talk The Large Hadron Collider of CERN and the Roadmap Toward Higher Performance.

Since 1985 Rossi is one of the founders of "Euresis", a Milan-based association for the promotion of scientific culture established in Milan.

From October 2020 he resumed active service as full professor at the Physics Department of the University of Milan.

== Awards ==
- 2007: IEEE Council of Superconductivity Award
- 2013: IEEE fellow award
- 2020: Rolf Widerøe Prize
- 2023: "Enrico Fermi" Prize

== See also ==
- CERN
- Large Hadron Collider
