= Vitali Yelsukov =

Russian footballer

Personal information
- Full name: Vitali Nikolayevich Yelsukov
- Date of birth: 2 October 1973 (age 53)
- Place of birth: Protvino, Russian SFSR
- Height: 1.72 m (5 ft 7 1/2 in)
- Position: Midfielder

Senior career*
Years	Team	Apps	(Gls)
1991	FC Dynamo-2 Moscow	1	(0)
1992–1994	FC Dynamo Moscow	0	(0)
1992–1994	→ FC Dynamo-d Moscow (loans)	73	(8)
1994	FC Tekhinvest-M Moskovsky	26	(3)
1995–1998	FC Fakel Voronezh	80	(2)
1999–2000	FC Serpukhov (amateur)		
2000	FC Dynamo-MGO-Mostransgaz Moscow		
2001–2003	FC Obninsk (amateur)		
2004	FC Obninsk	8	(1)
2004–2005	FC Volga Tver	26	(0)
2005–2006	FC Nara-Desna Naro-Fominsk	19	(0)
2006	FC Zvezda Serpukhov	6	(0)
2009–2010	FC Real-Tver Tver		

Managerial career
- 2007–2008: FC Nara-ShBFR Naro-Fominsk (administrator)
- * Club domestic league appearances and goals

Vitali Nikolayevich Yelsukov (Russian: Виталий Николаевич Елсуков; born 2 October 1973) is a former Russian football player.
