= Nixelpixel =

Russian feminist and video blogger

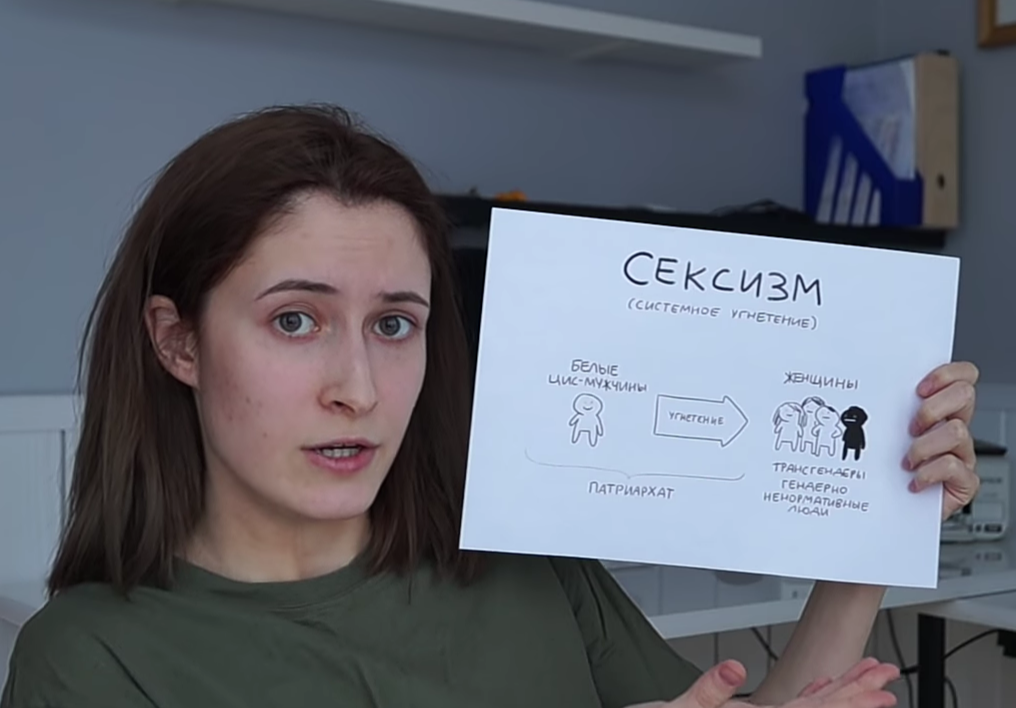
- Born: Veranika Sergeevna Wodwood; 20 October 1993 (age 33); Protvino, Moscow Oblast, Russia
- Education: Higher School of Economics
- Occupations: YouTuber, feminist, activist
- Years active: 2012–present
- Website: nixelpixel.com

Nika Wodwood (Russian: Ника Водвуд; born October 20, 1993, Protvino, Moscow Oblast), better known as nixelpixel, is a Russian intersectional feminist and cyber activist who maintains her video blog on YouTube. The most famous feminist in Russia, according to the publication Meduza.

== Biography ==
Wodwood was born on October 20, 1993, in Protvino. Parents are design engineers, employees of the Mars, Incorporated. In 1999, her parents went on a business trip to the UK, and Veranika moved with them to a suburb in London, where she lived for two years. Returning to Russia, Wodwood entered school in Stupino.

In 2011-2015, she studied at the Faculty of Sociology of the Higher School of Economics. In 2013, Wodwood became interested in feminism after she met Zhenya Belykh's the blog, the creator of the feminist community The Power of the Pussy on VKontakte, although she was initially ironic about the topic of feminism.

She worked as an assistant to the creative director in an advertising agency, but left, according to her statement, because of the intolerant environment in the team. Since 2011, she was engaged in illustration, after leaving the advertising agency she was engaged in it remotely as her main activity. In the middle of summer 2017, she quit an advertising agency where she was engaged in copywriting and started making money on her video blog through Patreon and advertising on YouTube.

She got married in May 2021. In August of the same year, she announced that she was moving to Vienna, following her husband, who entered the master's program at the Central European University.

Wodwood's public activities have been criticized, even by fellow feminist activists.
