= Radio-frequency quadrupole =

Linear accelerator component

A radio-frequency quadrupole (RFQ) is a linear accelerator component generally used at low beam energies, roughly 2 keV to 3 MeV. It is similar in layout to a quadrupole mass analyser but its purpose is to accelerate a single-species beam (a beam of one particular type of particle) rather than perform mass spectrometry on a multiple-species beam. As charged particles are accelerated along the beam line they alternately experience electric fields in two axes at right angles to the direction of motion, offset in phase, such that there is always a forwards force in the beam direction (Z), plus a beam focussing action alternately in X and then in Y. This is achieved by exciting 4 electrodes that run the length of the accelerator, and are shaped to have a periodically varying gap that matches the RF frequency to the beam velocity at that point in the accelerator. This causes the particles to form bunches in step with the exciting frequency, such that they pass through each region as the local field is near the acceleration maxima. There are two common electrode shapes, either a group of 4 vanes with a wave pattern on the tips that approach, or 4 cylinders with periodic conical sections. The electrodes are mounted in vacuum and excited from by suitably phased signals from a high power RF source. The advantages over a conventional RF LINAC with separated RF cavities and drift tubes are firstly that the beam is constantly accelerating (there is no drift space) so the design can be made considerably more compact for a given energy, and secondly the bunching and focussing of the beam.

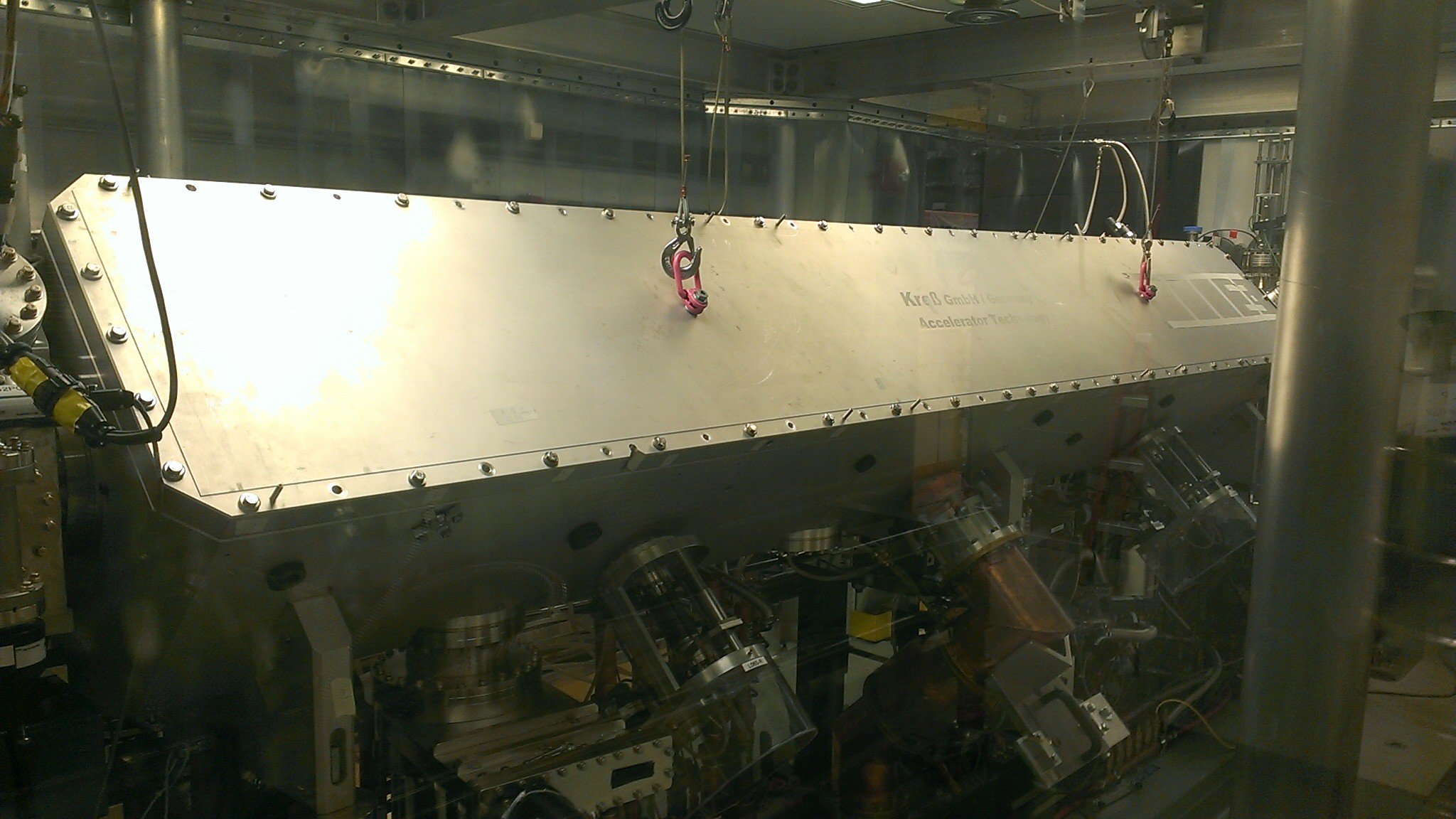
The Radio-frequency quadrupole from the re-accelerator (ReA3) at the National Superconducting Cyclotron Laboratory (NSCL) at Michigan State University.

The RFQ is a combined-function component that both accelerates and focuses the beam of charged particles. Invented by Soviet physicists I. M. Kapchinsky and Vladimir Teplyakov in 1970, the RFQ is used as an injector by major laboratories and industries throughout the world for radiofrequency linear accelerators.
