= Arbuzov =

Arbuzov (masculine, Russian: Арбузов) or Arbuzova (feminine, Russian: Арбузовa) is a Russian surname, derived from the word арбуз (arbooz, meaning "watermelon"). It may refer to:

- Aleksandr Arbuzov (1877–1968), Russian and Soviet chemist
- Aleksei Arbuzov (1908–1986), Soviet playwright
- Boris Arbuzov (1903–1991), Russian and Soviet chemist
- Boris Arbuzov (b. 1938), Russian and Soviet physicist
- Serhiy Arbuzov (b. 1976), former bank director and former Vice Prime Minister of Ukraine in 2014
