= Alexander Wu Chao =

Taiwanese-American physicist

- Born: July 2, 1949 (age 77); Taiwan
- Education: National Tsing Hua University (BS); Stony Brook University (PhD)
- Known for: Research on accelerator physics and beam-beam interactions
- Scientific career
- Fields: Physics
- Workplaces: Stanford University
- Thesis: The Geometric Picture in High Energy Collisions (1974)
- Doctoral advisor: Yang Chen-Ning

Alexander Wu Chao (born July 2, 1949) is a Taiwanese-American physicist, specializing in accelerator physics.

== Education and career ==
Chao was born in Taiwan. He graduated in 1970 with a B.S. in physics from Taiwan's National Tsing Hua University. He received in 1974 his Ph.D. in physics from the University of New York at Stony Brook, where his doctoral advisor was C. N. Yang. At SLAC National Accelerator Laboratory, Chao was a research associate from 1974 to 1976, an experimental physicist from 1976 to 1982, and the group leader of the Beam Dynamics Group from 1982 to 1984. From 1984 to 1989 he was the division head of the Accelerator Physics Division of the Central Design Group of the Superconducting Super Collider (SSC) project at Berkeley, California. In 1989 when construction of the SSC started, he moved to Texas, where from 1989 to 1993 he held a joint appointment as a scientist at the SSC Laboratory and as an adjunct professor at the University of Texas, Austin. When the U.S. Congress cancelled the SSC project in 1993, Chao returned to SLAC as a full professor at Stanford University. At SLAC of Stanford he was a full professor from 1993 to 2017, when he retired as professor emeritus. He has been from 2011 to the present a chair professor at National Tsinghua University in Taiwan and from 2016 to the present a distinguished visiting professor at Tsinghua University in China.

Chao's research on accelerator physics and beam-beam interactions, include "collective instability theory for intense charged-particle beams, nonlinear dynamics of particle motion in accelerators, spin dynamics, laser-particle interaction, and physics of coherent radiation sources." He was involved in the development of important accelerator projects at SLAC, including the Stanford Linear Collider (SLC), PEP, and SPEAR.

He was one of the founders of the Overseas Chinese Physics Association (OCAP) Accelerator School (held in Taiwan, China, and Singapore), which was first held in 1998 in Taiwan.

Chao was elected in 1989 a Fellow of the American Physical Society and in 2002 an Academician of Academia Sinica, Taiwan. He received in 2008 the Rolf Wideroe Prize of the European Physical Society, in 2016 the U.S. Particle Accelerator School Achievement Prize, and in 2017 the Robert R. Wilson Prize of the American Physical Society.

== Selected publications ==
=== Articles ===
- Chao, A. W.; Yang, C. N. (1973). "Opaqueness of pp collisions from 30 to 1500 GeV/c". Physical Review D. 8 (7): 2063–267. Bibcode:1973PhRvD...8.2063C. doi:10.1103/PhysRevD.8.2063.
- Chao, Alexander W. (1979). "Evaluation of beam distribution parameters in an electron storage ring". Journal of Applied Physics. 50 (2): 595–598. Bibcode:1979JAP....50..595C. doi:10.1063/1.326070. OSTI 1446930.
- Chao, Alexander W.; Richter, Burton; Yao, Chi-Yuan (1980). "Beam emittance growth caused by transverse deflecting fields in a linear accelerator". Nuclear Instruments and Methods. 178 (1): 1–8. Bibcode:1980NucIM.178....1C. doi:10.1016/0029-554X(80)90851-4. OSTI 1445579.
- Ruth, R. D.; Chao, A. W.; Wilson, P. B.; Morton, P. L. (1984). "A plasma wake field accelerator" (PDF). Particle Accelerators. 17 (SLAC-PUB-3374): 171–189.
- Meller, R. E.; Chao, A. W.; Peterson, J. M.; Peggs, S. G.; Furman, M. (1987). "Decoherence of kicked beams" (PDF). SSC-N-360 (Superconducting Super Collider, Report Number N-360. (16 pages)
- Huang, H.; Ball, M.; Brabson, B.; Budnick, J.; Caussyn, D. D.; Chao, A. W.; Collins, J.; Derenchuk, V.; Dutt, S.; East, G.; Ellison, M.; Friesel, D.; Hamilton, B.; Jones, W. P.; Lee, S. Y.; Li, D.; Minty, M. G.; Nagaitsev, S.; Ng, K. Y.; Pei, X.; Riabko, A.; Sloan, T.; Syphers, M.; Teng, L.; Wang, Y.; Yan, Y. T.; Zhang, P. L. (1993). "Experimental determination of the Hamiltonian for synchrotron motion with rf phase modulation" (PDF). Physical Review E. 48 (6): 4678–4688. Bibcode:1993PhRvE..48.4678H. doi:10.1103/PhysRevE.48.4678. OSTI 1441445. PMID 9961152.
- Chao, A. W. (2002). Lecture notes on topics in accelerator physics (No. SLAC-PUB-9574) (PDF). SLAC National Accelerator Lab., Menlo Park, CA (United States). (17 pages)
- Chao, Alexander W. (2009). "Gravitational instability of a nonrotating galaxy". Physical Review Special Topics - Accelerators and Beams. 12 (10) 104201. Bibcode:2009PhRvS..12j4201C. CiteSeerX 10.1.1.410.4080. doi:10.1103/PhysRevSTAB.12.104201.
- Ratner, Daniel F.; Chao, Alexander W. (2010). "Steady-State Microbunching in a Storage Ring for Generating Coherent Radiation". Physical Review Letters. 105 (15) 154801. Bibcode:2010PhRvL.105o4801R. doi:10.1103/PhysRevLett.105.154801. OSTI 1014130. PMID 21230912.
- Jiao, Y.; Wu, J.; Cai, Y.; Chao, A. W.; Fawley, W. M.; Frisch, J.; Huang, Z.; Nuhn, H.-D.; Pellegrini, C.; Reiche, S. (2012). "Modeling and multidimensional optimization of a tapered free electron laser" (PDF). Physical Review Special Topics - Accelerators and Beams. 15 (5) 050704. Bibcode:2012PhRvS..15e0704J. doi:10.1103/PhysRevSTAB.15.050704. S2CID 120606215.

=== Books ===
- Chao, Alex (24 May 1993). Physics of Collective Beam Instabilities in High Energy Accelerators. Wiley. ISBN 978-0-471-55184-3.
- Chao, Alexander Wu; Tigner, Maury, eds. (1999). Handbook of Accelerator Physics and Engineering. World Scientific. ISBN 978-981-02-3500-0.
- Chao, Alexander W.; Chou, Weiren, eds. (2009). Reviews of Accelerator Science and Technology: Volume 2: Medical applications of accelerators. World Scientific. ISBN 978-981-4299-35-0.
- Chao, Alexander Wu (14 October 2020). Lectures on Accelerator Physics. World Scientific. ISBN 978-981-12-2675-5.
