= Yulii Garbuzov =

Soviet and Ukrainian science fiction writer, translator

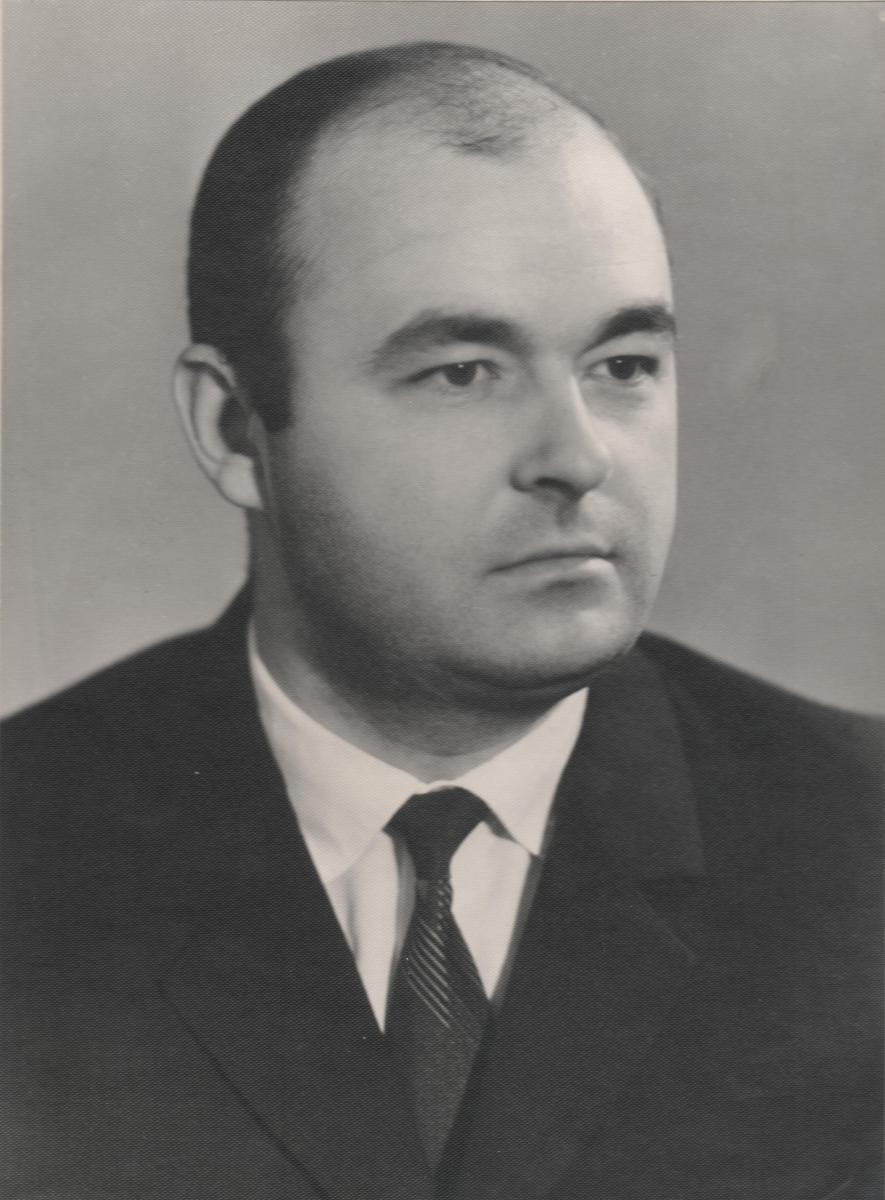
- Born: 23 September 1941
- Died: 28 December 2016 (aged 75); 13 Kharkiv cemetery
- Education: Kharkiv Polytechnic Institute
- Children: 2
- Writing career
- Language: Russian, Ukrainian
- Genres: Science fiction, fantasy

Yulii Viktorovych Garbuzov (September 23, 1941 – December 28, 2016) was a Soviet and Ukrainian science fiction writer, translator, PhD in Engineering, associate professor at the Kharkiv National University of Radio Electronics (NURE), and an author of numerous scientific and fiction works. He was a grandfather of the ballroom dancer Vadim Garbuzov.

== Biography ==
Yulii Garbuzov was born on September 23, 1941 in the city of Yenakiyevo, Donetsk Oblast, Ukraine. His grandmother, Desiron Stefania Emiliivna, came from Liege, Belgium to Donetsk at the age of 17, where she married Yulii's grandfather, Oleksii Yukhymovych. In 1937, Oleksii Yukhymovych was repressed, and his grandmother was forced to abandon her siblings and stay in Ukraine. Yulii's mother, Maria Andriiivna Garbuzova, and his father, Viktor Oleksiiovych Garbuzov, both were doctors. After the outbreak of World War II, in 1941 Viktor Garbuzov fought in the 19th Army of the USSR Armed Forces, which was encircled and almost completely captured by the Germans. After that, Victor was considered missing.

Maria, pregnant with Yulii, was sent by Viktor to Yenakiyevo to his grandmother Stefania Desiron, where Maria worked as a doctor after giving birth. Later, Maria Garbuzova was assigned to the village of Babanka in Cherkasy oblast, as a doctor for 33 neighbouring villages. Since Maria had to visit patients around the clock, she used to leave her son with her Polish neighbours. This helped Yulii learn Polish. Working as a village doctor allowed Maria and Yulii to avoid the postwar famine. However, she wished for Yulii to go to a city school. That is why, after the war, Maria found a new job as a sanitary inspector in Zaporizhzhia, where she and Yulii moved to, and where in 1947 Yulii started attending school #5.

In 1958, after finishing high school, Yulii Garbuzov enrolled in the Bachelor's program at the Radio Faculty of Kharkiv Polytechnic Institute. After graduation, he worked as a lecturer at the Transceivers Department of the Kharkiv Aviation Institute in 1968–1971, and then as a lecturer at the Department of Radio Engineering Fundamentals of his alma mater KhPI.

In 1971, by order of the Minister of Higher Education of Ukraine, Yulii was transferred to the Kharkiv Institute of Radio Electronics, now the Kharkiv National University of Radio Electronics (NURE). Here, in 1984, he defended his PhD thesis on Radio Engineering and Television Systems and began working as an associate professor at the same department. He taught theoretical disciplines such as «Signals and Processes in Radio Engineering» and «Theory and Application of Digital Signal Processing». He worked on classified research papers, which are now known only in narrow circles and remain under restricted access.

His grandmother's stories about his family roots had a profound impact on Yulii, awakening in him a desire to learn more about his distant relatives. In a letter to Radio Liberty, he described his search for his family as follows:

«... Then she (grandmother) was forced to give up on her brothers and sisters who lived in Liege. Before she died, in 1959, she made me promise to find her Belgian relatives at the first opportunity and ask them to forgive her. I fulfilled her request only in 1989.»

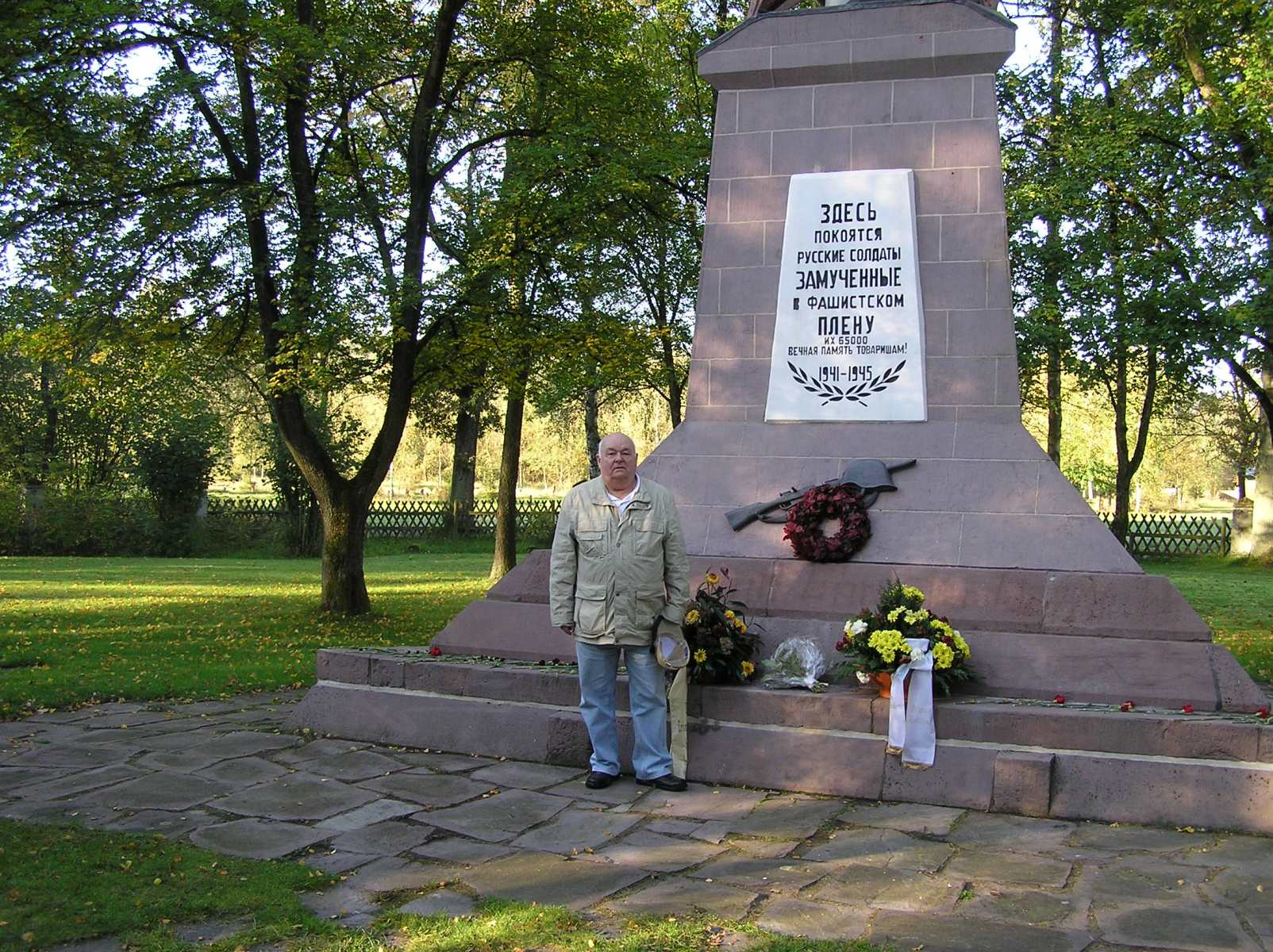
Yulii Garbuzov at the monument to the former concentration camp where his father is buried.

As Yulii had promised his grandmother, he was able to track down his distant relatives, the Desirons, with whom he corresponded from time to time. In 1989, Yulii Garbuzov managed to visit them in Liege.

For a long time, Yulii's father was considered missing, and only in 2003, according to Red Cross documents, it became known that he had been captured in the German concentration camp Stalag 326 since 1941, where he was tortured to death in 1943. In 2010, Yulii came from Kharkiv to visit his grandson, Vadim Garbuzov, in Vienna. At that time, Vadim and his dance partner, Katrin Menzinger, were participating in the Holland Masters competition in Arnhem, the Netherlands.

While the dancers were at the competition, Katrin's parents drove Yulii to the Dutch border with Germany, from where Yulii travelled to the concentration camp's memorial to visit his father's grave. After finding the concentration camp and talking to the worker at the memorial, where his father's body was resting, Yulii was unable to find Viktor Garbuzov's name on the plaque.

Yulii Garbuzov retired in 2009, which allowed him to devote more time to writing and publishing his works, as well as attending literary events in Kharkiv. After his retirement, he also worked as a translator for several translation agencies in Kharkiv (French, Polish, German, Ukrainian, and Russian). The writer died on December 28, 2016, of heart failure and lymphocytic leukemia and was buried in Kharkiv, at the cemetery 13.

== Literary legacy ==
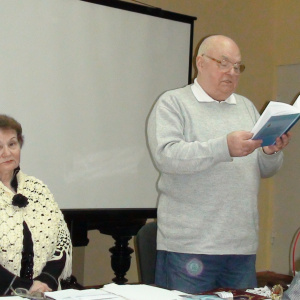
Garbusov presents his book "The Equations of the Universe" at a literary evening at the Belinsky Library. 2014.

The first known work «Non-Invented Story» was published in 1999 in St. Petersburg. Yulii Garbuzov wrote mostly fiction, for example: «Magic Fog», «The Red Knight», «Sagan-Rog», «Equations of the Universe». However, he also depicted the everyday people's life: «Fables of Old Gordey» or «Rye and tares». Since Yulii spent most of his life in a Russian-speaking environment, almost all of his works are written in Russian. He was fond of literature all his life, but he rarely published his works. However, after his retirement in 2009, he was able to delve deeper into writing and publishing his literature.

Since Yulii spent the majority of his life in a Russian-speaking environment, almost all of his works were written in Russian. Yulii Garbuzov had been passionate about literature all his life, but he rarely published his works and mostly wrote for himself. However, after retiring in 2009, he was able to devote more time to writing and publishing his literary works.

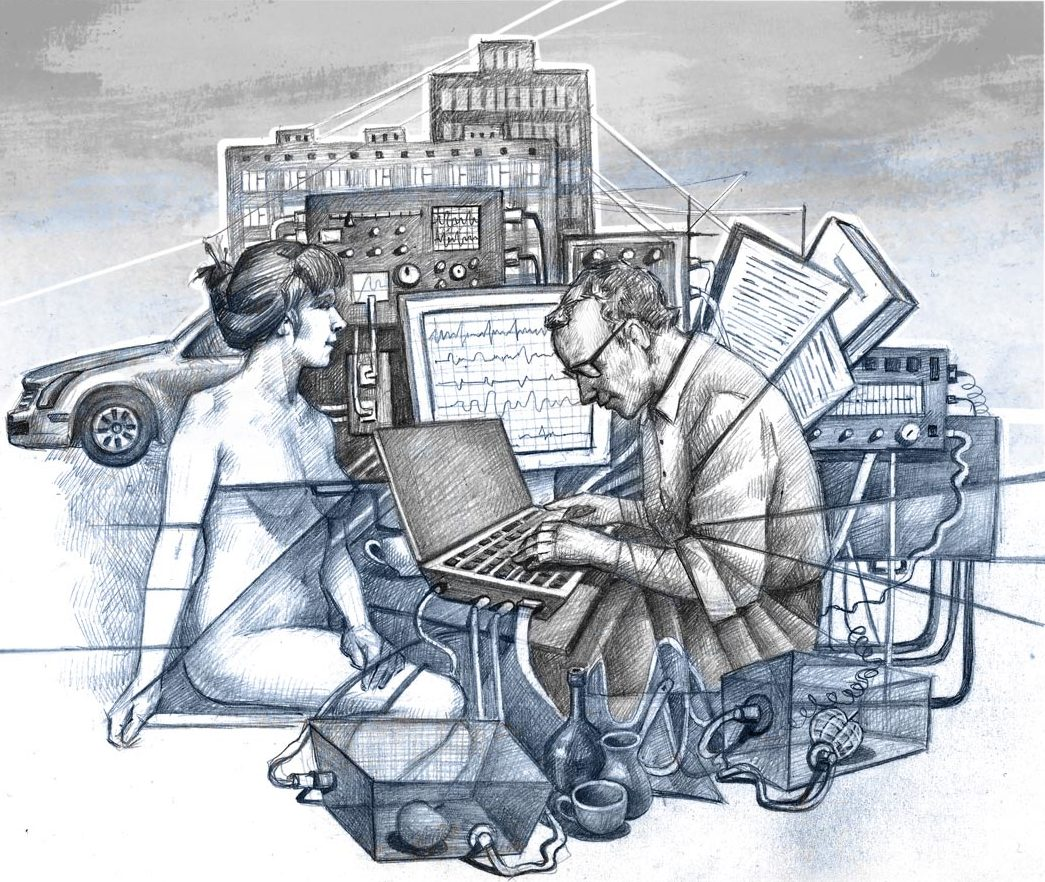
Cover for the novel «Equations of the Universe».Illustrations by Lubov Bodnarska.

In 2012, he published his main work, The «Equations of the Universe», a science fiction book that incorporates the themes of Yulii's research.This science fiction book was inspired by scientific research, particularly Yulii's studies on precise time measurement. The author was influenced by Yurii Voloshchuk, the head of the Radio Engineering Department, under whose guidance Yulii explored the essence of time. As a result, Yulii dedicated his book «Equations of the Universe» to Voloshchuk. In this book, the author describes how thoughts tend to materialize, how they affect objects, and the nature of relationships between people. The writer V. R. Vorgul thus commented on this work:

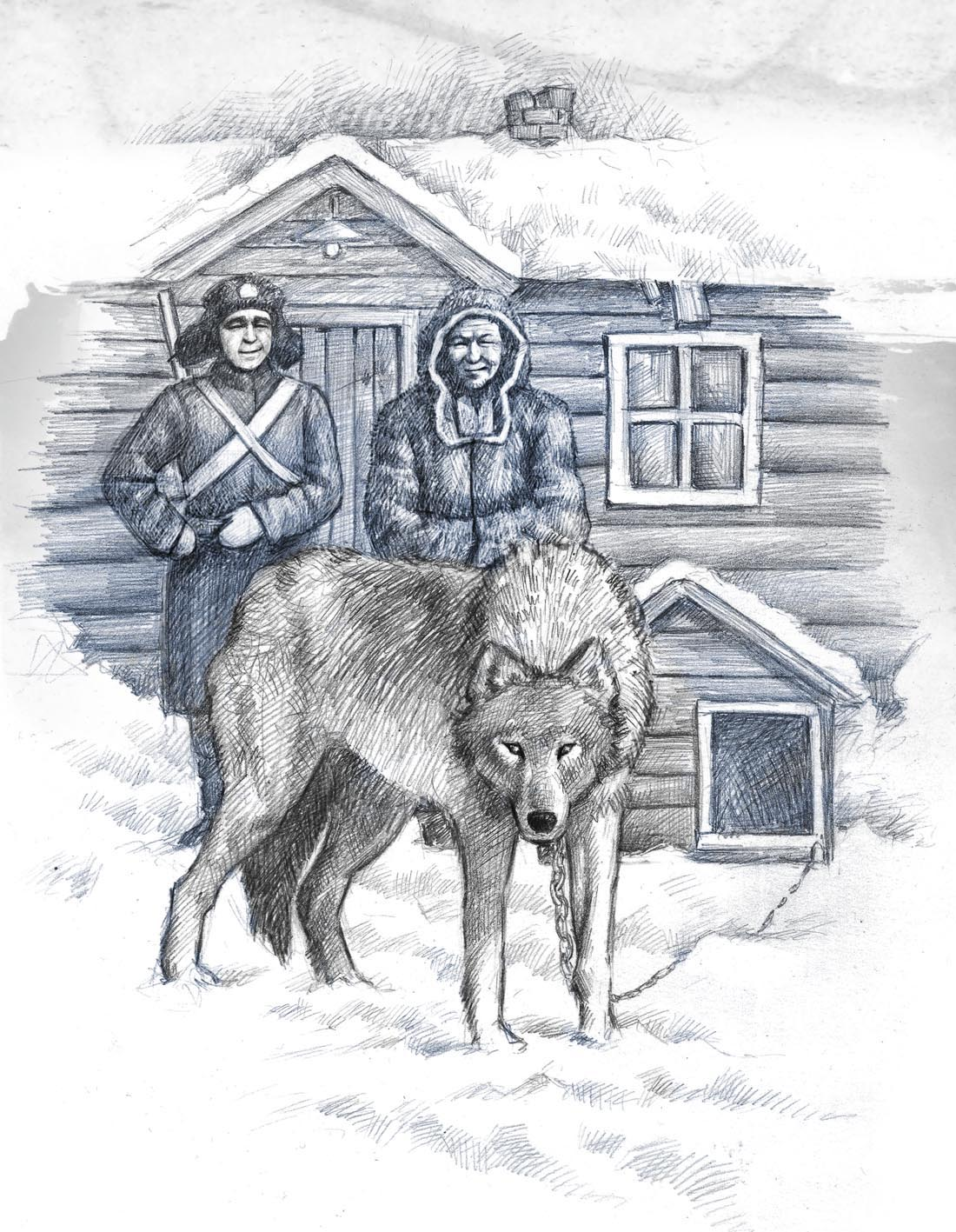
Cover for the short story «The Wolf at the Outpost» by Yulii Garbuzov. Illustrations by Lubov Bodnarska.

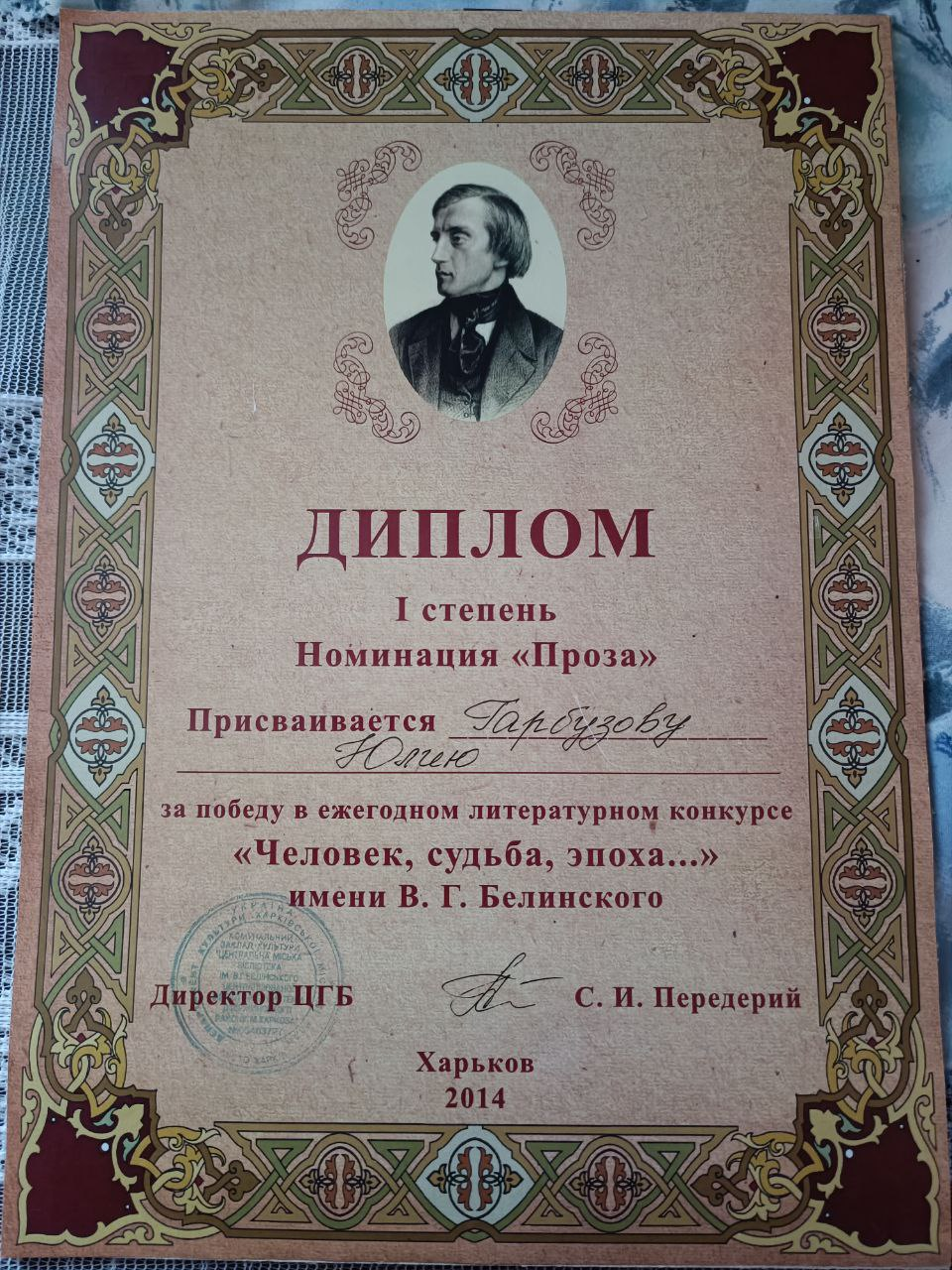
The diploma received by Yulii Garbuzov for the first prize in the contest «Human. Fate. Epoch».

«While reading the story, it's hard to believe it's fiction — you take everything at face value. Strength of spirit, integrity, and self-sacrifice "in the name of" and "for" some characters exist alongside the careerism, vulgarity, pettiness, and even sadism of others...»

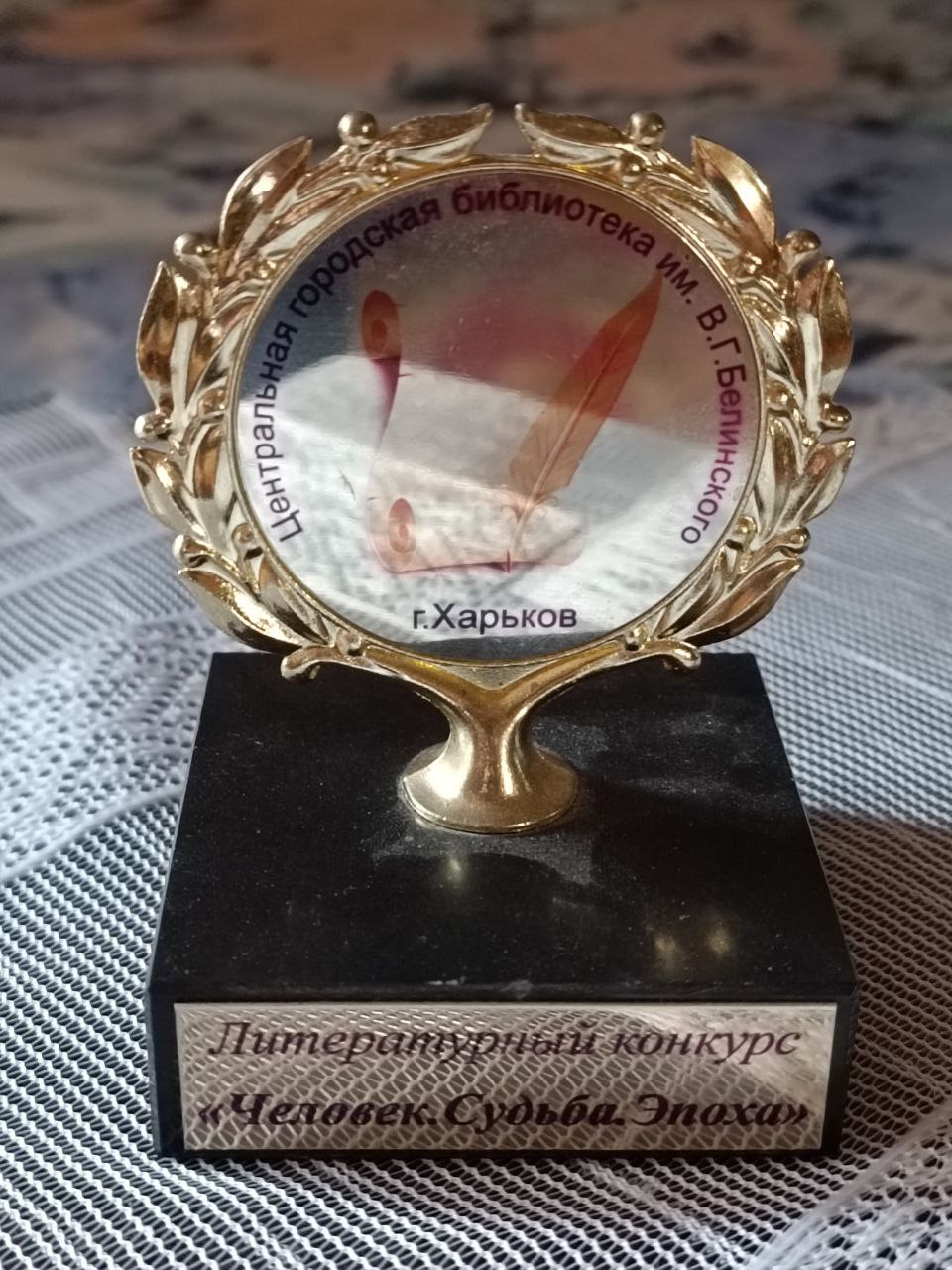
The award Yulii received in the «Human. Fate. Epoch» literary contest in Kharkiv.

The short story «The Wolf at the Outpost» depicts the inhabitants of a Soviet outpost in the taiga who took in a wolf cub. The reader is introduced to the daily life of the border guards against the backdrop of an unfolding conflict. In a review of this work, Carleton University professor R.K. Nazarkulova wrote, particularly, the following:

«... For several years, we lived in the Altai, precisely in the places you so vividly and lovingly described in your story. While reading it, I can clearly see the mountains, the steep, snow-covered trails; I hear the crunch of tightly packed frostbitten snow under the horse's hooves; I feel the sharp, biting breath of a fierce blizzard; I see ancient cedars, pines, and larches...»

His short stories and novellas have been published in magazines and online platforms in Ukraine, Russia, and Canada, including Privet Vancouver, S.A.M., Fliphtml5, Samlib, Litnet, Wattpad, Proza.ru, Litvek. Also, on the website of his grandson, dancer Vadim Garbuzov, there is a separate section with works by Yuliy. Since 2011, Yulii has been a member of the editorial board of the Kharkiv literary almanac Kharkiv Bridge, where his works have been regularly published since 2010. He was also a member of the Interregional Union of Writers of Ukraine, where he published his works, as well as the All-Ukrainian Creative Union Congress of Writers of Ukraine.

- He was awarded a diploma and a medal based on the results of the Rare Bird almanac festival.
- He took first prize in the Prose category of the «Human. Fate. Epoch» competition.

== Political, national and religious views ==
Yulii's eldest son described his views as follows:

«Above all, my father was an anti-communist and a Ukrainian patriot. Throughout my childhood, he listened to Western radio broadcasts on his old Spidola receiver. Later, I started listening too — he would let me use the radio. I remember stations like Voice of America, De Deutsche Welle (German Wave), and Radio Free Europe (Radio Liberty). Since the years of Perestroika, he mostly spoke Ukrainian with me and his grandson, Vadim, while continuing to speak Russian with my mother. His Ukrainian was quite advanced — I believe his knowledge of Polish helped. From him, I learned Polish songs and proverbs...»

Yulii Garbuzov was deeply affected by Russia's invasion of Ukraine in 2014. His socio-political views were based on conservative values and family traditions. Among religious denominations, he favored the Ukrainian Autocephalous Orthodox Church. Yulii considered his readership to be primarily Russian-speaking, which is why he wrote most of his works in Russian — to increase their popularity. According to his wife, he was one of the first to deliver university lectures in literary Ukrainian after the collapse of the USSR. Despite his strong political views, Yulii preferred to spend time at home, did not join political organizations, and did not engage in political activities.

== Open online publications ==
- Garbuzov, Yulii (7 March 2024). "Полное собрание сочинений" [Complete works]. Litnet (in Russian).
- Garbuzov, Yulii (20 April 2024). "Вселенские уравнения" [Universal equations]. Fliphtml5 (in Russian). p. 168.
- Garbuzov, Yulii (6 February 2013). "Байки деда Гордея" [Fables of grandfather Gordiy]. proza.ru (in Russian). p. 5.
- Garbuzov, Yulii (23 November 2007). "Волк на заставе" [A wolf on the outpost]. proza.ru (in Russian). p. 25.
- Garbuzov, Yulii (5 May 2014). "Колдовской туман" [Magic fog]. proza.ru (in Russian). p. 5.
- Garbuzov, Yulii (1 December 2007). "Красный рыцарь" [The Red Knight]. proza.ru (in Russian). p. 5.
- Garbuzov, Yulii (25 November 2007). "Огневик" [Fire spirit (Ognevik)]. proza.ru (in Russian). p. 17.
- Garbuzov, Yulii (23 November 2007). "Птичка" [Birdie]. proza.ru (in Russian). p. 46.
- Garbuzov, Yulii (22 August 2013). "Наследие Бога Нингирсу" [The legacy of the God of Ningirsu]. proza.ru (in Russian). p. 34.
- Garbuzov, Yulii (22 April 2024). "Жито и плевелы" [Rye and tares]. Fliphtml5 (in Russian). p. 402.
- Garbuzov, Yulii (23 November 2007). "Сила желания" [The power of desire]. proza.ru (in Russian). p. 15.
- Garbuzov, Yulii (23 April 2024). "Шлюз" [The gateway]. Fliphtml5 (in Russian). p. 261.
- Garbuzov, Yulii (24 April 2024). "История кафедры ОРТ" [History of the ORT Department]. Fliphtml5 (in Russian). p. 12.
- Garbuzov, Yulii (24 April 2024). "Достижения радиолокационных астрономических исследований метеоров в Харькове" [Achievements of radar astronomical research of meteors in Kharkiv]. Fliphtml5 (in Russian). p. 8.
- Garbuzov, Yulii (24 April 2024). "У подъезда" [Near the entrance]. Fliphtml5 (in Russian). p. 43.
- Garbuzov, Yulii (28 April 2024). "Цветы на даче" [Flowers at the cottage]. Fliphtml5 (in Russian). p. 55.

== Printed publications ==
- Garbuzov Yulii. Non-Invented Story (I editorial award). — St. Petersburg: «Kaleidoscope» Publishing, St. Petersburg, «UFO», № 6, 1999.
- Garbuzov Yulii. The power of desire. — Kharkiv: «Unknown world», № 5(27), 2001. — pp. 34–39.
- Garbuzov Yulii. The power of desire. — Kharkiv: Kharkiv Bridge. Literary almanac. Poetry and prose, № 6., 2012. — p. 131.
- Garbuzov Yulii. A night at the coffin with the dead. — Kharkiv: Kharkiv Bridge. Literary almanac. Poetry and prose, № 4. – Kharkiv: ООО «С.А.М.», 2010. — p. 122.
- Garbuzov Yulii. Der Wolf am Vorposten (I. readers choice award, «Privan», Canada). — Canada: «Privan», 2007. — p. 25.
- Garbuzov Yulii. Universal equations. — Kharkiv: Novels, short stories. – Kharkiv: «S.А.M.» JSC, 2012. — p. 462.
- Garbuzov Yulii. Book counter. — Kharkiv: Kharkiv Bridge. Literary almanac. Poetry and prose, № 9. – Kharkiv: Exclusive, 2015. — p. 127.
- Garbuzov Yulii. Book counter. — Dnipro, Literary web portal, «Rare bird», Dnipro, 2015.
- Garbuzov Yulii. The taste of halva. — Kharkiv: Kharkiv Bridge. Literary almanac. Poetry and prose, № 5. – Kharkiv: «S.А.M.» JSC, 2011. — p. 152.
- Garbuzov Yulii. Signature (A chapter from «Rye and tares»). — Kharkiv: Man. Destiny. Epoch... Literary almanac: Maidan, 2014. — pp. 16–19.
- Garbuzov Yulii. Fables of Old Gordey. — Kharkiv: Kharkiv Bridge. Literary almanac. Poetry and prose, № 7. – Kharkiv: Exclusive, 2013. — p. 123.
- Garbuzov Yulii. Magic fog. — Kharkiv: Kharkiv Bridge. Literary almanac. Poetry and prose, № 8. – Kharkiv: Exclusive, 2014. — p. 134.
- Garbuzov Yulii. Wild boar. — Kharkiv: Kharkiv Bridge. Literary almanac. Poetry and prose, № 10. – Kharkiv: Exclusive, 2016. — p. 138.
