= U-70 (synchrotron) =

Proton synchrotron in Russia

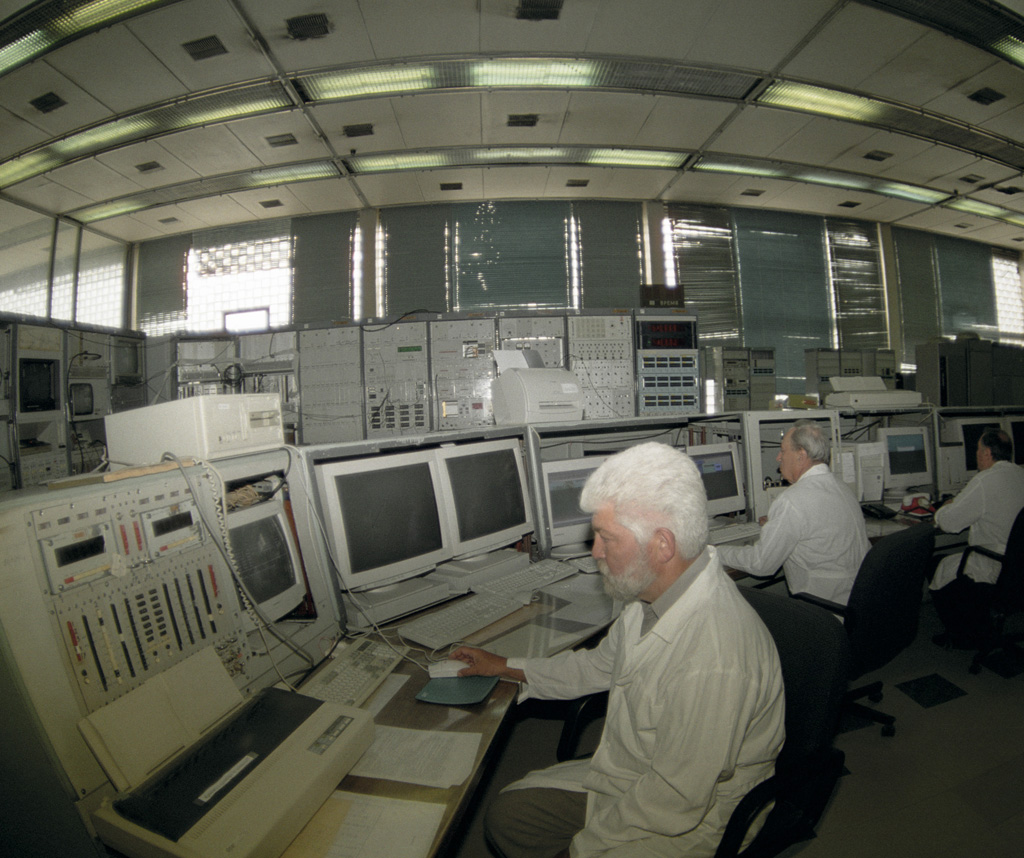
- View of the U-70 control room in 2001.

General properties
- Accelerator type: Synchrotron

Physical properties
- Location: Protvino, near Serpukhov, Russia
- Institution: Institute for High Energy Physics
- Dates of operation: 1967; 59 years ago – present

U-70 (Russian: У-70) is a proton synchrotron with a final energy of 70 GeV, built in 1967 at the Institute for High Energy Physics in Protvino (near Serpukhov, Russia). At the time of its construction, the accelerator held the world record for beam energy and is still the highest-energy accelerator in Russia.

In 1970, the U-70 scientists team was awarded the Lenin Prize for the development and commissioning of the synchrotron.

== Description of the accelerator complex ==
U-70 synchrotron main parameters
maximum proton energy, E_{max}	76 GeV
Injection energy, E_{min}	1.32 GeV
Perimeter, P	1483.63 m
Pulse repetition frequency	0.11 Hz
acceleration voltage (RF) frequency, f_{rf}	5.5-6.1 MHz
HF multiplicity (harmonic number)	30
Betatron tune, ν_{x} = ν_{y}	9.75-9.85
intensity of the beam of protons per pulse, N_{p}	1.7×10^{13}

The complex operates in a pulsed mode. Protons are accelerated to 30 MeV in the URAL-30 linear accelerator. Then they are injected into the fast-cyclic booster synchrotron U-1.5 having 100-m perimeter, where protons are accelerated to 1.32 GeV. Then the protons are injected to the U-70. After this, an acceleration cycle takes place for 9 seconds, when protons are accelerated to the maximum energy of 76 GeV, and then, they are extracted from the ring to the secondary beams in the experimental halls. U-70 has perimeter about 1.5 km. Focusing structure type is FODO (strong focusing). The total weight of the magnetic system of over 20 000 t.

The prior injection of U-70 was a 100 MeV linear accelerator I-100 (until 1985).

In the mid-1980s, a project was launched for the UNK proton accelerator storage complex, a proton-proton collider with an energy of 3 × 3 TeV. It was planned that U-70 would become an injector for the collider ring, but the project was cancelled due to the dissolution of the Soviet Union.

== Accident ==
In 1978, Soviet engineer Anatoli Bugorski stuck his head into a synchrotron to check malfunctioning equipment when the safety mechanism failed, exposing him to a 76 GeV proton beam. He reportedly saw "a flash brighter than a thousand suns" but felt no immediate pain. Though he survived, he suffered lifelong injuries, including radiation scarring, partial facial paralysis, hearing loss, and irregular epileptic seizures. Despite this, he completed his PhD and continued working. It has been suggested, though unconfirmed, that a proton current might taste sour.

== See also ==
- Abram Alikhanov
- Quadrupole magnet
- Strong focusing
