= Anatoly Logunov =

Russian physicist (1926–2015)

- Анатолий Алексеевич Логунов
- Born: 30 December 1926; Obsharovka village, Privolzhsky District, Samara Oblast, Russia
- Died: 1 March 2015 (aged 88); Moscow
- Resting place: Troyekurovskoye Cemetery, Moscow
- Citizenship: Soviet Union (1926–1991); Russia (1991–2015)
- Education: Moscow University
- Known for: the development relativistic theory of gravitation
- Scientific career
- Fields: (theoretical physics)
- Workplaces: Moscow University, JINR, IHEP, MIPT
- Academic advisors: Anatoly Vlasov, Nikolay Bogolyubov

Anatoly Alekseyevich Logunov (Russian: Анатолий Алексеевич Логунов; 30 December 1926 – 1 March 2015) was a Soviet and Russian theoretical physicist, academician of the USSR Academy of Sciences and Russian Academy of Sciences. He was awarded the Bogolyubov Prize in 1996.

== Biography ==
Anatoly Logunov was born in Obsharovka village, now in Privolzhsky District, Samara Oblast, Russia. In 1951 he graduated from Moscow University where he studied theoretical physics. From 1954 to 1956 he worked in Moscow University, later worked at Joint Institute for Nuclear Research (Dubna). He became doktor nauk in 1959 and professor in 1961. In 1968 he was elected a corresponding member of The Academy of Sciences of USSR. In 1971 the department of quantum theory and high energy physics was founded on faculty of physics of Moscow University. Anatoly Logunov was the head of this department right from the start at least until 2006. In 1972 Anatoly Logunov was elected an academician in the field of nuclear physics. From 1977 till 1992 he was the Rector of Moscow University. Anatoly Logunov died on 1 March 2015 in Moscow, Russia. He was buried at Troyekurovskoye Cemetery in Moscow.

== Research ==
Logunov made a notable contribution to elementary particle physics and quantum field theory. In 1956 he built generalized finite multiplicative renormalization groups and functional and differential renormalization group equations of electrodynamics in case of arbitrary calibration. Jointly with Piotr Isayev (Russian: Пётр Степанович Исаев), Lev Soloviov (Russian: Лев Дмитриевич Соловьев), Albert Tavkhelidze (Russian: Альберт Никифорович Тавхелидзе) and Ivan Todorov (Bulgarian: Иван Тодоров) et al. he derived dispersion relations for different processes of elementary particle interactions, among them the processes of photobirth of $\pi$-mesons in nucleons. He studied Bell's spaceship paradox, the ideas of Henri Poincaré.

=== Relativistic theory of gravitation ===
After studying works of Poincare, Lorentz, Hilbert and Einstein in great detail, Logunov and his colleagues developed the relativistic theory of gravitation (RTG), a theory of gravitation alternative to that of the general theory of relativity. RTG is constructed in the framework of the special theory of relativity. It asserts that gravitational field, like all other physical fields, develops in Minkowski space, while the source of this field is the conserved energy-momentum tensor of matter, including the gravitational field itself. This approach permits constructing, in a unique and unambiguous manner, the theory of gravitational field as a gauge theory. Here, there arises an effective Riemannian space, which literally has a field nature. Unlike General Relativity (GR), according to which space is considered to be Riemannian owing to presence of matter and gravity is considered a consequence of space-time exhibiting curvature, the RTG gravitational field has spins 2 and 0 and represents a physical field in Faraday-Maxwell spirit. In RTG, unlike GR, the energy-momentum and the angular momentum conservation laws are fulfilled. Moreover, analyses of the development of a homogeneous and isotropic Universe within RTG leads to the conclusion that the Universe is infinite, and that it is "flat". It evolves cyclically from a certain maximum density down to a minimum and so on. Thus, no pointlike Big Bang occurred in the past. There existed a state of high density and high temperature at each point in space. The theory also predicts the existence in the Universe of a large hidden mass of "dark matter" and impossibility of infinite gravitational collapse (no black holes).

== Positions ==
- Director of the Institute for High Energy Physics (1963—1974 and 1993—2003)
- Scientific director of the Institute for High Energy Physics (1974–2015)
- Vice-president of Academy of Sciences of USSR (26 November 1974–19 December 1991)
- Rector of Moscow State University (1977—1992)
- Deputy of the USSR Supreme Soviet (1979–1989)
- Candidate member of the CPSU Central Committee (1981–1986)
- Member of the CPSU Central Committee (1986)
- Head of editorial board of a series "Materials to bibliography of scientists (Russian: "Материалы к библиографии ученых")

== Awards and recognition ==
=== Orders and medals ===
The incomplete list follows.

- Hero of Socialist Labour (1980)
- Order "For Merit to the Fatherland" (2nd degree, 2002)
- Order "For Merit to the Fatherland" (3rd degree, 1995)
- Order of Lenin (1971, 1975, 1986)
- Order of the Badge of Honour (1962)
- Jubilee Medal "In Commemoration of the 100th Anniversary of the Birth of Vladimir Ilyich Lenin" (1970)

=== Prizes ===
- Lenin Prize (1970)
- USSR State Prize in the field of engineering (1973, 1974)
- Bogolyubov Prize (1996)
- Russian Federation Presidential Certificate of Honour (2012)

Anatoly Logunov was elected a doctor emeritus of Humboldt University of Berlin, Comenius University in Bratislava, University of Havana, Charles University in Prague, Sofia University, University of Helsinki and a number of universities of Japan, full professor of Department of theorerical physics of Institute of Fundamental Research (Molise, Italy). He is a foreign member of Academy of sciences of Bulgaria (1978), Academy of sciences of Eastern Germany (1978), Academy of sciences of Georgia (1996).

== Works ==
- A. A. Logunov (2001). The Theory of Gravity. Moscow: Nauka. p. 255. ISBN 978-5-02-022699-9.
- Logunov, A. A. (2002). "The Theory of Gravity". arXiv:gr-qc/0210005.
- N. N. Bogoliubov; A. A. Logunov; I. T. Todorov (1975). Introduction to Axiomatic Quantum Field Theory. Reading. Mass.: W. A. Benjamin, Advanced Book Program. ISBN 978-0-8053-0982-9..
- Bogolubov, N.N., Logunov, A.A., Oksak, A.I., Todorov, I. (1990) General Principles of Quantum Field Theory.
