= Andrei Garbuzov (footballer) =

Russian footballer

Personal information
- Full name: Andrei Nikolayevich Garbuzov
- Date of birth: 13 February 1984 (age 42)
- Place of birth: Pskov, Russian SFSR
- Height: 1.89 m (6 ft 2 1/2 in)
- Positions: Midfielder; defender

Senior career*
| Years | Team | Apps | (Gls) |
| 2002–2003 | FC Pskov-2000 | 43 | (0) |
| 2003 | FC Fakel-Voronezh Voronezh | 2 | (0) |
| 2004–2005 | FC Pskov-2000 | 34 | (0) |
| 2005 | FC Sheksna Cherepovets | 7 | (0) |
| 2006 | FC Sever Murmansk (D4) | | |
| 2007 | FC Pskov-747 (D4) | | |
| 2008 | FC Volgar-Gazprom Astrakhan | 0 | (0) |
| 2008 | FC Energetik Uren | 17 | (2) |
| 2009–2010 | FC Dynamo St. Petersburg | 43 | (4) |
| 2010 | FC Sheksna Cherepovets | 15 | (2) |
| 2011 | FC Pskov-747 Pskov | 7 | (0) |
| 2011–2012 | FC Sheksna Cherepovets | 24 | (3) |
- * Club domestic league appearances and goals

Andrei Nikolayevich Garbuzov (Russian: Андрей Николаевич Гарбузов; born 13 February 1984) is a former Russian professional football player.

== Club career ==
He played two seasons in the Russian Football National League for FC Fakel Voronezh and FC Dynamo Saint Petersburg.
