= Theoretical and Mathematical Physics =

- Discipline: mathematical aspects of quantum mechanics, quantum field theory, statistical physics, supersymmetry, and integrable models (in any areas of physics)
- Language: English
- Edited by: Dmitri I. Kazakov

Publication details
- History: 1969–Present
- Publisher: Russian Academy of Sciences (Russia)
- Frequency: monthly
- Open access: Hybrid
- Impact factor: 1.0 (2023)

Standard abbreviations
- ISO 4: Theor. Math. Phys.
- MathSciNet: Theoret. and Math. Phys.

Indexing
- ISSN: 0040-5779 (print); 1573-9333 (web)

Links
- Journal homepage; At Springer

Theoretical and Mathematical Physics (Russian: Теоретическая и Математическая Физика) is a Russian scientific journal. It was founded in 1969 by Nikolai Bogolubov. Currently handled by the Russian Academy of Sciences, it appears in 12 issues per year. The journal publishes papers on mathematical aspects of quantum mechanics, quantum field theory, statistical physics, supersymmetry, and integrable models (in any areas of physics).

The editor-in-chief is Dmitri I. Kazakov (Institute for Nuclear Research). According to the Journal Citation Reports, the journal has a 2023 impact factor of 1.0.
