= Institute for High Energy Physics =

Russian physics research institute

- Институт физики высоких энергий

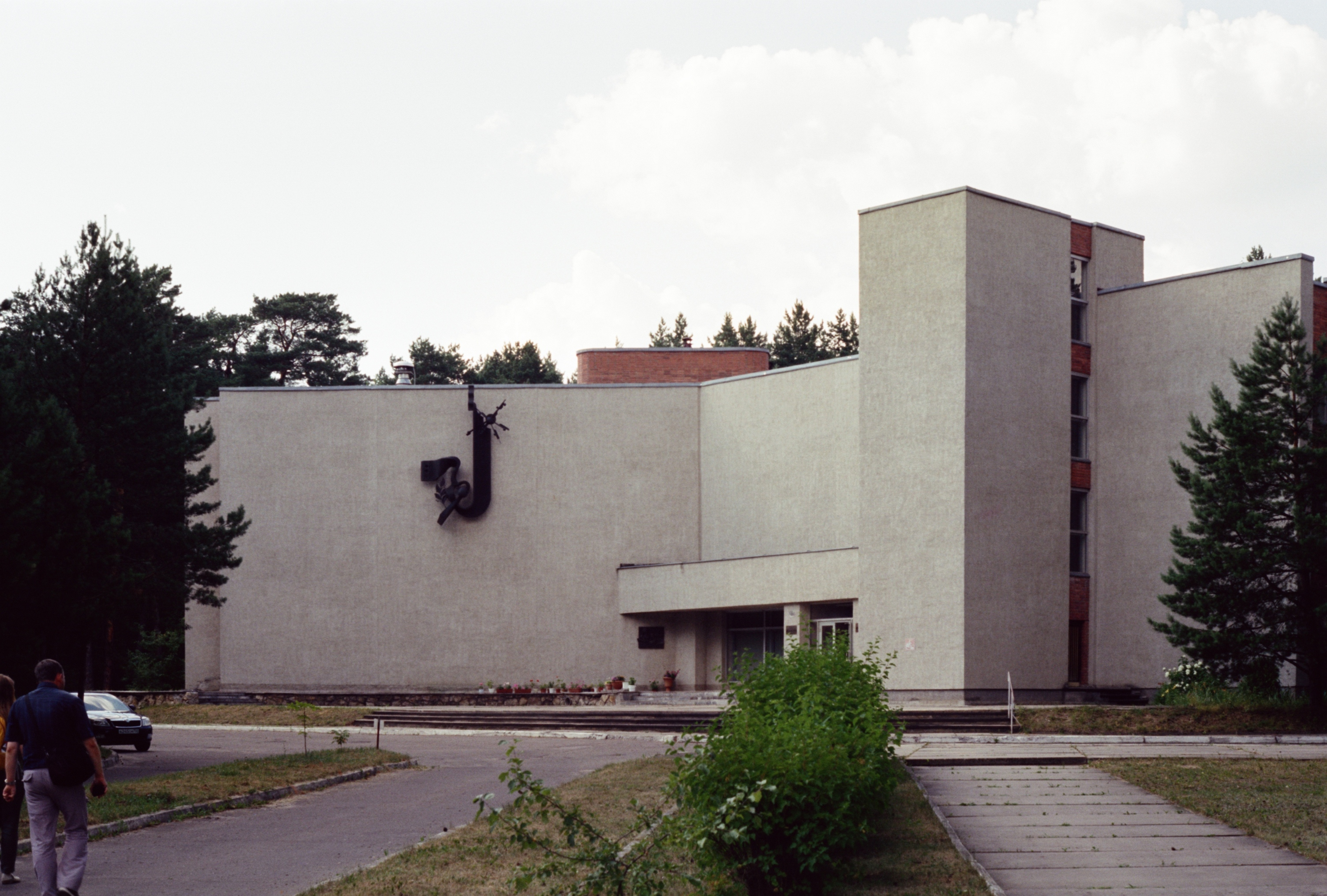
- Established: 1963
- Research type: High energy physics and particle physics
- Director: Professor Nikolai E. Tyurin
- Location: Protvino, Russia; 54.8678°N 37.2030°E
- Website: www.ihep.ru

State Research Center – Institute for High Energy Physics (Russian: Институт физики высоких энергий) (known in its acronym IHEP) is a research organisation in Protvino (near Moscow, Moscow Oblast), Russia. It was established in 1963.

IHEP signed an agreement concerning scientific and technical co-operation between CERN and the State Committee of the USSR on the Utilization of Atomic Energy in 1967. CERN director-generals Victor Weisskopf and Bernard Gregory played a central role in establishing IHEP's international collaboration with CERN.

The institute is known for the particle accelerator U-70 synchrotron launched in 1967 with the maximum proton energy of 70 GeV, which had the largest proton energy in the world for five years.

The first director of the institute from 1963 to 1974 was Anatoly Logunov. From 1974 to 1993, professor Lev Solovyov (Russian: Лев Дмитриевич Соловьев) served as the director of the institute. A professor, Nikolai E. Tyurin has been the director of the institute since 2003.

In 1978, a scientist of the institute, Anatoli Bugorski, was irradiated by an extreme dose of proton beam. His demise was deemed inevitable as the doctors believed he had received a dosage far in excess of what could be considered fatal. However, he survived the accident and continued to work in the institute.

In 2022, the institute was put onto the US and EU sanction lists in the context of Russian invasion of Ukraine.

== See also ==
- UNK proton accelerator, a powerful accelerator that was planned to be built at Protvino but was not built after the collapse of the Soviet Union
- Budker Institute of Nuclear Physics, another Russian particle physics laboratory in Novosibirsk
- Institute for Theoretical and Experimental Physics, another Russian particle physics laboratory in the vicinity of Moscow; located in Moscow proper
- Joint Institute for Nuclear Research, international particle physics laboratory in the vicinity of Moscow; located north of Moscow
- OKA (experiment)
