= Protvino =

Town in Moscow Oblast, Russia

Protvino Протвино
- Town
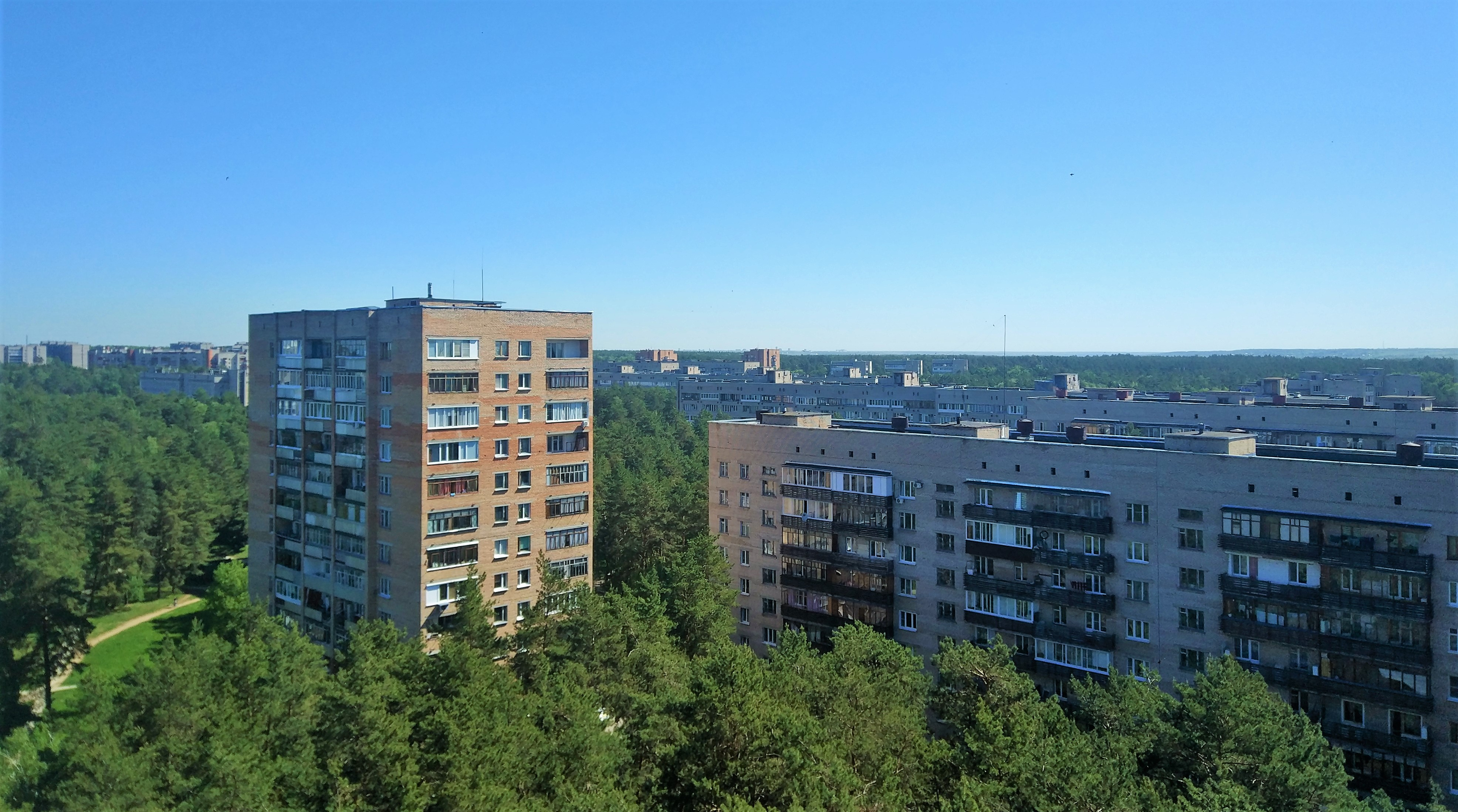

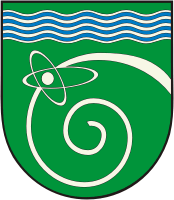
- Flag Coat of arms
- Interactive map of Protvino
- Location of Protvino Protvino (Moscow Oblast)
- Coordinates: 54°53′N 37°13′E
- Country: Russia
- Federal subject: Moscow Oblast
- Founded: 1960
- Town status since: 1989
- Elevation: 140 m (460 ft)

Population (2010 Census)
  - Total: 37,308
  - Estimate (2025): 37,270 (−0.1%)

Administrative status
  - Subordinated to: Protvino Town Under Oblast Jurisdiction
  - Capital of: Protvino Town Under Oblast Jurisdiction

Municipal status
  - Urban okrug: Protvino Urban Okrug
  - Capital of: Protvino Urban Okrug
- Time zone: UTC+3 (MSK)
- Postal codes: 142280, 142281
- OKTMO ID: 46770000006
- Website: www.protvino.ru

Protvino (Russian: Протвино) is a town in Moscow Oblast, Russia, located about 100 kilometers (62 mi) south of Moscow and 15 kilometers (9.3 mi) west of Serpukhov, on the left bank of the Protva River. Population: 37,308 (2010 census); 36,175 (2002 census); 34,520 (1989 Soviet census).

== History ==
Construction of an urban-type settlement intended to house a large high energy physics research laboratory started in 1958, and the Rosatom Institute for High Energy Physics was opened here in 1965. The institute is known for the 70 GeV proton accelerator which was the largest in the world at the time it was launched in 1967, and other physics research. Town status was granted in 1989. The UNK Collider was the last big planned particle accelerator.

Among the discoveries made at IHEP are that of antihelium and the Serpukhov cross-section effect.

== Administrative and municipal status ==
Within the framework of administrative divisions, it is incorporated as Protvino Town Under Oblast Jurisdiction—an administrative unit with the status equal to that of the districts. As a municipal division, Protvino Town Under Oblast Jurisdiction is incorporated as Protvino Urban Okrug.

== Transport ==
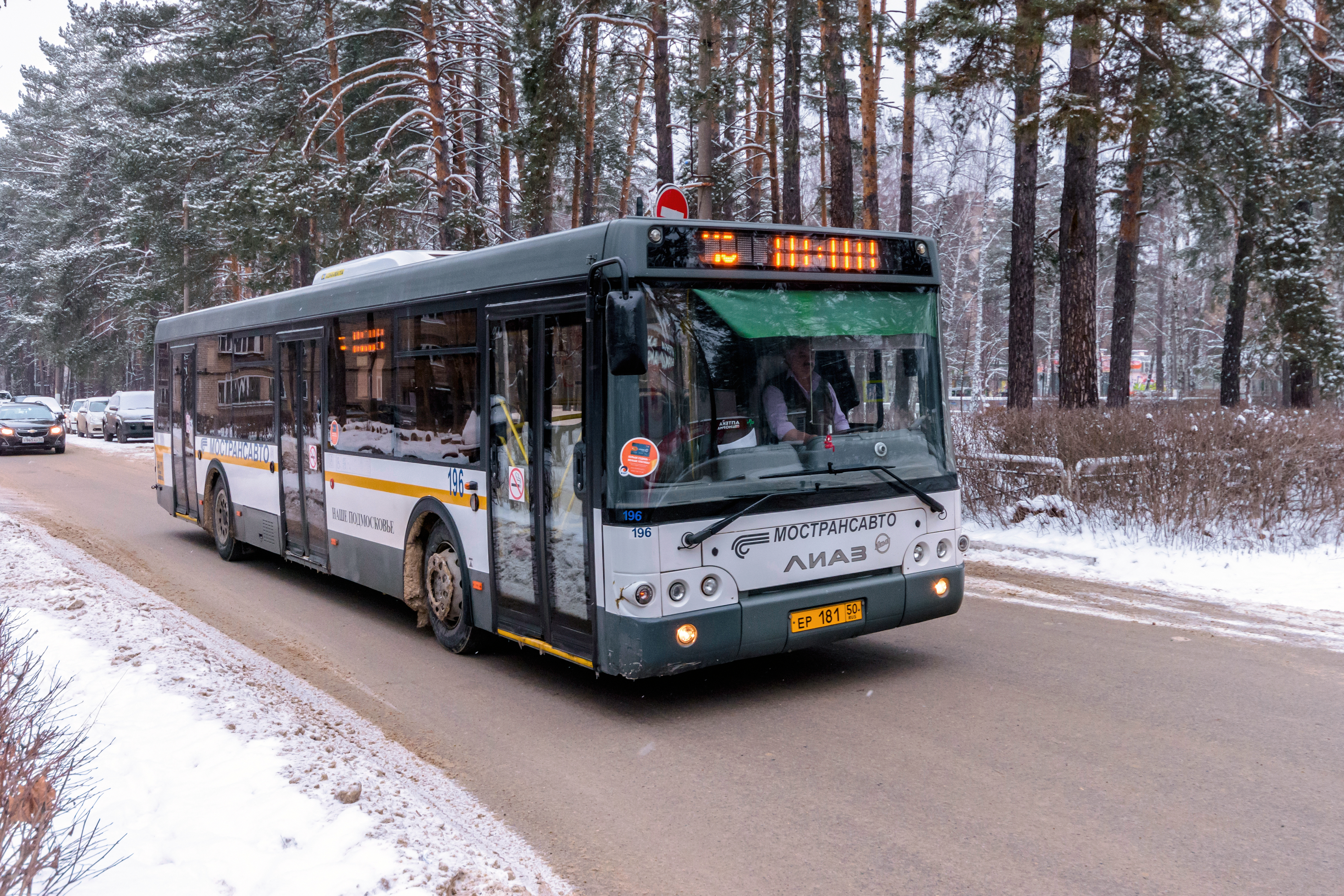
LiAZ-5292 low-floor bus

In the city the Protvino railroad station is located, although it is only used for cargo transport. Public transport is provided by buses.

== Twin towns – sister cities ==
Protvino is twinned with:

- Antony, France
- Bowling Green, United States
- Gomel, Belarus
- Lahoysk, Belarus
- Milan, United States
- Somero, Finland

== Notable people ==
- Nixelpixel (born 1993), feminist and cyber activist
- Vitali Yelsukov (born 1973), football player
- Anatoli Bugorski (born 1942), survivor of a particle accelerator accident
- Кузнецова Инга (born 1974), surrealist poet and writer
