= Volga Tatar nationalism =

Belief that Tatars should constitute an independent nation

Flag used by Tatar nationalists

Volga Tatar nationalism is the belief that Tatars should constitute an independent nation. Finding historical basis in the Khanate of Kazan and Russian–Tatar enmities, Tatar nationalism has often synthesised Islam as a national aspect. Tatar nationalism has historically manifested itself as the Idel-Ural State, as well as the Declaration of State Sovereignty of Tatarstan and the country's period of de facto independence from Russia in the early 1990s.

== Origins ==
Tatar nationalism has been cited by historian Sergei Kondrashov as having two historical causes: Firstly is the Mongol invasion of Kievan Rus' and the subsequent "Mongolo-Tatar domination of Russia". Secondly is the Khanate of Kazan and its subjugation during the Russo-Kazan Wars. Tatar nationalism has also been divided between two schools of thought, known as "Bulgarists" and "Tatarists". The Bulgarists place Volga Bulgaria as the historical origins of modern-day Tatarstan, with the Golden Horde being a foreign, but culturally influential occupying power. The Tatarists, on the other hand, regard Volga Bulgaria and the Golden Horde as equal ancestors of present-day Tatars.

After the Russian conquest of Central Asia, Tatarstan, much like other Muslim-majority nations within the Russian Empire, was conflicted between struggles of ethnic and religious nationalism. Historically, much like other religiously-Islamic ethnic groups within the Empire, Tatars described themselves primarily as Muslims rather than aligning themselves with an ethnic or linguistic identity. This was opposed by Şihabetdin Märcani, among others, who argued in favour of a Tatar ethnic identity. Prior to the Russian Revolution, Tatar activists such as Gabdulla Apanayev organised largely within the Union of the Muslims of Russia. Tatar nationalism at this time was influenced by the progressively-minded Jadid movement, which sought to fuse Islam and western innovations in regards to education and other similar topics.

== Russian Revolution and the Soviet Union ==
Tatar nationalists in the Russian Revolution

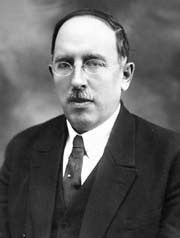
Sadri Maksudi Arsal, leader of the anti-communist Idel-Ural State

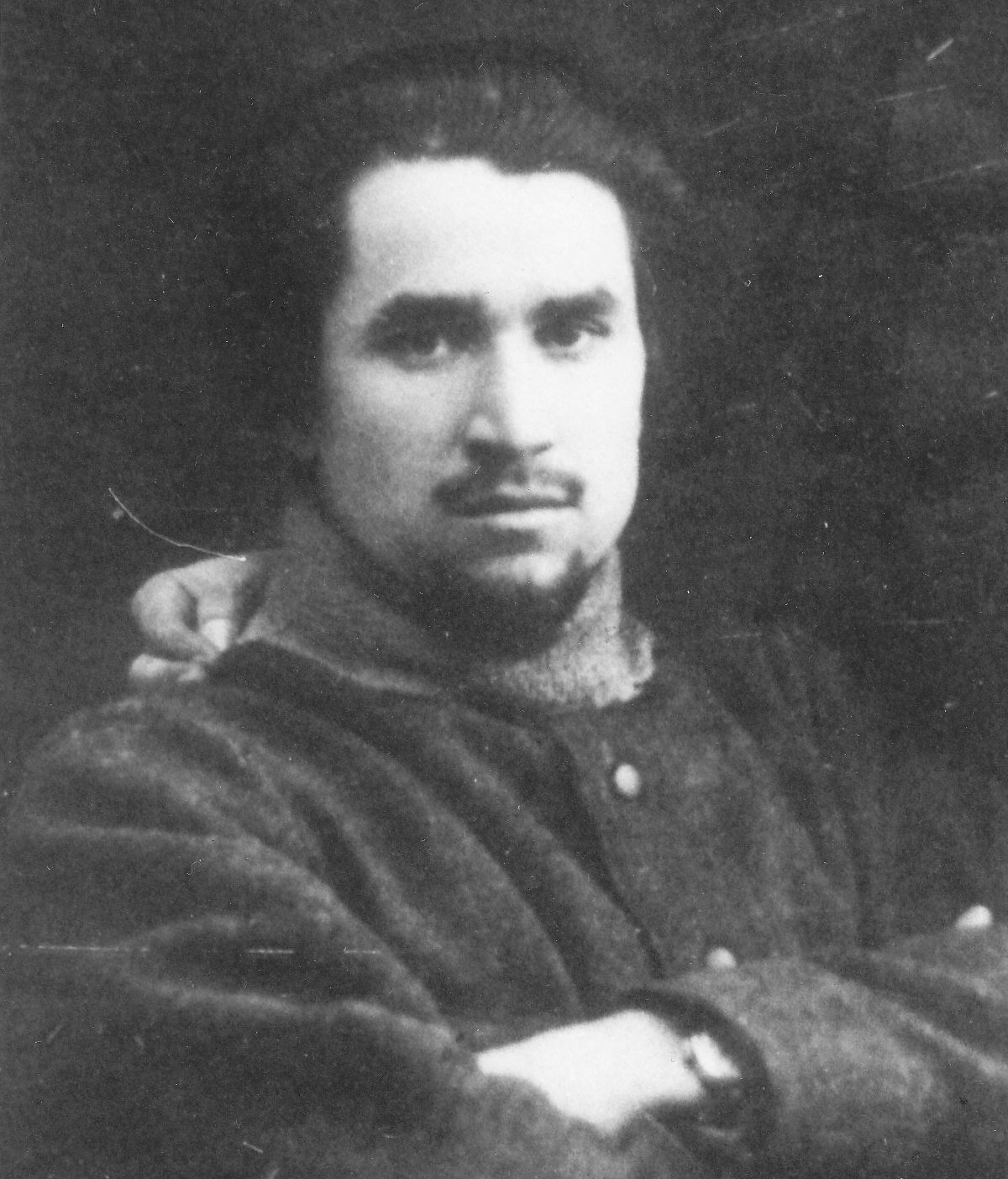
Mirsaid Sultan-Galiev, leader of Tatar national communists in the Soviet Union

The Russian Revolution and the subsequent Russian Civil War led to major changes in the development of Tatar nationalism. The Idel-Ural State was created in part to represent Tatars, though it lasted only 28 days before being defeated by the Red Army. Anti-communist nationalists like Apanayev were executed. After the civil war, a group of Muslim national communists emerged under the leadership of Tatar Mirsaid Sultan-Galiev. Beginning in the 1920s, they were steadily removed from power as part of simultaneous purges of Ukrainian, Central Asian, and Tatar national communists.

The Tatar diaspora, including sizeable communities in Germany, Turkey, and China, was indignant to Soviet government as a whole, and some members such as Ayaz İshaki called for the establishment of an independent Tatar state based on Idel-Ural. This advocacy further incited Soviet paranoia, and, during the Great Purge, many Tatars were imprisoned on charges of association with either Sultan-Galiev or İshaki. As a result of the Great Purge, most of Tatarstan's urban intelligentsia was arrested, exiled, or executed by the outbreak of World War II. Tatarstan's major cities were Russified.

=== World War II ===
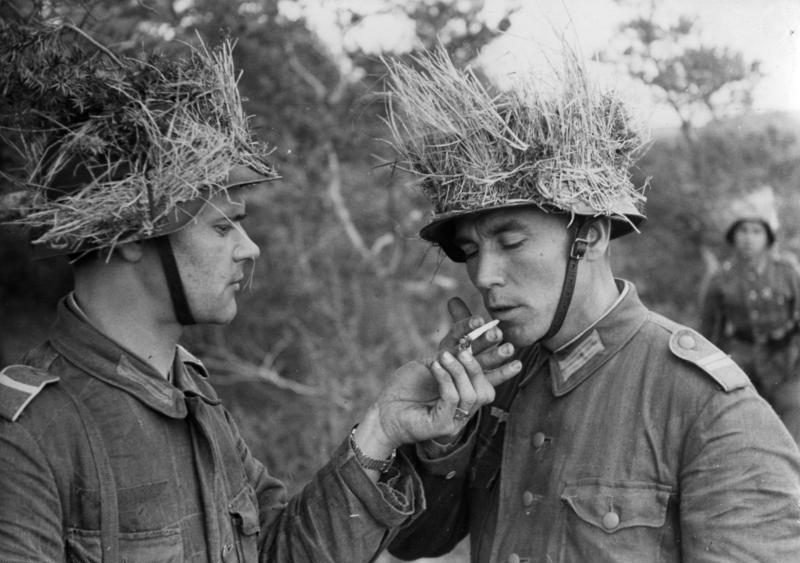
Tatar soldiers in the Wehrmacht, 1942

After military setbacks during Operation Barbarossa and protests by the government of Turkey on the treatment of Muslim Soviet prisoners of war, Nazi Germany organised the Idel Ural Legion in 1942. Comprising Tatars as well as other ethnicities within the Idel-Ural region, the Idel Ural Legion included some Tatar nationalists and was stated in German propaganda leaflets to be aimed at the restoration of the Idel-Ural State as independent from the Soviet Union. Most of its members, in addition to their status as prisoners of war, also stated different reasons for joining, such as anti-Russian sentiment, opposition to collective farming, anti-communism, and their families' religion. At the time, members of the Legion did not view themselves as belonging to separate ethnic groups, instead consisting as part of one singular unit. This manifestation of Tatar nationalism did not include its interwar-era leaders, such as İshaki, who, like many of his peers, was viewed with suspicion by the German government and sidelined.

At the same time, Tatars also fought for the Soviet Union and became national heroes. Musa Cälil and his Cälil Group, while part of the Idel-Ural Legion, covertly resisted Germany and later defected back to Soviet forces. Cälil was posthumously awarded the title of Hero of the Soviet Union for his military activities, as well as the Lenin Prize for his Moabit Notebook, at the urging of Tatar intelligentsia.

=== Tatar dissidents ===
Dissidents such as Salix Battal argued for the Tatar ASSR (flag pictured) to become a fully-fledged republic of the Soviet Union

Unlike many other nationalities within the Soviet Union, such as Crimean Tatars and Ukrainians, Volga Tatars lacked a similarly well-organised and substantial dissident movement after World War II. However, there were notable events of dissent among Tatars, such as Salix Battal's 1961 poem Letter of Batu Khan and calls to upgrade the Tatar Autonomous Soviet Socialist Republic to the status of a union republic. In response to Battal's proposal, he was removed from the Communist Party of the Soviet Union. A six-member dissident group, known to the KGB as the "Aydeldinov Group", included Nurixan Fättax, Fuat Väliev, Gabdulla Şamukov and Fajeq Möxemetjenov, and was known to argue for nationalistic viewpoints.

== Independent Tatarstan (1990–1994) ==
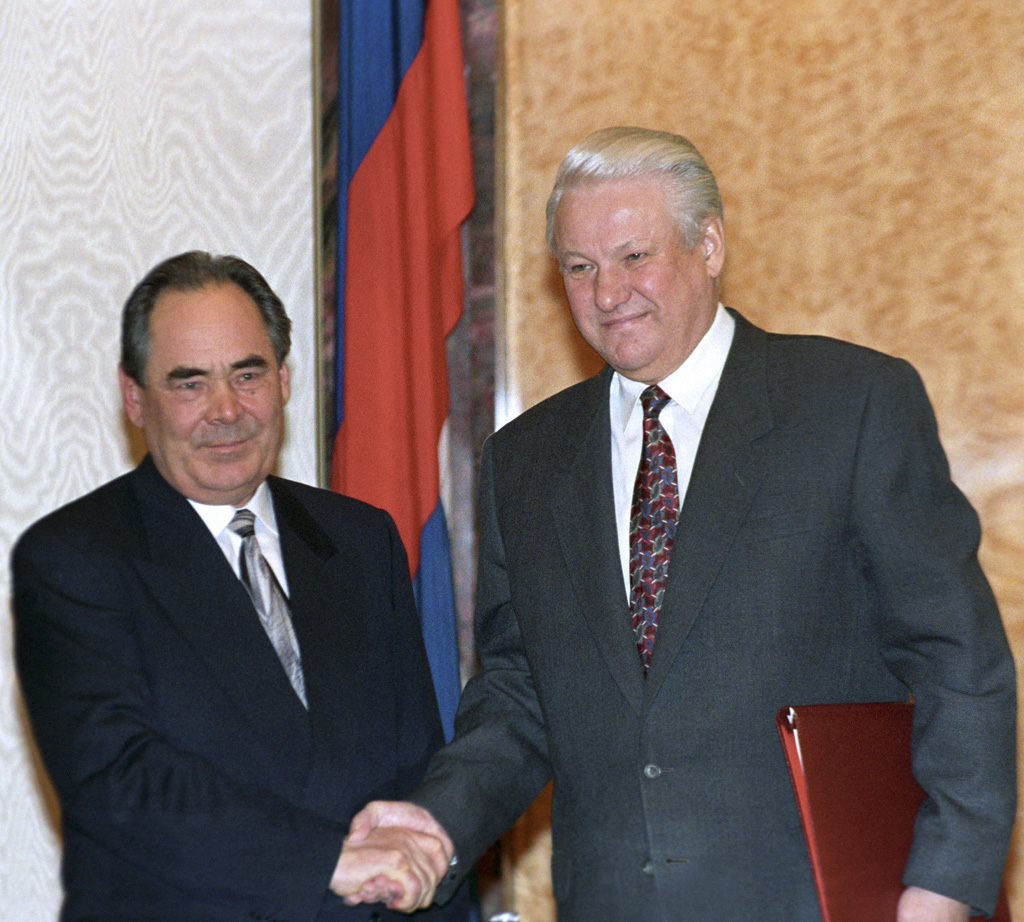
Tatar president Mintimer Shaimiev and Russian president Boris Yeltsin shaking hands, 1994

Amidst the dissolution of the Soviet Union, Tatar political leaders sought to establish themselves as separate from Russia. The Declaration of State Sovereignty of Tatarstan, passed on 24 October 1990, defined Tatarstan as a sovereign state within the Soviet Union. When the Soviet Union dissolved, Tatarstan found itself in a state of de facto independence, something which Tatar leaders sought to strengthen with a 1992 sovereignty referendum and a wide-reaching nation-building exercise. The Tatar language and Islamic education were publicly revived, while the Kul Sharif Mosque began being rebuilt. Tatar nationalism at this time split between moderate and radical camps. The radical Ittifaq Party, led by Fauziya Bayramova, expressly opposed Jadid, Sufism, and European Islam, promoting strong anti-Russian sentiment and an Islamic Tatarstan. The moderate All-Tatar Public Center, on the other hand, was primarily concerned with Tatar independence as opposed to religious matters.

Ultimately, Tatarstan signed a power-sharing agreement with the Russian government in 1994. As part of the agreement, Tatarstan received significant powers, which were later granted to other republics in a system of asymmetric federalism.

== Since 1994 ==
With Vladimir Putin's accession to the Russian presidency in 2000, Tatarstan's powers have since been significantly eroded as part of a process of centralisation. Nonetheless, Tatar nationalism has remained a significant part of political life, primarily in opposition to perceived Russian Tatarophobia. Tatar nationalism has also, on occasion, come into conflict with Russians, such as during a 2011 protest regarding Russia's status within Tatarstan.
