= Äxmät İsxaq =

Soviet-Tatar writer

- Әхмәт Исхак
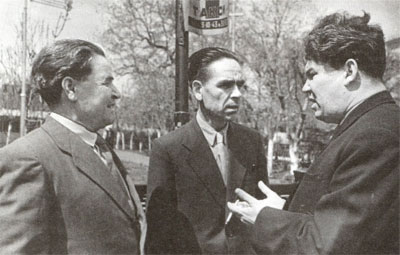
- İsxaq (center) with fellow writers Fatix Xösni and Mustai Karim (c. 1960)
- Born: Äxmät Ğabdulla ulı İsxaq; 1 May [O.S. 18 April] 1905; Kazan, Kazan Governorate, Russian Empire
- Died: June 24, 1991 (aged 86); Kazan, Tatar SSR, Soviet Union
- Burial place: Novo-Tatar Cemetery, Kazan, Tatarstan, Russia
- Occupations: Writer; translator; journalist.
- Spouse: Zäynäp Ğosmanova
- Awards: Order of the Red Banner of Labour (1955); Order of Friendship of Peoples (1970); Medal "For the Victory over Germany in the Great Patriotic War 1941–1945" (1945)

Äxmät İsxaq (Note: Tatar: Әхмәт Исхак (احمد اسحاق), pronounced [æχˈmæt isˈχaq]; Russian: Ахмет Исхак, romanized: Akhmet Iskhak) (1905–1991) was a Soviet Tatar poet, translator and journalist.

== Biography ==
Äxmät İsxaq was born 1 May [O.S. 18 April] 1905 in Kazan. He received his professional education at the Möxämmädiä madrasa and the Tatar Pedagogical Institute in Kazan, before starting work in the editorial office of the Tatar Regional Committee of Komsomol.

In 1925, he was sent to Moscow to study at the State Film School, but he soon joined the editorial office of the Tatar-language newspaper Eşçe (Эшче; The Worker) where he met the Tatar writers Musa Cälil and Kavi Najmi. In 1928, he returned to Kazan and began working for other Tatar-language publications, including the newspaper Qızıl Tatarstan (Кызыл Татарстан; Red Tatarstan) and the satirical magazine Çayan (Чаян; Scorpion).

In 1939, he became head of the Tatar ASSR branch of the Union of Soviet Writers, a position he held until 1942. In 1942, during World War II, İsxaq enlisted in the Soviet Army and served as a platoon commander and a military journalist first in the Russian Far East and then in Ukraine. After the war, he worked for the newspaper Vatan çaqıra (Ватан чакыра; The Motherland Calls) before becoming chief editor of Çayan in 1963 a position he held through 1969. At Çayan, he wrote under the pen name Qarəxmətne (Карәхмәтне).

== Works ==
During his lifetime, İsxaq published some 40 books in Tatar, Russian, and Bashkir, including poetry, satirical works, fairy tales, opera librettos, reviews and critiques, and other works. He is also known for his translations of Russian classical poets and Tatar and Turkic poetry.

His first literary work, a poem called "Qızıl qoşlar" (Кызыл кошлар; Red Birds), was published in 1923 in the journal Qızıl Şäreq yäşläre (Кызыл Шәрекъ яшьләре; The Youth of the Red East). He later published several collections of poems, including Taş uramnar cırı (Таш урамнар җыры; Song of the Streets of Stone) in 1929, Bäxet turında cır (Бәхет турныда җыр; Song of Happiness) in 1939, Quray (Курай; Quray) in 1946, and Cırda oçraşu (Җырда очрашу; Meeting in Song) in 1957. İsxaq also engaged in literary criticism and analysis, writing books about the work of Musa Cälil and Ğabdulla Tuqay.

İsxaq translated the works of Ali-Shir Nava'i, Abai Qunanbaiuly, Mahtumkuli, Alexander Pushkin, Mikhail Lermontov, and Vladimir Mayakovsky into Tatar, along with translations of the Old Tatar poet Qol Ğäli into modern Tatar. He also contributed to Tatar musical culture, including writing the libretto for an opera based on Ğomär Bäşirov's 1948 novel Namusı (Намусы; Honor) and translating other librettos, songs, and musical passages into Tatar, including a translation of the State Anthem of the Soviet Union.

== Family ==
Äxmät İsxaq was married to Zäynäp Ğosmanova (Зәйнәп Госманова), whose sister was married to Tatarstan politician Şahwäil Başkirof. The couple had two sons, İrşat (Иршат) and İlik (Илик).

== Selected works ==
- Taş uramnar cırı Таш урамнар җыры (1929) (Song of the Streets of Stone)
- Bäxet turında cır Бәхет турында җыр (1939) (Song of Happiness)
- Quray Курай (1946) (Quray)
- Поэт–герой Муса Җәлил (1956) (Poet–Hero Musa Cälil) (in Russian)
- Cırda oçraşu Җырда очрашу (1957) (Meeting in Song)
- Tuqaynıñ şiğri ostalığı Тукайның шигъри осталыгы (1963) (Tuqay's Poetic Skills)
- Uylanular, yılmayular Уйланулар, елмаюлар (1983) (Thoughts, Smiles)
