= Boris Khaikin =

Soviet conductor (1904–1978)

Boris Khaikin Барыс Хайкін
- Born: 26 October [O.S. 13 October] 1904; Minsk, Russian Empire (present-day Belarus)
- Died: 10 May 1978 (aged 73) Moscow, Russian SFSR, Soviet Union
- Genres: Classical
- Occupation: Conductor

Boris Emmanuilovich Khaikin (Note: Belarusian: Барыс Эмануілавіч Хайкін, romanized: Barys Emanuilavich Khaykin Russian: Борис Эммануилович Хайкин, romanized: Boris Emmanuilovich Khaykin Sometimes romanized as Khajkin and Chaikin.) (26 October [O.S. 13 October] 1904 – 10 May 1978) was a Soviet conductor who was named a People's Artist of the USSR in 1972.

== Biography ==
Khaikin was born in Minsk, then part of the Russian Empire. He studied at the Moscow Conservatory under Nicolai Malko and Konstantin Saradzhev. He was artistic director of the Little Leningrad Opera Theatre from 1936 until 1943 and the principal conductor at the Kirov Theatre from 1944 until 1953, where he conducted the première of Sergei Prokofiev's Betrothal in a Monastery on 3 November 1946. He moved to the Bolshoi Theatre in 1954.

He died in Moscow, and was buried in the Donskoye Cemetery.

== Discography ==
Khaikin is noted for his two critically acclaimed recordings of Khovanshchina: a 1946 edition with Mark Reizen, and a 1972 version with Irina Arkhipova. His record of Nikolai Rimsky-Korsakov's little known early first symphony received good notices. Khaikin also recorded several operas and ballets by Pyotr Ilyich Tchaikovsky, notably a Eugene Onegin with Galina Vishnevskaya and Sergei Lemeshev.

Other opera recordings include:

- Mikhail Glinka; A Life for the Tsar (in the Ivan Susanin version), 1960
- Alexander Dargomyzhsky; Stone Guest with the USSR Radio Chorus and Symphony, 1959
- Anton Rubinstein; The Demon
- Kirill Molchanov; The Unknown Soldier
- Näcip Cihanov; Musa Dzhalil (opera-poem based on the life of Soviet Tatar poet Musa Cälil) It is not clear whether Khaikin recorded the opera in the original Tatar version of 1957, or in Russian translation.
- Vlasov and Fere; The Witch (based on the story by Chekhov).

== Awards ==
- Stalin Prize first degree (1946)
- Two Stalin Prizes second degree (1946, 1951)
- People's Artist of the USSR (1972)
