= Tamurbek Dawletschin =

Soviet writer (1904–1983)

Tamurbek Dinmukhametovich Dawletschin
- Тамурбек Динмухаметович Давлетшин
- Born: 16 May 1904; Zildyar, Ufa Governorate, Russian Empire
- Died: 7 September 1983 (aged 79); Munich, Bavaria, West Germany
- Occupation: Writer

Tamurbek Dawletschin (also spelled Timurbäk Däwlätşin, 26 May 1904 – 7 September 1983) was a Soviet writer and intellectual, best known for publishing one of the few memoirs by a Soviet prisoner of war held by Germany during World War II.

Dawletschin was born in the rural village of Sildjär in Bashkortostan in 1904 and grew up in a Muslim environment. He studied law and economics and became a professor at the University of Kazan. During World War II, he was drafted in to the Red Army as a lieutenant. Two months later, he was captured by German forces in September 1941 near Novgorod. He spent several months detained in different camps for Soviet prisoners of war, traveling from Porchow to Riga and Pogegen near Tilsit in East Prussia to Fallingbostel before being transferred to Stalag XI-C, adjacent to Bergen-Belsen concentration camp, in February 1942. His memoirs shed light on the conditions encountered at the camps, behavior of prisoners and guards, survival strategies, and the hierarchies and social relations that existed in the camps. Although more than 5 million Soviet prisoners were captured and around 3 million died in captivity, having been a prisoner was viewed with suspicion, leading survivors in the Soviet Union to stay quiet about their experiences.

In early 1942, Dawletschin was transferred to another camp, Wuhlheide, where Soviet collaborators were trained to contribute to the German war effort. It is not clear in Dawletschin's memoirs why he was released in July 1942. He always denied participation in the Volga Tatar legion raised by Germany, largely from the population of prisoners of war released for this purpose. However, according to the research of historian Sebastian Cwiklinski, Dawletschin was one of the founders of the legion's newspaper, Idel-Ural, and worked in the Tatar radio run by the Reich Ministry of Public Enlightenment and Propaganda. Similar to other Nazi collaborators from the Soviet Union, he claimed to be a victim of both the Soviet and Nazi systems. Dawletschin was more critical of the former: among his many criticisms of the Soviet policies on military, nationality, and religion, he alleged that Soviet authorities were deliberately trying to kill off Tatar intellectuals under the guise of war.

After the war, he avoided repatriation to the Soviet Union due to illness and remained in Germany until his death in 1983. He worked at the United States–funded Institut zur Erforschung der UdSSR. Dawletschin is still considered an important, though controversial, figure in Tatar nationalism due to his writings about the language and nationality. He married Irma Dawletschin, who co-edited a German–Tatar dictionary with him, and their daughter is the Middle East historian Camilla Dawletschin-Linder.

== Published works ==
- Dawletschin, Tamurbek (2021). Von Kasan bis Bergen-Belsen: Erinnerungen eines sowjetischen Kriegsgefangenen 1941/42 (in German). Translated by Drevs, David. Göttingen: Wallstein. doi:10.5771/9783835347458. ISBN 978-3-8353-5026-7. Originally published in 2005
- Dawletschin, Tamurbek; Dawletschin, Irma; Tezcan, Semih (1989). Tatarisch-deutsches Wörterbuch. Turkologie und Türkeikunde (in German). Wiesbaden: Harrassowitz.
