= Abdulla Aliş =

Soviet Tatar poet, writer and resistance fighter (1908–1944)

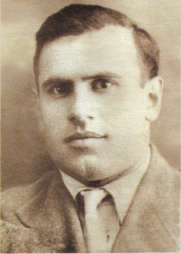
- Born: Alişev Ğabdullacan Ğäbdelbari ulı 15 September 1908; Kayuki, Spassky Uyezd, Kazan Governorate, Russian Empire
- Died: 25 August 1944 (aged 35); Plötzensee Prison, Berlin, Germany
- Occupation: Poet
- Writing career
- Genres: Fantasy, Children's Novels

Alişev Ğabdullacan Ğäbdelbari ulı (Note: pronounced [aˈliʃəf ɣʌbduˌlaˈʑan ɣæbˌdelbaˈrɯɪ uˈlɯ]; Tatar Cyrillic: Алишев Габдуллаҗан Габделбари улы; Russian: Алишев Габдуллазян Габдулбариевич, Alishev Gabdullazyan Gabdulbarievich) (15 September 1908 – 25 August 1944), best known as Abdulla Aliş, (Note: [ʌbduˈla aˈliʃ]; Cyrillic: Абдулла Алиш, also anglicized as Abdulla Alish) was a Soviet Tatar poet, playwright, writer and resistance fighter.

== Life ==
He wrote mostly novels for children, the most notable writings being: Dulqınnar (engl. The Waves, 1934), Ant (engl. The Oath, 1935), Minem abí (engl. My Brother, 1940), as well as fairy-tales, collected to Ana äkiätläre (engl. Mother’s Fairy-Tales, 1941). He also wrote several pieces for puppet-shows, the most notable Sertotmas ürdäk (engl. The Blabbing Duck).

In addition to his writing, Aliş spent his early years working towards the construction and improvement of an electric power station in the town of Menzelinsk, on the shores of the Qaban Lakes. From 1933 he worked as a professional journalist and executive secretary for the youth magazine Pioner kələme. In 1941, he was appointed Chief Editor of the Tatar Radio Committee.

In 1941, Aliş joined the Red Army and fought in World War II. That same year, he was taken prisoner by the Wehrmacht near the city of Bryansk. It was here that he met resistance fighter and poet Musa Cälil; both later gained entrance into the Idel-Ural Legion. While in prison, they formed an underground resistance group to oppose the Nazis. Their plans were later discovered, and as a result both men were guillotined in the prison of Plötzensee.
