= Ittifaq Party =

Political party in Tatarstan, Russia

Ittifaq Party Татар милли бәйсезлек партиясе «Иттифак»
- Leader: Fauziya Bayramova
- Founded: April 1990
- Legalised: 2 January 1992
- Newspaper: Altyn Urda
- Ideology: Tatar nationalism; Tatar independence

Party flag
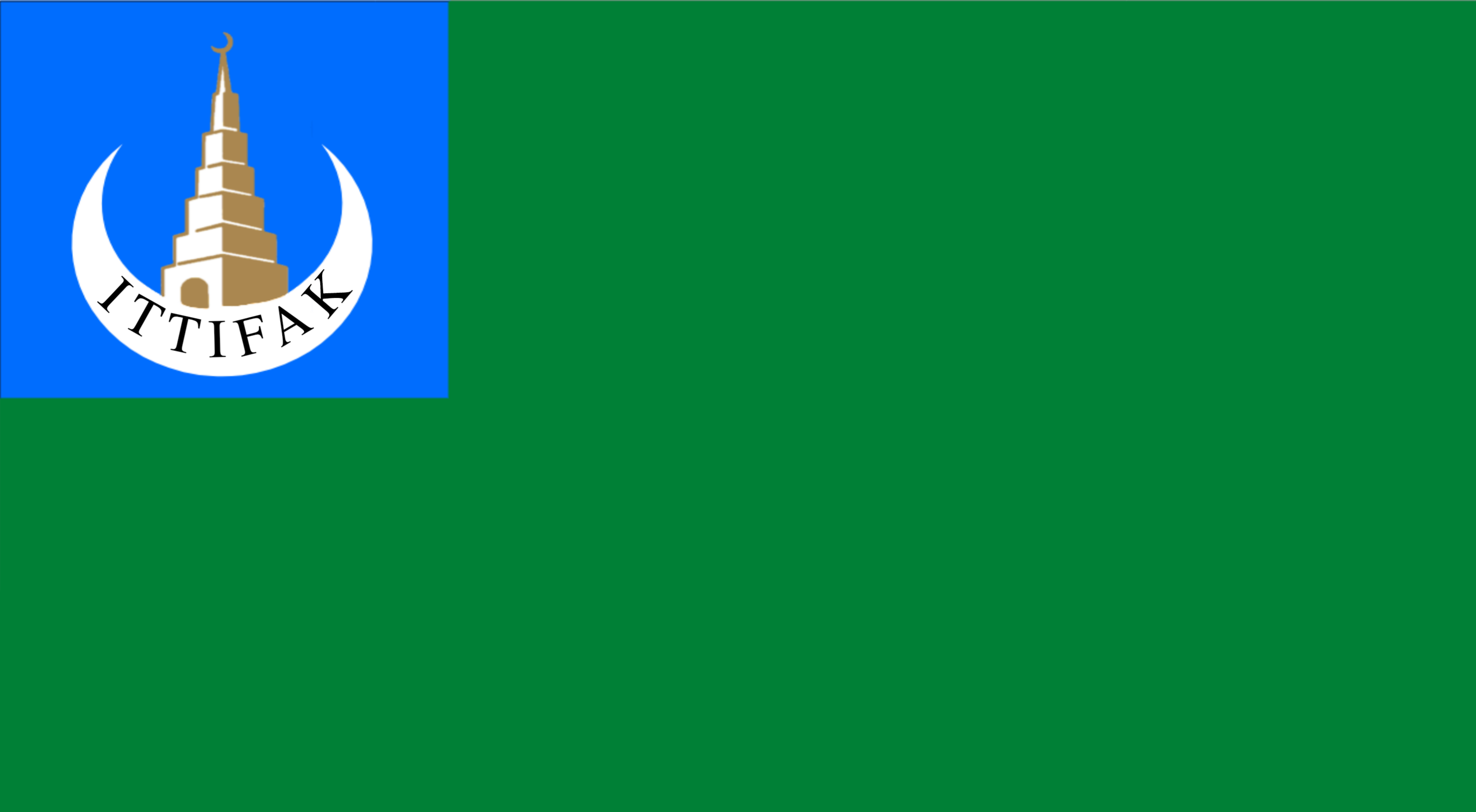

The Party of Tatar National Independence Ittifaq (Note: Also written as Ittifak.) (Note: Tatar: Татар милли бәйсезлек партиясе «Иттифак», romanized: Tatar milli bäysezlek partiyäse «Ittifak», Russian: Татарская партия национальной независимости «Иттифак», romanized: Tatarskaya partiya natsionalnoy nezavisimosti «Ittifak») is a political party founded in the Tatar ASSR in April, 1990, and officially registered on January 3, 1992. Ittifaq was the first non-communist party in Tatarstan. It is commonly referred to as a Tatar nationalist party. It was named in honour of Ittifaq al-Muslimin, a pre-revolutionary Muslim political party represented in the Duma in Tsarist Russia.

The aims, as claimed by the party, are:

- revival of the Tatar nation
- restoring Tatar statehood
- recognition of the Tatar state as an international entity.

The permanent leader of the Ittifaq party is Fauziya Bayramova. She has been leading the party for more than 20 years. The party published its own newspaper - Altyn Urda - from 1993 to 1998.

== See also ==
- All-Tatar Public Center
