= Youri Egorov =

Soviet and Dutch classical pianist (1954 - 1988)

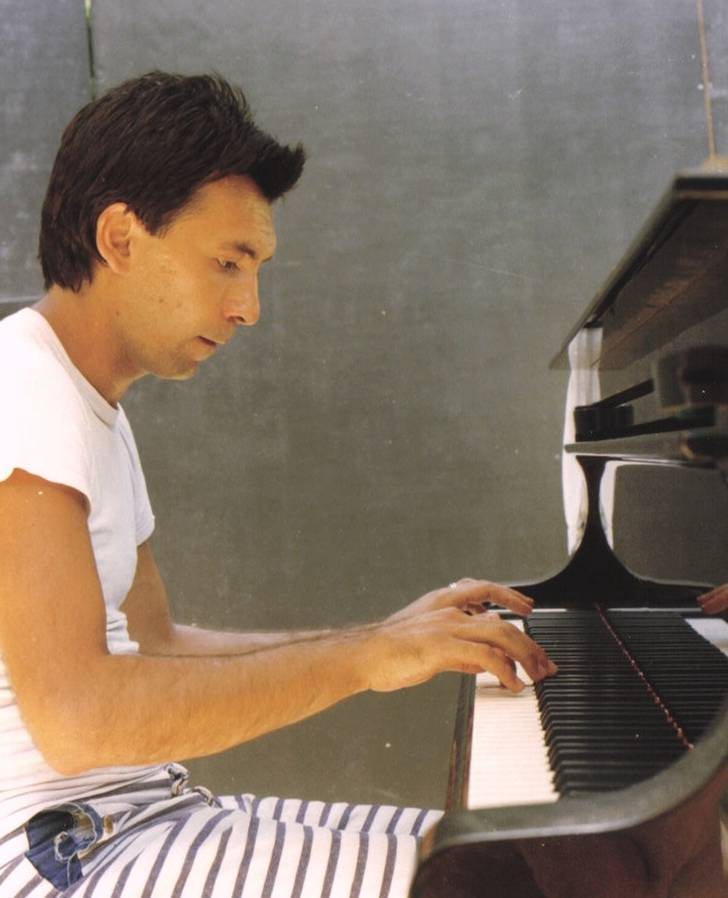
- Egorov at La Roque-d'Anthéron in 1983
- Born: Youri Aleksandrovich Egorov; 28 May 1954; Kazan, Tatar ASSR, Russian SFSR, Soviet Union
- Died: 16 April 1988 (aged 33); Amsterdam, Netherlands
- Resting place: Westerveld Cemetery, Driehuis, Netherlands
- Education: Special Music School at the Kazan Conservatory; Moscow Conservatory
- Occupation: Pianist
- Partner: Jan Brouwer
- Awards: 4th prize, Long-Thibaud Competition (1971); 3rd prize, International Tchaikovsky Competition (1974); 3rd prize, Queen Elisabeth Competition (1975)
- Musical career
- Genre: Classical music
- Instrument: Piano
- Years active: 1971–1988
- Label: EMI Classics

Signature
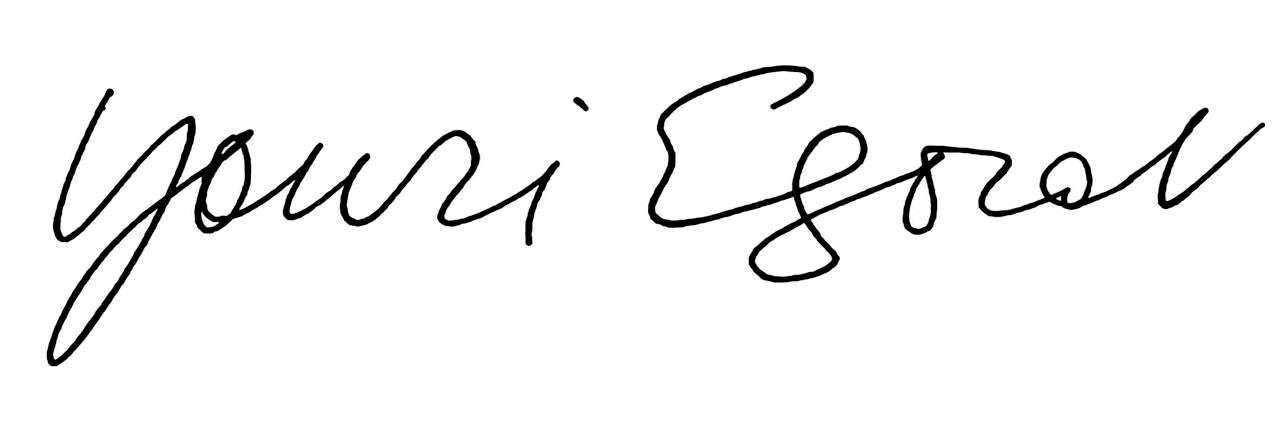

Youri Aleksandrovich Egorov (Russian: Юрий Александрович Егоров; 28 May 1954 – 16 April 1988) was a Soviet and Dutch classical pianist. He won third prize at the International Tchaikovsky Competition in 1974 and at the Queen Elisabeth Competition in 1975. After leaving the Soviet Union in 1976 and seeking political asylum in the Netherlands, he developed an international career as a recitalist and orchestral soloist in Europe and the United States.

== Early years ==
Born in Kazan, USSR, Egorov began his music education in Kazan at the age of six. In 1961 he entered the special music school affiliated with the Kazan Conservatory, where he studied piano with Irina Dubinina, a former pupil of Yakov Zak.

At the age of 17, in 1971, Egorov won 4th prize at the Marguerite Long-Jacques Thibaud Competition in Paris. He then studied at the Moscow Conservatory with Yakov Zak. Egorov remained at the Moscow Conservatory for six years. In 1974, Egorov won the bronze medal at the Tchaikovsky Competition in Moscow. In 1975, he was awarded the 3rd prize at the Queen Elisabeth International Music Competition of Belgium.

== Defection and career in the West ==
Egorov defected from the Soviet Union in 1976 while on a concert tour in Rome, Italy and travelled to Amsterdam where he was to meet Jan Brouwer (1947–1988), his long term partner.

In 1977 Egorov participated in the Van Cliburn Competition in Fort Worth, Texas. He became an audience favorite. When he was not chosen as a finalist, a group of patrons and Cliburn board members formed an ad-hoc committee led by Cliburn trustee Beverley Taylor Smith and American impresario Maxim Gershunoff, which raised money equal to the Van Cliburn top prize of $10,000 to further Egorov's career by funding a New York debut. The South African Steven DeGroote took the first place award that year. Gershunoff as Egorov's American manager presented his New York recital debut in Alice Tully Hall at Lincoln Center on January 23, 1978. Three months later, he appeared in Chicago, Illinois and a critic there dubbed his performance "the debut of the decade." In July, 1978, Musical America Magazine selected Youri Egorov as their "Musician of the Month". He made his Carnegie Hall debut on December 16, 1978 once again under the aegis of Gershunoff. The concert was recorded live. Writing for The New York Times, Harold C. Schonberg said Egorov played "...in a free, romantic style, and his approach is quite different from that of so many competition winners."

In August 1979, two of Egorov's albums appeared on Billboard Magazine's Best-Selling Classical LP chart. Throughout the 1980s Egorov played primarily in Europe. His last American appearance was in Florida in 1986.

Egorov was featured in the book Great Contemporary Pianists Speak for Themselves compiled by Elyse Mach. In it, he spoke candidly on the topics of rehearsal, pre-concert nervousness, artistic restrictions in Russia, and homosexuality. Sviatoslav Richter, Dinu Lipatti, Arturo Benedetti Michelangeli, Vladimir Horowitz and Glenn Gould are among the pianists Youri Egorov cited as having influenced him.

== Death and legacy ==
Egorov died at his home in Amsterdam aged 33 from complications of AIDS. At the time of his death 14 recordings of his had been commercially issued, and several more were awaiting release. He is buried alongside Jan Brouwer at Driehuis Velsen Crematorium, Driehuis, North Holland, Netherlands.

Parallels have been drawn between the playing styles of Youri Egorov and Dinu Lipatti.

In 1989 Egorov was the subject of a VPRO Television documentary, "Youri Egorov 1954–1988" by Eline Flipse. The program won the special prize of the jury at the BANFF World television festival in Canada and was nominated in 1990 for the Prix Italia.

Egorov's posthumously released CD, "Legacy 2: Youri Egorov", received the "Perfect Five-Star Rating" from CD Review Magazine.

According to French critic Jean-Pierre Thiollet, Egorov's style of playing remains notable "for the incredible delicacy and clarity of his playing".

In 2026, Egorov was portrayed by Georgian actor Levan Gelbakhiani in the biographical drama Youri, directed by Sander Burger and based on Jan Brokken's book In het huis van de dichter. The film, in which Joes Brauers plays Brokken, opened the 2026 Film by the Sea festival.

== Overview of recordings ==
Recording date	Composer	Work	Recorded at	Release or archive
8 June 1971	Saint-Saëns	Piano Concerto No. 2 in G minor, Op. 22, ORTF Philharmonic Orchestra, conductor Pierre Dervaux	Théâtre des Champs-Élysées, Paris	YouTube
29 June 1974	Rachmaninoff	Rhapsody on a Theme of Paganini in A minor for piano and orchestra, Op. 43, USSR State Radio and Television Symphony Orchestra, conductor Dmitri Kitayenko	Great Hall of the Moscow Conservatory, Moscow	Melodiya MEL CD 10 02349
2 November 1974	Tchaikovsky	Piano Concerto No. 3 in E-flat major, Op. 75, Radio Philharmonic Orchestra, conductor Roberto Benzi	Concertgebouw, Main Hall, Amsterdam	ET'CETERA KTC 1469
3 November 1974	Shostakovich	Prelude and Fugue in G major, Op. 87 No. 3	VARA Studio 1, Hilversum	ET'CETERA KTC 1520
3 November 1974	Tchaikovsky	Theme and Variations in F major, Op. 19 No. 6 October: Autumn Song in D minor from The Seasons, Op. 37a No. 10	VARA Studio 1, Hilversum	ET'CETERA KTC 1520
3 November 1974	Liszt	Grande étude de Paganini No. 3 in G-sharp minor La campanella, S. 141	VARA Studio 1, Hilversum	ET'CETERA KTC 1520
1975	Chopin	Scherzo No. 2 in B-flat minor, Op. 31 (fragment)	Kazan Television Studio, Prelyudiya, Kazan	YouTube
27 May 1975	Maes	Concerto, BRT Symphony Orchestra, conductor Irwin Hoffman	Centre for Fine Arts, Henry Le Boeuf Hall, Brussels	Deutsche Grammophon 2530 602; audio archive of the Queen Elisabeth Competition
27 May 1975	Schumann	Carnaval, Op. 9	Centre for Fine Arts, Henry Le Boeuf Hall, Brussels	Cypres Records CYP9612; audio archive of the Queen Elisabeth Competition
27 May 1975	Tchaikovsky	Piano Concerto No. 1 in B-flat minor, Op. 23, BRT Symphony Orchestra, conductor Irwin Hoffman	Centre for Fine Arts, Henry Le Boeuf Hall, Brussels	Audio archive of the Queen Elisabeth Competition
June 1975	Bach	Prelude and Fugue No. 5 in D major, BWV 850; Prelude and Fugue No. 13 in F-sharp major, BWV 858; Prelude and Fugue No. 24 in B minor, BWV 869; Italian Concerto in F major, BWV 971	Studio Gravison	Astoria Stereo DP 87001; Pavane ADW 7029
23 November 1975	Prokofiev	Piano Sonata No. 3 in A minor, Op. 28; Piano Sonata No. 8 in B-flat major, Op. 84	studio recording in Belgium	Unknown
20 March 1976	Saint-Saëns	Piano Concerto No. 2 in G minor, Op. 22, Radio Philharmonic Orchestra, conductor Guido Ajmone-Marsan	Concertgebouw, Main Hall, Amsterdam	NPO Klassiek
21 March 1976	Bach	Italian Concerto in F major, BWV 971	VARA Studio 1, Hilversum	NPO Klassiek
21 March 1976	Scarlatti	Sonata in G major, K. 125; Sonata in D minor, K. 32; Sonata in A major, K. 322; Sonata in E major, K. 380; Sonata in F major, K. 518; Sonata in B minor, K. 87	VARA Studio 1, Hilversum	NPO Klassiek
21 March 1976	Chopin	Étude in E major, Op. 10 No. 3 Tristesse; Étude in C-sharp minor, Op. 10 No. 4 Scherzo No. 2 in B-flat minor, Op. 31	VARA Studio 1, Hilversum	NPO Klassiek
16 November 1976	Chopin	Twelve Études, Op. 10	Studio 1, Broadcasting Music Centre, Hilversum	DeHaan Records WH002
15 January 1977	Rachmaninoff	Rhapsody on a Theme of Paganini Op. 43, Radio Philharmonic Orchestra, conductor Jean Fournet	Concertgebouw, Main Hall, Amsterdam	NPO Klassiek
8 August 1977	Brahms	Piano Quintet in F minor, Op. 34, Orlando Quartet	Studio 9, Hilversum	ET'CETERA KTC 1469
22 August 1977	Schubert	Sonata for Violin and Piano in A major, D 574, Emmy Verhey, violin Sonatina for Violin and Piano No. 3 in G minor, D 408, Emmy Verhey, violin	Concertgebouw, Recital Hall, Amsterdam	ET'CETERA KTC 1469
12 September 1977	Haydn	Sonata in C minor, Hob. XVI:20, finale: Allegro	Ed Landreth Hall, Texas Christian University, Fort Worth	DeHaan Records WH003
12 September 1977	Liszt	Grande étude de Paganini No. 3 in G-sharp minor La campanella, S. 141	Ed Landreth Hall, Texas Christian University, Fort Worth	DeHaan Records WH003
12 September 1977	Bach	Partita No. 6 in E minor, BWV 830, Toccata	Ed Landreth Hall, Texas Christian University, Fort Worth	DeHaan Records WH003
12 September 1977	Chopin	Scherzo No. 2 in B-flat minor, Op. 31, cut off at bar 130	Ed Landreth Hall, Texas Christian University, Fort Worth	DeHaan Records WH003
16 September 1977	Mozart	Piano Sonata No. 8 in A minor, K. 310, first movement: Allegro maestoso	Ed Landreth Hall, Texas Christian University, Fort Worth	DeHaan Records WH003
16 September 1977	Schumann	Kreisleriana, Op. 16, incomplete	Ed Landreth Hall, Texas Christian University, Fort Worth	DeHaan Records WH003
19 September 1977	Scarlatti	Sonatas K. 325, K. 380, K. 125, K. 322, K. 518 and K. 32	Ed Landreth Hall, Texas Christian University, Fort Worth	DeHaan Records WH003
19 September 1977	Barber	Ballade, Op. 46	Ed Landreth Hall, Texas Christian University, Fort Worth	DeHaan Records WH003
19 September 1977	Prokofiev	Piano Sonata No. 8 in B-flat major, Op. 84	Ed Landreth Hall, Texas Christian University, Fort Worth	DeHaan Records WH003
19 January 1978	Beethoven	Piano Concerto No. 3 in C minor, Op. 37, Amsterdam Philharmonic Orchestra, conductor Hans Vonk	Concertgebouw, Main Hall, Amsterdam	ET'CETERA KTC 1469
12 February 1978	Liszt	Grande étude de Paganini No. 3 in G-sharp minor La campanella, S. 141	Ambassador Auditorium, Pasadena	First Hand Records FHR44
10 March 1978	Beethoven	Fantasy in C minor for piano, chorus and orchestra Op. 80 Choral Fantasy, Radio Philharmonic Orchestra and Netherlands Radio Choir, conductor Willem van Otterloo	Concertgebouw, Main Hall, Amsterdam	ET'CETERA KTC 1469
10 March 1978	Rachmaninoff	Rhapsody on a Theme of Paganini in A minor, Op. 43, Radio Philharmonic Orchestra, conductor Willem van Otterloo	Concertgebouw, Main Hall, Amsterdam	ET'CETERA KTC 1469
19 October 1978	Schumann	Carnaval, Op. 9	Südwestfunk television studio, Baden-Baden	DVD included with ET'CETERA KTC 1469
19 October 1978	Prokofiev	Piano Sonata No. 8 in B-flat major, Op. 84	Südwestfunk television studio, Baden-Baden	DVD included with ET'CETERA KTC 1469
19 October 1978	Liszt	Grande étude de Paganini No. 3 in G-sharp minor La campanella, S. 141	Südwestfunk television studio, Baden-Baden	DVD included with ET'CETERA KTC 1469
2 December 1978	Bach	Italian Concerto in F major, BWV 971	Ambassador Auditorium, Pasadena	First Hand Records FHR47D
2 December 1978	Chopin	Études Op. 10 Nos. 1 and 3–6; Scherzo No. 2 in B-flat minor, Op. 31; Étude Op. 10 No. 8, rehearsal recording	Ambassador Auditorium, Pasadena	First Hand Records FHR47D
2 December 1978	Mozart	Fantasia No. 4 in C minor, K. 475	Ambassador Auditorium, Pasadena	First Hand Records FHR47D
2 December 1978	Schumann	Carnaval, Op. 9	Ambassador Auditorium, Pasadena	First Hand Records FHR47D
2 December 1978	Debussy	Reflets dans l'eau from Images, Book I	Ambassador Auditorium, Pasadena	First Hand Records FHR47D
2 December 1978	Liszt	Grande étude de Paganini No. 3 in G-sharp minor La campanella, S. 141	Ambassador Auditorium, Pasadena	First Hand Records FHR47D
16 December 1978	Bach	Chromatic Fantasia and Fugue in D minor, BWV 903	Carnegie Hall, New York	EMI Classics 50999 2 06531 2 5; Globe GLO 6015
16 December 1978	Chopin	Étude in E major, Op. 10 No. 3 Tristesse; Étude in G-flat major, Op. 10 No. 5 Black Keys; Fantaisie in F minor, Op. 49	Carnegie Hall, New York	EMI Classics 50999 2 06531 2 5; Globe GLO 6015
16 December 1978	Mozart	Fantasia No. 4 in C minor, K. 475	Carnegie Hall, New York	EMI Classics 50999 2 06531 2 5; Globe GLO 6015
11 March 1979	Chopin	Fantaisie in F minor, Op. 49	Studio 1, Broadcasting Music Centre, Hilversum	DeHaan Records WH002
17 March 1979	Brahms	Violin Sonata No. 3 in D minor, Op. 108, Emmy Verhey, violin	Auditorium, Katholieke Hogeschool Tilburg, Tilburg	ET'CETERA KTC 1469
May 1979	Schumann	Fantasie in C major, Op. 17	De Vest, Alkmaar	Globe GLO 6015, GLO 5002
15 June 1979	Tchaikovsky	Piano Concerto No. 1 in B-flat minor, Op. 23, Royal Concertgebouw Orchestra, conductor Antal Doráti	RAI Amsterdam	KRO television recording; NOS radio recording
17 December 1979	Chopin	Twelve Études, Op. 10 and 25	Carnegie Hall, New York	Music Heritage Society 4493; ET'CETERA KTC 1469
31 January 1980	Bach	Partita No. 6 in E minor, BWV 830	Concertgebouw, Main Hall, Amsterdam	Legacy 2, Canal Grande CG 9214
31 January 1980	Bartók	Piano Sonata (1926), BB 88	Concertgebouw, Main Hall, Amsterdam	Legacy 2, Canal Grande CG 9214
31 January 1980	Chopin	Twelve Études, Op. 10	Concertgebouw, Main Hall, Amsterdam	Legacy 2, Canal Grande CG 9214
3 April 1980	Mozart	Fantasia No. 4 in C minor, K. 475	Ambassador Auditorium, Pasadena	First Hand Records FHR44
3 April 1980	Schumann	Fantasie in C major, Op. 17	Ambassador Auditorium, Pasadena	First Hand Records FHR44
3 April 1980	Chopin	Twelve Études, Op. 25	Ambassador Auditorium, Pasadena	First Hand Records FHR44
3 April 1980	Debussy	Reflets dans l'eau from Images, Book I	Ambassador Auditorium, Pasadena	First Hand Records FHR44
1981	Schumann	Papillons Op. 2	Abbey Road Studios, London	EMI Classics 50999 2 06531 2 5
1981	Schumann	Carnaval, Op. 9 Toccata in C major, Op. 7	EMI Records, London	EMI Classics 50999 2 06531 2 5
19 February 1981	Prokofiev	Piano Sonata No. 8 in B-flat major, Op. 84	Concertgebouw, Main Hall, Amsterdam	Legacy 3, Canal Grande CG 9215
19 February 1981	Haydn	Sonata in C minor, Hob. XVI:20	Concertgebouw, Main Hall, Amsterdam	Legacy 4, Canal Grande CG 9216
25 May 1981	Bartók	Suite for Piano, Op. 14	Concertgebouw, Recital Hall, Amsterdam	ET'CETERA KTC 1520
June 1981 and July 1982	Chopin	Fantaisie in F minor, Op. 49; Nocturne in D-flat major, Op. 27 No. 2 Nocturne in E minor, Op. posth. 72 No. 1 Nocturne in F-sharp major, Op. 15 No. 2 Scherzo No. 2 in B-flat minor, Op. 31	Abbey Road Studios, London	EMI CDM 7 64302 2; WPCS-23160; Classics 50999 2 06531 2 5
17 June 1981	Chopin	Ballade No. 1 in G minor, Op. 23	Abbey Road Studios, London	EMI Classics 50999 2 06531 2 5
25 August 1981	Brahms	Piano Concerto No. 1 in D minor, Op. 15, Amsterdam Philharmonic Orchestra, conductor Roelof van Driesten	Concertgebouw, Main Hall, Amsterdam	ET'CETERA KTC 1469
4 February 1982	Schubert	Piano Sonata in C minor, D 958	Concertgebouw, Main Hall, Amsterdam	ET'CETERA KTC 1468 and KTC 1469; Philips Essential Recordings 464 375-2; Legacy 1, Canal Grande CG 9213
4 February 1982	Beethoven	Andante favori in F major WoO 57	Concertgebouw, Main Hall, Amsterdam	Legacy 4, Canal Grande CG 9216
4 February 1982	Bartók	Violin Sonata No. 2, BB 85/Sz. 76, Emmy Verhey, violin	Hilversum	ET'CETERA KTC 1469
28 May 1982	Beethoven	Piano Concerto No. 5 in E-flat major, Op. 73, Philharmonia Orchestra, conductor Wolfgang Sawallisch	Abbey Road Studios, London	EMI CDM 7 64302 2; EMI Classics 50999 2 06531 2 5
27 June 1982	Beethoven	Andante favori in F major WoO 57	Bergerie du Domaine de George Sand, Nohant-Vic	Soupir Edition S239
27 June 1982	Schubert	Piano Sonata in C minor, D 958	Bergerie du Domaine de George Sand, Nohant-Vic	Soupir Edition S239
27 June 1982	Chopin	Twelve Études, Op. 10	Bergerie du Domaine de George Sand, Nohant-Vic	Soupir Edition S239
27 June 1982	Debussy	Reflets dans l'eau from Images, Book I Feux d'artifice from Préludes, Book II	Bergerie du Domaine de George Sand, Nohant-Vic	Soupir Edition S239
26 September 1982	Chopin	Piano Concerto No. 2 in F minor, Op. 21, Utrecht Symphony Orchestra, conductor David Zinman	Concertgebouw, Main Hall, Amsterdam	ET'CETERA KTC 1469
22 April 1983	Brahms	Three Intermezzi Op. 117	Concertgebouw, Recital Hall, Amsterdam	ET'CETERA KTC 1520
22 April 1983	Brahms	From Six Pieces for Piano, Op. 118: Intermezzo in A minor No. 1 Intermezzo in A major No. 2 Intermezzo in F minor No. 4	Concertgebouw, Recital Hall, Amsterdam	Philips Essential Recordings 464 375-2
6 May 1983	Prokofiev	Piano Sonata No. 3 in A minor, Op. 28	Concertgebouw, Main Hall, Amsterdam	ET'CETERA KTC 1520
6 May 1983	Shostakovich	Piano Sonata No. 2 in B minor, Op. 61	Concertgebouw, Main Hall, Amsterdam	Legacy 3, Canal Grande CG 9215
13 May 1983	Chopin	Ballade No. 1 in G minor, Op. 23; Nocturne in E minor, Op. posth. 72 No. 1 Nocturne in F-sharp major, Op. 15 No. 2 Nocturne in D-flat major, Op. 27 No. 2 Scherzo No. 2 in B-flat minor, Op. 31	Studio 1, Broadcasting Music Centre, Hilversum	DeHaan Records WH002
28 May 1983	Debussy	Estampes; Reflets dans l'eau from Images, Book I Préludes, Books I and II	Abbey Road Studios, London	EMI Classics 50999 2 06531 2 5; EMI CDS 7 49411 2
16 November 1983	Schumann	Arabeske in C major, Op. 18; Kreisleriana, Op. 16	Concertgebouw, Main Hall, Amsterdam	DeHaan Records WH001
16 November 1983	Debussy	Préludes, Book I	Concertgebouw, Main Hall, Amsterdam	DeHaan Records WH001
22 September 1984	Brahms	Violin Sonata No. 3 in D minor, Op. 108, Emmy Verhey, violin	Concertgebouw, Main Hall, Amsterdam	NPO Klassiek
22 September 1984	Schubert	Moments musicaux, Op. 94 D 780	Concertgebouw, Main Hall, Amsterdam	NPO Klassiek
19 February 1985	Mozart	Piano Concerto No. 17 in G major, K. 453; Piano Concerto No. 20 in D minor, K. 466, Philharmonia Orchestra, conductor Wolfgang Sawallisch	Abbey Road Studios, London	EMI Classics 50999 2 06531 2 5; EMI CDZ 25 27285 2
15 May 1985	Schumann	Arabeske in C major, Op. 18; Bunte Blätter, Op. 99	Abbey Road Studios, London	EMI Classics 50999 2 06531 2 5
25 October 1985	Scarlatti	Sonata in D minor, K. 9 Sonata in D minor, K. 32; Sonata in B minor, K. 87; Sonata in G major, K. 125; Sonata in C major, K. 159; Sonata in A major, K. 322; Sonata in E major, K. 380; Sonata in F major, K. 518	Concertgebouw, Recital Hall, Amsterdam	ET'CETERA KTC 1520
3 January 1986	Brahms	Piano Concerto No. 2 in B-flat major, Op. 83, National Youth Orchestra of the Netherlands, conductor Adam Gatehouse	Concertgebouw, Main Hall, Amsterdam	ET'CETERA KTC 1469
25 January 1986	Babajanian	Bilder für Piano (1965)	De IJsbreker, Amsterdam	Legacy 3, Canal Grande CG 9215
7 March 1987	Schumann	Bunte Blätter, Op. 99; Fantasie in C major, Op. 17; Noveletten, Op. 21 Nos. 1 and 8	Concertgebouw, Main Hall, Amsterdam	NPO Klassiek
28 March 1987	Ravel	Miroirs	De IJsbreker, Amsterdam	ET'CETERA KTC 1520
24 April 1987	Tchaikovsky	October: Autumn Song in D minor from The Seasons, Op. 37a No. 10	VARA Studio 1, Hilversum	ET'CETERA KTC 1520
24 April 1987	Beethoven	Andante favori in F major WoO 57	VARA Studio 1, Hilversum	Legacy 4, Canal Grande CG 9216
27 November 1987	Schubert	Piano Quintet in A major, D 667 (Trout Quintet), Orlando Quartet	Concertgebouw, Recital Hall, Amsterdam	ET'CETERA KTC 1469
27 November 1987	Schubert	Six Moments musicaux D 780	Concertgebouw, Recital Hall, Amsterdam	ET'CETERA KTC 1468 and KTC 1469; Philips Essential Recordings 464 375-2; Legacy 1, Canal Grande CG 9213

== See also ==
- List of Eastern Bloc defectors
