= All-Tatar Public Center =

Nationalist organisation in Tatarstan, Russia

All-Tatar Public Center Бөтентатар Иҗтимагый Үзәге Bötentatar İctimaği Üzäge
- Chairperson: Farit Zakiev
- Founders: Marat Molekev; Fauziya Bayramova
- Founded: 7 July 1988
- Banned: 10 June 2022
- Headquarters: Kazan, Tatarstan
- Ideology: Tatar nationalism

Flag of All-Tatar Public Center

The All-Tatar Public Center (ATPC) (Note: Tatar: Бөтентатар Иҗтимагый Үзәге, romanized: Bötentatar İctimağí Üzäge; Russian: Всетата́рский Обще́ственный Центр, romanized: Vsetatarskiy Obščestvenny Centr) was a Tatar nationalist organization founded on 7 July 1988 to promote Tatarstan sovereignty and self-determination. The ATPC headquarters were in Kazan, Tatarstan. On 10 June 2022 the organization was labeled an extremist organization and dissolved by the government of Tatarstan.

== History ==
The first congress (qorıltay) of Tatar nationalists was held in February, 1989. The newly formed organization was named the Tatar Public Center (Tatar İctimağí Üzäge). The charter and the program of the ATPC were adopted at the second congress (February, 1991). At this congress, the name of the organization was changed to the All-Union Tatar Public Center and the 35-member presidium was elected. Subsequently, after the fall of the Soviet Union, the name was changed once again to what it is now (1992).

The ATPC was established by M. Molekev (the first chairman), I Amikhanov, Fauziya Bayramova, Z. Zaynulin, R. Safin, F. Safiullin and some others. Most of them were intellectuals from Kazan State University. The current chairman is Rafis Kashapov.

In late 1980s- early 1990s, the ATPC organized many demonstrations and public meetings demanding that the government of Tatarstan proclaims the republic independent of Russia. The only time when these manifestations resulted in clashes and street fighting was on October 15, 1991, when Russian nationalists arranged a counter-demonstration which provoked a violent confrontation.

In the following years, Tatarstan's government led by Mintimer Shaymiev has assumed a more adversarial position towards Moscow, which significantly weakened the ATPC's unique role as the defender of ethnic Tatars. As a result, the ATPC's popularity went down among the majority of the population while the popularity of president Shaymiev grew. Tatarstan's special status within the Russian Federation and economic concessions from Moscow achieved by Shaymiev made many demands of Tatar nationalists superfluous.

In the last few years, the ATPC has not been as active as in the past. The majority of the participants in its most recent demonstrations are pensioners. The only exception is the Memorial Day (Xäter Köne) held in October of each year to commemorate the fall of Kazan. This event attracts many participants, both young and old, from all parts of Idel-Ural and is accompanied by a funeral march and Tatar rock music concerts.

In some regions of Russia, local chapters of the Tatar Public Center collaborate with local officials and concentrate mostly on cultural activities within local Tatar diasporas. However, in Bashkortostan the ATPC played an important political role as an opposition force against the regime of president Murtaza Rakhimov.

On 15 January 2021 the Prosecutor's Office of Tatarstan sent a request to the Supreme Court of the republic demanding the organization be liquidated after it was recognized as being "extremist" by authorities. In response the organization held a series of emergency meetings between February 13 and 24 and appealed to the court to "show objectivity and protect our constitutional rights." On 17 October 2021 the Ministry of Justice suspended the organization citing "extremist activities". On 10 June 2022 the Tatarstan government recognized the All-Tatar Public Center as an extremist organization and dissolved it. The organization was later added to the Russian government's list of "extremist organizations".

== Functions ==
The main aims of the ATPC are: achieving independence for Tatarstan, establishing diplomatic relations with the Russian Federation as with foreign state, protection of the Tatar language and culture, making Tatar the only official language of Tatarstan or an official language in Russia alongside Russian. The ATPC is also striving to revive Islam in Tatarstan, to support Tatar diasporas and to protect the rights of ethnic Tatars all over the world.

The main publications of the ATPC are: Taşqın (Stream), Millät (Nation) and Russian language Izvestiya TOTs (Russian: Известия ТОЦ - Proceedings of ATPC). The governing bodies of the organization are Qorıltay (Congress), Ğäli Mäcles (Plenum), Presidium (works permanently) and the chairman. Congresses: 1st (1989), 2nd (1991), 3rd & 4th (1993), 5th (1996), 6th (1999), 7th (2002).

== See also ==
- Ittifaq party
