= Rashid Nezhmetdinov =

Soviet chess player (1912–1974)

Rashid Nezhmetdinov Рашид Нежметдинов Рәшит Нәҗметдинов

Personal information
- Full name: Rashid Gibyatovich Nezhmetdinov
- Born: 15 December 1912 Aktiubinsk, Russian Empire
- Died: 3 June 1974 (aged 61) Kazan, Tatar ASSR, Russian SFSR, Soviet Union

Chess career
- Country: Soviet Union
- Title: International Master (1954)
- Peak rating: 2455 (January 1973)

Rashid Gibyatovich Nezhmetdinov (Note: Russian: Раши́д Гибя́тович Нежметди́нов, Tatar: Рәшит Һибәт улы Нәҗметдинов, Räşit Hibät ulı Näcmetdinov; IPA: [ræˈʃit næʑmetˈdinof]) (15 December 1912 – 3 June 1974) was a Soviet chess player, chess writer, International Master and checkers player. Although he never attained the title of Grandmaster, he was a renowned tactician and created several brilliant games. Biographer Alex Pishkin compares him to Chigorin, Réti and Spielmann.

== Early life ==
Nezhmetdinov was born in Aktubinsk, Russian Empire, in what is now Aktobe, Kazakhstan, to a Tatar family. His parents were "worked to death" when he was still very young, rendering him (and his two siblings) an orphan. (His older brother Kavi Nadzhmi became a notable Tatar poet during Soviet Times). Nezhmetdinov was then sent to live with his uncle, in a small town on the banks of the Volga river. From 1918-1923, the Russian Civil War devastated the region, particularly with the introduction of the Prodrazvyorstka policy, a system whereby peasants' foodgrain was confiscated at nominal prices, as per fixed quotas. The ensuing famine killed over 2 million children. But Nezhmetdinov endured, thanks in large part to his poet brother – Kavi Nadzhmi – who secured him a place at a Kazan orphanage. Nezhmetdinov later regarded this orphanage as paradise, his only prior happy memory being "the time he got to eat fish soup on the banks of the Volga." In Kazan, Nezhmetdinov was well-fed for the first time in his life, learned the Tatar language, and was initiated into Islam. During this time, Nezhmetdinov developed a keen interest in history, literature and mathematics. Three years later, Nadzhmi brought Nezhmetdinov into his own home, also at Kazan. Here, Nezhmetdinov was thoroughly engaged in the Kazan "Palace of Pioneers," which marked the beginning of his chess career.

Nezhmetdinov had a natural talent for both chess and checkers, games he had learned by watching others play; and was quickly invited to join the Kazan Chess Club. At 15, he played in Kazan's Tournament of Pioneers, winning all 15 games. He also learned to play checkers at this time. During the same month, he won Kazan's checkers semi-final and placed second in the finals. In the same year, he placed sixth in the Russian Checkers Championship. Later, when he gave up checkers for chess, Nezhmetdinov commented, somewhat dismissively, that all checkers contests can be reduced to rook endgames.

It was around this time that Nadzhmi, now a poorly paid newspaper editor, could no longer afford Nezhmetdinov's upkeep. Nezhmetdinov then joined the Communist Party and moved to Ukraine, in the hopes of making his own way in the world. In Odessa, his Communist Party membership gave him good standing, and he worked as a stoker in a steel mill. He spent all his free time playing at the Odessa Chess Club.

== Initial years (1933–1946) ==
In 1933, Nezhmetdinov, now the Odessa Chess and Checkers Champion, and a Category I chess player, returned to Kazan. He secured employment with the Standards Bureau, taught at the local Pedagogical Institute and ran an informal chess circle. Over the next two years, Nezhmetdinov was primarily concerned with checkers and earned himself the title of Master at the game. This was no small feat considering checkers was taken very seriously in the USSR at the time, and frequently reported in chess magazines. However, it was only after receiving (by his own admission) a "thrashing" from "stronger Category I Chess Players" like Anatoly Ufimtsev and Pyotr Dubinin in 1936, that Nezhmetdinov began to take chess seriously. He fell ill and was hospitalized for many months immediately thereafter. However, in his characteristically optimistic fashion, Nezhmetdinov seized this opportunity to study endgames; typically by solving puzzles without a board. And, in his very next Category I tournament, he won 9 out of 10 games, earning himself the Candidate Master title in 1939. After graduating in 1940, he was called to military service the following year and here his chess development took a major setback. He was deployed in Baikala, 5000 kilometers away, on the border of Mongolia. While Nezhmetdinov still competed in district level tournaments, even securing wins against players like Victor Baturinsky and Konstantin Klaman, his appearances were rare. The war eventually created a five-and-a-half-year period in which Nezhmetdinov did not participate in any tournament.

There was a silver lining though – Nezhmetdinov was consistently deployed or recalled before a major conflict. He arrived in Baikala soon after the Red Army had fought a brutal battle with Japan's Kwantung Army, before then being sent to Berlin immediately after the Soviets had stormed it. Nezhmetdinov successfully avoided all major combat zones in a war that killed over 11 million Soviet soldiers.

== Glory years (1946–1958) ==
And in Berlin, from 1946, Nezhmetdinov was able to resume his long-interrupted chess career and devoted himself entirely to it. In 1946, he won Championship of the Berlin Military District, winning 14 out of 15 games, and finishing ahead of future Ukrainian Champion, Isaac Lipnitsky.

Later that year, Nezhmetdinov, then 34 years old, returned to civilian life; his primary occupation was to serve as the captain of the DSO Spartak chess team. In 1947, Nezhmetdinov finished in shared second place at the All-Union Candidate Master tournament at Yaroslavl. This marked the beginning of a tumultuous friendship between Nezhmetdinov, Vitaly Tarasov (the winner), and Ratmir Kholmov (shared second).

With this performance, Nezhmetdinov had also earned his second Master norm. He now had the right to play an examination game for the title of Soviet Master. Georgy Lisitsin was appointed as Nezhmetdinov's examiner. However, after studying Lisitsin's games for many months, Nezhmetdinov received a telegram from the Soviet Chess Federation, merely days before his match, stating that his examiner would be Vladas Mikenas. Mikenas was a far more formidable opponent.

In his renewed preparations, Nezhmetdinov came across an article written by Mikenas on the Alekhine's Defense, in Shakhmaty v SSSR, a popular chess magazine of the day. Mikenas claimed it was his preferred response to 1. e4 (Nezhmetdinov's favorite first move). This must have been particularly intimidating considering Mikenas had only recently beaten the legendary Alexander Alekhine at the 1937 tournament in Ķemeri, Latvia, with the black pieces no less.

Nevertheless, the fearless Nezhmetdinov still played 1. e4 in their first game and even entered the "Hunt Variation" of the Alekhine Defense; Mikenas’ favorite. He crushed Mikenas in 17 moves. He beat Mikenas again, in the same variation, in Game 11. However, the match was drawn 7-7 and Nezhmetdinov did not gain the coveted Master title, because the examiner got draw odds. However, Nezhmetdinov was not discouraged, and this result only reinforced his belief that the title was within his grasp. However, this optimism must have led to a very few frustrating years for Nezhmetdinov, especially considering how brutally frank he was about his own performance.

His next breakthrough came in 1950, when he earned the right to play at the prestigious RSFSR Championship at Nizhny Novgorod (this Championship was limited to the Russian Federation and thereby second to the USSR Championship). The competition was fierce, with Masters like Isaac Boleslavsky (the tournament's favorite), among many others. Nezhmetdinov drew his game with Boleslavsky and went on to become the 10th Champion of the Russian Federation. He was finally a Soviet Master.

He returned to Kazan, where a hero's welcome awaited him. He went on to win the RSFSR Championship again, in 1951 at Yaroslavl. But his other tournament performances were relatively underwhelming. For instance, at the Baku International in 1964, Nezhmetdinov could only secure 4 points in 12 rounds; a performance he said owed to his underestimation of his opponents. He finished in third place, behind Vladimir Antoshin and Vladimir Bagirov. It is worth noting that around this time, Nezhmetdinov, Vitaly and Ratmir had become boisterous drinking buddies. As the story goes, in Baku, they treated their hotel rooms like they were rockstars. Nezhmetdinov is said to have hurled crockery out the window, and eventually gotten into an argument with Ratmir. Vitaly tried to defuse the situation, but to no avail. By this time, the commotion had caught the attention of GM Alexander Kotov, an observer on behalf of the Soviet Sports Committee. He reported all the three Masters to the Sports Committee. Ratmir and Vitaly received the worst of it (the reason for this is unclear, but some say it is because Nezhmetdinov was the only Communist Party member among them), with each receiving a one-year ban from tournaments and having governments stipends suspended. Nezhmetdinov retained his stipend, and was banned for a shorter period of time.

This marked a turning point in Nezhmetdinov's life and he turned a new leaf. He gave up the "party all night" lifestyle, and married Tamara Ivanovna (little is known about her apart from the fact that she is the mother of Nezhmetdinov's children). It was also around this time that Nezhmetdinov wrote the first-ever chess book in the Tatar language.

Nezhmetdinov's next major tournament was the 1953 RSFSR Championship at Saratov, which he won. And in 1954, Nezhmetdinov finally managed to play on the grand stage, the 21st USSR Championship at Kiev—the holy grail of Soviet Chess. This proved to be Nezhmetdinov's toughest competition so far, as it included other masters like Tigran Petrosian and Efim Geller, who were already ranked amongst the best players in the world. Nezhmetdinov finished the tournament in shared 7th place, but finishing with 4½ wins in 7 matches against grandmasters, was a great achievement in itself.

With the death of Stalin in 1953, Nezhmetdinov was finally able to play chess internationally. Nikita Khrushchev adopted a far less repressive regime, notably removing most travel restrictions for sportsmen. It was also around this time that the Russian Sports Committee came under fire from the international press for only ever sending their "strongest Grandmasters" abroad. The idea was for Russia to send four of their "mere Masters" to the 1954 international tournament at Bucharest. Nezhmetdinov was chosen along with Semyon Furman, Viktor Korchnoi and his old friend, Ratmir Kholmov. Prior to leaving for the tournament, the four masters were summoned to Moscow, where they underwent rigorous training under Isaac Bolevslavsky and David Bronstein.

== International Tournament at Bucharest ==
This was the first time Nezhmetdinov had left the USSR, and the first time he faced top level players outside of the Soviet Union. Among others he defeated Miroslav Filip, Robert Wade, Bogdan Sliwa, Gideon Ståhlberg and Enrico Paoli. Nezhmetdinov and Korchnoi were both leading until the last round, when Korchnoi overtook him and went on to win the tournament. Nezhmetdinov's second place finish earned him the title of International Master.

== Later years (1958–1961) ==
Nezhmetdinov's next tournament was the 1958 USSR Team Championship at Vilnius, where he served as the captain of his team – RSFSR. They finished in third place, among the nine teams at the competition. By now it was 1959, and a 46-year-old Nezhmetdinov was finally feeling the effects of age, only accentuated by his former, hard-living lifestyle. He noted in his autobiography that he was the oldest participant at the opening ceremony of the 1959 USSR Championship in Tbilisi. But his legendary win against Bronstein with the white pieces must have offered him some consolation.

In 1961, he finished second at the Chigorin Memorial Tournament at Rostov on Don, behind only Mark Taimanov. In the same year, Nezhmetdinov would then try to win the prestigious RSFSR Championship at Omsk for a record sixth time. Here, things got off to a rocky start, and Nezhmetdinov finally found himself in a group of five, tied for second place, behind Lev Polugaevsky. A clear second had to be chosen since the top two players would get a chance to play in the next USSR Championship. Nezhmetdinov triumphed, winning the tie-break and finishing ahead of Vladimir Antoshin and Anatoly Lein. And with that, Nezhmetdinov qualified to participate at the 29th USSR Championship in Baku later the same year. Unfortunately in that tournament, Nezhmetdinov only finished in 19th place; but won many notable games.

== Final years (1961–1974) ==
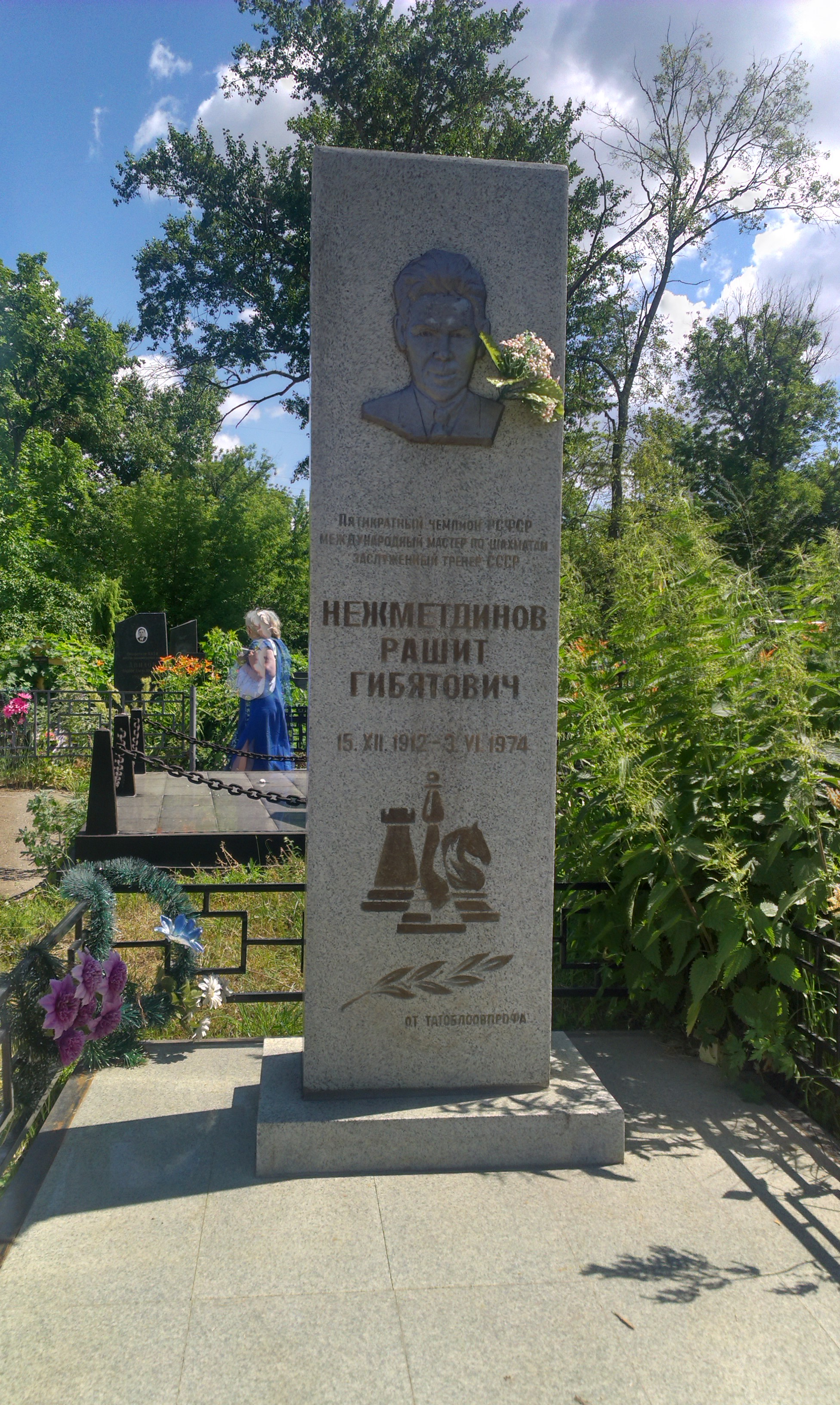
Nezhmetdinov's gravestone in the Arskoe Cemetery in Kazan, Tatarstan Republic, Russia

During the 1960's onwards - Nezhmetdinov gradually shifted his focus from tournament play to chess coaching. He coached Russian Federation Junior team where his students included Anatoly Karpov. In 1967, he competed in his fifth USSR championship at Kharkov. The competition was diluted, as over 120 players were invited in a bid to celebrate the 50th anniversary of the October Revolution. Nezhmetdinov still only finished in 27th place, a position he shared with 14 other players. His next major tournament, almost 6 years later, was the 1973 Latvian Open at Daugavpils. However he fell ill during the tournament and was unable to finish his last game. He finished in third place.

In his last few years, he coached the Kazan Chess team at the Old City Chess Club and regularly gave simultaneous exhibitions in his hometown. He was said to be an approachable and joyful man, who was always ready to discuss anything under the sun; especially chess. Nezhmetdinov passed on in the summer of 1974.

== Developments in his checkers career ==
In 1949, the Russian Checkers Semifinals were held in Kazan. Nezhmetdinov attended as a spectator, but when one of the participants failed to show up, Nezhmetdinov agreed to substitute for him even though he had not played checkers for 15 years. He won every game, qualifying him for the finals, which were to be held immediately after a chess tournament in which he was also participating. He won the tournament and immediately thereafter placed second in the Russian Checkers Championship.

== Chess career ==
=== Playing style ===
Nezhmetdinov was a fierce, imaginative, attacking player who beat many of the best players in the world. Known for his committal and his aggressive, forward-moving playing style, he was occasionally referred to by the nickname "No Reverse Gear" Rashid.

=== Russian Championship ===
Nezhmetdinov got the historical record of five wins of the Russian Chess Championship, 1950, 1951, 1953, 1957 and 1958.

=== International Master title ===
FIDE awarded him the International Master title for his second-place finish behind Viktor Korchnoi at Bucharest 1954, the only time he was able to compete outside of the Soviet Union.

=== The elusive grandmaster title ===
There are a few schools of thought on why Nezhmetdinov never became a grandmaster. The first, believes that Nezhmetdinov was obsessed with attack, and played for tactics and complications, even when there was none. Accordingly, they believe it was his ineptitude for defence that led to him never receiving the title. Grandmaster Yuri Averbakh, a strong positional and endgame player, suggested this in his interview by Dirk Jan ten Geuzendam in The Day Kasparov Quit:

Nezhmetdinov, ... if he had the attack, could kill anybody, including Tal. But my score against him was something like 8½–½ because I did not give him any possibility for an active game. In such cases he would immediately start to spoil his position because he was looking for complications.

Others believe he was discriminated against because he was a Muslim (tatar) and therefore given fewer chances to go abroad. Korchnoi remembered Nezhmetdinov:

I played my first tournament after my marriage in Sochi. This was the Russian SFSR championship, and it was won by Nezhmetdinov, one of the strongest Soviet masters. For some reason, he was very rarely allowed to go abroad, and obviously, he never became a grandmaster because of that.

As a consequence of living behind the "iron curtain" for many decades, he only left the USSR a total of three times.

Another popular explanation was the one advanced by Marat Khasanov:

Let us also consider the other Soviet Players who became GMs around the time Rashid should have (emphasis added) become one.

1954 - No player.

1955 - One player, Boris Spassky. He won the youth world chess championship and qualified for the Interzonal, where he got his grandmaster's norm. Boris was very lucky. The world championship in Antwerp ended on 8th August, and the Interzonal, which, luckily, was held in Gothenburg, began in a week - on 15th August. And Spassky got there in time, which, considering the Soviet bureaucracy of the time, was quite a feat.

1956 - One player, Viktor Korchnoi, by accumulated results, after winning at Hastings 1955/56.

1957 - One player, Mikhail Tal. He won the Soviet championship that year.

In 1958 and 1959, no Soviet players became grandmasters.

Therefore, in six years, from 1954 to 1959, only three Soviet players became grandmasters: Spassky, Tal and Korchnoi. How was Nezhmetdinov supposed to become a grandmaster if he never played in a tournament with grandmaster norms?

However, even without the title, Nezhmetdinov had a notable chess career, and a lifetime positive score against World Champions – an achievement that is usually exclusive to former world champions. Nezhmetdinov himself provided an explanation as well:

I came to chess too late, as a 17-year-old man with no theoretical knowledge, whereas all the champions — Botvinnik, Smyslov, Spassky, Petrosian and Tal received training from the age of seven or eight….Yes, I could play some games with brilliance, and win prizes for beauty, but I was never able to achieve the holistic skills necessary for Grandmaster level”

=== Results against world champions ===
Nezhmetdinov won a number of games against world champions such as Mikhail Tal, against whom he had a lifetime positive score, and Boris Spassky. He also had success against other world-class grandmasters such as David Bronstein, Lev Polugaevsky, and Efim Geller. He achieved a positive score in the 20 games he contested against World Champions. But in addition to his aforementioned dismal score against Averbakh, he could not win against excellent defenders like Tigran Petrosian (+0-3=2) and Korchnoi (+0-3=3).

== Notable games ==
- Nezhmetdinov vs. Mikhail Tal, USSR Championship 1961b, 1961, Round 15, Sicilian Defence, Scheveningen Variation (B84), 1-0.

One year after his opponent had become the world champion, Nezhmetdinov recorded a victory against Tal, using his own sacrificial style, giving up multiple pieces, including both his rooks to force resignation on the 29th move.

Nezhmetdinov vs Tal, USSR Championship

Position: a8 black rook, d8 black queen, b7 black bishop, g7 white queen, h7 black pawn, a6 black pawn, e6 black king, h6 white knight, b5 black pawn, f5 white pawn, f4 black pawn, a3 white pawn, b2 white pawn, c2 white pawn, g2 white bishop, h2 white pawn, g1 white king

Position after 29.gxf5+
1.e4 c5 2.Nf3 d6 3.d4 cxd4 4.Nxd4 Nf6 5.Nc3 e6 6.Be2 a6 7.O-O Qc7 8.f4 Nbd7 9.g4 b5 10.a3 Bb7 11.Bf3 Nc5 12.Qe2 e5 13.Nf5 g6 14.fxe5 dxe5 15.Nh6 Ne6 16.Bg2 Bg7 17.Rxf6 Bxf6 18.Nd5 Qd8 19.Qf2 Nf4 20.Bxf4 exf4 21.e5 Bxe5 22.Re1 f6 23.Nxf6+ Qxf6 24.Qd4 Kf8 25.Rxe5 Qd8 26.Rf5+ gxf5 27.Qxh8+ Ke7 28.Qg7+ Ke6 29.gxf5+ 1-0 (diagram)
- Lev Polugaevsky vs. Nezhmetdinov, Russian Championship, 1958, Sochi, Old Indian Defense (A53), 0-1.

In the midst of his record fifth Russian Chess Championship win, out of five attempts, Nezhmetdinov added another game against chess greats to his collection. From an Old Indian opening, Nezhmetdinov introduces imbalances and complications before locking the center and attacking his opponent in an example of a same-side castling attack, making multiple sacrifices, including a Queen sacrifice before walking his opponent's king to the other side of the board and forcing resignation.

Polugaevsky vs. Nezhmetdinov, Russian Championship

Position: d1 white queen, a1 white rook, h2 white rook, e2 white knight, b2 white bishop, g3 white pawn, f3 black rook, d3 black knight, b3 white pawn, g4 black pawn, a4 white pawn, d5 black pawn, a5 white king, c6 black knight, h7 black pawn, g7 black bishop, a7 black pawn, g8 black king, b8 black rook

Position after 33.Nc6+
1.d4 Nf6 2.c4 d6 3.Nc3 e5 4.e4 exd4 5.Qxd4 Nc6 6.Qd2 g6 7.b3 Bg7 8.Bb2 O-O 9.Bd3 Ng4 10.Nge2 Qh4 11.Ng3 Nge5 12.O-O f5 13.f3 Bh6 14.Qd1 f4 15.Nge2 g5 16.Nd5 g4 17. g3 fxg3 18.hxg3 Qh3 19.f4 Be6 20.Bc2 Rf7 21.Kf2 Qh2+ 22.Ke3 Bxd5 23.cxd5 Nb4 24.Rh1 Rxf4 25.Rxh2 Rf3+ 26.Kd4 Bg7 27.a4 c5+ 28.dxc6 bxc6 29.Bd3 Nexd3+ 30.Kc4 d5+ 31.exd5 cxd5+ 32.Kb5 Rb8+ 33.Ka5 Nc6+ 0-1 (diagram)

=== Memorial ===
Kazan Chess school is currently named after Rashid Nezhmetdinov.
