= Qьzьl Armies =

Tatar-language newspaper (1924–1938)

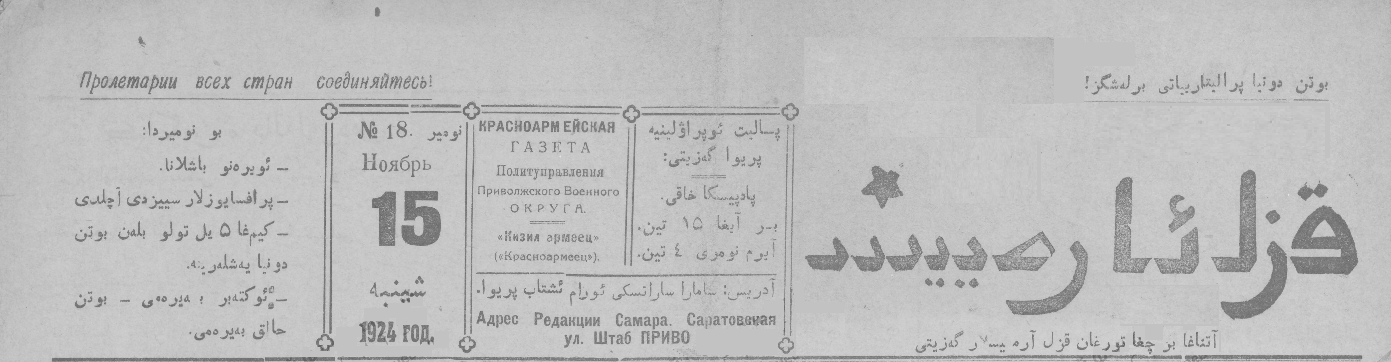
- 15 November 1924 masthead of Qьzьl Armies
- Native name: قزل ئارمييس
- Founded: 7 June 1924
- Ceased publication: 8 May 1938
- Political alignment: Communism
- Language: Tatar
- City: Samara (1924), Kazan (1925–1938)
- Country: Soviet Union
- Circulation: 1,400 (as of 1925)

Qьzьl Armies (Yaña imlâ: قزل ئارمييس, Cyrillic: Кызылармеец, romanized: Kyzylarmeec, lit. 'Red Army man') was a Tatar-language newspaper published in the Soviet Union from 1924 to 1938. The newspaper was an organ of the Political Directorate of the Volga Military District and was oriented towards Tatar speakers within the Red Army. Initially based in Samara, the publication was shifted to Kazan in 1925.

== In Samara ==
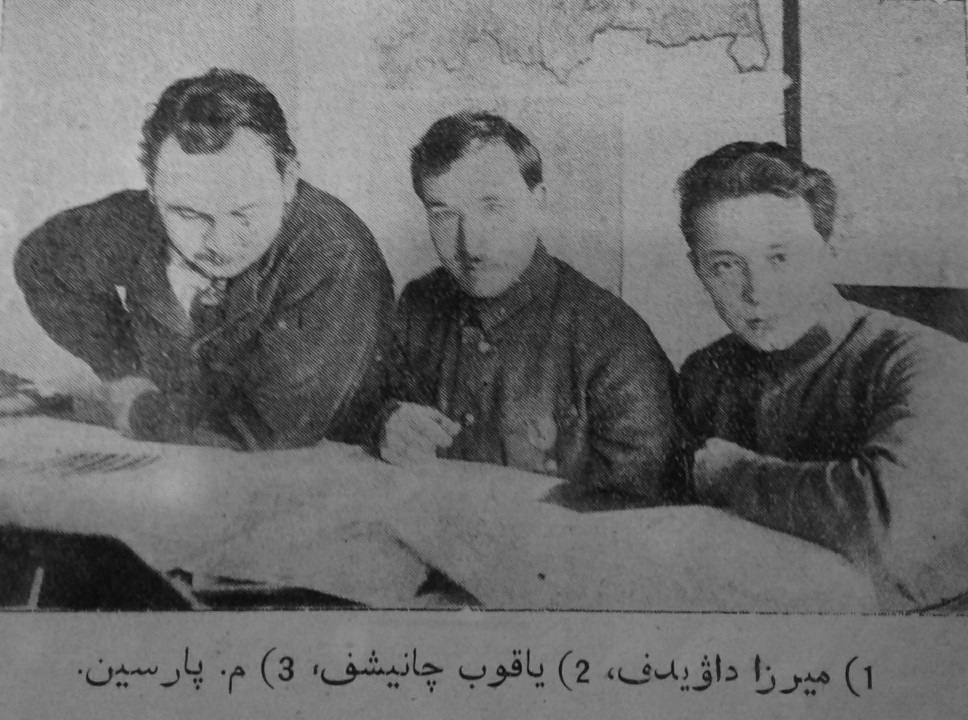
Editorial board members of Qьzьl Armies, from right to left: Mirza Davidov, Yaqub Chanyshev, Mikhail Parsin

Qьzьl Armies began to be published in the city of Samara in 1924 as the weekly Tatar-language organ of the Political Directorate of the Volga Military District. The first issue was published on 7 June 1924. The editorial board included F. Taipov, H. Kurmi and A. Shnitkov. The editorial office was located in the Red Army House on Saratovskaya Street.

Qьzьl Armies effectively replaced the now defunct newspaper Aul. Like Aul, Qьzьl Armies struggled with a lack of skilled newspaper workers. The newspaper had very few correspondents and did not manage to gain any substantial readership. The last issue of Qьzьl Armies published from Samara was its 18th issue (published on 15 November 1924).

== Move to Kazan ==
The newspaper moved to the city of Kazan. The first issue published from its new location came out on 23 February 1925. The newspaper was now a joint organ of the Political Directorate of the Revolutionary Military Council of the Volga Military District and the Tatar Regional Committee of the All-Union Communist Party (Bolsheviks). In the ongoing debates on replacing the Arabic script for writing Tatar language, the proponents of Latinization perceived the editorial team of the newspapers as opponents to the planned reform.

A new editorial team was set up consisting of Fatih Saifi, Yaqub Chanyshev and Mirza Davidov. Chanyshev and Davidov were military workers, with experience from other Red Army publications. After the shift to Kazan, the quality of the newspaper improved rapidly in terms of fonts and printing technology. The newspaper became a four-page weekly newspaper. It was distributed among Tatars within the Red Army within and outside Tatarstan, quickly increasing its circulation. Circulation stood at 1,400 in 1925. The network of correspondents of Qьzьl Armies grew, providing an increased flow of published notes sent in to the editorial office.

== Later period ==
Qawi Näcmi served as the executive editor of the newspaper from 1928 to 1933. Zakir Gali (Galiev) served as the editor-in-chief of Qьzьl Armies from 1934 to 1936. By 1928, the poet Nur Bayan worked at the literary section of the newspaper. In 1933, the poet Fatih Karim worked at the editorial office of Qьzьl Armies.

Between May 1929 and January 1933, the editorial office of Qьzьl Armies published the supplement Osoaviakhim, also in Tatar language. It functioned as the organ of Tatosoaviakhim, the Tatar ASSR branch of the Osoaviakhim movement. 124 issues of Osoaviakhim were published.

In May 1937, the newspaper became the organ of the Political Department of the Kazan Rifle Division named after the Tatar Central Executive Committee. On 30 November 1937 the last issue of Qьzьl Armies in Tatar language was published. A final issue of the newspaper was published on 8 May 1938 in Russian.
