= Kazan Conservatory =

Musical conservatory in Kazan, Russia

Kazan State Conservatory
- Казанская государственная консерватория имени Н.Г. Жиганова
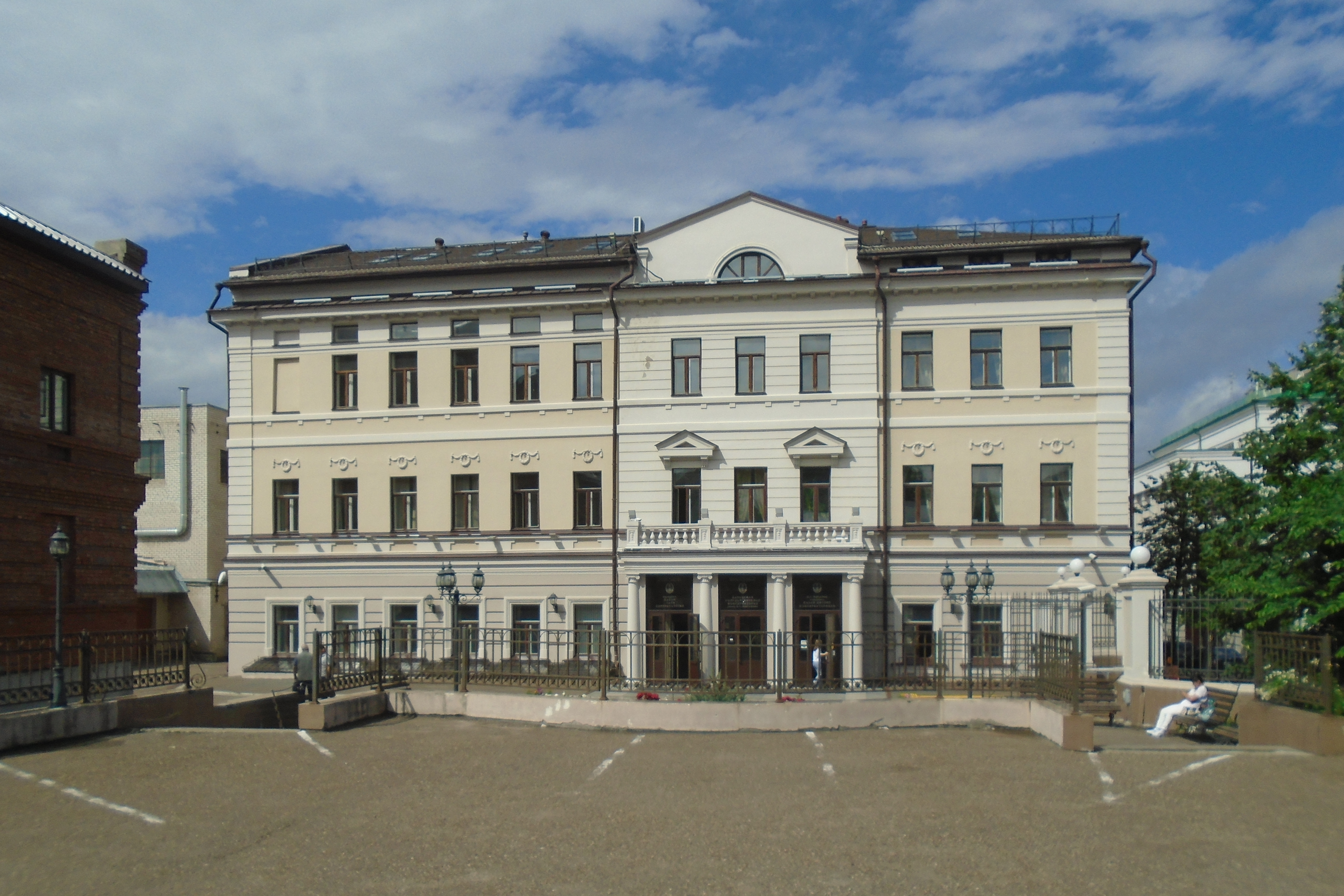
- Type: Music academy
- Established: 1945
- Students: 700
- Location: Kazan, Russia; 55°47′49″N 49°07′39″E
- Campus: Urban

The N.G. Zhiganov Kazan State Conservatory (Russian: Казанская государственная консерватория имени Н.Г. Жиганова) is a higher musical education institution in Kazan, Tatarstan, Russia. The conservatory was founded in 1945 by Soviet Tatar composer Najip Jihanov who was a rector of the institution during 1945-1988. In 2000 the Conservatory was named after him.

In 2009, the Conservatory had around 110 faculty members and 700 students. The educational programmes are realised at seven departments - piano, orchestra, choir conducting, vocal, folk instruments, theory and composition, Tatar musical art. Since 1989, the rector of the institution is professor Rubin Abdullin, the first organist of Tatar ethnicity. Since 2021, the rector of the institution is professor Vadim Dulat-Aleev.

== Notable faculty ==
- Najip Jihanov
- Albert Leman
- Fuat Mansurov
- Mansur Mozaffarov
- Natan Rakhlin
- Elf Burnasheva

== Notable alumni ==
- Vlada Borovko - operatic soprano
- Larissa Diadkova - mezzo-soprano (transferred to Saint Petersburg Conservatory)
- Youri Egorov - pianist (transferred to Moscow Conservatory)
- Sofia Gubaidulina - composer (1954)
- Oleg Lundstrem - jazz composer and conductor (1953)
- Almaz Monasypov - composer, conductor, and cellist.
- Airat Ichmouratov - composer, conductor, and clarinetist.
- Mikhail Pletnev - pianist, conductor, and composer (transferred to Moscow Conservatory)
