= Kugeze Mlande =

Nationalist party in Mari El advocating for its independence

Land of Forefathers Kugeze Mlande
- Registered: 1991
- Dissolved: 1995
- Newspaper: Eryk (Freedom)
- Membership (1995): 20
- Ideology: Mari Nationalism; Mari Independence
- Political position: Right-wing

Land of Forefathers (Mari: Kugeze Mlande) was a Mari nationalist organization founded in February 1991. The Party promoted Mari Independence. In March 1995 the organization was terminated by the Russian law enforcement agencies.

== History ==
In February 1990 Kugeze Mlande was formally registered. The aim of the organization was separating Mari El from Russia, adoption of harsh laws against migration into the Republic, and Mari membership within the proposed Volga Confederation.

In 1995, Kugeze Mlande was forced to cease its activities following its criticism of Vladislav Zotin, its call for Mari independence, and its opposition to the Chechen War.
