= Vatanym Tatarstan =

Russian Tatar-language newspaper

Ватаным Татарстан
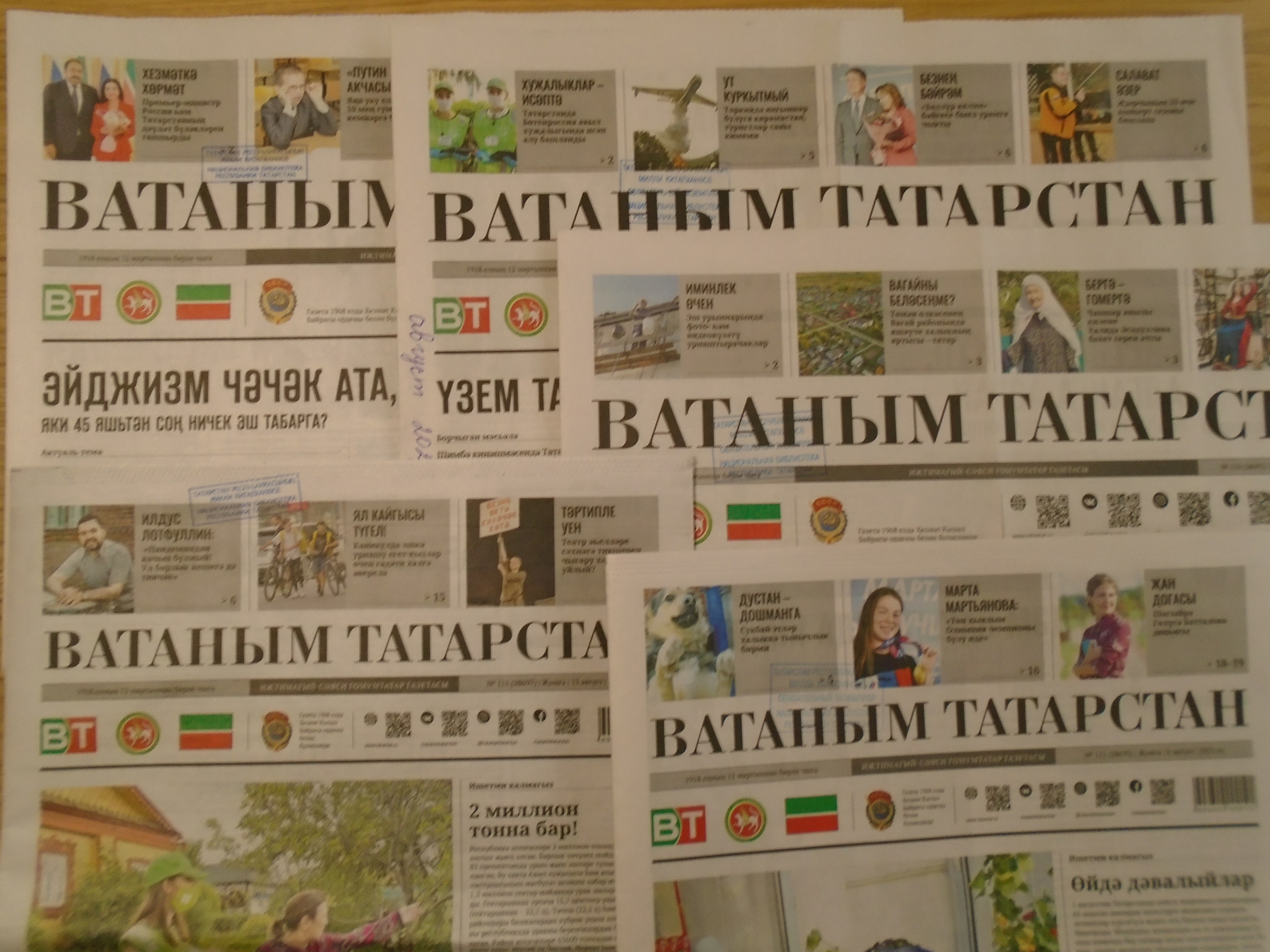
- Editor-in-chief: Sabirova Gölnara
- Founded: 1918
- Language: Tatar
- Headquarters: ul. Akademicheskaya 2, Kazan, Tatarstan
- Circulation: c. 18.000 (2015)
- Website: www.vatantat.ru

Vatanym Tatarstan (Tatar: Ватаным Татарстан; Our Homeland Tatarstan) is the main Tatar language newspaper, published in Kazan.

The paper first published in March 1918 as اش (Эш, Labour) by the Kazan Muslim Commissariat with Xäsän Urmanov and Şähit Äxmädiyev as its first editors. At first, the daily paper did not contain pictures and used the İske imlâ Arabic-based orthography, switching in 1920 to the Yaña imlâ orthography when it became تاتارستان خەبەرلەری (Татарстан хәбәрләре, Tatarstan News). From 1929 to 1939, as part of Soviet latinization efforts, the newspaper was published as Qzьl Tatarstan in the Yañalif orthography. In February 2022, it changed names to become Ватаным Татарстан (Vatanym Tatarstan).

Throughout its history, Vatanym Tatarstan focused on the social, political, and cultural issues in Tatarstan, and many influential Tatar journalists worked at the paper over the years, including Fatix Ämirxan, Musa Cälil, Äxmät İsxaq, and Ğäliäsğar Kamal. By 1970, its circulation had reached 175,000.

In 2010, the paper was redesigned with a more modern font and a greater emphasis on photographs. It generally distributed as a four-page A2 size paper and on Fridays as a 20-page A3 size paper. In 2019, Sabirova Gölnara was named editor-in-chief of the paper, the first woman to hold that title.

Previous names:

- 1918–1920: اش / Эш (Labour)
- 1920–1922: تاتارستان خەبەرلەری / Татарстан хәбәрләре (Tatarstan News)
- 1922–1924: تاتارستان / Татарстан (Tatarstan)
- 1924–1951: قزل تاتارستان / Qzьl Tatarstan / Кызыл Татарстан (Red Tatarstan)
- 1951–1960: Совет Татарстаны (Soviet Tatarstan)
- 1960–1992: Социалистик Татарстан (Socialist Tatarstan)
- 1992–now: Ватаным Татарстан (My Homeland Tatarstan)
