= Volga Confederation =

Post-Soviet proposals for a Confederation of Volga republics

Volga Confederation Поволжская Конфедерация (Russian) Идел Конфедерациясе (Tatar) Волга конфедерацияһы (Bashkir)
- Map of the Volga Federal District
- Status: Proposed Federation
- Government: Confederation or Federation
- History
  - Collapse of the USSR: 1991
  - Ural-Volga joint communiqué (First proposal): 1992
  - Kugeze Mlande merging with Mari Ushem (Last proposal): 1995
- Today part of: Russia: Volga Federal District

The Volga Confederation or Federation, sometimes the Ural-Volga Federation, refers to a series of movements aimed at forming a confederation or a federation of the Volga republics following the dissolution of the Soviet Union.

The potential founding republics included Tatarstan, Mari El, Mordovia, Bashkortostan, and Chuvashia.

== Background ==
In the 1980s, Mikhail Gorbachev's policies aimed to revitalize the Soviet system but instead accelerated its unraveling. Nationalist, democratic and liberal movements gained momentum across the Soviet republics, and the control of the Communist Party weakened.

In the Soviet Union, a Union Republic was a constituent federated political entity with a system of government called a Soviet republic, which was officially defined in the 1977 constitution as "a sovereign Soviet socialist state which has united with the other Soviet republics to form the Union of Soviet Socialist Republics"

The process of perestroika confirmed that de jure all Union republics have, constitutionally and in practice, the right to freely withdraw from the Soviet Union.

Throughout 1992 and early 1993, the process for drafting a new Russian constitution faced significant opposition. The republics rejected any draft that threatened their privileges and proceeded to declare themselves independent and searched for regional groupings, such as the Ural Republic, or a Volga Confederation.

== History ==
=== Tatar and Bashkir proposals ===
On 30 August 1990, Tatarstan declared its sovereignty with the Declaration on the State Sovereignty of the Tatar Soviet Socialist Republic and in 1992 held a referendum on the new constitution.

The idea of creating a Ural-Volga Confederation was supported in the adopted joint communiqué following the meeting in Kazan of representatives of the Tatar and Bashkir national movements in early December 1992.

In 1993, the Tatar parliament called for a new regional organization called the Volga Confederation, that, If realised, would give Tatarstan a border with Kazakhstan.

At the meeting of the Bashkir People's Center "Ural" and the Tatar Public Center of the Republic of Bashkortostan delegations on 20 November 1993, it was noted that the proposed draft of the Russian Constitution does not meet the principles of federalism of the peoples of the Volga-Ural region. The parties noted its instability and unpredictability, and came to the conclusion that it would be expedient to form a confederation of the republics of this region. However, the authorities of both republics did not express their positions on this issue.

In May 1994, during a press conference, Mintimer Shaimiev was asked about the future of federal relations. He stated that he considers the Federal Treaty and the bilateral agreement "Russia — Tatarstan" to be transitional documents. He also called the idea of creating a Volga Confederation centered around Tatarstan unviable, but did not rule out the possibility of its revival if unitarist tendencies in the Russian Federation continued growing.

Attitude of people of different nationalities to the plan to create the Ural-Volga Confederation (%)
| Nationality | Approve | Disapprove | Indifferent | Don't Know |
|---|---|---|---|---|
| Bashkirs | 22,4 | 26,2 | 13,5 | 37,9 |
| Tatars | 19,5 | 31,5 | 10,5 | 38,5 |
| Russians | 8,5 | 46,2 | 13,3 | 32 |

=== Mordovia ===
A small minority supported full independence of Mordovia within a Volga Federation before the removal of the President of Mordovia by the Supreme Soviet in April 1993. After 1993, the nationalist majority's support for economic and political autonomy in Russia was increasingly under pressure from the small but growing militant wing of the movement, which demanded reunification of the Mordvin lands in a sovereign state.

=== Mari El ===
In 1992, Mari Ushem organized the First Congress of the Mari Nation, which called for greater Mari representation in government. In 1993, a new, more radical organization, Kugeze Mlande, also became active. The movement advocated for limits on migration into Mari El and promoted secession and/or the formation of a Volga Federation independent of Russia, but failed to attract many adherents and was forced to merge with Mari Ushem by 1995.

=== Chuvashia ===
The Volga Federation was discussed within the Chuvash National Congress in Autumn 1993. Atner Khuzangai saw the federation as a path toward greater autonomy or eventual independence for Chuvashia through cooperation with other nationalist movements in Tatarstan and Bashkortostan. Centrists in the Congress preferred working within the existing Russian state system to achieve cultural revival and administrative influence.
