= Musa Cälil =

Soviet-Tatar poet and fighter (1906–1944)

- Муса Җәлил
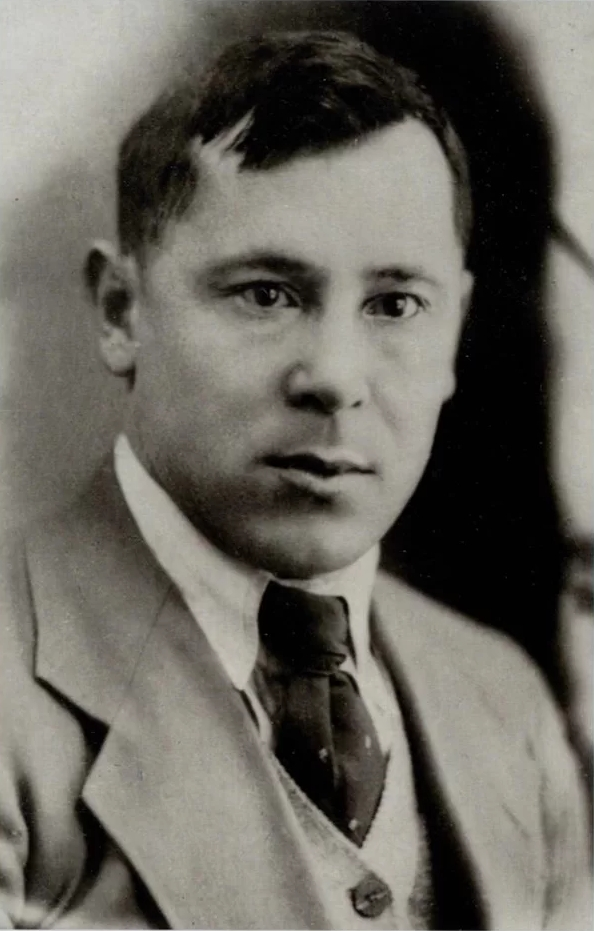
- Musa Cälil 1930s.
- Born: Musa Mostafa ulı Cälilev; 15 February [O.S. 2 February] 1906; Mustafino, Orenburg Governorate, Russian Empire
- Died: 25 August 1944 (aged 38); Plötzensee, Nazi Germany
- Occupations: Poet, playwright, journalist, editor, resistance fighter
- Spouse: Äminä Zalilova
- Children: Çulpan Zalilova
- Writing career
- Period: Interwar period
- Notable awards: Hero of the Soviet Union; Order of Lenin; Stalin Prize

Musa Cälil (Note: Also transliterated as Moussa Jalíl, Musa Celil, Musa Cəlil, Musa Çəlil, Mussa Djalil, Mussa Dshalil, Musa Dzhalil, Mussa Jalil, Mussa Jälil.) (Tatar: Муса Җәлил, Tatar pronunciation: [muˈsɑ ʑæˈlil]; Russian: Муса Джалиль, romanized: Musa Dzhalil; 15 February [O.S. 2 February] 1906 – 25 August 1944) was a Soviet Tatar poet and resistance fighter during World War II. He is the only poet of the Soviet Union awarded simultaneously the Hero of the Soviet Union award for his resistance fighting and the Lenin Prize for having written The Moabit Notebooks; both awards were bestowed upon him posthumously.

== Biography ==
=== Early life ===
Musa Cälil was born in Mustafino, a village in Orenburg Governorate, to a family of junk dealers. He graduated from Husainiya Madrasa (Note: also spelled Xösäyeniä) in Orenburg. His first published works were revolutionary verses. The Turkic aruz wezni poetic rhythm is seen in Cälil's early works, which is attributed to Gisyanism (ğıysyanizm; гыйсъянизм), a romantic poetic style celebrating revolution that was often found in young Tatar poetry of the 1920s. (Note: The word Gisyanism comes from the Arabic: عصيان, romanized: 'esyan, lit. 'rebellion'.) In 1919, he joined the underground Komsomol cell in Orenburg (the region was under the control of White Russians at that time). Then, Musa participated in the Russian Civil War against pro-White forces; due to his young age, he did not fight at the front, instead serving in a Red Army unit. In 1920, Cälil returned to his native village, establishing the pro-Communist youth organization The Red Flower there. He also became a Komsomol activist in Mustafino. He represented his village at the governorate Komsomol conference.

=== Literary life ===
In 1920, the Tatar ASSR was established and Kazan became its capital. In 1922, Musa, along with other Tatar poets, moved to Kazan. During this time, verses that he wrote include "The Red Host", "The Red Holyday", "The Red Hero", "The Red Way", "The Red Force", and "The Red Banner". In Kazan, Cälil worked as copyist for the Qьzьl Tatarstan newspaper and studied at rabfak of the Oriental Pedagogical Institute. He became acquainted with Tatar poets such as Qawi Näcmi, Hadi Taqtaş, and Ğädel Qutuy. In 1924, he became a member of the literary society October, backing Proletkult. Since that year, his poetry departed from Ghisyanism and aruz and turned to the Tatar folk verse. His first collection of verses, Barabız (We are going) was published in 1925. One concept that the verses dealt with was pre-revolutionary life.

During 1925 and 1926, Cälil became an instructor of Orsk uyezd Komsomol cell, where he visited Tatar and Kazakh auls, agitating for Komsomol there. In 1926, he became a member of Orenburg governorate Komsomol committee. In 1927, Musa moved to Moscow, where he combined his study in the Moscow State University and job in Tatar–Bashkir section of the Central Committee of Komsomol. Cälil joined the All-Union Communist Party (b) in 1929, which was the same year that his second collection, İptäşkä (To the Comrade; Yañalif: Iptəşkə) was published. Living in Moscow, Cälil met Russian poets Zharov, Bezymensky, and Svetlov; Cälil also attended Vladimir Mayakovsky's performances. He entered the Moscow Association of Proletarian Writers; he became its third secretary and a leader of its Tatar section. By the end of the 1920s, lyricism appeared in Cälil's poetry.

In 1931, Cälil graduated from the literature faculty of Moscow University. Until 1932, he was a chief editor of the Tatar children's magazine Keckenə iptəşlər, which was later renamed to Oktəbr Balasь (Little Octobrist). Then, he managed the section of literature and art in the central Tatar newspaper Kommunist. In 1934, Musa Cälil published two collections. The first of them, The Millions, Decorated with Orders was devoted mostly to youth and Komsomol, whereas the second, Verses and Poems, was a general compilation of his writing. However, a number of his lyrical poems weren't published due to being in conflict with Stalinism.

In 1935, the first Russian translations of his poems were published. During the 1930s, Cälil also translated to the Tatar language writings of poets of the USSR peoples, such as Shota Rustaveli, Taras Shevchenko, Pushkin, Nekrasov, Mayakovsky and Lebedev-Kumach. In the late 1930s, he tended to write epic poems, such as The Director and the Sun (1935), Cihan (1935–1938), and The Postman (1938). As a playwright of the Tatar State Opera, he wrote four librettos for Tatar operas, one of which is Altınçäç (Golden Hair Maiden) of Näcip Cihanov. In 1939 and 1940, he served as the chairman of the Tatar ASSR Union of Writers.

=== During World War II ===
After the Axis invasion of the Soviet Union in June 1941, Cälil volunteered for the Red Army. Graduating political commissar courses, he arrived at the Volkhov Front and became a war correspondent in the Otvaga newspaper. Cälil also wrote verse, which was at first patriotic but later evolving into lyricism concerning war and people experiencing war.

In June 1942, during the Lyuban Offensive Operation, Cälil's unit was encircled; when his unit tried to run a blockade he became seriously wounded, shell-shocked, and captured. After months in concentration camps for Soviet prisoners of war, including Stalag-340 in Daugavpils, Latvia and Spandau, Cälil was transferred to Dęblin, a fortified stronghold in German-occupied Poland. There, the Wehrmacht were assembling prisoners of Idel-Ural and Eastern nationalities in the camp. Cälil responded by forming a resistance group.

In late 1942, the Wehrmacht started forming what they called "national legions". Among others, the Idel-Ural legion was formed in Lager Jedlnia, General Government, consisting of prisoners of war belonging to the nations of the Volga basin. Since the majority of the legion were Volga Tatars, the Germans usually called it the Volga-Tatar Legion. The Wehrmacht began preparing the legionnaires for action against the Red Army. Cälil joined the Wehrmacht propaganda unit for the legion under the false name of Gumeroff. Cälil's group set out to wreck the National Socialist plans, to convince the men to use the weapons they would be supplied with against the National Socialists themselves. The members of the resistance group infiltrated the editorial board of the Idel-Ural newspaper, which the German command produced, and printed and circulated anti-Hitler leaflets among the legionnaires into esoteric action groups consisting of five men each. The first battalion of the Volga-Tatar Legion that was sent to the Eastern Front mutinied, shot all the German officers there, and defected to the Soviet partisans in Belarus.

==== Capture and death ====
On 10 August 1943, he was arrested with his comrades by the Gestapo and sent to Moabit Prison in Berlin. He sat in a cell with Belgian patriot and resistance fighter André Timmermans and a Polish prisoner. Cälil studied the German language in prison to communicate with his cellmates. In prison, he compiled verses composed in prison into self-made notebooks. He and his group of 12 were sentenced to death on 12 February 1944 and guillotined at Plötzensee Prison, Berlin, on August 25. His body was never recovered.

=== Prison notebooks ===
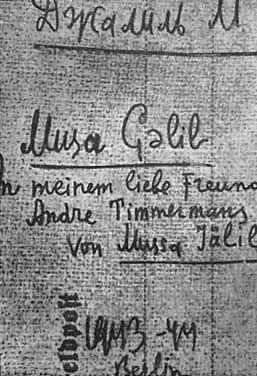
Moabit Notebooks title

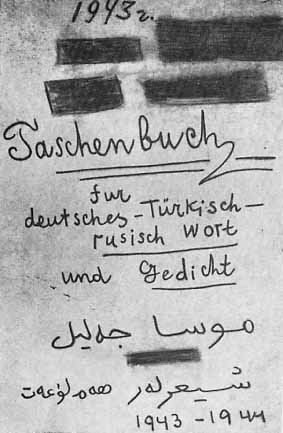
Moabit Notebooks title

Cälil's first notebook was preserved by the Tatars Ğabbas Şäripov and then Niğmät Teregulov, both of whom later died in Stalin's camps. Şäripov was also imprisoned in Moabit and received Cälil's and Abdulla Aliş's writings when the prison guards hid from bombing. To preserve the writings, Cälil's group fenced him off. The second notebook was preserved by the Belgian cellmate André Timmermans. Those notebooks were passed to the Tatar ASSR Union of Writers in 1946 and 1947 correspondingly. They were published as two books under the title Moabit Däftäre (The Moabit Notebook). Cälil's widow Äminä Zalyalova gave the originals to the National Museum of Tatarstan for safekeeping.

One notebook was brought to the Soviet embassy in Rome by the ethnically Tatar Turkish citizen Kazım Mirşan in 1946. However, this notebook was lost in the archives of SMERSH, and pursuits for it since 1979 have had no results. These notebooks were in arabic script.

== Legacy ==
In 1946, MGB opened a file on Musa Cälil, branding him as a traitor. In April 1947, his name was included in the list of wanted "dangerous criminals".

Then Tatar writers and the Tatarstan department of state security proved Cälil's underground work against the Third Reich and his death. In 1953, The Moabit Notebooks were published in Kazan and the Russian translation also was published in Literaturnaya Gazeta, owing to its editor, Konstantin Simonov. Musa Cälil was awarded the star of the Hero of the Soviet Union in 1956 and Literature Lenin Prize in 1957 for The Moabit Notebooks.

A monument to Musa Cälil is placed near the Kazan Kremlin; the museum in his flat was opened in Kazan in 1983. His poetry was popularized in the Soviet Union and the Warsaw Pact countries.

Soviet Tatar composer Nazib Zhiganov wrote an "opera-poem" Dzhalil based on the life of Cälil. This was premiered in Tatar in Kazan in 1957, and later recorded by conductor Boris Khaykin for Moscow radio.

Musa Cälil Tatar Library was opened in Constanța, Romania, in 2014.

The Symphony-poem "Musa Jalil" written by Soviet Tatar composer Almaz Monasypov in 1971 was dedicated to the poet. A minor planet 3082 Dzhalil discovered by Soviet astronomer Tamara Mikhailovna Smirnova in 1972 is named after him.

On October 13, 2021, a monument to Cälil had its grand opening in the Sverdlovsk Oblast within Yekaterinburg.

== Writings ==
1929	İptäşkä ("To the Comrade")
1934	Ordenlı millionnar ("The Millions Decorated with Orders")
1935–41	Altınçäç
1940	Xat taşuçı ("The Postman")
1940	İldar (opera libretto)
1943	Tupçı antı ("The Oath of the Artilleryman")
