= Vlada Borovko =

Russian operatic soprano (born 1988)

Vlada Borovko (born 1988) is a Russian operatic soprano. In 2016, she sang Violetta, the lead role in La traviata, at the Royal Opera House, Covent Garden.

== Early life ==
Borovko was born in 1988, in Kazan, the birthplace of Feodor Chaliapin, and attended the Children's Art School No. 13 in Chelny, where she first studied singing in a school choir. Borovko studied languages, specializing in English, at the Linguistics University of Nizhny Novgorod. After graduating, she applied to study operatic singing at the Kazan State Conservatory, under the tutelage of Galina Trofimova Lastovka, a recipient of the People's Artist of the Republic of Tatarstan and Honored Artist of Russia. After studying for five years, she entered an international competition in Budapest, winning an invitation to sing the premiere at the Bartok Opera Festival in 2014. She then entered the international competition to compete for an internship at Covent Garden, winning a two-year contract. Out of 370 competitors from 59 nations, five were awarded with contracts to become members of The Royal Opera's Jette Parker Young Artists Programme.

== Career ==
She made her debut at the Royal Opera House in March 2016 by stepping into the role of Violetta in La traviata at one hour's notice. She then sang the role of Clotilde in Bellini's Norma in several productions from September to October 2016, where she was recognised as "a rising soprano with a solid technique to listen out for, rounding out her character with skilled yet subtle acting ability". The Guardian described her performance in Oreste in November 2016 as "show-stopping" and said that she "brought the house down with her furious demisemiquavers".
