= Näcip Cihanov =

Soviet and Tatar composer, pedagogue and statesman

- Нәҗип Җиһанов
- Cihanov in 1947
- Born: January 15, 1911; Uralsk, Russian Empire (present-day Oral, Kazakhstan)
- Died: June 2, 1988 (aged 77); Ufa, Russia
- Other name: Nazib Gayazovich Zhiganov
- Occupations: Composer, pedagogue, statesman

Näcip Ğayaz ulı Cihanov (Note: Tatar: Нәҗип Гаяз улы Җиһанов, romanized: Năjip Gaiaz uly Jiḣanov, [næˈʑip ɣʌˌjɑzuˈlɯ ʑiˈhɑnəf]) (15 January [O.S. 2 January] 1911 – 2 June 1988, russified: Nazib Gayazovich Zhiganov) (Note: Russian: Назиб Гаязович Жиганов, romanized: Nazib Gayazovich Zhiganov) was a Soviet and Tatar composer, pedagogue and statesman. He was born in Uralsk; and died in Ufa.

Cihanov wrote eight operas (notably Altınçäç and Cälil), three ballets, 15 symphonies, other symphonic works (Qırlay, Suite on Tatar Themes, Näfisä, Symphonic novellas, and Symphonic Songs among them), the cantata Republic of Mine (1960), camera-instrumental compositions, and romances and songs.

Granted the titles of People's Artist of the USSR (1957) and Hero of Socialist Labour (1981), Cihanov served as artistic leader of the Tatar Opera and Ballet from 1941 to 1943, chairman of Tatarstan's Composers Union from 1939 to 1977, and rector of Kazan Conservatory from 1945 to 1988. He was made professor in 1953; Kazan Conservatory was renamed in his honor in 2000. Importantly, Cihanov was one of the founders of the State Symphony Orchestra of Tatarstan. In his capacity as statesman, he served as a deputy in the Supreme Soviet of RSFSR (1951–1959), the Tatar ASSR (1963–1967, 1977–1988), and indeed the Soviet Union (1966–1970).

== Operas ==
- Qaçqın (1939)
- İrek (1940) "Freedom"
- Altınçäç (1941) "The golden-haired girl"
- İldar (1942)
- Tüläk (1945)
- Namus (1950) "Honour"
- Cälil (1957) based on the life of poet Musa Cälil.
