= Qawi Näcmi =

Qawi Näcmi Кави Нәҗми Кави Наджми
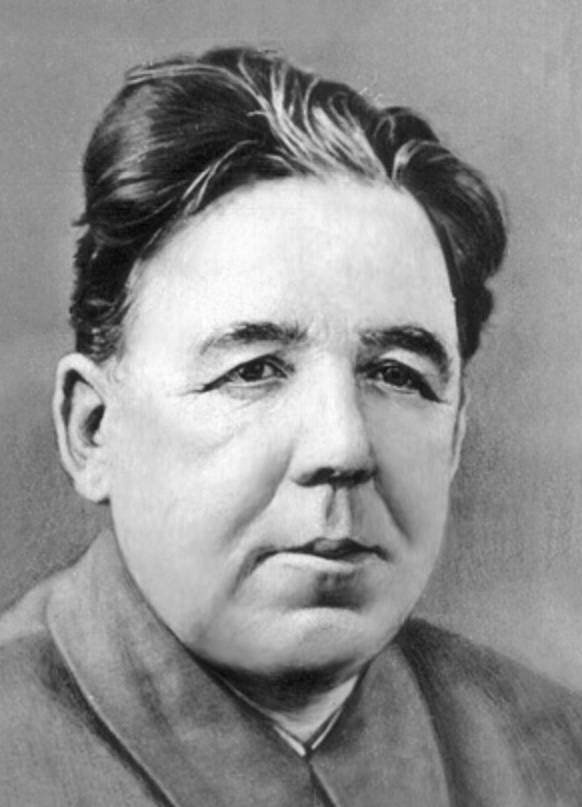
- Born: Ğabdelqawi Hibät ulı Näcmetdinov (Габделкави Һибәт улы Нәҗметдинов); 15 December 1901; Simbirsk Governorate, Russian Empire
- Died: 24 March 1957 (aged 55); Kazan, Tatar ASSR, Russian SFSR, Soviet Union
- Relatives: Rashid Nezhmetdinov (brother)

Qawi Näcmi (Tatar: Кави Нәҗми, Габделкави Нәҗметдинов, Ğabdelqawi Näcmetdinov, عبدالقوى نجمالدينوف, قوى نجمى, Russian: Кави Наджми / Габдулкави Гибятович Нежметдинов, romanized: Kavi Nadzhmi / Gabdulkavi Gibyatovich Nezhmetdinov; 15 December 1901 – 24 March 1957) was a Soviet-Tatar poet, novelist, translator, and journalist. From his work Yazğı cillär (“Spring Winds”), Näcmi received the Stalin Prize in 1951. The novel was recognized as "a great achievement of multinational Soviet literature and translated into 26 languages of the Soviet people".

== Biography ==
Qawi Näcmi (Näcmetdinov) was born on December 15 [O.S. December 2] 1901, in the village of Qızıl Ataw (Krasny Ostrov) in a muezzin's family. From 1910 he lived in Aktyubinsk, where his parents moved; he worked as a laborer on a farm (1913–1915), then as a packer at a soap factory (1916–1917). Here in 1917 he graduated from the Russian-Tatar school.

In 1917–1919, he worked as a teacher in his native village. In 1919–1939, Qawi Näcmi was a Red Army soldier, cadet, teacher, commissar of a military school and executive editor of the Кызылармеец, the district Red Army newspaper. In 1933–1934 was the chief editor of Sovyet ädäbiyätı (Совет әдәбияты) magazine.

At the First All-Union Congress of Soviet Writers in 1934, Näcmi was elected a member of the board of the Union of Soviet Writers. In 1934–1937, he was the first chairman of the board of the Union of Writers of Tatar Autonomous Soviet Socialist Republic. Since 1937 he was a professional writer.

Removed from all positions and arrested in 1937 on charges of "preparing a military counter-revolutionary rebellion". Sentenced to 10 years in prison, but in 1939 the case was dismissed for lack of evidence, and Näcmi was released.

In 1942–1945 worked as head of the agitation and propaganda department of the Tatar Republican Committee for Radio and Broadcasting under the Council of People's Commissars of the TASSR, and in 1947–1949 in the editorial office of Sovyet ädäbiyätı magazine.

Qawi Näcmi died on March 24, 1957, in Kazan. He was buried at Kazan's Novosibirsk Cemetery next to Salix Säydäş and Qayum Nasıyri.

== Works ==
Collections of poems: Öyermälär (Өермәләр, Whirlwinds, 1925), Atakağa (Атакага, To the Attack, 1942), novels: Şobağa (Шобага, Lot, 1926), Yar buyındağı uçaqlar (Яр буендагы учаклар, Coastal Fires, 1929, both about the Civil War in Russia), Yaqtı suqmaq (Якты сукмак, Bright Path, 1926), about collectivization), the historical-revolutionary novel Yazğı cillär (Язгы җилләр, Spring Winds, 1950; for the last one he was awarded Stalin Prize in 1951).

Translated into Tatar works of Alexander Pushkin, Mikhail Lermontov, Alexander Blok, Samuil Marshak, Ivan Franko and others; also translated Musa Сälil's Moabit Notebooks into Russian.

Näcmi's complete works in 4 volumes were published in 1981–1984.

== Family and relatives ==
Qäwi Näcmi was married to Särwär Ädhämeva, also a writer and translator. Their son, Tansıq, was a university professor. Näcmi's brother Räşit was a renowned chess player, better known as IM Rashid Nezhmetdinov.

His uncle, Ğabdulla, was an imam and State Duma deputy.
