= Hadi Taqtaş =

Soviet-Tatar poet, writer and publicist

- Born: Mɵxəmməthadi Xəyrulla ulı Taqtaşev; 1 January 1901 [O.S. 19 December 1900] Sırqıdı, Tambov Governorate, Russian Empire
- Died: December 8, 1931 (aged 30); Kazan, Tatar ASSR, Soviet Union
- Burial place: Gorky Park, Kazan, Tatarstan, Russia
- Occupations: poet; dramatist
- Spouses: Gulchira Khamzina; Gulchira Mansurova-Taktasheva (m. 1930)

Möxämmäthadi Xäyrulla ulı Taqtaşev better known as Hadi Taqtaş (Note: Also Romanized as Hadi Taktash or Khadi Taktash) (Tatar: Һади Такташ, Tatar pronunciation: [hʌˈdɯɪ tʌqˈtaʃ]; Russian: Хади Такташ; 1901–1931) was a Soviet–Tatar poet, writer and publicist.

His early verses have a tendency to symbolism: romantic ballades Газраилләр (The Azraels, 1916), Үтерелгән пәйгамбәр (The Killed Prophet, 1918), tragedy verse Җир уллары (The Sons of the Earth, 1923), poems Гасырлар һәм минутлар (The Centuries and The Minutes, 1924), Мәхәббәт тәүбәсе (The Oath of Love, 1927), Алсу (1929), Киләчәккә хатлар (The Letters to the Future, 1931). His innovative poem Мокамай (1929) and verse Урман кызы (The Forest Girl, 1922) had unusual rhythmic system for the Tatar verse before Taqtaş. He also wrote several dramas, Күмелгән кораллар (The Buried Weapons, 1927), Югалган матурлык (The Lost Beauty, 1929), Камил (1930). He also wrote several publicist articles. The complete publishing of his writings issued after his death include Әсәрләр (1-3 t. 1980–1983), Истәлекләр, шигерләр (2001).
