= Fauziya Bayramova =

Tatar writer and politician

- Фәүзия Бәйрәмова; Fäwziyä Bäyrämova
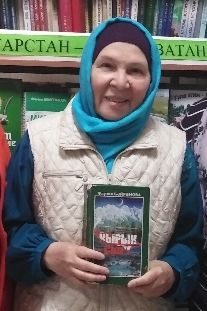
- Bayramova in 2019

Member of the State Council of the Republic of Tatarstan
- In office 1990–1995

Chair of the Milli Majlis
- In office 1994–1997

Personal details
- Born: 5 December 1950 (age 75) Sabayevo, Bashkir ASSR, Russian SFSR, Soviet Union (now Bashkortostan, Russia)
- Occupation: Politician; Activist; Writer; Historian

Fauziya Aukhadiyevna Bayramova (Tatar: Фәүзия Әүхәди кызы Бәйрәмова, romanized: Fäwziyä Äwxädi qızı Bäyrämova; born 5 December 1950) is a Tatar politician and writer. She was a founder of the Tatarstan independence party The Ittifaq Party. From 1990 to 1995 she was a member of the State Council of the Republic of Tatarstan. From 1994 to 1997 she was the chair of the Milli Majlis, the unrecognized Tatar parliament, which she helped to establish. She was also a contributor to the constitution of Tatarstan. She has written a number of political manifestos and histories, focusing on topics relating to the Tatar people and their political circumstances, and has worked as a journalist and publisher.

== Life and career ==
Bayramova was born on 5 December 1950 in Sabay, Tatarstan. She attended theatre school in Kazan, and then from 1983 to 1989 she studied philology at the Kazan Federal University. After graduating from university she worked for a television station in Kazan. She then worked at a publishing house, followed by a variety of journalism jobs at several newspapers and magazines. She earned the equivalent of a doctoral degree in history, namely a Candidate of Sciences degree, specializing in the history of Tatars in the early 20th century.

In 1988, Bayramova joined the All-Tatar Public Center, which advocates increased autonomy for Tatarstan and promotes the Tatar language. In 1990, Bayramova founded the Tatar nationalist party The Ittifaq Party, a pro-independence party in Tatarstan. She led the party for more than 20 years, and she was involved in publishing the party newspaper Altın Urda from 1993 to 1998. In 1991 she held a two week long hunger strike to protest the holding of Russian presidential elections in Tatarstan, which helped to spark a large protest movement against the Russian elections being held there. The elections were canceled in response to the protests.

From 1990 to 1995, Bayramova was a member of the regional parliament of Tatarstan. After the founding of the Milli Majlis in 1991, she worked as its chair from 1994 to 1997.

In addition to her political activities and activism, Bayramova is also notable for her work as a writer. In 1986 she was admitted to the Union of Soviet Writers, and in 1994 she became a member of the Writers' Union of Tatarstan. Her writing focuses on the political issues confronting Tatar people and their history, though her works include fiction and art criticism. She has written a number of political manifestos, and she was a contributor to the Constitution of Tatarstan. She has also written histories of the Tatar people which seek to emphasize their historical unity as a cohesive ethnic group.

In 2014, Bayramova was charged with inciting ethnic hatred following her condemnation of the 2014 Russian Annexation of Crimea on Facebook. She was found guilty and given a suspended 1-year prison term.

The Tatar Gazette has argued that Bayramova has been the most prominent woman in Tatar politics since Söyembikä of Kazan, noting that her uncompromising ethnic nationalism contrasted strongly with Tatar politicians like Mintimer Shaimiev who came to power within the Russian state through willingness to compromise.
