= Culture of Tatarstan =

The culture of Tatarstan is molded from the culture of Volga Tatar people, Russian, and European culture.

== Education ==
The education system in Tatarstan is secular. The literacy rate for the total population is about 100%. Elementary and secondary education is compulsory (grades 1–10). Students must pass graduation exams at the end of the 10th grade to continue their education in colleges and universities. Most schools are public along with a small number of parochial schools run by churches or mosques. The school year begins in September. Kazan State University is one of the major centers of higher education in Russia.

== Music ==
Traditional (folk) Tatar music is based on the pentatonic scale. The first Tatar opera was staged in 1925. It was composed by Sultan Gabyashi in collaboration with Vasili Vinogradov. Farit Yarullin was the creator of the first Tatar ballet, known as Şüräle. Modern Tatar music includes practically all existing musical genres.

== Theater ==
There are 16 professional and dozens of amateur theaters in Tatarstan performing plays in Tatar, Russian, and other local languages.

== Cinema ==
In 1924, Tatarkino (Tatarcinema), a government company for making documentaries, feature films and others, was created in Kazan.

== Libraries ==
Major libraries include the Science Library of Kazan State University and the National Library of the Republic of Tatarstan. There are two museums of republican significance, as well as 90 museums of local importance.

== Religion ==
In Tatarstan, religion and the state are separate from each other, although as in the rest of Russia, religious authorities are subordinated to the state. The most common faiths are Sunni Islam and Russian Orthodoxy. As of 2004, there were 1,208 buildings used for religious purposes in Tatarstan; 1,014 of which were Islamic, and 176—Russian Orthodox.
