= Idel-Ural =

Historical region in the southern Urals in Russia

Idel-Ural at the center of the Volga (Privolzhsky) Federal District

Idel-Ural (Tatar: Идел-Урал, romanized: Idel-Ural, Russian: Идель-Урал), literally Volga-Ural, is a historical region in Eastern Europe, in what is today Russia. The name literally means Volga-Urals in the Tatar language. The frequently used Russian variant is Volgo-Uralye (Russian: Волго-Уралье). The term Idel-Ural is often used to designate 6 republics of Russia of this region: Bashkortostan, Chuvashia, Mari El, Mordovia, Tatarstan, and Udmurtia, especially in Tatar-language literature or in the context of minority languages.

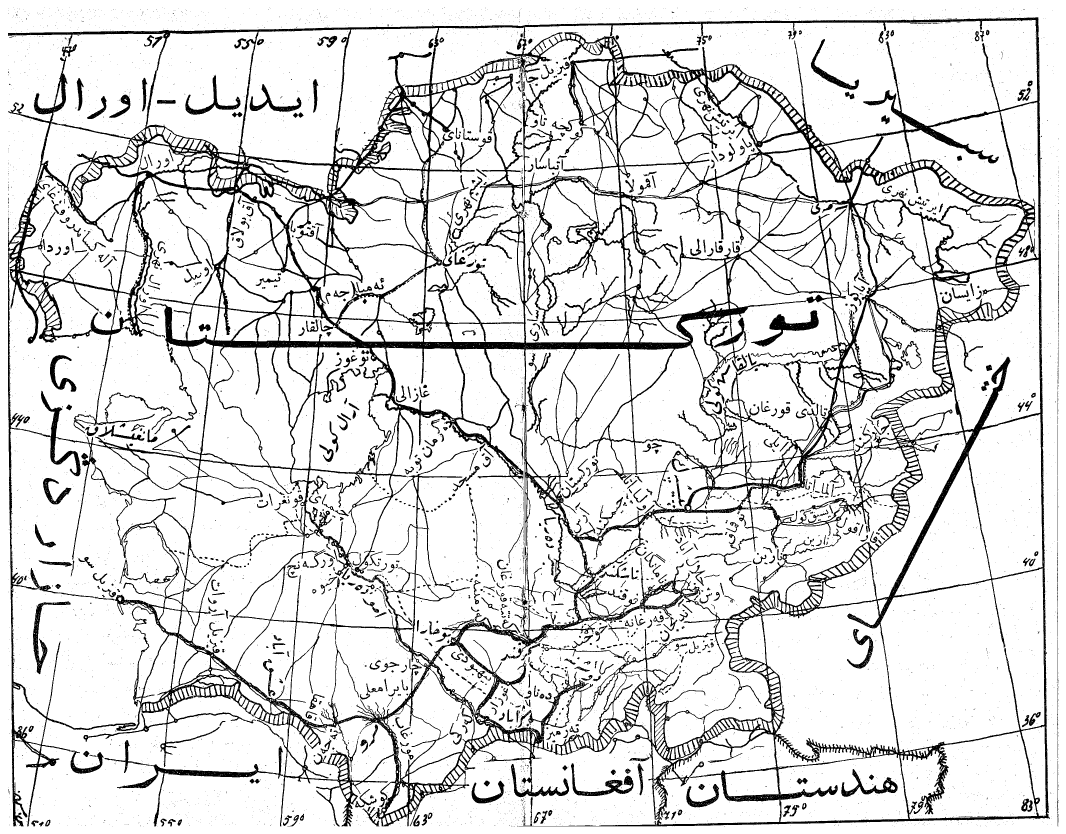
Chaghatay-language map depicting Idel-Ural (ایدیل-اورال) neighboring Turkestan (تورکستان), from the November 1931 issue of the Berlin-based Yash Turkistan magazine

Idel-Ural is at the center of the Volga Federal District (Поволжье, Povolzhye). The major religions in the region are Islam and Orthodox Christianity.

== History ==
Before being conquered by the Tsardom of Russia in the 16th century, the region was dominated by native Uralic tribes and a succession of Turkic-led empires, such as Volga Bulgaria, the Khazars, the Golden Horde, and the Khanate of Kazan. At the time of Peter the Great's death, in the early 18th century, the region had been made up of roughly 1 million people, with around half being Tatars, Bashkirs, and Chuvash.

== See also ==
- Idel-Ural State
- Idel-Ural Legion
- Free Idel-Ural
- Volga Confederation
