= Idel-Ural Legion =

Idel Ural Legion
- Wolgatatarische Legion; Идел-Урал Легионы
- One of the variants of the Idel Ural Legion patch
- Active: 1942–1945
- Country: Nazi Germany
- Type: Ostlegionen
- Size: 40,000 troops
- Engagements: World War II

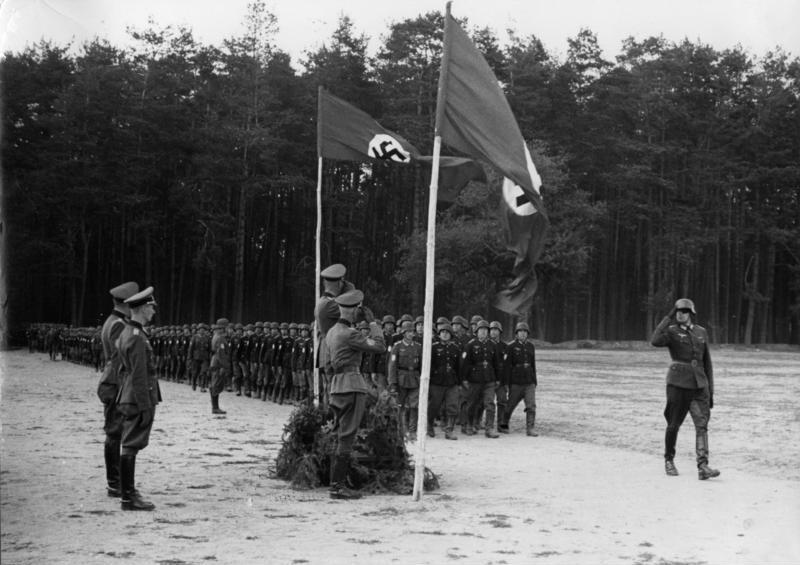
Group of Tatar soldiers marching in front of their German officers

The Volga-Tatar Legion (German: Wolgatatarische Legion) or Idel-Ural Legion (Tatar: Идел-Урал Легионы, romanized: İdel-Ural Legionı) denoted a series of units within the Wehrmacht in World War II. It was recruited among Muslim Volga Tatars in the Soviet Union, but also included other Idel-Ural peoples, including Bashkirs, Chuvashes, Maris, Udmurts, Erzyas, and Mokshas. Germany promoted the Idel-Ural Legion as evidence that Muslim and Christian peoples of Volga Bulgarian descent were opposed to Russia and Bolshevism, but they also wanted to spare German blood.

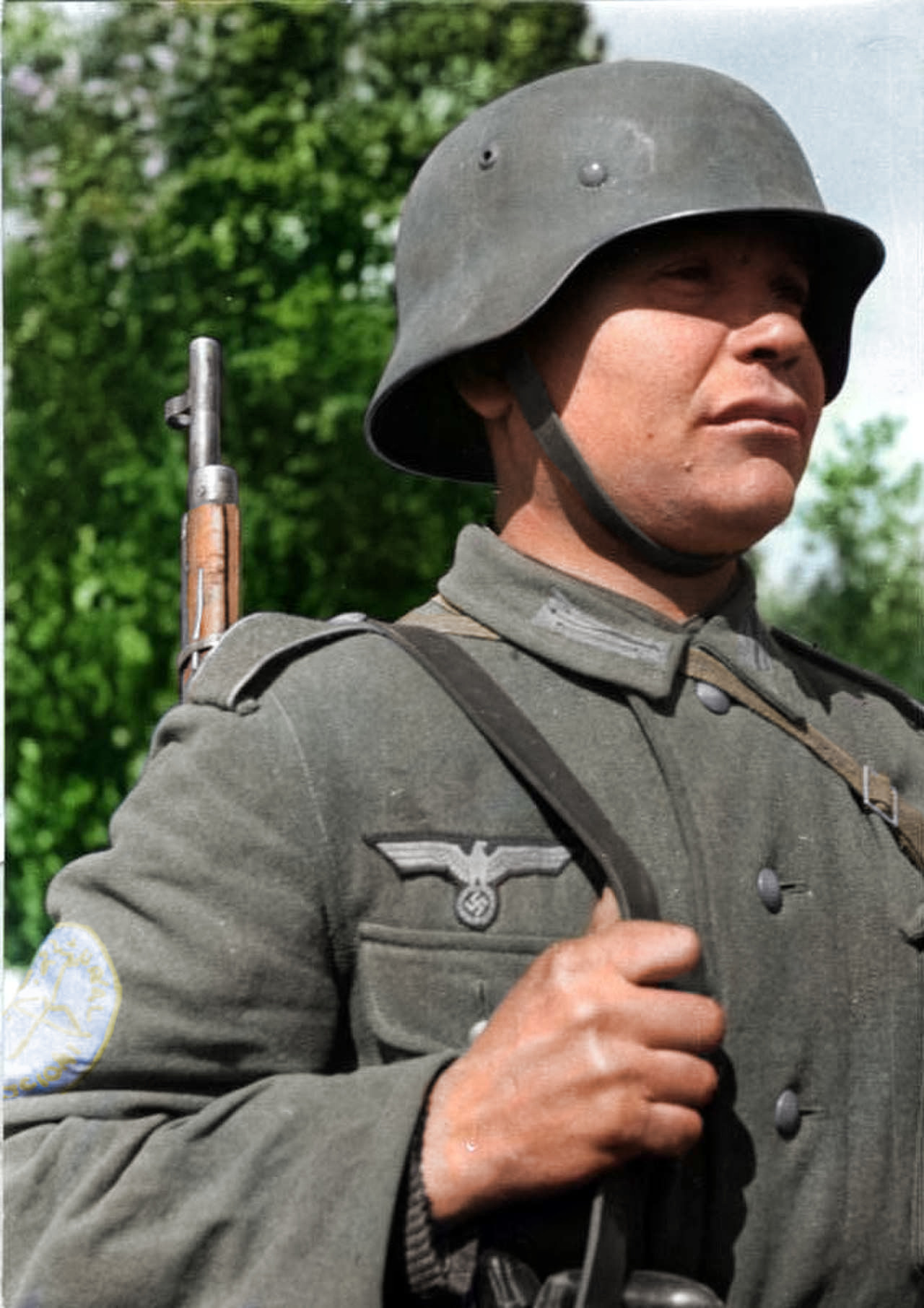
A Volga Tatar soldier of Idel-Ural legion (colorized)

The legion was established in 1942 and comprised around 12,500 men, spread over seven battalions numbered 824 to 831. On 23 February 1943, near Vitebsk, Belarus, the entire 825th Battalion (about 900 soldiers) went over to the partisans. One of the most notable members of the legion was Soviet–Tatar poet Musa Cälil, who was later executed by the Gestapo for sabotage. Tamurbek Dawletschin always denied involvement with the legion, but historian Sebastian Cwiklinski found that Dawletschin was one of the founders of the legion's newspaper, Idel-Ural.

== Description ==
=== Ideological basis ===
The formal ideological basis of the legion was the fight against Bolshevism and Jews, with the German side deliberately spreading rumours about the possible creation of the Idel-Ural Republic. Emigrants — members of national committees formed under the auspices of the Reich Ministry for the Occupied Eastern Territories — played a leading role in the ideological training of legionnaires. Prominent figures of the national movements of the period 1918–1920, such as Shafi Almas, were particularly popular among them. The camps of Muslim legionnaires were repeatedly visited by the Mufti of Jerusalem, Haj Amin al-Husseini, who called for a holy war against the ‘infidels’ in alliance with Germany. The Muslim legions introduced the position of mullah, who sometimes combined religious functions with command functions, serving as platoon commanders. The military and political training of soldiers was completed with a collective oath to Hitler and the presentation of a flag. In 1942, the newspaper Utro Kavkaza published a statement by Tatar legionnaires that ‘until the enemy of New Russia — Bolshevism — is destroyed,’ they would not lay down their arms. It should also be noted that the Idel-Ural Legion had its own march. Yarullin Zagidulla's ‘March of Tukay’ was always played before all events. Surah from the Koran were read.

German generals and scientists were present at the Idel-Ural kurultai and gave speeches. For example, one of the legion commanders, Colonel Ralph von Heygendorff, spoke in his speech about the eternal friendship between Germans and Tatars, saying that only through joint struggle would it be possible to defeat the Bolsheviks, and that the Tatars would sooner or later gain independence:

I believe that this kurultai will strengthen German-Tatar friendship and joint projects, and that the newly created union of national struggle will breathe a fighting spirit into the Tatar legionnaires. But we must not forget that only with Germany's victory can the Tatar people look forward to a happy future.

He then proceed to say in his speech:

After that, our friends from the Volga-Ural region will have the opportunity to return to their homeland, to their families, liberated from the yoke of Bolshevism with the help of Germany's military might. Now, during the war, we stand shoulder to shoulder as brothers, but when the war is over, the friendship between Germany and the Tatar people will continue.

== See also ==
- Ostlegionen
