= 2025 Tatar head election =

- 14 September 2025
- Turnout: 75.81% ▼2.93 pp
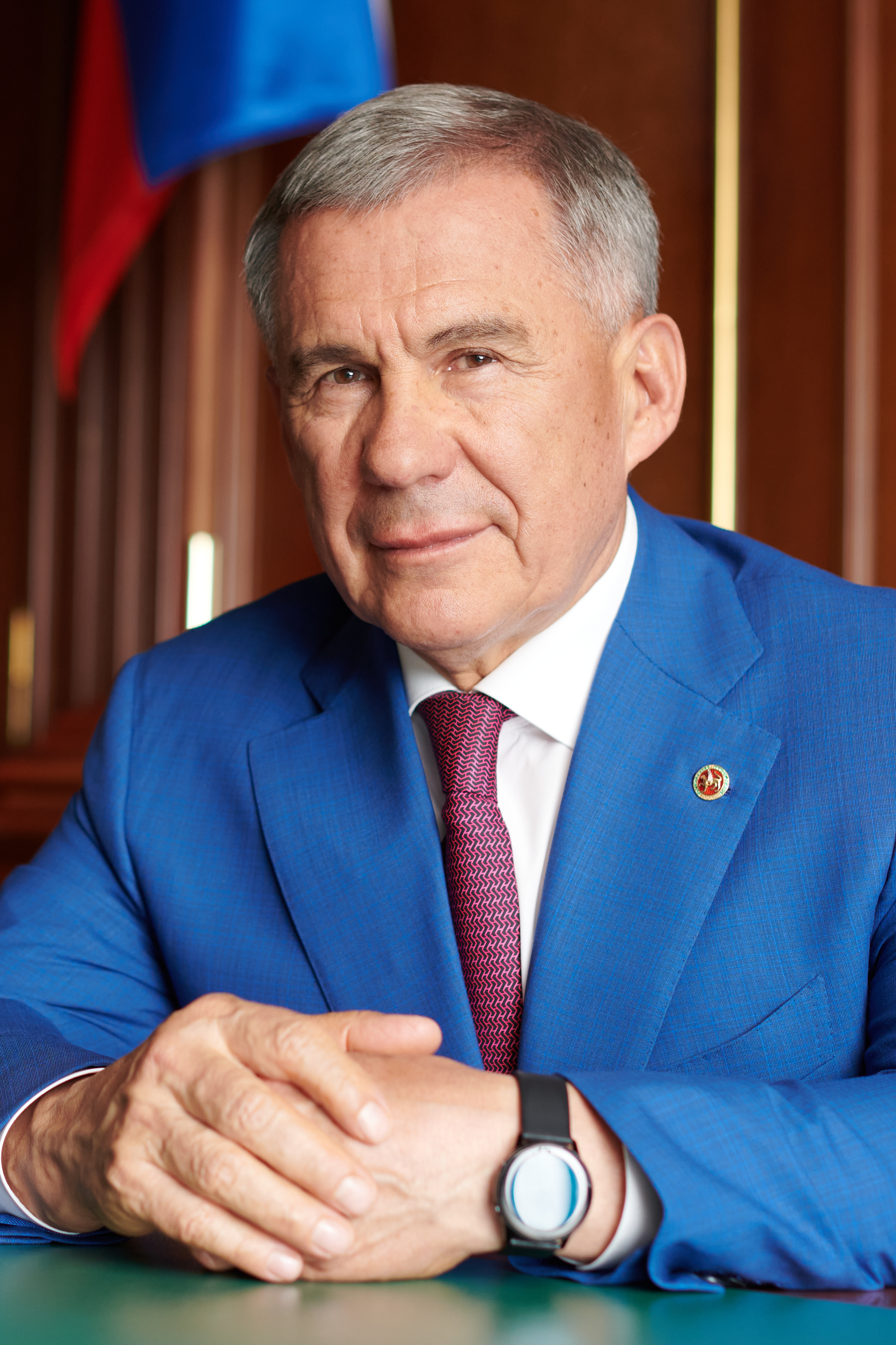

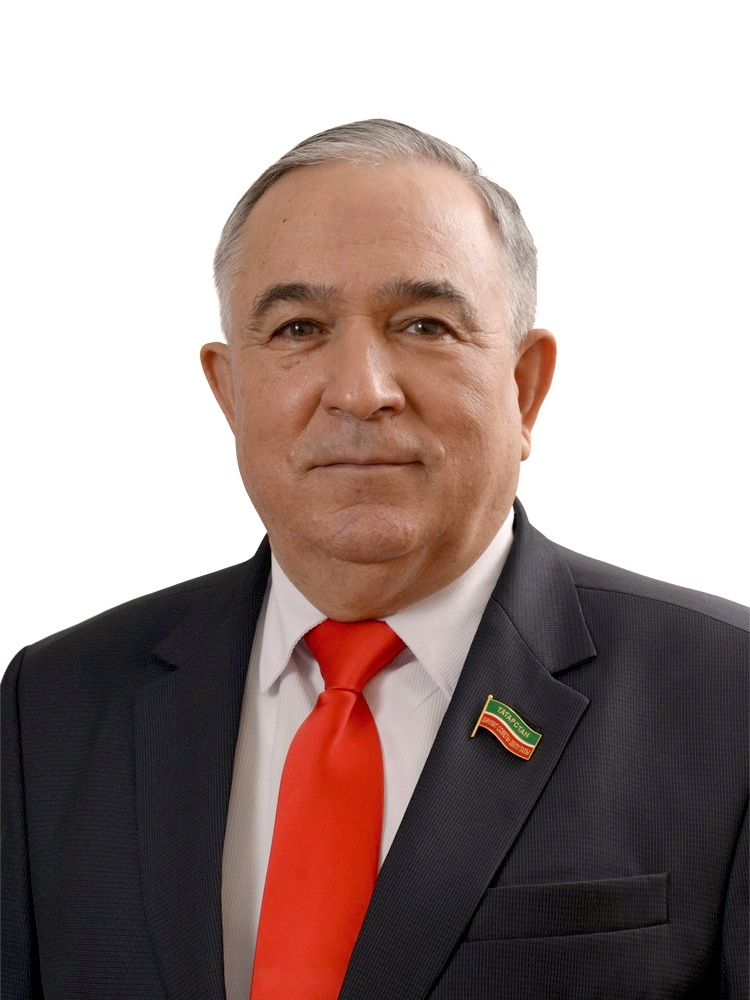
Candidate	Rustam Minnikhanov	Khafiz Mirgalimov
Party	United Russia	CPRF
Popular vote	1,963,583	110,734
Percentage	88.09%	4.97%
Head before election
Rustam Minnikhanov
United Russia
Head-elect
Rustam Minnikhanov
United Russia

The 2025 Republic of Tatarstan head election took place on 14 September 2025, on common election day, to elect the head (rais) of Tatarstan. Incumbent head Rustam Minnikhanov was re-elected to a fourth term in office.

== Background ==
Then-Prime Minister of Tatarstan Rustam Minnikhanov was elected President of Tatarstan by the State Council of the Republic of Tatarstan in March 2010 after incumbent Mintimer Shaimiev declined to seek a fifth term. Minnikhanov won the subsequent direct presidential elections in 2015 and 2020 with 94.40% and 83.27% of the vote respectively. In February 2023 State Council of Tatarstan renamed the position of "President of the Republic of Tatarstan" as "Head (Rais) of the Republic of Tatarstan", in accordance with the federal law after initial reluctance of the Tatar authorities.

Initially the Head of the Republic of Tatarstan was limited for just two consecutive terms so Minnikhanov would have been term-limited in 2025 (as his 2015–2020 would have been counted as first since the re-introduction of direct gubernatorial elections). However, in December 2021 "On Common Principles of Organisation of Public Authority in the Subjects of the Russian Federation" law was enacted (coincidentally, the same law prevented the head of Tatarstan to be named "President"), which lifted term limits for Russian governors. Tatarstan followed suit and lifted the restrictions, which allowed Minnikhanov to seek another term in 2025. As of 2025, Minnikhanov is the second-longest serving Russian governor only behind Ramzan Kadyrov, who has served as Head of the Chechen Republic since 2007.

In April 2025 A Just Russia – For Truth leader Sergey Mironov announced that the party would not field its candidate, supporting Rustam Minnikhanov in the upcoming head election, despite Minnikhanov not stating his intentions yet. In June 2025 Deputy Chairman of the State Duma Vladislav Davankov also said that New People would not compete in the election.

== Candidates ==
In Tatarstan candidates for head of the Republic of Tatarstan can be nominated only by registered political parties. Candidate for Head of Tatarstan should be a Russian citizen and at least 30 years old. Candidates for head of the Republic of Tatarstan should not have a foreign citizenship or residence permit. Each candidate in order to be registered is required to collect at least 5% of signatures of members and heads of municipalities. Also head candidates present 3 candidacies to the Federation Council and election winner later appoints one of the presented candidates.

Candidate name, political party	Occupation	Status	Ref.
Rustam Minnikhanov; United Russia	Incumbent Head of Tatarstan (2010–present)	Registered	
Khafiz Mirgalimov; Communist Party	Member of State Council of the Republic of Tatarstan (2004–present); 2015 presidential candidate	Registered	
Vitaly Smirnov; Party of Pensioners	Member of Bolshiye Yaki Council (2020–present); Retired businessman	Registered	
Ruslan Yusupov; Liberal Democratic Party	Member of State Council of the Republic of Tatarstan (2014–2019, 2024–present); Businessman; 2015 presidential candidate	Registered	

=== Eliminated at the convention ===
- Aleksandr Terentyev (United Russia), Senator from Tatarstan (2022–2025)

=== Candidates for Federation Council ===
Head candidate, political party	Candidates for Federation Council	Status
Rustam Minnikhanov; United Russia	* Nail Magdeyev, Mayor of Naberezhnye Chelny (2015–present) * Timur Nagumanov, former Mayor of Almetyevsk and Almetyevsky District (2019–2024) * Aleksandr Terentyev, incumbent Senator (2022–present)	Registered
Khafiz Mirgalimov; Communist Party	* Ramil Gaifullov, party official * Fadbir Safin, Member of State Council of the Republic of Tatarstan (2019–present) * Aleksey Semenikhin, water utilities executive	Registered
Vitaly Smirnov; Party of Pensioners	* Renat Galimzyanov, unemployed * Aleksandr Mikhaylov, pensioner * Ilya Zverev, individual entrepreneur	Registered
Ruslan Yusupov; Liberal Democratic Party	* Marat Bukharayev, Member of State Council of the Republic of Tatarstan (2004–2009, 2024–present) * Albina Myzryyeva, individual entrepreneur * Marat Valiyev, individual entrepreneur	Registered

== Polls ==
Fieldwork date	Polling firm	Minnikhanov	Mirgalimov	Yusupov	Smirnov	Lead
14 September 2025	2025 election	88.1	5.0	4.2	1.9	83.1
March – August 2025	CSRI	84	6	4	4	78

== Results ==
Summary of the 14 September 2025 Tatar head election results
Candidate	Party	Votes	%
Rustam Minnikhanov (incumbent)	United Russia	1,963,583	88.09
Khafiz Mirgalimov	Communist Party	110,734	4.97
Ruslan Yusupov	Liberal Democratic Party	93,536	4.20
Vitaly Smirnov	Party of Pensioners	42,292	1.90
Valid votes		2,210,145	99.15
Blank ballots		18,944	0.85
Total		2,229,089	100.00
Turnout		2,229,089	75.81
Registered voters		2,940,212	100.00

Head Minnikhanov appointed former Almetyevsk mayor Timur Nagumanov (United Russia) to the Federation Council, replacing incumbent Senator Aleksandr Terentyev (United Russia).

== See also ==
- 2025 Russian regional elections
