= List of chairmen of the State Council of the Republic of Tatarstan =

List of chairmen of the State Council of the Republic of Tatarstan.

This is a list of chairmen (speakers) of the Supreme Council of Tatarstan (from 1992: the State Council of the Republic of Tatarstan):

Name	Entered office	Left office
Mintimer Shaimiyev	April 11, 1990	June 1991
Farid Mukhametshin	July 1991	January 1995
Vasily Likhachyov	March 1, 1995	May 27, 1998
Farid Mukhametshin	May 27, 1998	Present
