= Malaya Tsilna =

Malaya Tsilna (Russian: Малая Цильна) is the name of several rural localities in Russia:

- Malaya Tsilna, Republic of Tatarstan, a selo in Drozhzhanovsky District of the Republic of Tatarstan
- Malaya Tsilna, Ulyanovsk Oblast, a village in Tsilninsky District of Ulyanovsk Oblast
