= Likhachyov =

Likмиhachyov (Russian: Лихачёв, masculine) or Likhachyova (Лихачёва, feminine), alternatively spelled Likhachev/Likhacheva or Likhachov/Likhachova, is a Russian surname shared by:

- Dmitry Likhachov (1906–1999), Russian language and literature scholar
- Galina Likhachova (born 1977), Russian speed skater
- Nikolay Likhachyov (1862–1936), Russian sigillographer
- Valery Likhachov (born 1947), Russian cyclist
- Vasily Likhachyov (1952–2019), Russian politician
