= 2024 Tatarstan State Council election =

2024 Tatarstan regional elections

- 8 September 2024

All 100 seats in the State Council 51 seats needed for a majority
- Turnout: 71.58% ▲1.50 pp
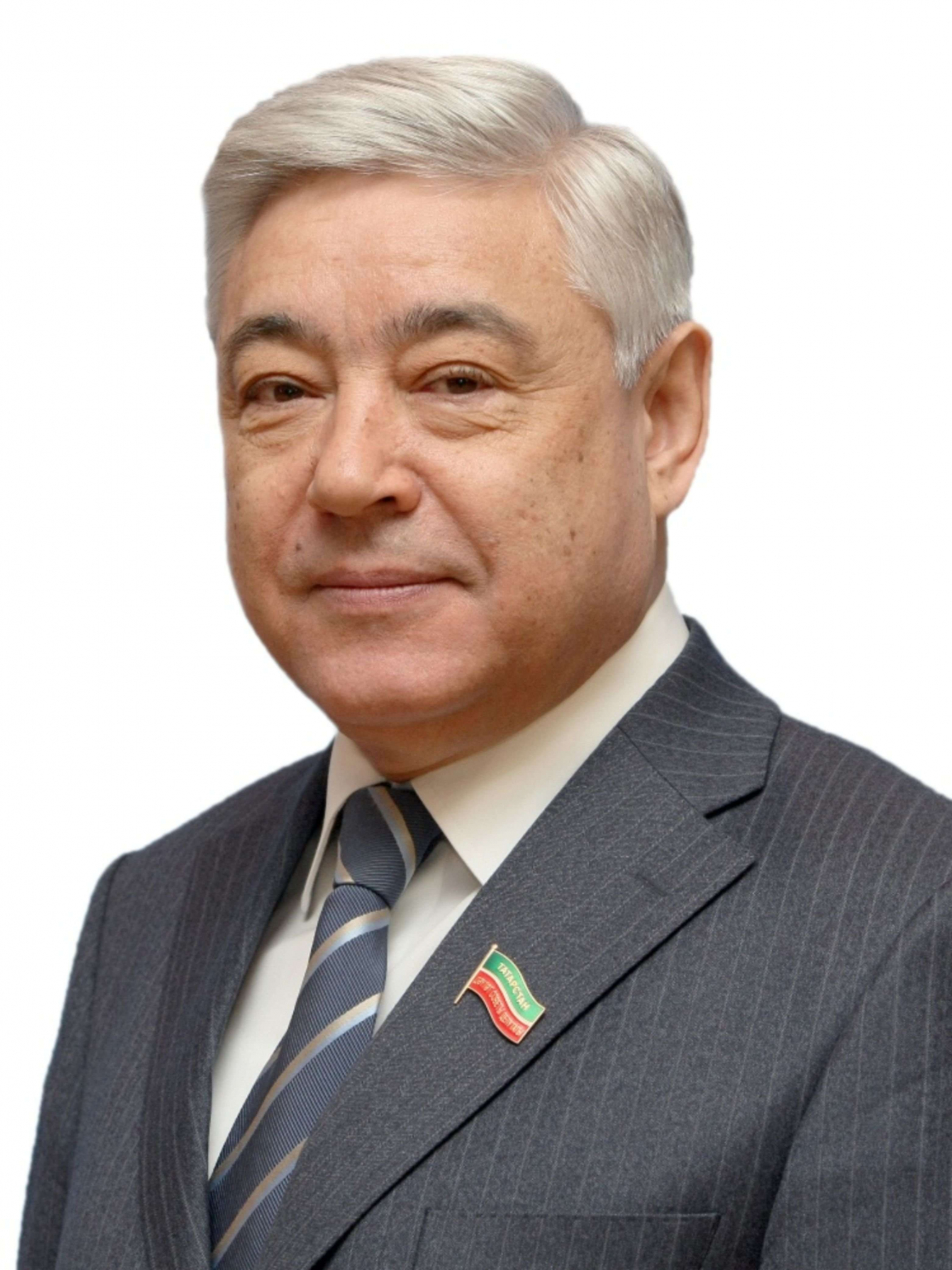

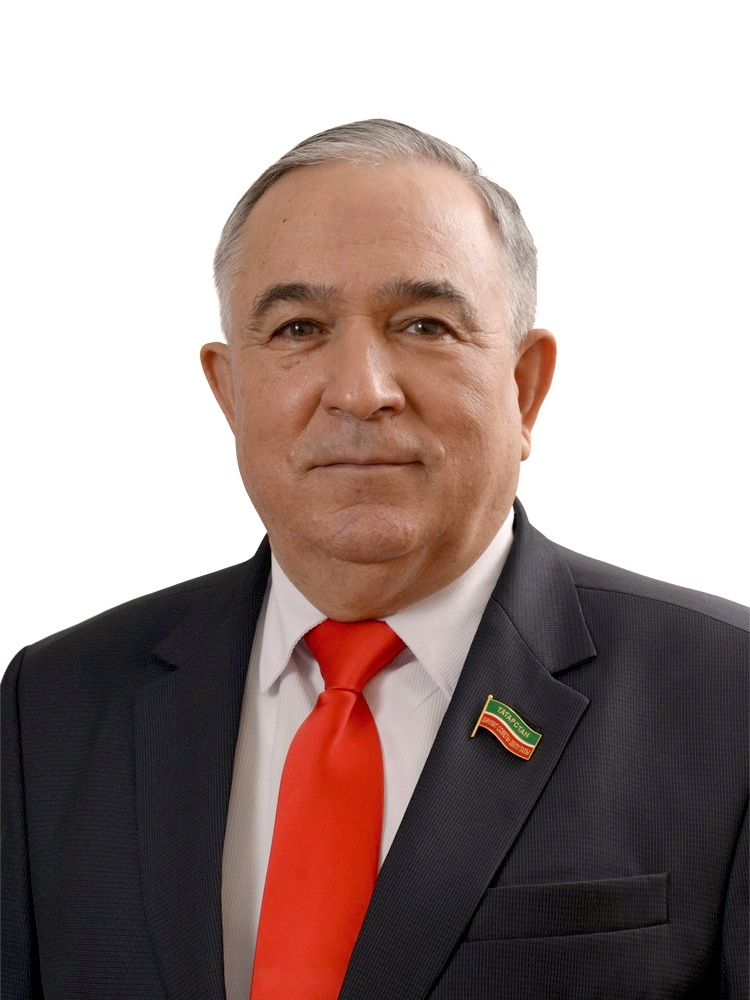

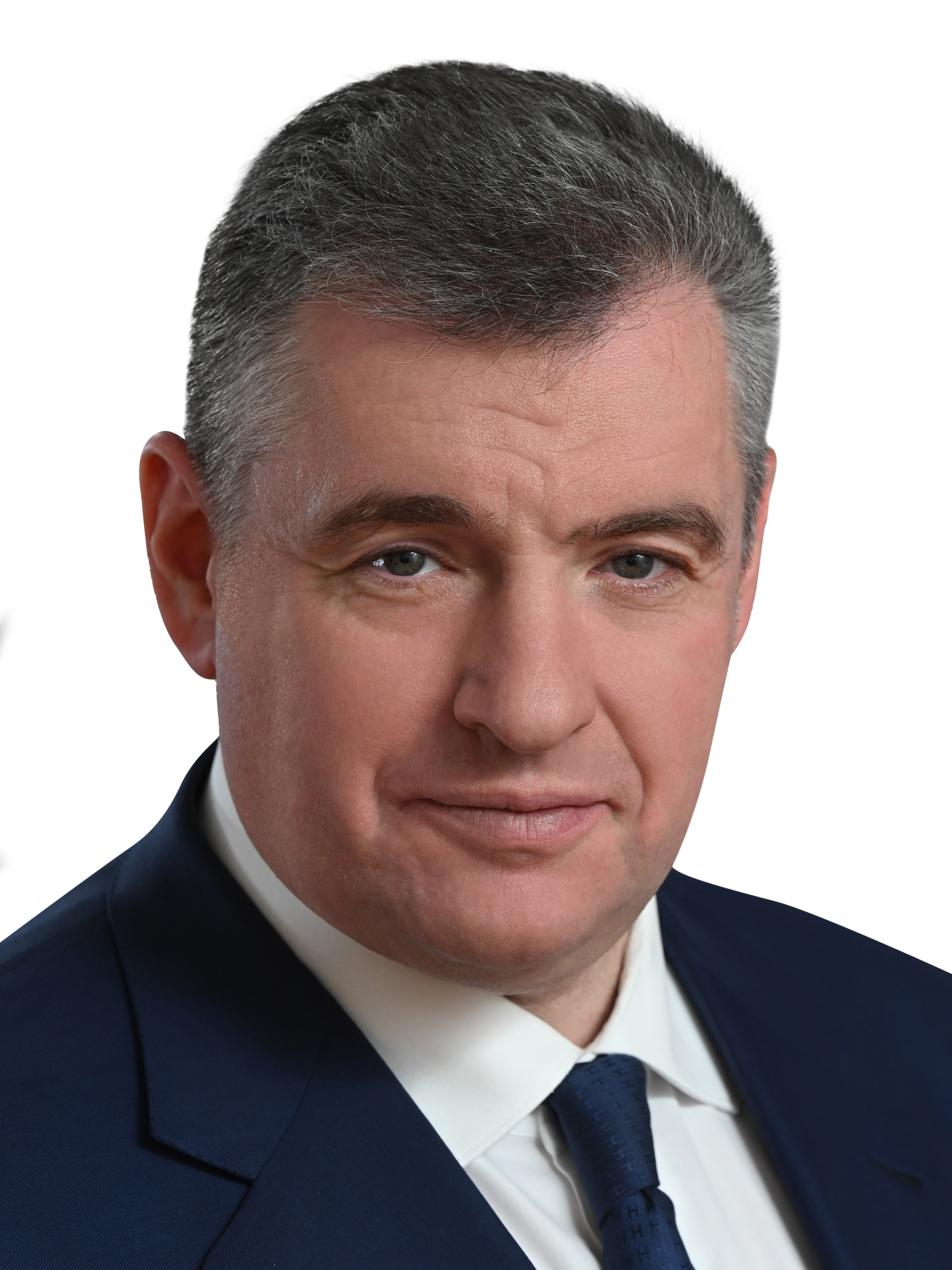
	Majority party	Minority party	Third party
Candidate	Farid Mukhametshin	Khafiz Mirgalimov	Leonid Slutsky
Party	United Russia	CPRF	LDPR
Last election	72.43%, 85 seats	10.74%, 6 seats	3.79%, 1 seat
Seats won	86	6	2
Seat change	▲1	Steady	▲1
Popular vote	1,608,194	220,914	92,493
Percentage	76.75%	10.54%	4.41%
Swing	▲4.32 pp	▲0.20 pp	▲0.62 pp
	Fourth party	Fifth party
	NL	SR-ZP
Candidate	Ruslan Nigmatulin	Rushan Mingazov
Party	New People	SR-ZP
Last election	Did not exist	3.96%, 1 seat
Seats won	2	1
Seat change	Did not exist	Steady
Popular vote	124,378	124,378
Percentage	4.21%	3.27%
Swing	Did not exist	▼0.69 pp
Chairman before election
Farid Mukhametshin
United Russia
Elected Chairman
Farid Mukhametshin
United Russia

The 2024 State Council of the Republic of Tatarstan election took place on 8 September 2024, on common election day. All 100 seats in the State Council were up for reelection.

United Russia retained its overwhelming majority in the State Council, winning 77% of the vote, while Communist Party of the Russian Federation remained the only other party to cross the threshold.

== Electoral system ==
Under current election laws, the State Council is elected for a term of five years, with parallel voting. 50 seats are elected by party-list proportional representation with a 5% electoral threshold, with the other half elected in 50 single-member constituencies by first-past-the-post voting. Seats in the proportional part are allocated using the Hare quota, modified to ensure that every party list, which passes the threshold, receives at least one mandate.

== Candidates ==
=== Party lists ===
To register regional lists of candidates, parties need to collect 0.5% of signatures of all registered voters in Tatarstan.

The following parties were relieved from the necessity to collect signatures:

- United Russia
- Communist Party of the Russian Federation
- A Just Russia — Patriots — For Truth
- Liberal Democratic Party of Russia
- New People
- Communists of Russia

№	Party	Party-list leaders	Candidates	Status
1	New People	Ruslan Nigmatulin • Roza Gaynutdinova • Mikhail Kuznetsov • Anton Klochkov • Natalya Mayorova	44	Registered
2	Liberal Democratic Party	Leonid Slutsky • Ruslan Yusupov • Ilyas Valiyev • Adel Vakhitov • Ilnur Samigullin	6	Registered
3	A Just Russia – For Truth	Rushan Mingazov • ~~Vadim Golyashev~~ • Sergey Sudykin • Dmitry Chirkov • Artur Kravchenko	44	Registered
4	United Russia	Farid Mukhametshin • Rasim Baksikov • Saria Saburskaya • Marat Akhmetov • Ilshat Aminov	57	Registered
5	Communist Party	Khafiz Mirgalimov • Nikolay Atlasov • Aleksandr Komisarov • ~~Sergey Tolstykh~~ • Fadbir Safin	23	Registered

New People took part in Tatar legislative election for the first time, while Russian Party of Pensioners for Social Justice and Communists of Russia, who participated in the last election, did not file.

=== Single-mandate constituencies ===
50 single-mandate constituencies were formed in Tatarstan. To register candidates in single-mandate constituencies need to collect 3% of signatures of registered voters in the constituency.

Number of candidates in single-mandate constituencies
Party	Candidates	
Party	Nominated	Registered
United Russia	43	42
Communist Party	49	44
A Just Russia – For Truth	49	44
Liberal Democratic Party	48	46
New People	44	36
Civic Initiative	3	0
Independent	12	4
Total	248	216

== Results ==
=== Results by party lists ===
Summary of the 8 September 2024 State Council of the Republic of Tatarstan election results
Party	Party list					Constituency		Total	
Party	Votes	%	±pp	Seats	+/–	Seats	+/–	Seats	+/–
United Russia	1,608,194	76.75	▲4.32	44	Steady	42	▲1	86	▲1
Communist Party	220,914	10.54	▲0.20	6	Steady	0	Steady	6	Steady
Liberal Democratic Party	92,493	4.41	▲0.62	0	Steady	2	▲1	2	▲1
New People	124,378	4.21	New	0	New	2	New	2	New
A Just Russia — For Truth	124,378	3.27	▼0.69	0	Steady	1	Steady	1	Steady
Independents	–	–	–	–	–	2	▼4	2	▼4
Invalid ballots	17,211	0.82	▼0.32	—	—	—	—	—	—
Total	2,095,445	100.00	—	50	Steady	50	Steady	100	Steady
Turnout	2,095,445	71.58	▲1.50	—	—	—	—	—	—
Registered voters	2,927,459	100.00	—	—	—	—	—	—	—

Farid Mukhametshin (United Russia) was re-elected as Chairman of the State Council, while incumbent Senator Gennady Emelyanov (United Russia) was re-appointed to the Federation Council.

=== Results in single-member constituencies ===
==== District 1 ====
Summary of the 8 September 2024 State Council of the Republic of Tatarstan election in Aydarovsky constituency No.1
Candidate	Party	Votes	%
Rushan Mingazov	A Just Russia – For Truth	17,085	58.97%
Khasan Mustafin	Communist Party	4,185	14.45%
Renat Khodzhayev	New People	3,694	12.75%
Almaz Sabirov	Liberal Democratic Party	3,589	12.39%
Total		28,971	100%

==== District 2 ====
Summary of the 8 September 2024 State Council of the Republic of Tatarstan election in Kopylovsky constituency No.2
Candidate	Party	Votes	%
Ramil Akhmetov (incumbent)	United Russia	17,033	60.04%
Mark Komarov	Communist Party	5,844	20.60%
Marat Kasimov	Liberal Democratic Party	5,200	18.33%
Total		28,370	100%

==== District 3 ====
Summary of the 8 September 2024 State Council of the Republic of Tatarstan election in Kremlyovsky constituency No.3
Candidate	Party	Votes	%
Aleksey Sozinov (incumbent)	United Russia	21,909	69.25%
Shamil Zabirov	Communist Party	3,870	12.23%
Roman Obukhov	Liberal Democratic Party	2,339	7.39%
Anton Klochkov	New People	1,884	5.96%
Anton Sergeyev	A Just Russia – For Truth	1,247	3.94%
Total		31,636	100%

==== District 4 ====
Summary of the 8 September 2024 State Council of the Republic of Tatarstan election in Pribrezhny constituency No.4
Candidate	Party	Votes	%
Aleksandr Livshits	United Russia	17,494	59.92%
Albert Monasypov	A Just Russia – For Truth	4,366	14.96%
Anton Kulakov	New People	2,624	8.99%
Timur Spiridonov	Liberal Democratic Party	2,344	8.03%
Ilya Togulev	Communist Party	2,047	7.01%
Total		29,194	100%

==== District 5 ====
Summary of the 8 September 2024 State Council of the Republic of Tatarstan election in Zarechensky constituency No.5
Candidate	Party	Votes	%
Ayrat Safin	United Russia	17,817	63.12%
Mikhail Kuznetsov	New People	3,799	13.46%
Vitaly Talov	A Just Russia – For Truth	2,474	8.76%
Yevgeny Potapov	Communist Party	2,253	7.98%
Ayrat Sabirov	Liberal Democratic Party	1,540	5.46%
Total		28,226	100%

==== District 6 ====
Summary of the 8 September 2024 State Council of the Republic of Tatarstan election in Dekabristsky constituency No.6
Candidate	Party	Votes	%
Artur Abdulzyanov (incumbent)	United Russia	17,705	62.31%
Mansur Samigullin	Communist Party	4,884	17.19%
Igor Kulmyayev	New People	2,865	10.08%
Marat Gimadeyev	Liberal Democratic Party	2,586	9.10%
Total		28,413	100%

==== District 7 ====
Summary of the 8 September 2024 State Council of the Republic of Tatarstan election in Ibragimovsky constituency No.7
Candidate	Party	Votes	%
Rima Mukhamedshina (incumbent)	United Russia	17,399	60.84%
Adel Islamov	Communist Party	3,601	12.59%
Dmitry Mulkov	New People	2,813	9.84%
Flarit Insapov	Liberal Democratic Party	2,532	8.85%
Aynur Avkhadyshin	A Just Russia – For Truth	1,972	6.90%
Total		28,597	100%

==== District 8 ====
Summary of the 8 September 2024 State Council of the Republic of Tatarstan election in Chuykovsky constituency No.8
Candidate	Party	Votes	%
Fanis Nurmukhametov	United Russia	16,808	60.05%
Artur Nizamov	Communist Party	3,575	12.77%
Daniil Sergeyev	New People	2,778	9.92%
Bulat Yagudin	Liberal Democratic Party	2,515	8.98%
Vitaly Belousov	A Just Russia – For Truth	1,980	7.07%
Total		27,992	100%

==== District 9 ====
Summary of the 8 September 2024 State Council of the Republic of Tatarstan election in Yamashevsky constituency No.9
Candidate	Party	Votes	%
Dmitry Soluyanov (incumbent)	United Russia	17,608	60.49%
Aleksandr Komisarov	Communist Party	3,610	12.40%
Ayaz Safin	New People	2,980	10.24%
Igor Nikiforov	Liberal Democratic Party	2,594	8.91%
Kirill Kezhin	A Just Russia – For Truth	2,006	6.89%
Total		29,107	100%

==== District 10 ====
Summary of the 8 September 2024 State Council of the Republic of Tatarstan election in Shapalyapinsky constituency No.10
Candidate	Party	Votes	%
Rustam Abdulkhakov (incumbent)	United Russia	22,531	69.38%
Ramil Akhmetvaliyev	Communist Party	5,283	16.27%
Leysan Khaziyeva	A Just Russia – For Truth	2,610	8.04%
Timur Sabirzyanov	New People	1,762	5.43%
Total		32,476	100%

==== District 11 ====
Summary of the 8 September 2024 State Council of the Republic of Tatarstan election in Gorkinsky constituency No.11
Candidate	Party	Votes	%
Niyaz Gafiyatullin (incumbent)	United Russia	23,673	69.13%
Fadbir Safin	Communist Party	5,684	16.60%
Aleksey Anisimov	Liberal Democratic Party	2,435	7.11%
Rustam Sergiyenko	A Just Russia – For Truth	2,090	6.10%
Total		34,244	100%

==== District 12 ====
Summary of the 8 September 2024 State Council of the Republic of Tatarstan election in Gabishevsky constituency No.12
Candidate	Party	Votes	%
Andrey Yegorov (incumbent)	United Russia	21,724	69.01%
Sergey Vinogradov	Communist Party	4,748	15.08%
Dmitry Chirkov	A Just Russia – For Truth	2,633	8.36%
Zinnur Sharipov	New People	1,129	3.59%
Nika Shtolts	Liberal Democratic Party	1,027	3.26%
Total		31,481	100%

==== District 13 ====
Summary of the 8 September 2024 State Council of the Republic of Tatarstan election in Derbyshkinsky constituency No.13
Candidate	Party	Votes	%
Emil Khusnutdinov (incumbent)	United Russia	19,707	58.35%
Almaz Valiyev	Communist Party	5,950	17.62%
Irek Nuriyakhmetov	Liberal Democratic Party	4,144	12.27%
Lenar Sagdiyev	New People	3,698	10.95%
Total		33,771	100%

==== District 14 ====
Summary of the 8 September 2024 State Council of the Republic of Tatarstan election in Pionersky constituency No.14
Candidate	Party	Votes	%
Dmitry Anisimov (incumbent)	United Russia	20,172	59.34%
Vitaly Ilyin	Communist Party	5,245	15.43%
Marat Agishev	Liberal Democratic Party	4,825	14.19%
Artur Kravchenko	A Just Russia – For Truth	3,501	10.30%
Total		33,992	100%

==== District 15 ====
Summary of the 8 September 2024 State Council of the Republic of Tatarstan election in Azinsky constituency No.15
Candidate	Party	Votes	%
Ruslan Yusupov	Liberal Democratic Party	18,721	56.56%
Almir Aleyev	Communist Party	6,560	19.82%
Aleksandr Venediktov	New People	4,036	12.19%
Radik Masnaveyev	A Just Russia – For Truth	3,484	10.53%
Total		33,098	100%

==== District 16 ====
Summary of the 8 September 2024 State Council of the Republic of Tatarstan election in Gvardeysky constituency No.16
Candidate	Party	Votes	%
Yevgeny Chekashov	United Russia	17,970	53.17%
Bulat Akhmetgarayev	Independent	4,508	13.34%
Albert Shakirov	Communist Party	4,461	13.20%
Ramilya Izmagilova	Liberal Democratic Party	2,334	6.91%
Artur Lotfullin	New People	2,273	6.73%
Damir Khusnutdinov	A Just Russia – For Truth	1,896	5.61%
Total		33,799	100%

==== District 17 ====
Summary of the 8 September 2024 State Council of the Republic of Tatarstan election in Komsomolsky constituency No.17
Candidate	Party	Votes	%
Marsel Mingalimov (incumbent)	United Russia	33,564	81.20%
Ilnur Magalimov	New People	4,400	10.64%
Aleksandr Gorin	Liberal Democratic Party	3,148	7.62%
Total		41,334	100%

==== District 18 ====
Summary of the 8 September 2024 State Council of the Republic of Tatarstan election in Melekessky constituency No.18
Candidate	Party	Votes	%
Gennady Yemelyanov	United Russia	27,556	74.34%
Dinar Ayupov	Communist Party	4,693	12.66%
Yevgeny Abramov	New People	2,496	6.73%
Diana Poleva	Liberal Democratic Party	2,098	5.66%
Total		37,066	100%

==== District 19 ====
Summary of the 8 September 2024 State Council of the Republic of Tatarstan election in Tsentralny constituency No.19
Candidate	Party	Votes	%
Oleg Nikolayev (incumbent)	United Russia	27,688	70.90%
Aleksandr Sokolov	New People	3,445	8.82%
Vladimir Tatarenko	Communist Party	3,147	8.06%
Vladimir Mikhelson	Liberal Democratic Party	2,751	7.04%
Yury Sayfetdinov	A Just Russia – For Truth	1,820	4.66%
Total		39,052	100%

==== District 20 ====
Summary of the 8 September 2024 State Council of the Republic of Tatarstan election in Elektrotekhnichesky constituency No.20
Candidate	Party	Votes	%
Ruslan Nigmatulin (incumbent)	New People	30,444	75.94%
Ilnur Samigullin	Liberal Democratic Party	6,111	15.24%
Zhanna Klimova	A Just Russia – For Truth	3,187	7.95%
Total		40,087	100%

==== District 21 ====
Summary of the 8 September 2024 State Council of the Republic of Tatarstan election in Vakhitovsky constituency No.21
Candidate	Party	Votes	%
Ildar Shamilov (incumbent)	United Russia	28,077	71.11%
Viktor Ruotsi	Communist Party	3,237	8.20%
Ayrat Kharasov	Liberal Democratic Party	3,106	7.87%
Igor Sidorenko	New People	3,022	7.65%
Sergey Vakhrushev	A Just Russia – For Truth	1,809	4.58%
Total		39,484	100%

==== District 22 ====
Summary of the 8 September 2024 State Council of the Republic of Tatarstan election in Borovetsky constituency No.22
Candidate	Party	Votes	%
Andrey Lyapunov	United Russia	25,123	65.60%
Marat Munasipov	Communist Party	5,324	13.90%
Alsu Vasilyeva	A Just Russia – For Truth	4,136	10.80%
Dmitry Smorzhevsky	Liberal Democratic Party	3,523	9.20%
Total		38,297	100%

==== District 23 ====
Summary of the 8 September 2024 State Council of the Republic of Tatarstan election in Avtozavodsky constituency No.23
Candidate	Party	Votes	%
Vladimir Chagin	United Russia	30,579	71.70%
Tatyana Mukhina	Communist Party	6,866	16.10%
Aydar Sharafullin	A Just Russia – For Truth	2,431	5.70%
Lilia Vasilyeva	New People	1,365	3.20%
Rushad Gusmanov	Liberal Democratic Party	1,279	3.00%
Total		42,648	100%

==== District 24 ====
Summary of the 8 September 2024 State Council of the Republic of Tatarstan election in Studenchesky constituency No.24
Candidate	Party	Votes	%
Ilshat Salakhov	United Russia	26,734	71.18%
Bulat Khuziyev	Communist Party	3,906	10.40%
Ildus Fazleyev	A Just Russia – For Truth	2,367	6.30%
Andrey Belousov	New People	2,072	5.52%
Vyacheslav Yudintsev	Liberal Democratic Party	1,881	5.01%
Total		37,556	100%

==== District 25 ====
Summary of the 8 September 2024 State Council of the Republic of Tatarstan election in Byzovsky constituency No.25
Candidate	Party	Votes	%
Marat Falyakhov	United Russia	29,578	68.36%
Svyatoslav Tarotin	Communist Party	5,067	11.71%
Fargat Fatkhutdinov	A Just Russia – For Truth	3,323	7.68%
Ayrat Akhmetgaliyev	New People	2,513	5.81%
Eduard Bondar	Liberal Democratic Party	2,449	5.66%
Total		43,271	100%

==== District 26 ====
Summary of the 8 September 2024 State Council of the Republic of Tatarstan election in Akhtubinsky constituency No.26
Candidate	Party	Votes	%
Eduard Galeyev	United Russia	28,951	72.65%
Albert Yagudin	Communist Party	4,927	12.36%
Linar Israfilov	A Just Russia – For Truth	2,860	7.18%
Ayvar Makhyanov	Liberal Democratic Party	2,800	7.03%
Total		39,848	100%

==== District 27 ====
Summary of the 8 September 2024 State Council of the Republic of Tatarstan election in Devonsky constituency No.27
Candidate	Party	Votes	%
Vadim Gilyazov	United Russia	26,628	71.80%
Oleg Matskel	A Just Russia – For Truth	2,858	7.71%
Damir Vafin	Communist Party	2,524	6.81%
Oleg Buyantsev	New People	2,420	6.53%
Khalil Galimov	Liberal Democratic Party	2,389	6.44%
Total		37,088	100%

==== District 28 ====
Summary of the 8 September 2024 State Council of the Republic of Tatarstan election in Bigashevsky constituency No.28
Candidate	Party	Votes	%
Ilfat Nursayetov	United Russia	27,882	72.84%
Vyacheslav Miller	New People	2,668	6.97%
Bogdan Baglay	Liberal Democratic Party	2,537	6.63%
Vyacheslav Leontyev	A Just Russia – For Truth	2,525	6.60%
Valentin Ivanov	Communist Party	2,478	6.47%
Total		38,280	100%

==== District 29 ====
Summary of the 8 September 2024 State Council of the Republic of Tatarstan election in Almetyevsky constituency No.29
Candidate	Party	Votes	%
Roza Gaynutdinova	New People	17,839	40.31%
Svetlana Bastyleva	Communist Party	12,511	28.27%
Adel Vakhitov	Liberal Democratic Party	10,382	23.46%
Igor Yevdokimov	A Just Russia – For Truth	3,019	6.82%
Total		44,260	100%

==== District 30 ====
Summary of the 8 September 2024 State Council of the Republic of Tatarstan election in Saydashevsky constituency No.30
Candidate	Party	Votes	%
Ruzilya Timergaleyeva (incumbent)	United Russia	27,337	66.58%
Zufar Khaliullin	Communist Party	7,231	17.61%
Roman Andreyev	Liberal Democratic Party	3,128	7.62%
Gaysa Malikov	New People	1,663	4.05%
Anatoly Tsyganov	A Just Russia – For Truth	1,315	3.20%
Total		41,056	100%

==== District 31 ====
Summary of the 8 September 2024 State Council of the Republic of Tatarstan election in Volzhsky constituency No.31
Candidate	Party	Votes	%
Renat Mistakhov (incumbent)	United Russia	35,747	73.00%
Marat Safiullin	Communist Party	4,102	8.38%
Asia Gubaydullina	A Just Russia – For Truth	3,410	6.96%
Marat Kadyrov	New People	2,749	5.61%
Kirill Yevseyev	Liberal Democratic Party	2,568	5.24%
Total		48,971	100%

==== District 32 ====
Summary of the 8 September 2024 State Council of the Republic of Tatarstan election in Bugulminsky constituency No.32
Candidate	Party	Votes	%
Rifnur Suleymanov (incumbent)	United Russia	26,726	64.14%
Oleg Yakhontov	Independent	5,206	12.49%
Eduard Mazakin	Communist Party	4,848	11.64%
Sergey Sudykin	A Just Russia – For Truth	1,968	4.72%
Sergey Khloptsev	Liberal Democratic Party	1,553	3.73%
Ivan Antonov	New People	924	2.22%
Total		41,666	100%

==== District 33 ====
Summary of the 8 September 2024 State Council of the Republic of Tatarstan election in Yugo-Vostochny constituency No.33
Candidate	Party	Votes	%
Irek Salikhov (incumbent)	Independent	45,811	91.85%
Ilya Ivanov	Communist Party	2,081	4.17%
Fanzat Yusupov	New People	694	1.39%
Yulia Stolyarova	A Just Russia – For Truth	549	1.10%
Olga Orlova	Liberal Democratic Party	527	1.06%
Total		49,875	100%

==== District 34 ====
The election in the district was cancelled and postponed to December 1, 2024, after nearly all candidates withdrew, leaving Albert Khusnillin (United Russia), son of Marat Khusnullin, the sole candidate left.

==== District 35 ====
Summary of the 8 September 2024 State Council of the Republic of Tatarstan election in Kamsko-Vyatsky constituency No.35
Candidate	Party	Votes	%
Rustem Usmanov	United Russia	42,020	82.55%
Andrey Valko	Communist Party	3,473	6.82%
Ruslan Valiullin	Liberal Democratic Party	2,823	5.55%
Aleksandr Baglay	A Just Russia – For Truth	2,277	4.47%
Total		50,901	100%

==== District 36 ====
Summary of the 8 September 2024 State Council of the Republic of Tatarstan election in Leninogorsky constituency No.36
Candidate	Party	Votes	%
Irek Khanipov	United Russia	33,632	71.74%
Ildus Shakirzyanov	Communist Party	8,625	18.40%
Ayrat Khayrullin	A Just Russia – For Truth	2,261	4.82%
Ruslan Khabibullin	Liberal Democratic Party	2,224	4.74%
Total		46,879	100%

==== District 37 ====
Summary of the 8 September 2024 State Council of the Republic of Tatarstan election in Yelabuzhsky constituency No.37
Candidate	Party	Votes	%
Timur Shagivaleyev (incumbent)	United Russia	29,888	73.12%
Mansur Garifullin	Communist Party	4,243	10.38%
Ilsur Islamov	Liberal Democratic Party	2,185	5.35%
Vladislav Pychenkov	New People	2,132	5.22%
Zakary Mingazov	A Just Russia – For Truth	1,916	4.69%
Total		40,878	100%

==== District 38 ====
Summary of the 8 September 2024 State Council of the Republic of Tatarstan election in Zainsky constituency No.38
Candidate	Party	Votes	%
Riyaz Komarov	United Russia	44,613	82.00%
Rustam Khalikov	New People	3,364	6.18%
Valery Aleynikov	Liberal Democratic Party	3,194	5.87%
Artur Gimatov	A Just Russia – For Truth	2,586	4.75%
Total		54,403	100%

==== District 39 ====
Summary of the 8 September 2024 State Council of the Republic of Tatarstan election in Aznakayevsky constituency No.39
Candidate	Party	Votes	%
Almaz Faritov	United Russia	38,412	77.17%
Ilnur Zaripov	Communist Party	5,102	10.25%
Islam Zaynullin	A Just Russia – For Truth	3,954	7.94%
Anton Panyushenkov	New People	2,066	4.15%
Total		49,774	100%

==== District 40 ====
Summary of the 8 September 2024 State Council of the Republic of Tatarstan election in Nurlatsky constituency No.40
Candidate	Party	Votes	%
Shamil Yagudin (incumbent)	United Russia	42,398	89.38%
Guzalia Burlakova	Communist Party	3,014	6.35%
Lyalya Abdullina	Liberal Democratic Party	998	2.10%
Ramil Sakhautdinov	A Just Russia – For Truth	744	1.57%
Total		47,437	100%

==== District 41 ====
Summary of the 8 September 2024 State Council of the Republic of Tatarstan election in Buinsky constituency No.41
Candidate	Party	Votes	%
Rinat Gayzatullin (incumbent)	United Russia	55,811	95.03%
Rustem Valeyev	A Just Russia – For Truth	1,292	2.20%
Artyom Khapayev	Liberal Democratic Party	1,290	2.20%
Total		58,729	100%

==== District 42 ====
Summary of the 8 September 2024 State Council of the Republic of Tatarstan election in Mendeleyevsky constituency No.42
Candidate	Party	Votes	%
Eduard Sharafiyev (incumbent)	Independent	46,834	86.57%
Gulnaz Novikova	Communist Party	4,749	8.78%
Flarid Safin	New People	1,554	2.87%
Shamil Idrisov	A Just Russia – For Truth	770	1.42%
Total		54,100	100%

==== District 43 ====
Summary of the 8 September 2024 State Council of the Republic of Tatarstan election in Priiksky constituency No.43
Candidate	Party	Votes	%
Albert Khabibullin (incumbent)	United Russia	45,642	78.37%
Andrey Bazhura	A Just Russia – For Truth	6,411	11.01%
Andrey Yesin	Liberal Democratic Party	5,783	9.93%
Total		58,242	100%

==== District 44 ====
Summary of the 8 September 2024 State Council of the Republic of Tatarstan election in Alekseyevsky constituency No.44
Candidate	Party	Votes	%
Foat Valiyev (incumbent)	United Russia	57,935	95.39%
Ilnaz Zaripov	Communist Party	981	1.62%
Lyubov Aleksandrova	Liberal Democratic Party	489	0.81%
Lilia Miftakhova	A Just Russia – For Truth	423	0.70%
Ilnur Khasanov	New People	418	0.69%
Total		60,733	100%

==== District 45 ====
Summary of the 8 September 2024 State Council of the Republic of Tatarstan election in Apastovsky constituency No.45
Candidate	Party	Votes	%
Aydar Tagirov	United Russia	40,820	88.27%
Danil Perov	Communist Party	2,046	4.42%
Razil Nabiullin	A Just Russia – For Truth	1,145	2.48%
Eduard Beus	Liberal Democratic Party	1,023	2.21%
Rafael Shermatov	New People	871	1.88%
Total		46,242	100%

==== District 46 ====
Summary of the 8 September 2024 State Council of the Republic of Tatarstan election in Arsky constituency No.46
Candidate	Party	Votes	%
Marat Bukharayev	Liberal Democratic Party	43,696	72.94%
Islam Valiullov	Communist Party	9,426	15.74%
Ramil Khismatullin	A Just Russia – For Truth	6,531	10.90%
Total		59,904	100%

==== District 47 ====
Summary of the 8 September 2024 State Council of the Republic of Tatarstan election in Kukmorsky constituency No.47
Candidate	Party	Votes	%
Niyaz Aitov	United Russia	47,716	84.12%
Anatoly Makarov	Communist Party	4,869	8.58%
Lenar Yunusov	Liberal Democratic Party	2,359	4.16%
Lilian Mingazov	A Just Russia – For Truth	738	1.30%
Maksim Shubin	New People	665	1.17%
Total		56,725	100%

==== District 48 ====
Summary of the 8 September 2024 State Council of the Republic of Tatarstan election in Laishevsky constituency No.48
Candidate	Party	Votes	%
Dmitry Samarenkin (incumbent)	United Russia	47,021	85.13%
Zufar Shaykhutdinov	Communist Party	4,041	7.32%
Linar Gilmutdinov	Liberal Democratic Party	1,406	2.55%
Albert Urmatov	New People	1,282	2.32%
Venera Nagimova	A Just Russia – For Truth	1,107	2.00%
Total		55,237	100%

==== District 49 ====
Summary of the 8 September 2024 State Council of the Republic of Tatarstan election in Pestrechinsky constituency No.49
Candidate	Party	Votes	%
Mikhail Syrovatsky	United Russia	34,155	73.46%
Azat Shaykhutdinov	Communist Party	5,178	11.14%
Yevgeny Molotnikov	A Just Russia – For Truth	3,988	8.58%
Andrey Smolentsev	Liberal Democratic Party	2,924	6.29%
Total		46,493	100%

==== District 50 ====
Summary of the 8 September 2024 State Council of the Republic of Tatarstan election in Vysokogorsky constituency No.50
Candidate	Party	Votes	%
Azat Ziganshin (incumbent)	United Russia	42,423	85.99%
Lyaylya Khanafina	Communist Party	3,392	6.88%
Rushan Khasanov	Liberal Democratic Party	2,124	4.31%
Tatyana Berbeka	A Just Russia – For Truth	986	2.00%
Total		49,337	100%

=== Members ===
Incumbent deputies are highlighted with bold, elected members who declined to take a seat are marked with ~~strikethrough~~.

Constituency
No.	Member	Party
1	Rushan Mingazov	A Just Russia – For Truth
2	Ramil Akhmetov	United Russia
3	Aleksey Sozinov	United Russia
4	Aleksandr Livshits	United Russia
5	Ayrat Safin	United Russia
6	Artur Abdulzyanov	United Russia
7	Rima Mukhamedshina	United Russia
8	Fanis Nurmukhametov	United Russia
9	Dmitry Soluyanov	United Russia
10	Rustam Abdulkhakov	United Russia
11	Niyaz Gafiyatullin	United Russia
12	Andrey Yegorov	United Russia
13	Emil Khusnutdinov	United Russia
14	Dmitry Anisimov	United Russia
15	Ruslan Yusupov	Liberal Democratic Party
16	Yevgeny Chekashov	United Russia
17	Marsel Mingalimov	United Russia
18	Gennady Emelyanov	United Russia
19	Oleg Nikolayev	United Russia
20	Ruslan Nigmatulin	New People
21	Ildar Shamilov	United Russia
22	Andrey Lyapunov	United Russia
23	Vladimir Chagin	United Russia
24	Ilshat Salakhov	United Russia
25	Marat Falyakhov	United Russia
26	Eduard Galeyev	United Russia
27	Vadim Gilyazov	United Russia
28	Ilfat Nursayetov	United Russia
29	Roza Gaynutdinova	New People
30	Ruzilya Timergaleyeva	United Russia
31	Renat Mistakhov	United Russia
32	Rifnur Suleymanov	United Russia
33	Irek Salikhov	Independent
34	vacant	
35	Rustem Usmanov	United Russia
36	Irek Khanipov	United Russia
37	Timur Shagivaleyev	United Russia
38	Riyaz Komarov	United Russia
39	Almaz Faritov	United Russia
40	Shamil Yagudin	United Russia
41	Rinat Gayzatullin	United Russia
42	Eduard Sharafiyev	Independent
43	Albert Khabibullin	United Russia
44	Foat Valiyev	United Russia
45	Aydar Tagirov	United Russia
46	Marat Bukharayev	Liberal Democratic Party
47	Niyaz Aitov	United Russia
48	Dmitry Samarenkin	United Russia
49	Mikhail Syrovatsky	United Russia
50	Azat Ziganshin	United Russia

Party lists
Member	Party
Farid Mukhametshin	United Russia
Rasim Baksikov	United Russia
~~Saria Saburskaya~~	United Russia
Marat Akhmetov	United Russia
Ilshat Aminov	United Russia
Yury Kamaltynov	United Russia
Lilia Mavrina	United Russia
Ryagat Khusainov	United Russia
Kamil Gilmanov	United Russia
Vladimir Vavilov	United Russia
Nazip Khazipov	United Russia
Ivan Yegorov	United Russia
Rkail Zaydullin	United Russia
Svetlana Vostrikova	United Russia
Kamil Nugayev	United Russia
Marat Galiyev	United Russia
Muslima Latypova	United Russia
Olga Voronova	United Russia
Fanil Bagautdinov	United Russia
Edvard Abdullazyanov	United Russia
Alsu Nabiyeva	United Russia
Leonid Yakunin	United Russia
Yelena Kuzmicheva	United Russia
Lyalya Kudermetova	United Russia
Ilgiz Zayniyev	United Russia
Ayrat Ziatdinov	United Russia
Svetlana Zakharova	United Russia
Gennady Glushkov	United Russia
Myakzyum Salakhov	United Russia
Ayrat Zaripov	United Russia
Rinat Fazylov	United Russia
Renat Valiullin	United Russia
Irina Terentyeva	United Russia
Valery Mironchenko	United Russia
Alsu Nadrshina	United Russia
Oleg Vlasov	United Russia
Yevgeny Sultanov	United Russia
Timur Kamaletdinov	United Russia
Marat Galeyev	United Russia
Azat Khamayev	United Russia
Aleksandr Chubarov	United Russia
Marat Bariyev	United Russia
Danis Zaripov	United Russia
Ruslan Shigabuddinov	United Russia
Danis Shakirov	United Russia
Khafiz Mirgalimov	Communist Party
Nikolay Atlasov	Communist Party
Aleksandr Komissarov	Communist Party
Fadbir Safin	Communist Party
Albert Yagudin	Communist Party
Mansur Garifullin	Communist Party

== See also ==
- 2024 Russian elections
