= Tatarstan — New Age =

Tatarstan — New Age Tatar: Татарстан — яңа гасыр Russian: Татарстан — новый век
- Leader: Rinat Zakirov
- Founder: Rinat Zakirov
- Split from: United Russia
- Ideology: Soft Tatar nationalism Environmentalism; Putinism
- Political position: Big tent
- Seats in the State Council: 0 / 100

Website
- tnvrod.ru

Tatarstan — New Age (Tatar: Татарстан — яңа гасыр, romanized: Tatarstan - yaña gasır, Russian: Татарстан — новый век, romanized: Tatarstan — novyj vek) was a political group in the State Council of Tatarstan. Formed by former United Russia members who broke away from the party, it was led by Rinat Zakirov while State Council Chairman Farid Mukhametshin was also affiliated with the group. Its policies included mild Tatar nationalism, the expansion of social welfare, and environmentalism. It held 8 seats in the State Council of Tatarstan until 2024.

It was generally supportive of Vladimir Putin and his policies.

It did not contest the 2024 election, in which most of its members rejoined United Russia.
