= Head of the Republic of Tatarstan =

Highest-ranking official in Tatarstan, Russia

- Татарстан Республикасы Рәисе (Tatar); Глава Республики Татарстан (Russian)
- Standard of the head of the republic

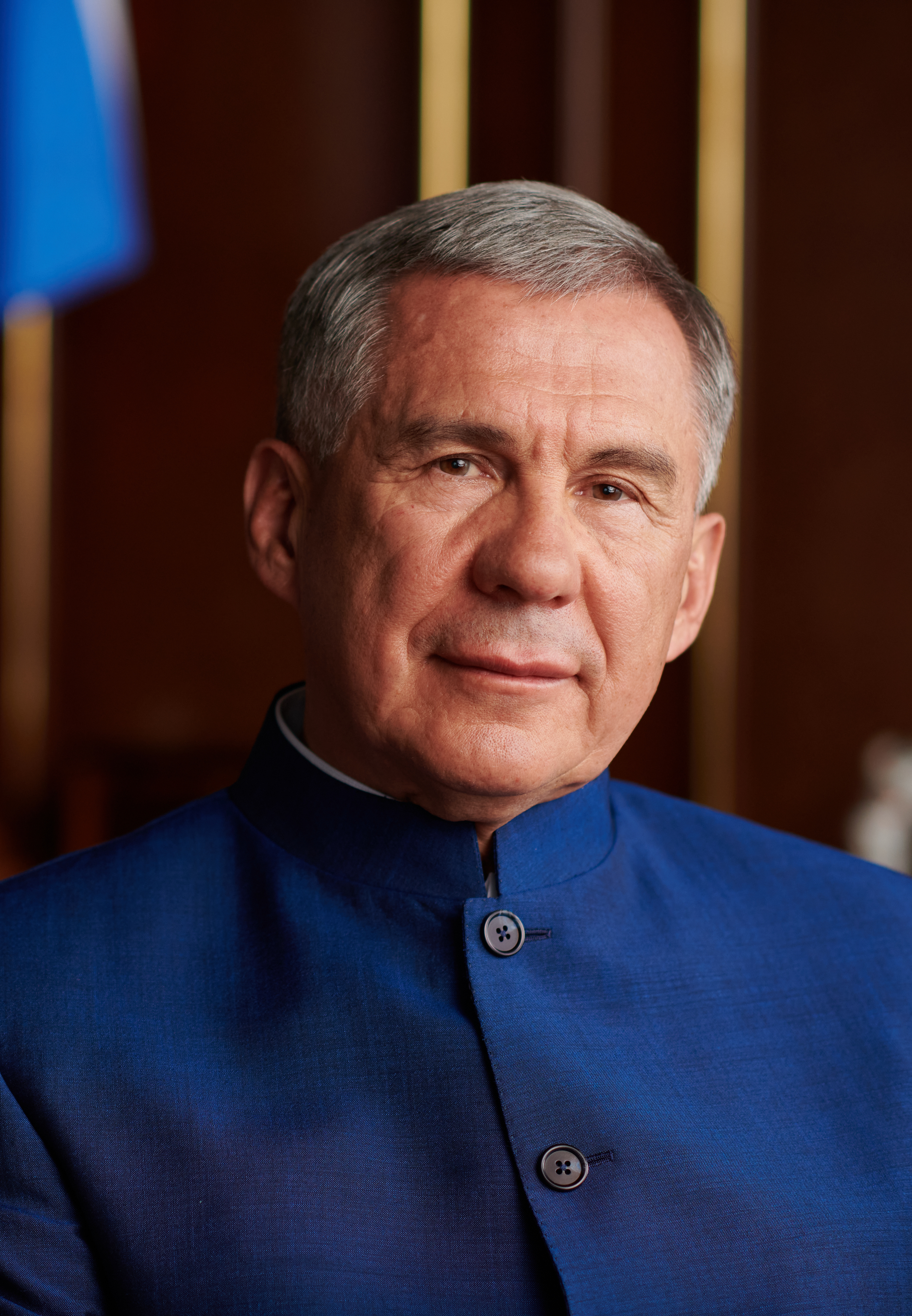
- Incumbent; Rustam Minnikhanov since 25 March 2010
- Executive branch of the Republic of Tatarstan
- Style: His Excellency; The Honorable
- Type: Governor; Head of state; Head of government
- Residence: Kazan Kremlin
- Nominator: Political parties
- Appointer: Direct elections
- Term length: 5 years
- Formation: 12 June 1991
- First holder: Mintimer Shaimiev
- Website: Official website

The head of the Republic of Tatarstan (Note: Russian: Глава Республики Татарстан, romanized: Glava Respubliki Tatarstan; Tatar: Татарстан Республикасы Рәисе, romanized: Tatarstan Respublikası Rəise) is the head and highest-ranking official of Tatarstan, a federal subject of Russia. The office was established in 1991 with the title of president of the Republic of Tatarstan. (Note: Russian: Президент Республики Татарстан, romanized: Prezident Respubliki Tatarstan; Tatar: Татарстан Республикасы Президенты, romanized: Tatarstan Respublıkası Prezidentı)

== Title ==
In 2017, following the expiration of the 1994 agreement between Moscow and Kazan which granted Tatarstan substantial autonomy, the title of president (президент) was expected to be replaced with head (глава), as it was done with other republics in Russia. The government of Tatarstan however resisted attempts to have the title abolished and the federal government declined to press the issue.

However, shortly after legislative elections in September 2021, deputies in the State Duma prepared a bill to unify the titles of the leaders of all of Russia's regions to head. The bill, seen as directly aimed at Tatarstan, would reserve the title of president exclusively for the president of Russia. In response, lawmakers in Tatarstan's State Council voted against it. The bill was approved in its first reading in November. On 15 December, it was approved by the Federation Council and subsequently signed by president Vladimir Putin on 21 December.

The law went into effect on 1 June 2022. Tatarstan's presidential secretary said that the title would remain during a transitional period throughout 2022 where the constitution was to be amended. The renaming of the post was expected to be completed by 2023. The loss of the title was perceived by many in Tatarstan as a further erosion of their autonomy within Russia.

In December 2022, regional lawmakers voted in favor of the title change, adopting the Arabic title rais (meaning "leader") in Tatar for "head of the republic". The title of president was seen as the last remaining symbol of federalism following the centralization reforms under Vladimir Putin. Incumbent president Rustam Minnikhanov however would have retained the title of president until his term expired in 2025 under transitional agreements. On 26 January 2023 Minnikhanov signed the amendments into law; however, the proposed transitional period was abandoned, forcing the title change to occur by 6 February.

== List of presidents ==
No.	Portrait	Name (born–died)	Term of office			Political party	Elected	Ref.
No.	Portrait	Name (born–died)	Took office	Left office	Time in office	Political party	Elected	Ref.
1		Mintimer Shaimiev (born 1937)	4 July 1991	25 March 2010	18 years, 264 days	Communist Party of the Soviet Union	1991; 1996; 2001; 2005 (Note: Appointed by the President of Russia with the consent of the State Council.)	
1		Mintimer Shaimiev (born 1937)	4 July 1991	25 March 2010	18 years, 264 days	Independent	1991; 1996; 2001; 2005	
1		Mintimer Shaimiev (born 1937)	4 July 1991	25 March 2010	18 years, 264 days	Fatherland – All Russia	1991; 1996; 2001; 2005	
1		Mintimer Shaimiev (born 1937)	4 July 1991	25 March 2010	18 years, 264 days	United Russia	1991; 1996; 2001; 2005	
2		Rustam Minnikhanov (born 1957)	25 March 2010	Incumbent	16 years, 238 days	United Russia	2010; 2015; 2020; 2025	

== Latest election ==
The latest election for the office was held on 14 September 2025.

Summary of the 14 September 2025 Tatar head election results
Candidate	Party	Votes	%
Rustam Minnikhanov (incumbent)	United Russia	1,963,583	88.09
Khafiz Mirgalimov	Communist Party	110,734	4.97
Ruslan Yusupov	Liberal Democratic Party	93,536	4.20
Vitaly Smirnov	Party of Pensioners	42,292	1.90
Valid votes		2,210,145	99.15
Blank ballots		18,944	0.85
Total		2,229,089	100.00
Turnout		2,229,089	75.81
Registered voters		2,940,212	100.00

== See also ==
- Prime Minister of the Republic of Tatarstan
