= Staroye Drozhzhanoye =

Staroye Drozhzhanoye Старое Дрожжаное
- Selo
- Interactive map of Staroye Drozhzhanoye
- Location of Staroye Drozhzhanoye Staroye Drozhzhanoye (Tatarstan)
- Coordinates: 54°43′25″N 47°33′39″E
- Country: Russia
- Federal subject: Tatarstan

Population (2010 Census)
  - Total: 3,210
  - Estimate (2021): 3,113 (−3%)

Administrative status
  - Subordinated to: Drozhzhanovsky District
- Time zone: UTC+3 (MSK)
- Postal code: 422470
- OKTMO ID: 92624470101

Staroye Drozhzhanoye (Russian: Старое Дрожжаное; Tatar: Иске Чүпрәле; Chuvash: Аслă Çĕпрел, Aslă Śĕprel) is a rural locality (a selo) and the administrative center of Drozhzhanovsky District in Tatarstan, Russia. Population: 3,210 (2010 census);
