= Malaya Tsilna, Republic of Tatarstan =

Malaya Tsilna Малая Цильна
- Selo

Other transcription(s)
  - Tatar: Кече Чынлы
- Interactive map of Malaya Tsilna
- Location of Malaya Tsilna Malaya Tsilna (Tatarstan)
- Coordinates: 54°46′N 47°51′E
- Country: Russia
- Federal subject: Tatarstan
- Administrative district: Drozhzhanovsky District
- Founded: 16th-18th century
- Elevation: 107 m (351 ft)

Population
  - Estimate (2024): 1,407 )

Municipal status
  - Municipal district: Drozhzhanovsky Municipal District
  - Rural settlement: Malotsilninskoye Rural Settlement
  - Capital of: Malotsilninskoye Rural Settlement
- Time zone: UTC+3 (MSK)
- Postal code: 422463
- Dialing code: +7 84375
- OKTMO ID: 92624430101

Malaya Tsilna (Russian: Малая Цильна; Tatar: Кече Чынлы) is a rural locality (a selo) in Drozhzhanovsky District of the Republic of Tatarstan, Russia, located on the Malaya Tsilna River. Population: 1,407.

== Geography ==
The total farmland area is 6,405 hectares (15,830 acres), including 5,423 hectares (13,400 acres) of arable land.

== Education and culture ==
There is a secondary school in Malaya Tsilna. It was founded in 1925 as a four-year elementary school, became a junior high school in 1931, and a secondary school in 1972.

There is also a House of Culture which can seat 350.
