= Timur Nagumanov =

- Тимур Нагуманов
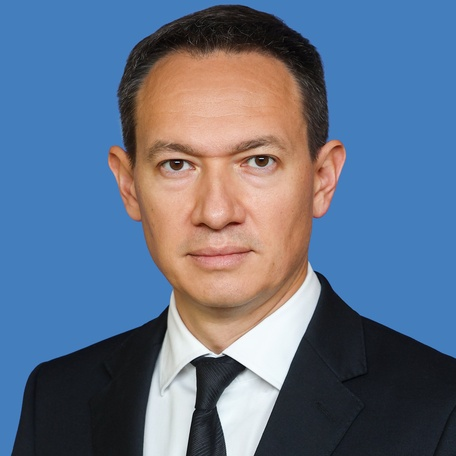

Senator from Khakassia
- In office 19 September 2025 – Incumbent
- Preceded by: Aleksandr Terentyev

Personal details
- Born: 23 February 1983 (age 43) Kazan, RSFSR, Soviet Union
- Party: United Russia
- Education: Kazan State Finance and Economics Institute

Timur Dmitrievich Nagumanov (born February 23, 1983, in Kazan, Tatar ASSR, RSFSR, USSR) is a Russian statesman. He has served as a Senator of the Federation Council representing the executive branch of the Republic of Tatarstan since September 19, 2025. He is a member of the Federation Council Committee on Budget and Financial Markets.

He was the Head of Almetyevsk and the Almetyevsky District (2019–2024), and an assistant to the Rais of the Republic of Tatarstan (2024–2025).

== Biography ==
He was born in Kazan on February 23, 1983. His father, Dmitry Nagumanov, served as the head of the Ministry of Finance of the Republic of Tatarstan from 1990 to 1997.

In 2002, he began his professional career as the Commercial Director of Austin LLC (Zelenodolsk). From 2004 to 2005, Nagumanov served as the Head of the Finance Department at Buinsky Sakharny Zavod and as the General Director of New Sakharnye Tekhnologii LLC in the Buinsky District.

From 2005 to 2006, he served as Deputy General Director for Economics and Finance at Zainsky Sakhar.

From 2006 to 2007, he was the director of Burundukovsky Elevator.

In 2006, he graduated from the Kazan State Institute of Finance and Economics with a Master of Arts in Economics. He also completed the Master of Business Administration professional retraining program at the Skolkovo School of Management.

Since the end of 2015, he has been included in the management talent pool under the patronage of Russian President Vladimir Putin.

=== Political Career ===
In 2007, Timur Dmitrievich was appointed head of the executive committee of the Drozhzhanovsky District.

On December 7, 2007, he was elected head of the Drozhzhanovsky Municipal District of Tatarstan.

In January 2013, he was appointed Commissioner for the Protection of Entrepreneurs' Rights under the President of the Republic of Tatarstan. On September 8, 2019, Timur Dmitrievich Nagumanov was elected as a deputy of the Almetyevsk City Council. He received 63.8% of the vote in Western Single-Mandate Constituency No. 15.

On September 16, 2019, following a secret ballot of the Almetyevsk City Council deputies, he was elected mayor and head of the Almetyevsk District. 25 council members voted in support of Nagumanov's candidacy. Nagumanov’s candidacy was supported by Rustam Minnikhanov, President of Tatarstan.

On November 15, 2024, he was appointed assistant to the head (rais) of the Republic of Tatarstan.

On September 19, 2025, by decree of the head of the Republic of Tatarstan, Rustam Minnikhanov, he was appointed a new senator from the executive branch of the Republic of Tatarstan, replacing Alexander Terentyev.
