= Gennady Yemelyanov =

Russian politician

- Геннадий Емельянов
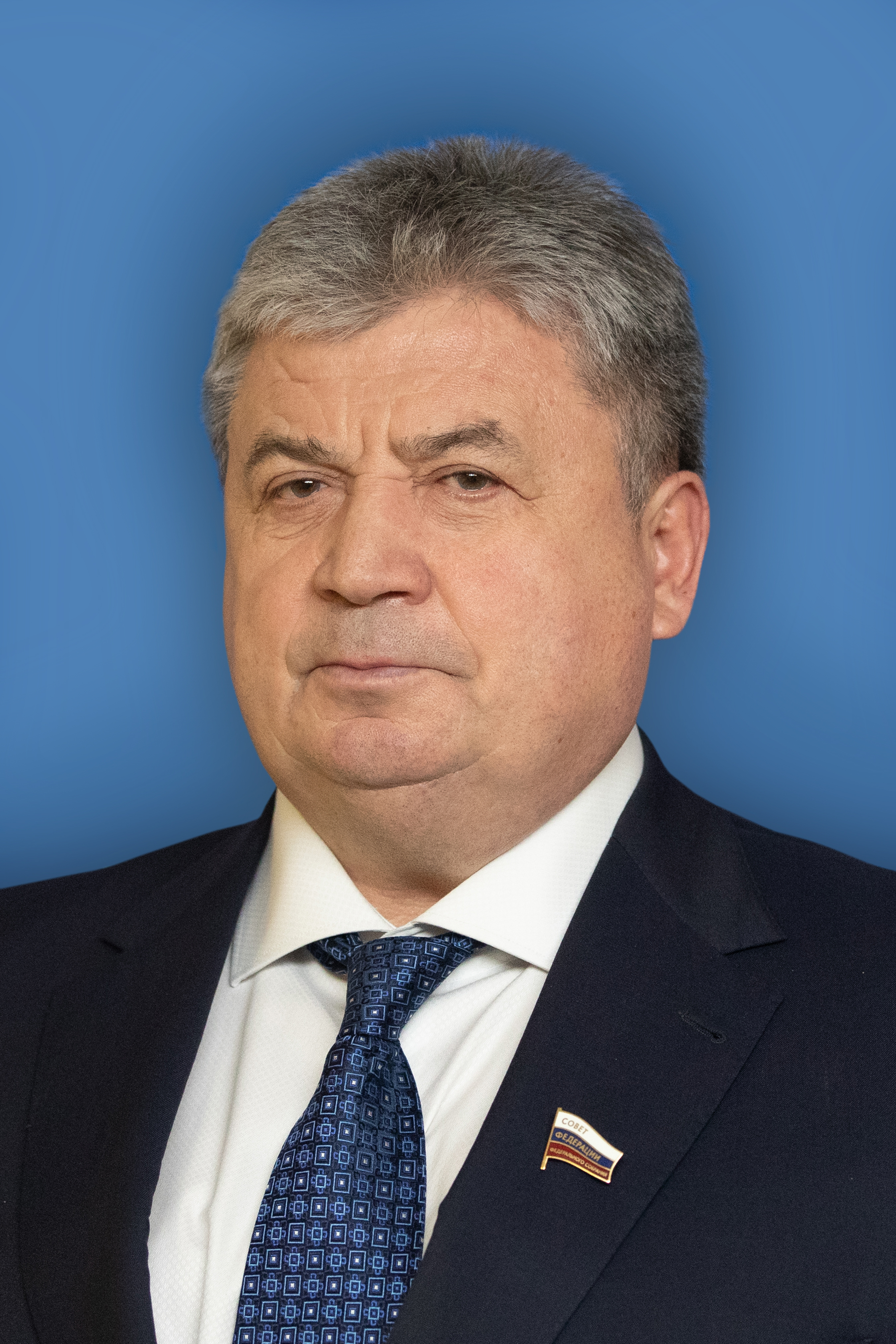

Senator from Tatarstan
- Incumbent
- Assumed office 2 October 2019
- Preceded by: Ildus Akhmetzyanov

Personal details
- Born: Gennady Yemelyanov; 1 January 1957 (age 68) Tatar Autonomous Soviet Socialist Republic, Russian Soviet Federative Socialist Republic, Soviet Union
- Political party: United Russia

Gennady Yegorovich Yemelyanov (Russian: Геннадий Егорович Емельянов; born 1 January 1957) is a Russian politician serving as a senator from Tatarstan since 2 October 2019.

== Biography ==
Gennady Yemelyanov was born on 1 January 1957 in Tatar Autonomous Soviet Socialist Republic. In 1987, he graduated from the Kazan National Research Technological University.

From 1974 to 1987, Yemelyanov worked at Nizhnekamsk motor transport enterprises. From 1999 to 2004, he was the First Deputy Head of Administration of Naberezhnye Chelny. The same year he was appointed as head of the Zelenodolsk administration. On 17 March 2009, he was appointed as Minister of Transport and Road Facilities of the Republic of Tatarstan. From 2010 to 2019, he was also the deputy of the Yelabuzhsk City Council of the 2nd and 3rd convocations and, simultaneously, the mayour of Yelabuzhsk. On 2 October 2019, he became the senator from the State Council of the Republic of Tatarstan.

Gennady Yemelyanov is under personal sanctions introduced by the European Union, the United Kingdom, the USA, Canada, Switzerland, Australia, Ukraine, New Zealand, for ratifying the decisions of the "Treaty of Friendship, Cooperation and Mutual Assistance between the Russian Federation and the Donetsk People's Republic and between the Russian Federation and the Luhansk People's Republic" and providing political and economic support for Russia's annexation of Ukrainian territories.
