= Vasily Likhachyov =

Russian politician and diplomat (1952–2019)

- Василий Лихачёв
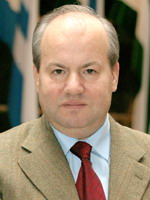
- Likhachyov in 2008

Russian Federation Senator from the Republic of Ingushetia
- In office 11 March 2004 – 3 March 2010
- Preceded by: Igor Kamenskoy
- Succeeded by: Musa Keligov

Permanent Representative from Russia to the European Union
- In office 5 May 1998 – 11 March 2003
- Preceded by: Ivan Silayev
- Succeeded by: Mikhail Fradkov

Chairman of the State Council of Tatarstan
- In office 1 March 1995 – 27 May 1998
- Preceded by: office established
- Succeeded by: Farid Mukhametshin

Vice President of Tatarstan
- In office 4 July 1991 – 30 March 1995
- President: Mintimer Shaimiev
- Preceded by: office established
- Succeeded by: office eliminated

Personal details
- Born: 5 January 1952 Gorky, Russian SFSR, Soviet Union
- Died: 8 April 2019 (aged 67)
- Spouse: Nina F. Likhachyova
- Education: Kazan State University (PhD)

Vasily Nikolayevich Likhachyov (Russian: Василий Николаевич Лихачёв; 5 January 1952 – 8 April 2019) was a Russian politician, the Permanent Representative for Russia to the European Council (1998), and Deputy Minister of Justice in Russia. Since 2011 until his death he was a Russian State Duma deputy from the Communist Party of the Russian Federation.

Likhachyov was the son of Nina F. Likhachyova and was married to Nailya Imatovna Taktasheva and had two daughters.

== Biography ==
In 1975 he graduated from Kazan State University and obtained a degree of PhD in Law. He was a Fellow of Russian Academy of Natural Sciences, an Associate Member of Tatarstan Republic Academy of Sciences.

In 1978–1988 he was an associate professor in Kazan University. During the period of 1982–1983 he was lecturing in National Law school of Guinea-Bissau Republic. In 1987–1988 he was a lecturer in the University of Madagascar Republic.

From 1991 to 1995 he was holding an office of Vice-president of Tatarstan Republic. In 1995–1998 he was a Chair of the National Council of Tatarstan Republic and a chairman assistant of the Federation Council of the Federal Assembly of the Russian Federation. From 1998 to 2003 he was a Permanent Representative from Russian Federation in European Communities, Brussel. In 2004 he was elected as a representative from the legislative body of Republic Ingushetia government to the Federation Council. In 2010 he was appointed a Deputy Minister of Justice of Russian Federation and stayed in this office till 2011. He was a member of Duma Committee on the Commonwealth of Independent States and Connections with Countrymen. He authored ten monographs and more than 500 scientific articles. He had a diplomatic rank of Ambassador Extraordinary and Plenipotentiary.

== Awards ==
- Order of Honour (1996)
- Order for Merit to the Fatherland Fourth Class (2007)
