= Mintimer Shaimiev =

President of Tatarstan from 1991 to 2010

- Минтимер Шаймиев; Минтимер Шәймиев
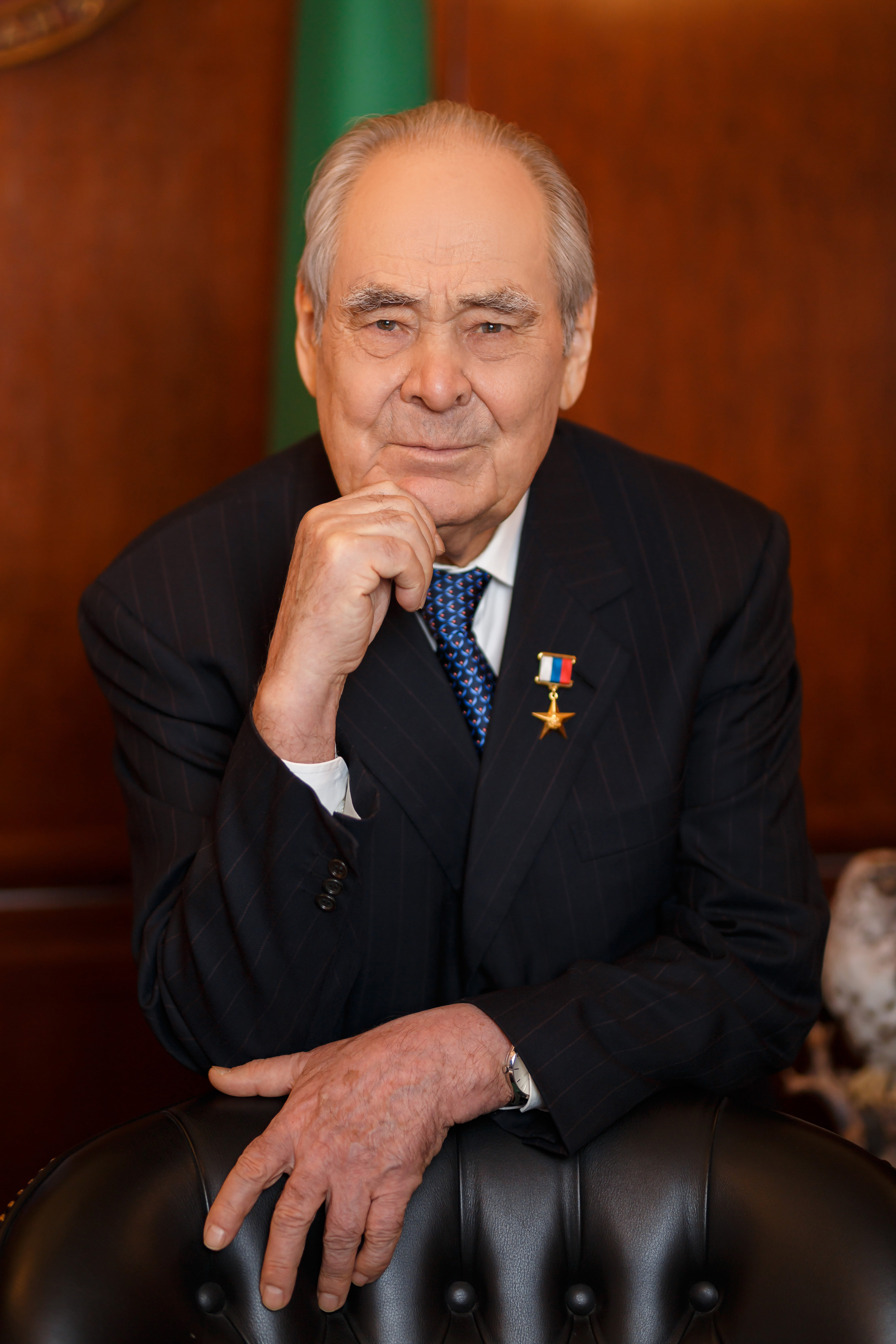
- Official portrait, 2019

1st President of Tatarstan
- In office 12 June 1991 – 25 March 2010
- Prime Minister: Mukhammat Sabirov; Farid Mukhametshin (himself); Rustam Minnikhanov
- Preceded by: Office created
- Succeeded by: Rustam Minnikhanov

Acting Prime Minister of Tatarstan
- In office 27 May 1998 – 10 July 1998
- Preceded by: Farid Mukhametshin
- Succeeded by: Rustam Minnikhanov

State Counselor of the Republic of Tatarstan
- Incumbent
- Assumed office 26 April 2010

Chairman of United Russia
- In office 1 December 2001 – 27 November 2004 Serving with Sergei Shoigu and Yury Luzhkov
- Preceded by: Party established
- Succeeded by: Boris Gryzlov

Personal details
- Born: 20 January 1937 (age 89) Änäk, Tatar ASSR, Russian SFSR, Soviet Union
- Party: United Russia (since 2001); Fatherland – All Russia (1999–2001); Independent (1991–1999); Communist Party of the Soviet Union (1963–1991)
- Spouse: Sakina Shakirovna Shaimieva
- Children: 2
- Parent: Shagisharip Shaimukhammetovich (father)

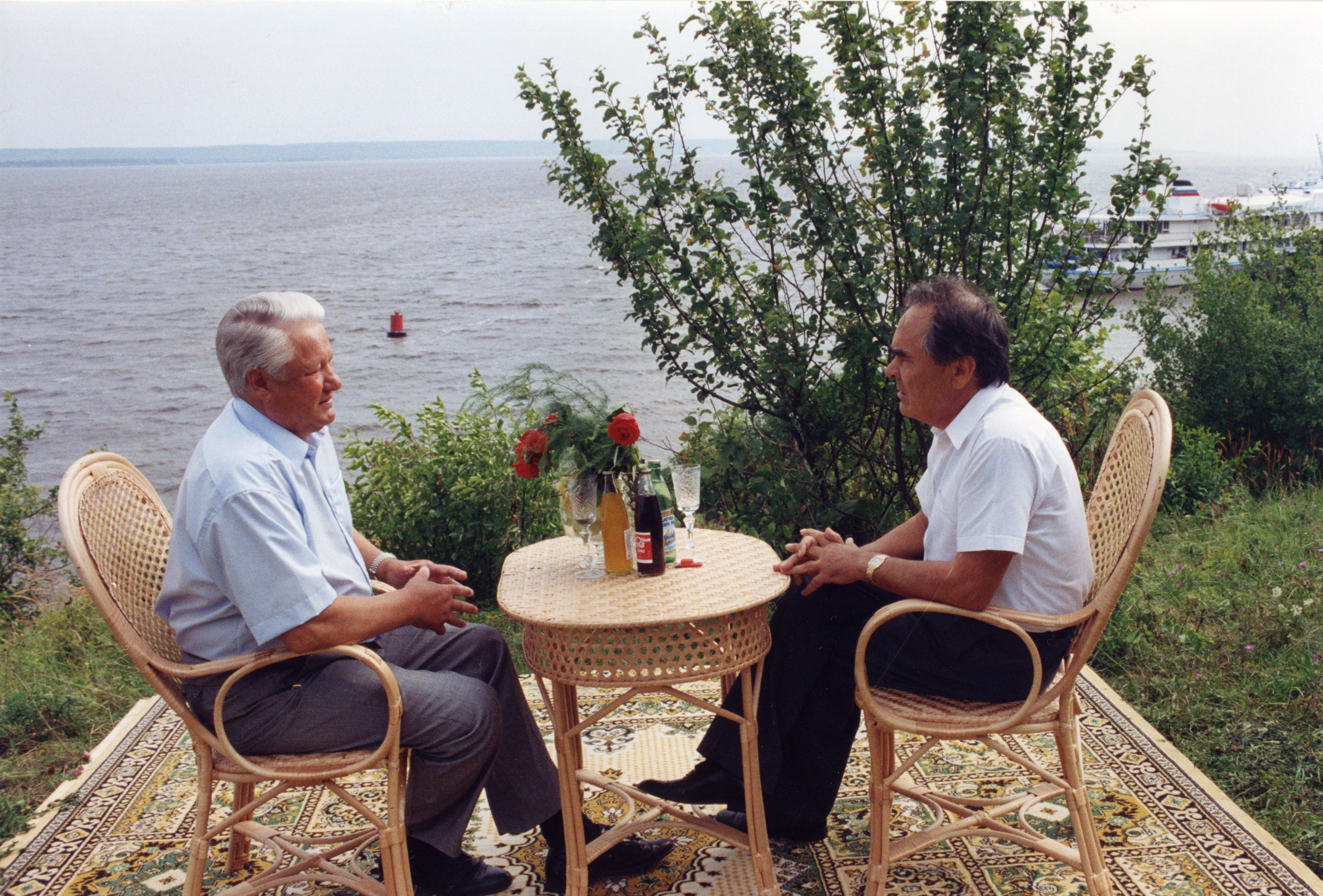
Shaimiev with president Boris Yeltsin in 1994

Mintimer Sharipovich Shaimiev (Note: Also spelled Shaymiyev, according to the rules of the Anglo-Russian romanization system used on this site.) (Note: Tatar: Минтимер Шәрип улы Шәймиев, romanized: Mintimer Şärip ulı Şäymiyew; Russian: Минтимер Шарипович Шаймиев) (born 20 January 1937) is a Russian former politician who served as the president of Tatarstan from 1991 to 2010. He was re-elected as president in 1996, 2001, and 2005.

== Biography ==
Mintimer Shaimiev was born in the village of Anyakovo, in Aktanyshsky District of the Tatar ASSR, as the son of Shagisharip Shaimukhammetovich (Şahişərip Şəymöxəmmət ulı). Shaimiev graduated from the Kazan Agricultural Institute in 1959, and worked as an agricultural engineer. He joined the Communist Party in 1963. In 1967 he was an instructor and deputy head of the agricultural department at Tatarstan's regional party organization. In 1969 Shaimiev was appointed Minister for Amelioration and Water Economy of his republic and in 1983 he became the first deputy chair of the Tatar Council of Ministers. In September 1989 Shaimiev became first secretary of Tatarstan's Communist Party organization. In the same year he was elected to the Congress of Peoples's Deputies. In April 1990 he was elected speaker of Tatarstan's Supreme Soviet. On 31 August 1990, the Supreme Soviet proclaimed the sovereignty of Tatarstan.

=== President of Tatarstan ===
On 12 June 1991, Shaimiev was elected President of the Tatar Soviet Socialist Republic and as President issued a declaration during the attempted coup of August 1991 in Moscow supporting the position of the Emergency Committee. In March 1992 he held a referendum on Tatarstan's sovereignty during which 62 percent of the voters cast their ballots in favor of sovereignty. That year, his first state visit outside the country was to Kazakhstan, where he was received by President Nursultan Nazarbayev with honors.

Saying that he wanted to make way for a new generation of leadership—in accordance with a call from President Dmitry Medvedev—Shaimiev told Medvedev in January 2010 that he did not want to be nominated for another term as President of Tatarstan. He said that Rustam Minnikhanov, the Prime Minister of Tatarstan, was his preferred successor. Medvedev then nominated Minnikhanov to succeed Shaimiev on 27 January 2010.

=== Other ventures ===
In 2001, he and Moscow's Mayor Yuri Luzhkov founded the United Russia party. He became State Counselor of Republic of Tatarstan shortly after resignation. Also he works as chairman of "Yanarysh" Foundation.

In 2017, he was named UNESCO Goodwill Ambassador for intercultural dialogue.

== Honours and awards ==
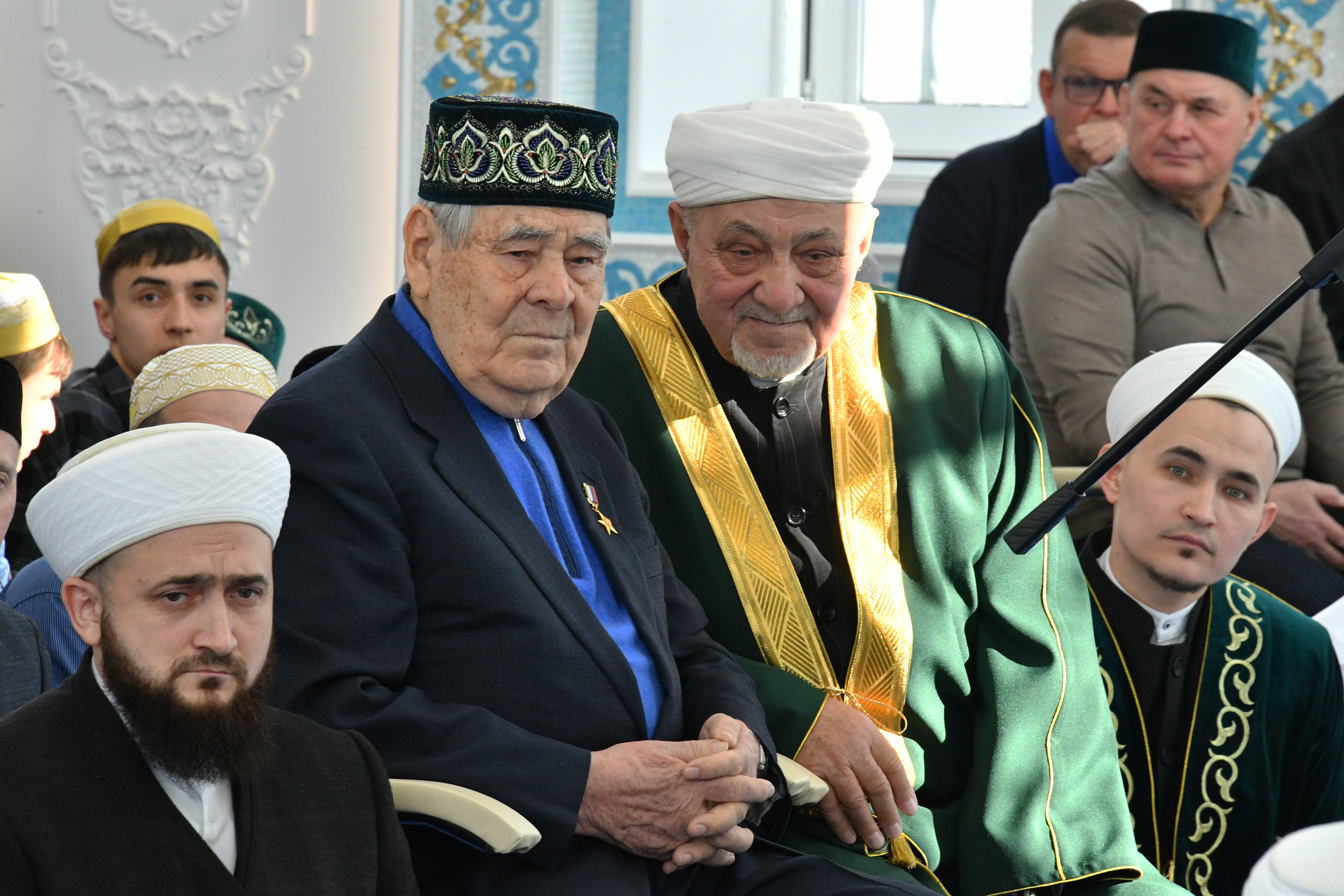
Shaimiev in the White Mosque in Tatarstan, 26 February 2024

- Order of Lenin (1966)
- Order of the October Revolution (1976)
- Order of the Red Banner of Labour (1971)
- Order of Friendship of Peoples (1987)
- Order of Merit for the Fatherland;
  - 1st class (20 January 2007) – for outstanding contribution to strengthening Russian statehood, and socio-economic development
  - 2nd class (17 January 1997) – for his great personal contribution to strengthening and development of Russian statehood, friendship and cooperation between nations
  - 3rd class (6 February 2010) – for outstanding contribution to the socio-economic development of the long and diligent work
  - 4th class (14 January 2014)
- PM pistol award (20 January 2002)
- Sword inscribed "East" (a replica of Iranian sabre "Shamshir" of the 16th century)
- Diploma of the President of the Russian Federation (12 December 2008) – for active participation in the drafting of the Constitution and a great contribution to the democratic foundations of the Russian Federation
- Order "For merits before Republic of Tatarstan" (2010)
- Order "Honor and Glory", 2nd class (Abkhazia, 2003) – for his significant contribution to strengthening peace and friendly relations in the Caucasus and the active help and support for Abkhazia
- Order of Holy Prince Daniel of Moscow, 1st class (Russian Orthodox Church, 1997)
- Order of St. Sergius, 1st class (Russian Orthodox Church, 2005)
- Breastplate of the Foreign Ministry of Russia "for contribution to international cooperation" (2007)
- Diploma of the Government of the Russian Federation (1997)
- State Prize for peace and progress of the First President of the Republic of Kazakhstan (2005)
- Honorary Citizen of Kazan (2005)
- Order of Honour "Al-Fahr", 1st class (June 2005)
- International Prize of King Faisal (Saudi Arabia) – "for his contribution to the revival of Islamic culture" (2007)
- Honorary Member of the Russian Academy of Arts
- Olympic Order (2008) – "for his outstanding contribution to the development of the Olympic movement."
- Order of Friendship, 1st class (Kazakhstan, 2010)

== Gallery ==
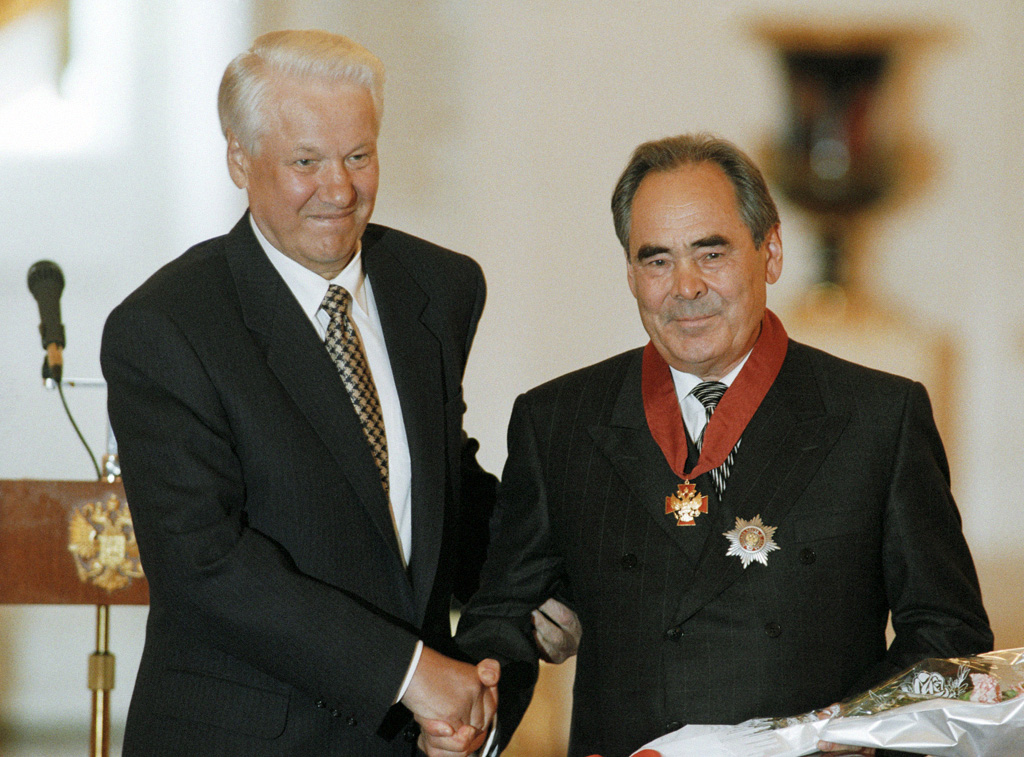
Awarding of the Order "For Merit to the Fatherland", 2nd degree (May 19, 1997)

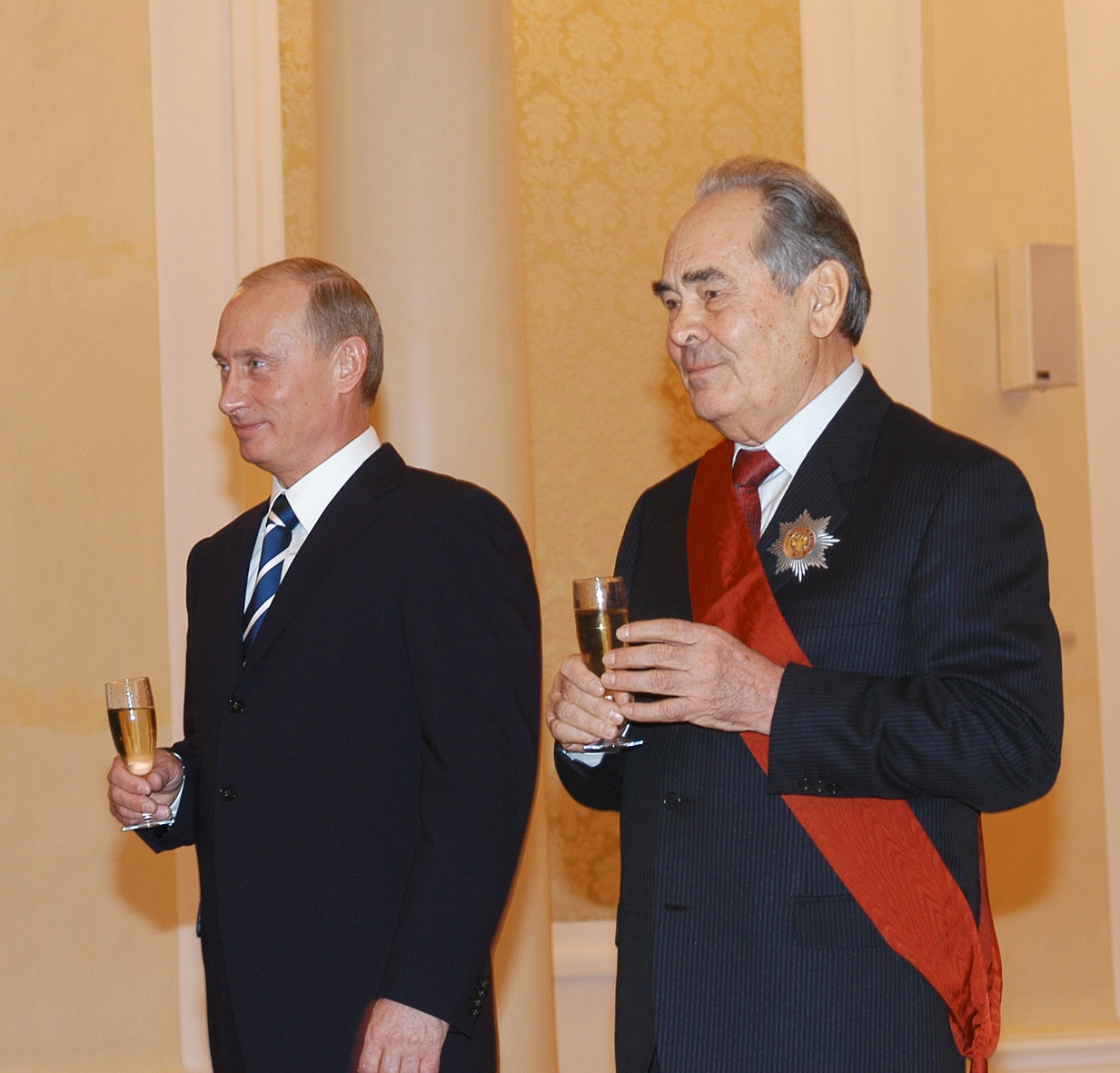
Awarding of the Order "For Merit to the Fatherland", 1st degree (January 20, 2007)

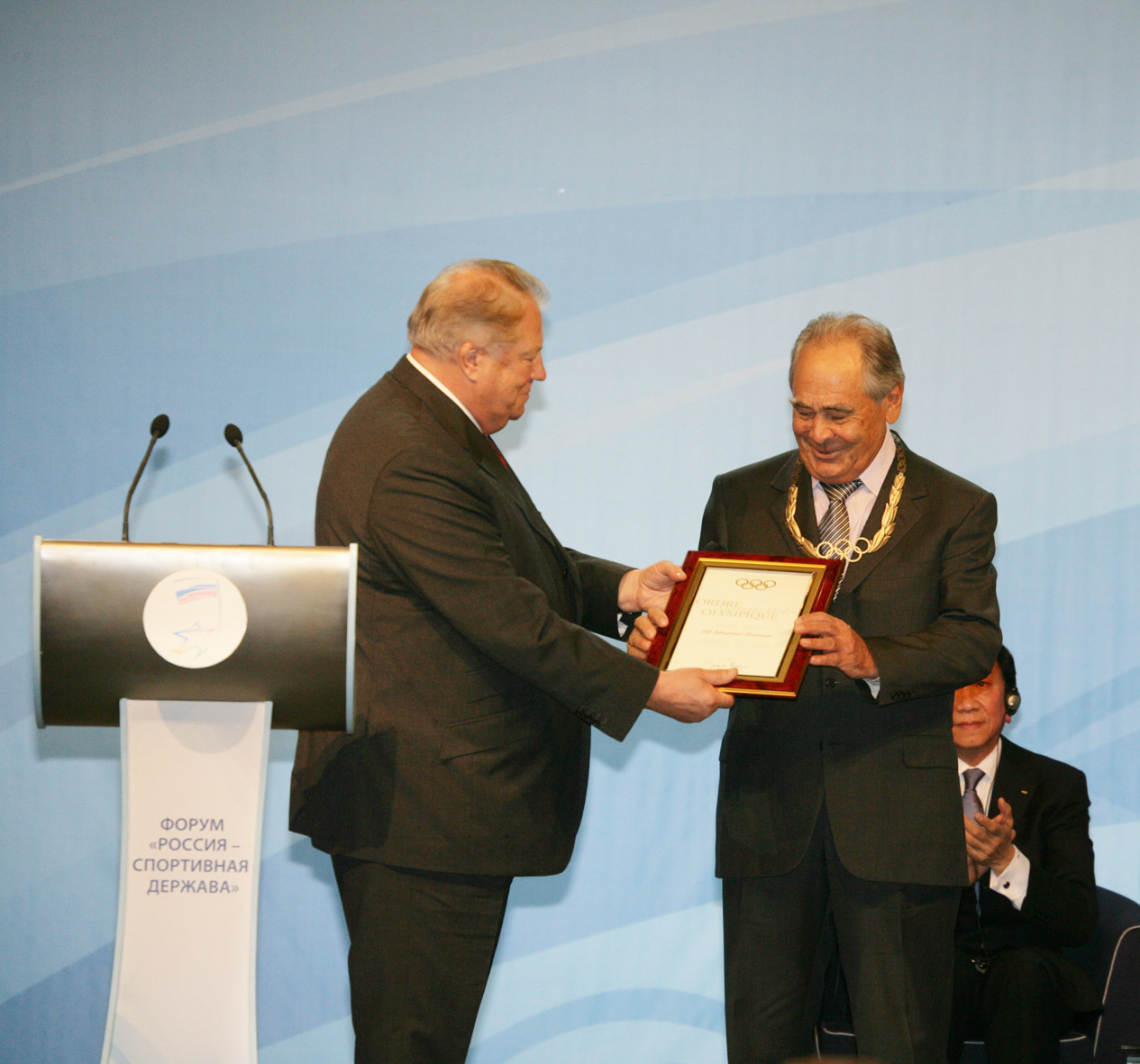
Awarding of the Silver Olympic Order (October 23, 2009)

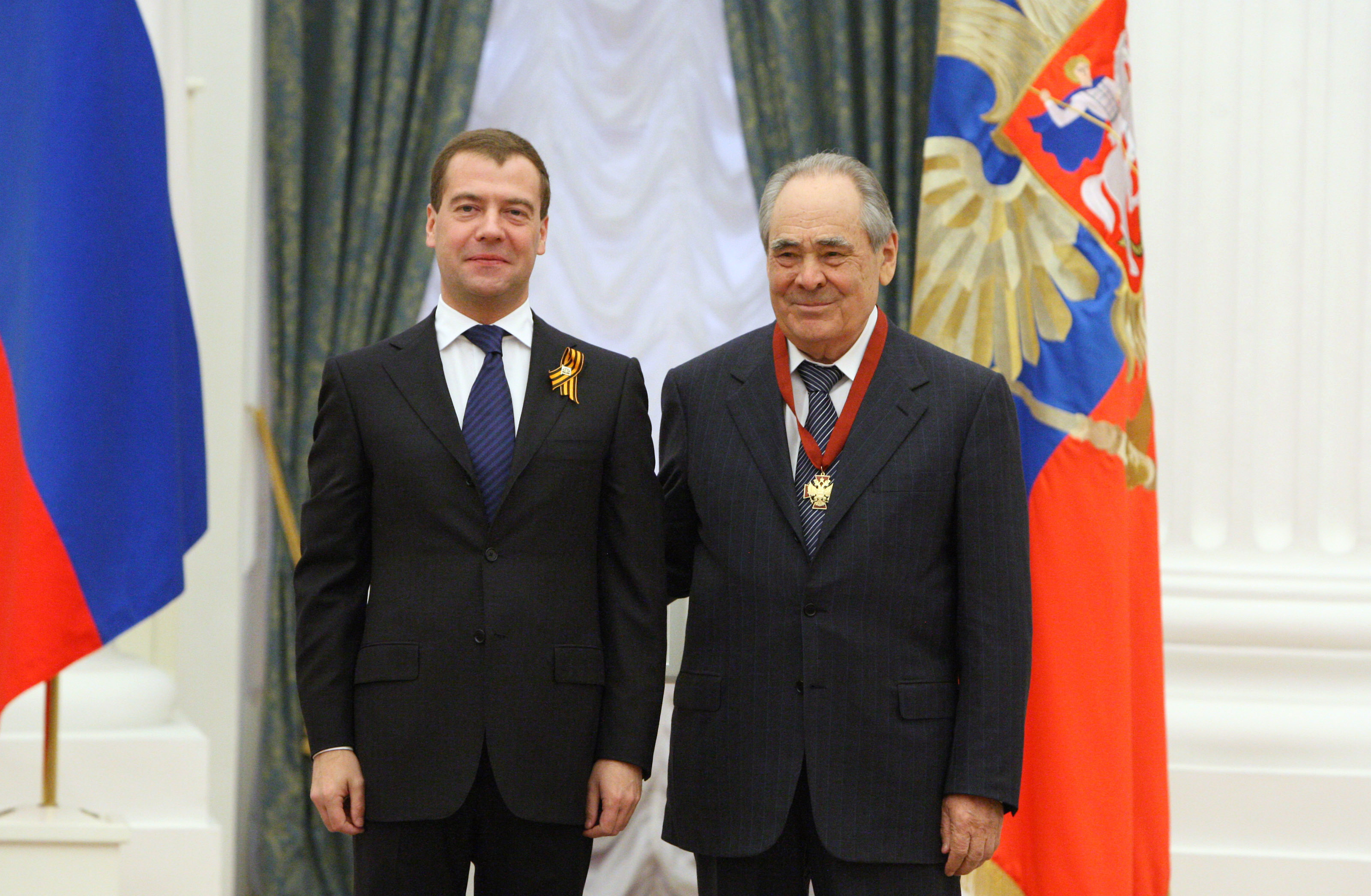
Awarding of the Order "For Merit to the Fatherland", 3rd degree (May 6, 2010)

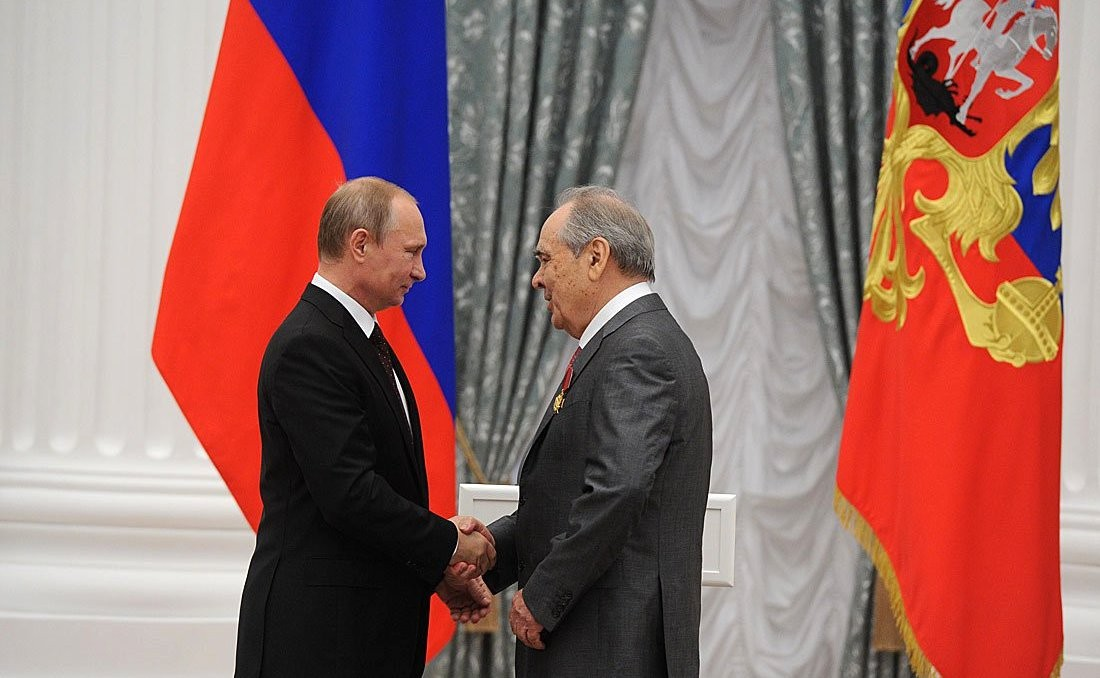
Awarding of the Order "For Merit to the Fatherland", 4th degree (July 31, 2014)

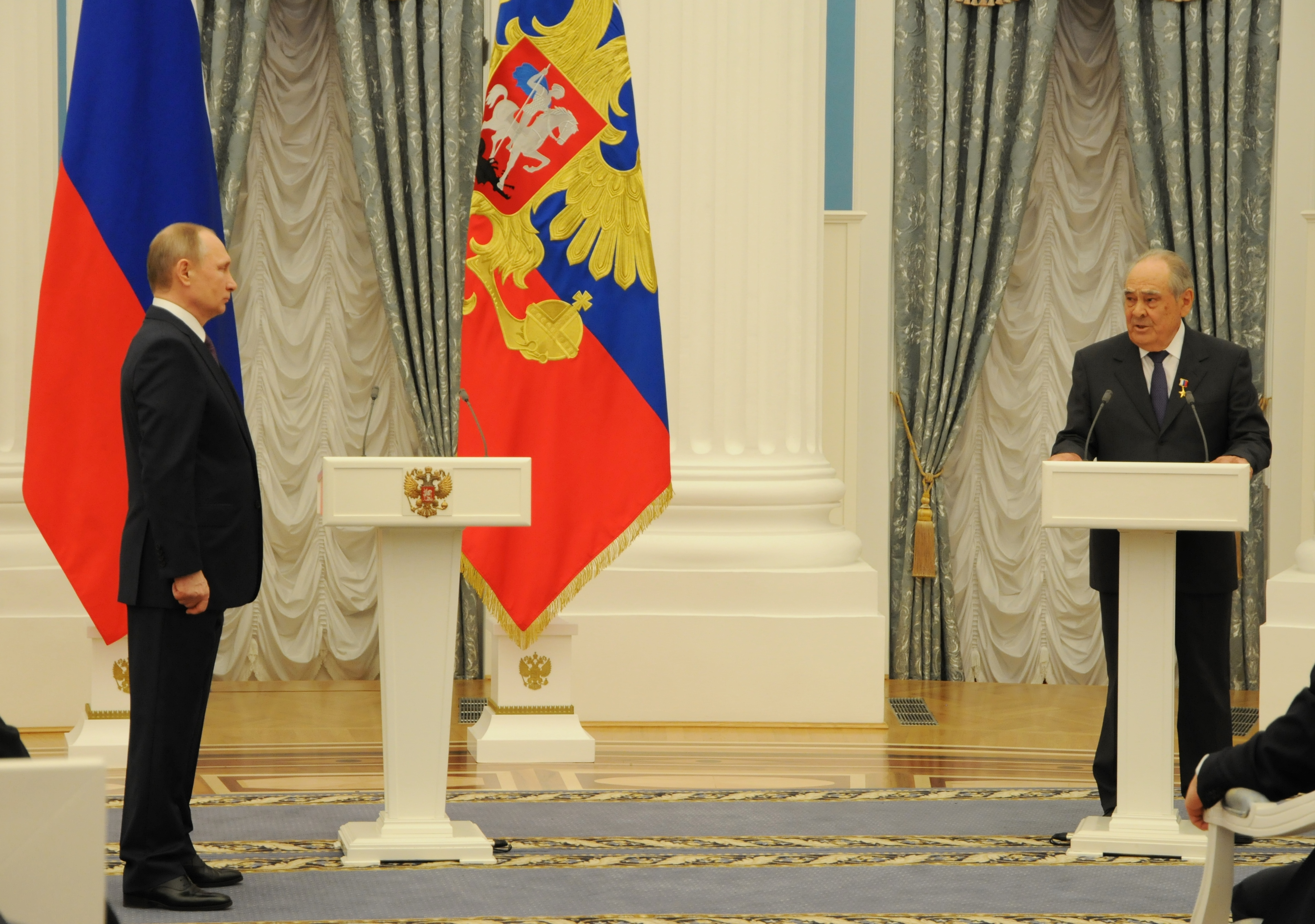
Awarding of the Star of Hero of Labour of the Russian Federation (April 28, 2017)

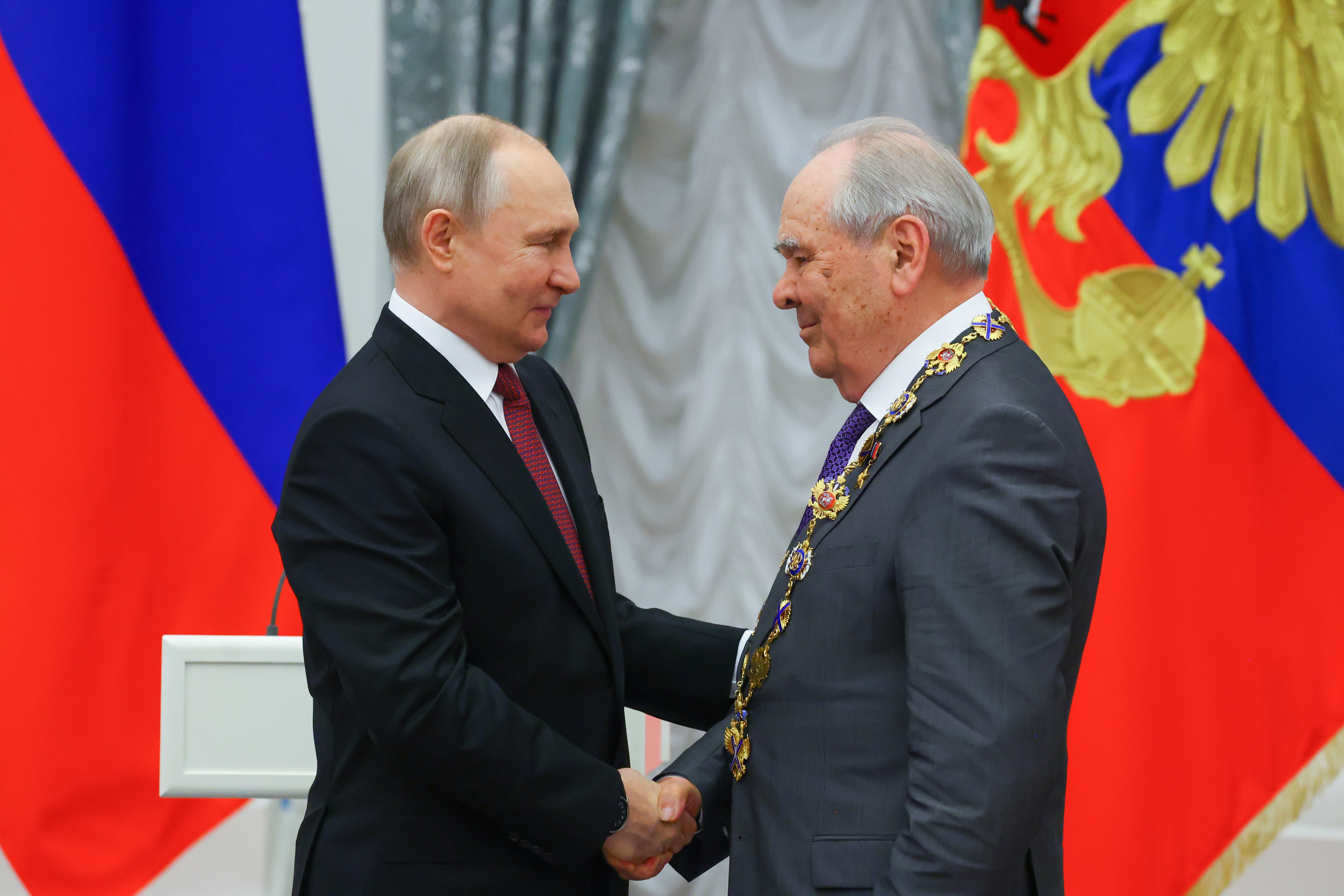
Awarding of the Order of St. Andrew (May 23, 2023)

== Notes ==
Political offices
Preceded by Office established	President of Tatarstan; 12 June 1991 – 25 March 2010	Succeeded by Rustam Minnikhanov
Awards
Preceded by Salih bin Abdulrahman Al-Husayyin	Winner of King Faisal International Prize; 2007	Succeeded by King Abdullah of Saudi Arabia
Preceded by Yusuf bin Jasim bin Muhammad Al-Hidji	Winner of King Faisal International Prize; 2007	Succeeded by King Abdullah of Saudi Arabia
