= Änäk =

Änäk Әнәк
- derevnya
- Location within Tatarstan
- Country: Russia
- Region: Tatarstan
- District: Aqtanış District
- Time zone: UTC+3:00

Änäk (Tatar: Әнәк; Russian: Аняково, romanized: Anyakovo) is a rural locality (a derevnya) in Aqtanış District, Tatarstan. The population was 262 as of 2010. Änäk is located 49 km from Aqtanış, district's administrative centre, and 323 km from Qazan, republic's capital, by road. The village was established in 1600s of 1700s. There are 5 streets in the village.
