= Olı Cäke =

Olı Cäke Олы Җәке
- selo
- Location within Tatarstan
- Country: Russia
- Region: Tatarstan
- District: Yäşel Üzän District
- Time zone: UTC+3:00

Olı Cäke (Tatar: Олы Җәке, romanized: Olı Cäke) is a rural locality (a selo) in Yäşel Üzän District, Tatarstan. The population was 588 as of 2010. Olı Cäke is located 32 km from Yäşel Üzän, district's administrative centre, and 43 km from Qazan, republic's capital, by road. The village already existed during the period of the Qazan Khanate. There are 13 streets in the village.
