= Drozhzhanovsky District =

Drozhzhanovsky District Дрожжановский район (Russian)
- District

Other transcription(s)
  - Tatar: Чүпрәле районы
  - Chuvash: Çĕпрел районĕ
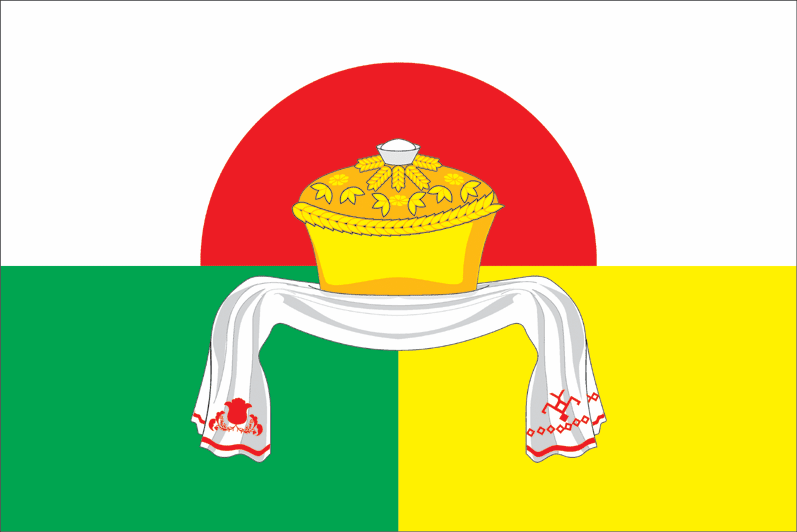
- Flag Coat of arms
- Location of Drozhzhanovsky District in the Republic of Tatarstan
- Coordinates: 54°46′N 47°38′E
- Country: Russia
- Federal subject: Republic of Tatarstan
- Established: 10 August 1930
- Administrative center: Staroye Drozhzhanoye

Area
  - Total: 1,029.5 km^{2} (397.5 sq mi)

Population (2010 Census)
  - Total: 25,753
  - Density: 25.015/km^{2} (64.789/sq mi)
  - Urban: 0%
  - Rural: 100%

Administrative structure
  - Inhabited localities: 52 rural localities

Municipal structure
  - Municipally incorporated as: Drozhzhanovsky Municipal District
  - Municipal divisions: 0 urban settlements, 19 rural settlements
- Time zone: UTC+3 (MSK)
- OKTMO ID: 92624000
- Website: http://drogganoye.tatarstan.ru/

Drozhzhanovsky District (Russian: Дрожжановский райо́н; Tatar: Чүпрәле районы; Chuvash: Çĕпрел районĕ, Śĕprel rayonĕ) — is a territorial administrative unit and municipal district of the Republic of Tatarstan within the Russian Federation. It is located in the southwestern part of Tatarstan. The administrative center of the district is the village of Staroye Drozhzhanoye. The district population at the beginning of 2020 was 21,569.

Drozhzhanovsky district is a predominantly agricultural region with gross domestic product of the agricultural sector amounting to 0.5 million rubles in 2020. Industry has also been actively developed in the district with the "Drozhzhanoe" industrial park designed for 21 residents operating in the district since 2014.

== Geography ==
Drozhzhanovsky district is located in the southwestern of Tatarstan and covers a total area is 1029.5 km^{2}. The Drozhzhanovsky district shares borders with the Buinsky District, Chuvashia, and the Ulyanovsk region. Its climate is continental and is dominated by westerly and south-westerly winds with the average monthly temperature in January is -11.5 °C, in July - + 19.1 °C. The largest river in the district is the 54 km long Malaya Tsilna which flows for 50 km through the district.

== Flag and Coat of Arms ==
The coat of arms of the Drozhzhanovsky district was approved on March 26, 2006. There is a red sun symbolizing hard work, longevity, and activity at the top of the coat of arms. The lower part of the coat of arms is divided in half by green and yellow vertical stripes. They indicate a mixed population. The national diversity of the inhabitants is also symbolized by a rushnyk. The main composition depicted on the coat of arms symbolizes the hospitality of local residents. The flag is based on heraldic elements of the coat of arms.

== History ==
=== Etymology ===
The Tatar name of the region sounds like Chүprәle (Чүпрәле), which in translation means "Yeasts" (rus. Дрожжи). Therefore the name of the region is a literal translation of the Tatar word. The village of Staroye Drozhzhanoe is located on swampy ground. When the first inhabitants tried the water, it gave off the odor of yeast. This story gave name to the district.

=== Background ===
The topography of the region is characterized dense forests, large lakes, swamps and bogs in more ancient times. Prehistoric animals and birds of that time including huge mammoths lived on the territory of the modern district. The development of the modern territory of the Drozhzhanovsky district began even during the reign of Volga Bulgaria. Settlements of Tatars appeared in the middle of the 17th century, including in particular the village of Ubei which was founded around this time. There are two versions of the origin of its name. According to the first, it comes from the Chuvash word "Uba (Bear). According to the second, it comes from the male Chuvash name "Upi.

The territory of the district belonged to the Buinsky Uyezd of the Simbirsk Governorate until 1920. The Drozhzhanovsky district was formed in 1930, but its borders changed several times after the abolition of the canton. Several village councils were transferred to the Budyonnovsky district. By the 1940s the Drozhzhanovsky district only encompassed 824 km^{2}. Later part of the territory of the abolished Tsilninsky district became part of the district on October 12, 1959. The Drozhzhanovsky district was completely abolished, transferring the land to the Buinsky district in 1963. Three years later in 1966 the Drozhzhanovsky district was reestablished within its modern borders which have remained relatively unchanged since.

=== Contemporary Drozhzhanovsky District ===
In 1998 the Drozhzhanovsky district was headed by Dzhevdet Gafurov. A criminal case was opened against him on the basis of the misuse of budgetary funds, which led to his resignation in 2006. Timur Nagumanov became the next head of the district administration in 2007. Following Nagumanov the head of the Drozhzhanovsky district has been Marat Gafarov since 2018.

== Demographics ==
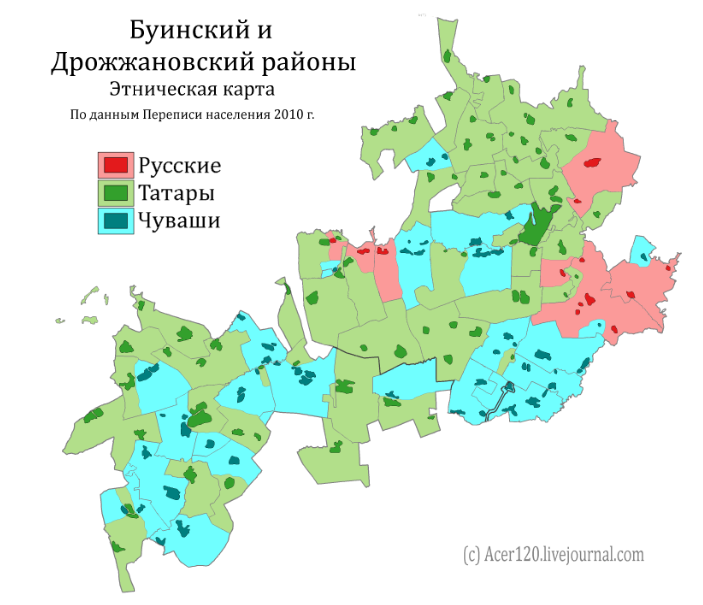
Ethnic map of the Buinsky and Drozhzhanovsky districts

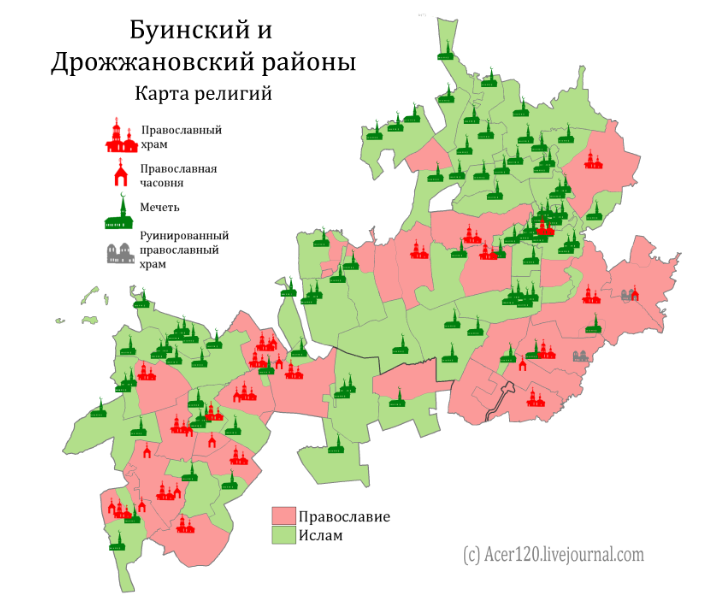
Religious map of the Buinsky and Drozhzhanovsky districts

According to statistics from January 2020, 21,569 people live in the Drozhzhanovsky district [4]. The population of the district is mixed with Tatars making up 57.5% Chuvash 41.1% and Russians 1.1%.

== Municipal Territorial Organization ==
There are 52 settlements in Drozhzhanovsky district, grouped into 19 rural settlements [5]. The administrative centers of rural settlements are the villages Tatarskiy Saplyk, Bolshaya Aksa, Bolshaya Tsilna, Gorodishche, Khornovar-Shigali, Malaya Tsilna, Nizhniy Karakitan, Mataki, Nizhneye Chekurskoye, Burunduki, Novoye Il'movo, Novyye Ishli, Ubey, Staroye Drozhzhanoye, Staryye Kakerli, Staryye Chukaly, Staroye Shaymurzino, Chuvashskoye Drozhzhanoye, and Shlanga.

== Economy ==
=== Industry ===
The magazine Realnoe Vremya compiled a rating of the districts of Tatarstan in 2016 taking into account the level of wages, budgetary provision and investments in fixed assets. The Drozhzhanovsky district was an outlier in terms of average salaries which averaged 20 thousand rubles and nd for the first half of 2020 investment in fixed assets excluding expenditures from budgetary funds amounted to 465 million rubles.

Among the large industrial enterprises in the region is Drozhzhanovskiy butter and cheese plant. The largest regional and main town-forming enterprise is "Drozhzhanovsky elevator", which unites a feed mill, a mill, a grain elevator and the agricultural enterprise "Burunduki". "Burundukovsky elevator" (the old name) ranked second among the enterprises of Tatarstan in terms of grain processing capacity in 2009. The elevator received a loan for 2.4 billion rubles in 2013. A year later the company incurred losses of 1.4 billion rubles. Machinery and equipment of the company were pledged by "Rosselkhozbank", and shares were held by "Tatfondbank". Due to its bankruptcy, the company's property was put up for auction in 2016. The only participant in the auction was the "Yurkom" company, which purchased everything for 1.7 billion rubles and "Burundukovsky elevator" was renamed. The revenue of the company was 240.15 million rubles, which ultimately did not save the company from repeated bankruptcy which was announced shortly after in 2019. The property of "Burundukovsky elevator" was estimated at the time as 285 million rubles.

At the end of 2015, the municipal council of the Drozhzhanovsky district developed a draft law "On special economic zones at the regional level" and submitted it to the State Council of Tatarstan. According to the text of the project, SEZs (Special economic zones) of four types can be located on the territories of the republic's municipalities and local authorities can initiate the creation of SEZs. Among the benefits for residents of SEZs are a decrease in the rate of income tax credited to the republican budget, and property tax incentives. But the law was not adopted in 2019. Representatives of the Drozhzhanovsky District signed an agreement with Chinese investors on the construction of a cement plant in March 2015. The estimated volume of investment was 9 billion rubles and one of the conditions for cooperation was the provision of jobs for local residents. The project planned to employ about 200 people at the plant. However, a year later, district leadership announced the canceling of the project.

Since 2013, Volga region Zeolites has been operating in the region, developing the Tatarsko-Shatrashan deposit zeolite-containing rocks and producing a product under the Zeol trademark, which delivers its products to Kazakhstan, Belarus, Bahrain, and Saudi Arabia.

=== Agriculture ===
Spring and winter wheat, rye, barley, oats, millet, buckwheat, peas, sugar beets and potatoes are cultivated in the Drozhzhanovsky district. The livestock industries in the district are meat and dairy cattle breeding, pig breeding and sheep breeding. 94 farms and 8260 private households are registered in the district for 2016, producing 35% of the total quantity of milk and 41% of meat produced in the district. According to the regional plan, in 2021 the profit from the agricultural sector should amount to 316 million rubles of profit from agriculture mainly due to the production of grain and high-margin crops (sugar beets, sunflowers) and an increase in the number of dairy cows. For the first half of 2020 the gross value of agricultural products produced in the district had already amounted to 431 million rubles. There are 37 milk collectors in the region. A dairy plant subsidiary of the "Vamin" company operated in the district until its bankruptcy after 2013. Following the initiation of bankruptcy procedures, the property of the dairy plant was leased to the "Prosto Moloko" firm. At the moment, production facilities at the plant are used only for cooling dairy products. The district administration is ready to invest in production as soon as the issue of ownership is resolved.

The Drozhzhanovsky district has been a participant in the mini-farm construction program since 2015. A resident of the village of Bolshaya Tsilna received a regional subsidy of 400 thousand rubles for the development of his farm in 2019. During the year the farm's livestock was doubled, and the proceeds from production amounted to 1.3 million rubles. The leader in milk production in the region is the "Tsilna" enterprise. The enterprise produces milk at a rate of 25 liters of milk per cow. At the same time, in 2017, the volume of milk production over eight months amounted to 17.5 thousand tons. Other large agricultural plants include "Agrofirma imeni Dementieva" in the village of Novy Ubei and the branch of the agricultural firm "Ak Bars Drozhzhanoe" in the village of Shlanga .

In 2020, an outbreak of Avian influenza occurred in Tatarstan, affecting poultry farms in almost all regions. The disease was caused by contact between wild birds and poultry. Local farm birds were killed and burned to prevent the spread of the epidemic.

=== Investment potential ===
In 2012 the industrial site "Promzona-Centralnaya" with an area of 10 hectares was established in the village of Staroye Drozhzhanoe [53]. Shortly afterwards in 2014 the "Drozhzhanoe" industrial park designed to improve the economic situation in the region was created in the district. The following incentives are provided for residents: income tax reduced by 4.5%, property tax reduced by 22 times. The first resident of the park was the Moscow company "Formplast", which produces polymer products. Its initial investment in the park amounted to 16 million rubles in 2017. The project includes the creation of 900 jobs on the territory of the industrial park by 2021, and in total there the park hopes to attract be about 20 residents.

The "Pektin" company proposed plans for a biotechnopark project for the processing of agricultural products worth about 1.3 billion rubles and employing 170 people in 2020. The main task of the enterprise will be to provide the food and processing industry with domestic ingredients. A plot of 5 hectares has already been allocated for construction in the district. The company is looking for investors at the end of 2020.

=== Transport ===
Two federal highways pass through the district: the "M5 Ural", which is part of the European network of the E30 route and Asian AH6 as well as the M7 Volga, part of the European E017 highway connecting the European part of Russia with Siberia and the Far East. In 2016, the length of the public road network was 548.3 km.

A section of the federal railway "Kazan-Ulyanovsk" runs through the district. The village of Staroe Drozhzhanoe is located 45 km from the Burunduki station. There are no air or river ports in the region. The priority tasks for the development of transport services until 2030 are the creation of conditions for the uninterrupted operation of passenger transport in the district and the maintenance of regional highways in a safe condition.

== Environment ==
There are six natural monuments that have the status of a special protected area: the meadow "Bibi-Aisha", the forest-steppe "Keremet", the "Source of the Tsilna River", "Chistaya Polyana", "Ravine Shereldauk" and "Mordovian meadows". Numerous species of animals and plants live in specially protected zones, including endangered species and varieties listed in the Red Book of Tatarstan.

An ancient spring is located in the village of Starye Chukaly on the left bank of the river. When it was finally overgrown with reeds, and the water became unfit for drinking, the district authorities asked for a Presidential grant for its cleaning and creation of public space in 2018 but the project did not receive support. There is one more spring "Kader" ("Spring of honor") in the regional center Staroye Drozhzhanoe.

== Social Welfare and Public Life ==
In 2019 the education system in the district included 24 general education and 8 secondary schools. There is a youth sports school with 600 students enrolled in various sports programs including hockey, football, skiing, kurash, boxing, volleyball, and basketball. The district also hosts 49 houses of culture, 21 clubs, 32 libraries, two museums, and a music school. In 2020, the Drozhzhanovsky district was included in the top ten districts supporting in sports in the republic. According to the data, 53% of the district population participate in sports.

There are several notable cultural heritage sites in the Drozhzhanovsky district, including the House of the merchant Vasily Vassiyarov.

== Famous people ==
There are many famous natives from the region, among them the founder of the Chuvash drama Nikolai Efremov, People's Artist of the Republic of Tatarstan Khidiyat Sultanov, poets and writers Sharaf Mudaris, Tal-Morza, Zaki Nuri.

- Akhmetgari Abdreev - Hero of Socialist Labor. Born in 1923 in the village of Staroye Shaimurzino
- Usman Aliyev - Hero of Socialist Labor. Born in 1924 in the village of Bolshaya Tsilna
- Zarif Alimov - Hero of the Soviet Union. Born in 1921 in the village of Nizhnie Kakerli
- Ziatdin Arslanov - a holder of the Orders of Glory. Born in 1923 in the village of Malaya Tsilna
- Pyotr Dementyev - twice Hero of Socialist Labor, Minister of the Aviation Industry of the USSR. Born in 1907 in the village of Ubei
- Lazar Dergunov - Hero of Socialist Labor. Born in 1907 in the village of Novy Ubei
- Alexander Mokshin - Hero of Socialist Labor. Born in 1927 in the village of Gorodische
- Saifikhan Nafiev - a former prosecutor and chairman of the Constitutional Court of Tatarstan
- Sergei Nemasev - Hero of Socialist Labor. Born in the village of Mochaley
- Konstantin Prokopyev - ethnographer, clergyman, teacher. Born in 1872 in Novoye Ilmovo
- Ravil Nizamutdinov - Hero of Socialist Labor. Born in 1929 in the village of Novye Chukaly
- Abdulla Sabirzyanov - Hero of Socialist Labor. Born in 1900 in the village of Mochaley
- Semyon Uganin - participant of the Great Patriotic War, Hero of the Soviet Union. Born in 1924 in the village of Mataki
- Nurrula Fazlaev - Hero of the Soviet Union. Born in 1909 in the village of Mochaley
- Gazinur Khairullin - Hero of Russia. Born in 1961 in the village of Staroe Drozhzhanoe
- Ismagil Khakimov - Hero of the Soviet Union. Born in 1916 in the village of Bolshaya Tsilna
- Pyotr Yukhvitov - Hero of the Soviet Union. Born in 1918 in the village of Hornovar-Shigali
