= Farid Mukhametshin =

Russian politician (born 1947)

- Фарид Мухаметшин; Фәрит Мөхәммәтшин
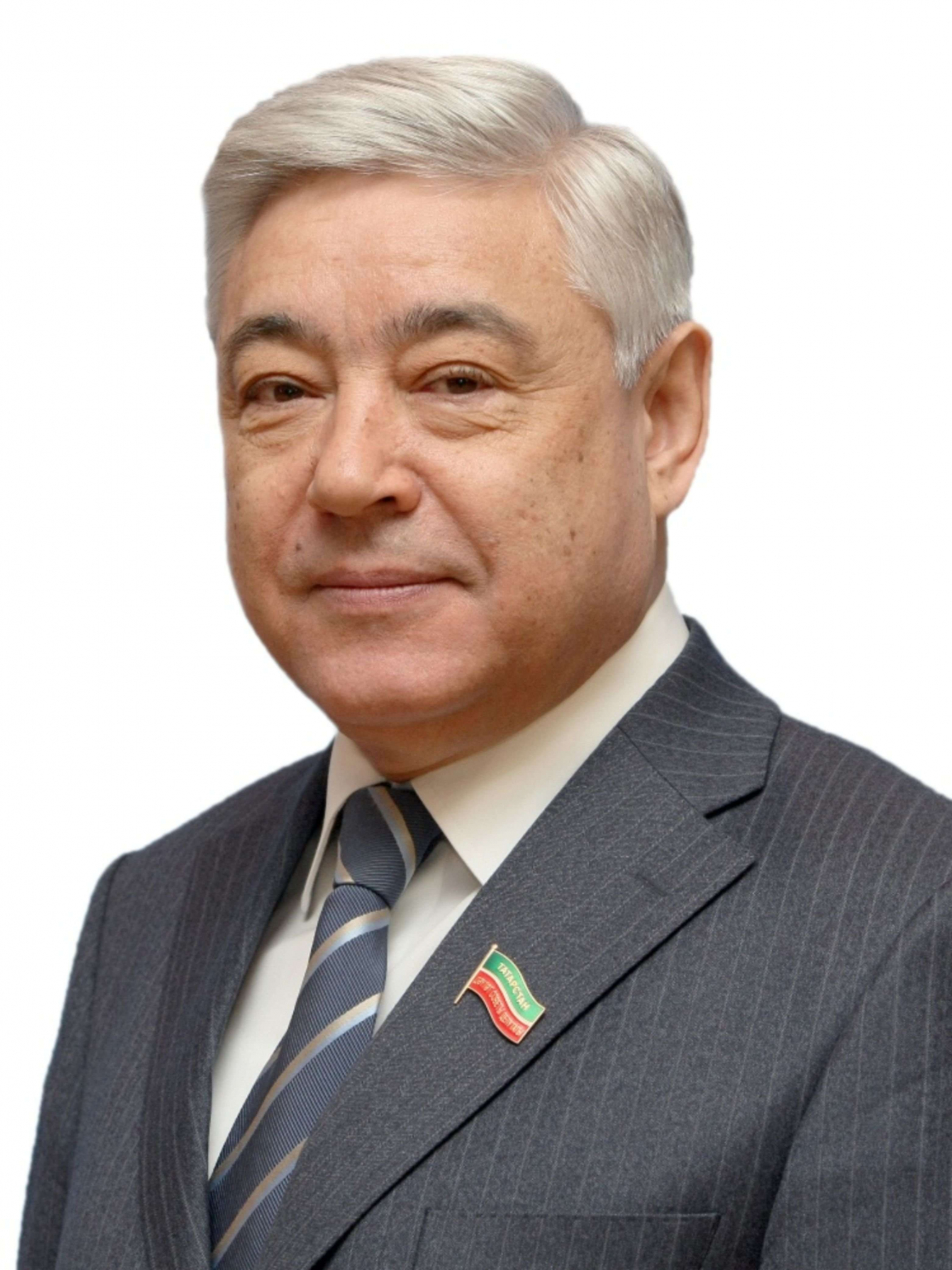
- Official portrait

Prime Minister of Tatarstan
- In office 16 January 1995 – 28 May 1998
- President: Mintimer Shaimiev
- Preceded by: Mukhammat Sabirov
- Succeeded by: Mintimer Shaimiev (acting)

Chairman of the State Council of Tatarstan
- Incumbent
- Assumed office 27 May 1998
- Preceded by: Vasily Likhachyov

Personal details
- Born: 22 May 1947 (age 79) Almetyevsk, Tatar ASSR, Russian SFSR, Soviet Union
- Party: United Russia
- Other political affiliations: Tatarstan – New Age
- Education: Ufa State Petroleum Technological University

Farid Khayrullovich Mukhametshin (Note: Russian: Фарид Хайруллович Мухаметшин; Tatar: Фәрит Хәйрулла улы Мөхәммәтшин, romanized: Färit Häyrulla ulı Möhämmätşin) (born 22 May 1947) is a Russian politician and a former prime minister of Tatarstan. He is an ethnic Tatar.

== Biography ==
Mukhametshin was born 22 May 1947 in Almetyevsk, Tatar ASSR, Russian SFSR, Soviet Union.

He began his career in 1963 as a turner at the Almetyevsk gas and gasoline plant, and as a driver for the Almetyevburneft trust’s motor transport office.

From 1966 to 1968 he served in the Soviet Army. After completing military service, he worked as a fitter at the Almetyevneft oil production department until 1970.

=== Political career ===
He was elected in March 1994 to the upper chamber of the Federal Assembly of Russia.

He was chairman of the Supreme Council and State Council of Tatarstan Republic from July 1991 to January 1995. He is the current chairman of the State Council of Tatarstan Republic since 27 May 1998.

== Notes ==
Preceded by Mukhammat Sabirov	Prime minister of Tatarstan; January 17, 1995 – May 27, 1998	Succeeded by Mintimer Shaeymiev (acting)
