= State Council of the Republic of Tatarstan =

Regional parliament of Tatarstan, Russia

Coordinates: 55°47′52″N 49°07′32″E

State Council of the Republic of Tatarstan Государственный Совет Республики Татарстан
- 7th legislature

Type
- Type: Unicameral

Leadership
- Chairman: Farid Mukhametshin, Tatarstan — New Age

Structure
- Seats: 100
- Political groups: United Russia (82) CPRF (6); LDPR (1); SRZP (1); New People (2) Independent (1)

Elections
- Voting system: Mixed
- Last election: 8 September 2024
- Next election: 2029

Meeting place

Website
- gossov.tatarstan.ru

The State Council of the Republic of Tatarstan (Russian: Государственный Совет Республики Татарстан; Tatar: Татарстан Республикасы Дәүләт Советы, romanized: Tatarstan Respublikası Däwlät Sovetı) is the regional parliament of Tatarstan, a federal subject of Russia. It consists of 100 deputies elected for five-year terms; 50 deputies are elected by single-member constituencies while the other 50 are elected in party lists.

The presiding officer is the Chairman of the State Council.

== Elections ==
=== 2019 ===
Party	%	Seats
United Russia	72.43	85
Communist Party of the Russian Federation	10.74	6
A Just Russia	3.96	1
Liberal Democratic Party of Russia	3.79	1
Party of Growth	1.82	1
Independent	—	6
Communists of Russia	3.65	0
Russian Party of Pensioners for Social Justice	2.47	0
Registered voters/turnout	70.08	

=== 2024 ===
Party	%	Seats
United Russia	76.75	86
Communist Party of the Russian Federation	10.54	6
A Just Russia	3.27	1
Liberal Democratic Party of Russia	4.41	2
New People	4.21	2
Independent	—	6
Registered voters/turnout	71.58	

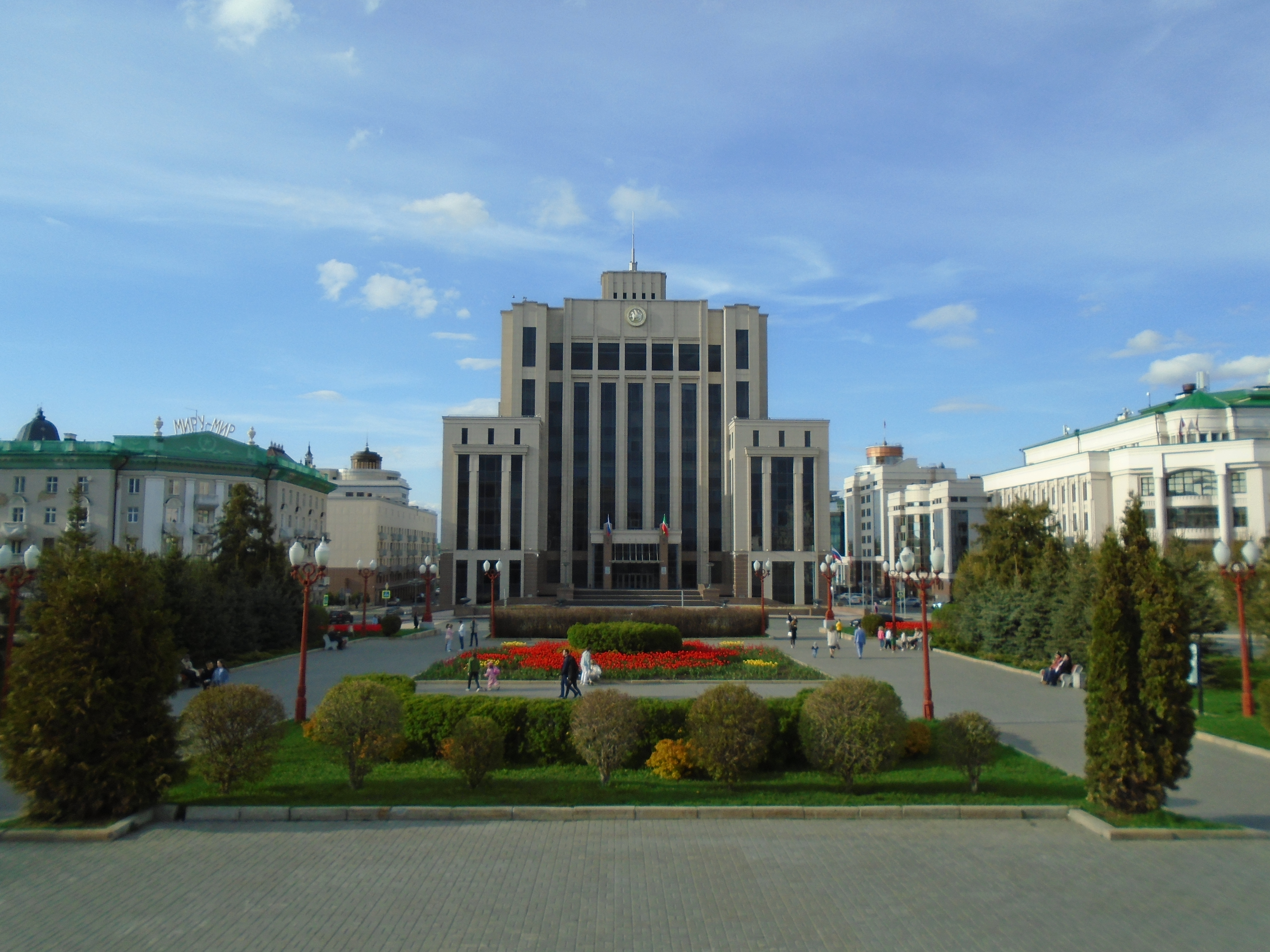
The Government House in Kazan on Freedom Square

== See also ==
- List of Chairmen of the State Council of the Republic of Tatarstan
