= State Anthem of Tatarstan =

Татарстан Республикасының Дәүләт гимны
English: State Anthem of the Republic of Tatarstan
- Coat of arms of Tatarstan
- Regional anthem of Tatarstan (Russia)
- Lyrics: Ramazan Baytimerov, 2013
- Music: Röstäm Yaxin
- Adopted: 1993

Audio sample
- 2013 official orchestral and choral vocal recording in D-flat major: file; help

Official orchestral instrumental recording in D-flat major

The State Anthem of the Republic of Tatarstan (Note: Tatar: Татарстан Җөмһүрияте Дәүләт гимны, romanized: Tatarstan Cömhüriyəte Dəwlət gimnı, pronounced [tʌˌtʌrɤ̆sˈtɑn ʑɵ̆mˌhʉrijæˈtɘ̆ dæwˈlæt gimˈnɤ̆]) was composed by Tatar musician Röstäm Yaxin and was first adopted in 1993 without lyrics. 20 years later, lyrics written by Ramazan Baytimerov were made official.

== Lyrics ==
=== Current version ===
On 21 February 2013, the Parliament of Tatarstan unanimously approved lyrics written by Baytimerov. The final lyrics of the anthem is based on the poem «Туган ягым» ('Native Land') by Ramazan Baytimerov, as is known from a story written by him in the 1970s. Many unknown authors took part in the revision of the poems. Baytimerov's poems inspired the composer Röstäm Yaxin to compose a song, the melody of which became the national anthem of Tatarstan in 1993. The new lyrics of the anthem consists of the first two verses sung in Tatar, followed by two verses sung in Russian. The lyrics were translated into Russian by Assyrian-Russian poet Filipp Pirayev.

==== Tatar and Russian original ====
Cyrillic script

Мәңге яшә, газиз Ватаныбыз,
Халкым тели изге теләкләр!
Гомерлеккә якын туган булып
Яши бездә төрле милләтләр.

Күп гасырлар кичкән чал тарихлы
Данлы илем, үзең бер дастан!
𝄆 Синдә генә безнең язмышыбыз,
Республикам минем, Татарстан! 𝄇

Цвети, священная земля моя,
Да будет мирным твой небосвод!
Единый дом у нас, одна семья,
Живёт в согласии наш народ.

Богатый мудростью седых веков,
Надеждой, верою ты нам стал,
𝄆 И пусть хранит тебя моя любовь,
Моя Республика, мой Татарстан! 𝄇

Latin script

Mäñge yaşä, gaziz Watanıbız,
Xalkım teli izge teläklär!
Ğomerlekkä yakın tuğan bulıp
Yäşi bezdä törle millätlär.

Küp ğasırlar kiçkän çal tarixlı
Danlı ilem, üzeñ ber dastan!
𝄆 Sindä ğenä bezneñ yazmışıbız,
Respublikam minem, Tatarstan! 𝄇

Tsveti, svyashchennaya zemlya moya,
Da budet mirnym tvoy nebosvod!
Yedinyy dom u nas, odna sem'ya,
Zhivyot v soglasii nash narod.

Bogatyy mudrost'yu sedykh vekov,
Nadezhdoy, veroyu ty nam stal,
𝄆 I pust' khranit tebya moya lyubov',
Moya Respublika, moy Tatarstan! 𝄇

IPA transcription (Note: See: Help:IPA/Tatar, Tatar alphabet § Cyrillic version and Tatar language § Phonology; File:National Anthem of the Republic of Tatarstan with words.ogg, Help:IPA/Russian and Russian phonology.)

[mæŋˈɡɘ jæˈʃæ ʁʌˈziz | wʌˌtʌ.nɤˈbɤz |]
[χʌɫˈqɤm tɘˈli izˈgɘ | ˌtɘ.lækˈlær ‖]
[ʁɵˌmɘr.lɘkˈkæ jʌˈqɤn | tuˈʁɑn buˈɫɤp ǀ]
[jæˈʃi bɘzˈdæ tɵrˈlɘ | ˌmil.lætˈlær ‖]

[kʉp ˌʁʌ.sɤrˈɫɑr kiɕˈkæn | ɕɑɫ ˌtʌ.riχˈɫɤ |]
[dʌnˈɫɤ iˈlɘm ʉˈzɘŋ | bɘr dʌsˈtɑn ‖]
𝄆 [sinˈdæ gɘˈnæ bɘzˈnɘŋ | jʌzˌmɤ.ʃɤˈbɤz |]
[rɘsˌpub.liˈkɑm miˈnɘm ˌtʌ.tʌrˈstɑn ‖] 𝄇

[tsvʲɪˈtʲi svʲɪɕˈɕɛn.nʌ.jʌ | zʲɪˈmlʲa mʌˈja |]
[da ˈbu.dʲɪt ˈmʲir.nɨm tvoj | nʲɛ.bʌˈsvot ‖]
[jɪˈdʲi.nɨj dom u nas | ʌˈdna sʲɪˈmja |]
[ʐɨˈvʲɵt f‿sʌˈɡɫa.sʲɪ.(j)ɪ | naʂ nʌˈrot ‖]

[bʌˈɡa.tɨj ˈmu.drʌ.sʲtʲjʊ | sʲɪˈdɨɣ vʲɪˈkof |]
[nʌˈdʲɛ.ʐdʌj ˈvʲɛ.rʌ.jʊ | tɨ nam staɫ ‖]
𝄆 [i ˈpusʲtʲ xrʌˈnʲit tʲɪˈbʲa | mʌˈja lʲʊˈbofʲ ǀ]
[mʌˈja rʲɪˈspu.blʲɪ.kʌ | moj tʌ.tʌr.ˈstan ‖] 𝄇

==== English translation ====
Poetic

Live forever, motherland beloved,
With thee my folk are united.
With benevolence we are born,
With us do diverse folks thrive.

Since aeons thou hast a history grand,
My country bright and thy past bold.
𝄆 With thee we found ourselves again,
My dear Republic, O Tatarstan! 𝄇

Flourish, my hallowed land,
May thy peace fill thy sky.
In this vast family we are united,
Our folk live in harmony.

Our wisdom rich in ages ancient,
Thou art our only hope and faith.
𝄆 And may thy love fill thy heart,
My dear Republic – my Tatarstan! 𝄇

Literal

Live forever, beloved motherland,
My people are united with you!
We are born with generosity.
Different people live with us.

Since different generations, you have a beautiful history.
My glorious country, your history is heroic!
We found ourselves with you again,
My republic, Tatarstan!

Flourish, holy land,
Let thy peace fill your sky,
We are united in this big family.
People are able to live in harmony.

With our rich, ancient wisdom
You are our only hope, and faith,
And let my love save you.
My republic, my Tatarstan!

=== Original version ===
The original proposed lyrics of the anthem, titled "Tuğan yağım" (lit. 'My Native Land'), was written by Ramazan Baytimerov in the 1970s. The text was subsequently translated into Russian by Marsel Sabirov. During that time, Röstäm Yaxin was inspired to composed music that eventually became the national anthem. The Russian version, however, was not adopted.

==== Tatar original ====
Cyrillic script

Күпме юллар йөрдем, дөнья күрдем,
Назлы җилләр йөзем сыйпады.
𝄆 Сиңа кайткач гына, туган ягым,
Күкрәгемә шатлык сыймады. 𝄇

Тик бер генә көнгә аерылсам да
Ямансулап сине юксынам.
𝄆 Синнән башка миңа, туган ягым,
Бу дөньяда тормыш юк сыман. 𝄇

Тик бер генә көнгә аерылсам да
Ятим калган кебек буламын!
Тик син гөнә яшәү матурлыгы,
Гүзәллеге якты дөньяның! 𝄇

Latin script

Küpme yullar yördem, dönya kürdem,
Nazlı cillər yözem sıypadı.
𝄆 Siña qaytqaç ğına, tuğan jağım,
Kükrəgemə şatlıq sıymadı. 𝄇

Tik ber genə köngə ayırılsam da
Yamansulap sine yuqsınam.
𝄆 Sinnən başqa miña, tuğan yağım,
Bu dönyada tormış yuq sıman. 𝄇

Tik ber genə köngə ayırılsam da
Yətim qalğan kebek bulamın!
𝄆 Tik sin gönə yəşəw maturlığı,
Güzəllege yaqtı dönyanıñ! 𝄇

IPA transcription (Note: See Help:IPA/Tatar, Tatar alphabet § Cyrillic version and Tatar language § Phonology)

[kʉpˈmɘ juɫˈɫɑr jɵrˈdɘm | dɵnˈjɑ kʉrˈdɘm |]
[nʌzˈɫɤ ʑʲilˈlær jɵˈzɘm | ˌsɯɪ.pɑˈdɤ ‖]
𝄆 [sʲiŋˈɑ qʌjtˈqɑɕ ʁɤˈnɑ | tuˈʁɑn jʌˈʁɤm |]
[kʉkˌræ.gɘˈmæ ʃʌtˈɫɤq | ˌsɯɪ.mɑˈdɤ ‖] 𝄇

[tʲik bɘr gɘˈnæ kɵnˈgæ | ˌʌj.rɤɫˈsɑm dɑ |]
[jʌˌmʌn.suˈɫɑp sʲiˈnɘ | ˌjuq.sɤˈnɑm ‖]
𝄆 [sʲinˈnæn bʌʃˈqɑ mʲiŋˈɑ | tuˈʁɑn jʌˈʁɤm |]
[bu ˌdɵn.jɑˈdɑ torˈmɤʃ | juq sɤˈmɑn ‖] 𝄇

[tʲik bɘr gɘˈnæ kɵnˈgæ | ˌʌj.rɤɫˈsɑm dɑ |]
[jæˈtʲim qʌɫˈʁɑn kɘˈbɘk | ˌbu.ɫɑˈmɤn ‖]
𝄆 [tʲik sʲin gɵˈnæ jæˈʃæw | mʌˌtur.ɫɤˈʁɤ |]
[gʉˌzæl.lɘˈgɘ jʌqˈtɤ | ˌdɵn.jɑˈnɤŋ ‖] 𝄇

==== Russian translation ====
Cyrillic script

Сколько дорог я прошёл, весь мир обойдя,
Нежный ветер ласкал моё лицо любя,
𝄆 Но только придя к тебе Родная земля,
Грудь сжалась, место радости не найдя… 𝄇

В один день даже если будет разлука,
Грусть по тебе это сплошная мука,
𝄆 Без тебя, о Родная земля,
Нет жизни, без тебя — нет меня… 𝄇

В один день даже если будет разлука,
Я как будто словно сирота!
𝄆 Лишь ты мой смысл жизни,
Лишь ты яркий свет отчизны 𝄇

Latin script

Skolko dorog ya proşöl, ves mir oboydə,
Nejnıy veter laskal moyo litso lübə,
𝄆 No tolko pridə k tebe Rodnaya zemlə,
Grud sjalas, mesto radosti ne naydə… 𝄇

V odin den daje yesli budet razluka,
Grust po tebe eto sploşnaya muka,
𝄆 Bez tebə, o Rodnaya zemlə,
Net jizni, bez tebə – net menə… 𝄇

V odin den daje yesli budet razluka,
Ya kak budto slovno sirota!
𝄆 Liş tı moy smısl jizni,
Lış tı yarkiy svet otçiznı 𝄇

==== English translation ====
Of many roads I’ve traveled around the world,
Gentle winds caressed my face.
𝄆 But only with thee, my native land,
I am otherwise joyless… 𝄇

For just one day I am away,
I miss thee with all my sadness.
𝄆 Without thee, my land so dear,
The world is seemingly lifeless… 𝄇

For just one day I am away,
I feel like an orphan.
𝄆 Only thou art my meaning of this life;
The vivid ray of this world endless… 𝄇

Translation:

== See also ==
- Coat of arms of Tatarstan
- Flag of Tatarstan
