= Emblem of the Tatar Autonomous Soviet Socialist Republic =

- Armiger: Tatar Autonomous Soviet Socialist Republic
- Adopted: 25 June 1937
- Crest: Red star
- Supporters: Wheat and Cotton
- Motto: Барлык илләрнең пролетарийлары, берләшегез! (Tatar) Пролетарии всех стран, соединяйтесь! (Russian) "Workers of the world, unite!"

The national emblem of the Tatar Autonomous Soviet Socialist Republic was adopted in 1937 by the government of the Tatar Autonomous Soviet Socialist Republic. The emblem is identical to the emblem of the Russian Soviet Federative Socialist Republic.

== History ==
=== First version ===
After the formation of the Tatar ASSR, the first emblem of the Tatar ASSR was designed by the Tatar artist and sculptor Baqi Urmançe in 1920. The emblem had no official status.

=== Third version ===
==== First revision ====
On June 25, 1937, the Extraordinary XI Congress of Soviets of the Tatar ASSR adopted the first Constitution of the Tatar ASSR. The constitution came into force after being approved by the third session of the Supreme Soviet of the RSFSR during its first convocation on June 2, 1940. The constitution described the emblem of the Tatar ASSR, which was modeled after the emblem of the Russian SFSR. However, it included additional inscriptions in both Tatar and Russian languages "Tatar ASSR" and "Workers of the world, unite!"

The emblem itself was approved on October 4, 1937.

==== Second revision ====
May 5, 1939, the Presidium of the Supreme Council of the Tatar ASSR adopted a decree "On the transfer of the Tatar alphabet from the Latin alphabet to the Cyrillic letters", which was approved by the Law of the Tatar ASSR on August 17, 1939. The inscription of the emblem changed according to the decree.

==== Third revision ====
On May 31, 1978, the extraordinary 9th session of the Supreme Council of the Tatar ASSR adopted the new Constitution of the Tatar ASSR. The article 157 of the constitution added a red five-pointed star to the emblem.

The regulation on the arms of the Tatar ASSR was approved by the Decree of the Presidium of the Supreme Council of the Tatar ASSR on June 1, 1981.

== Gallery ==
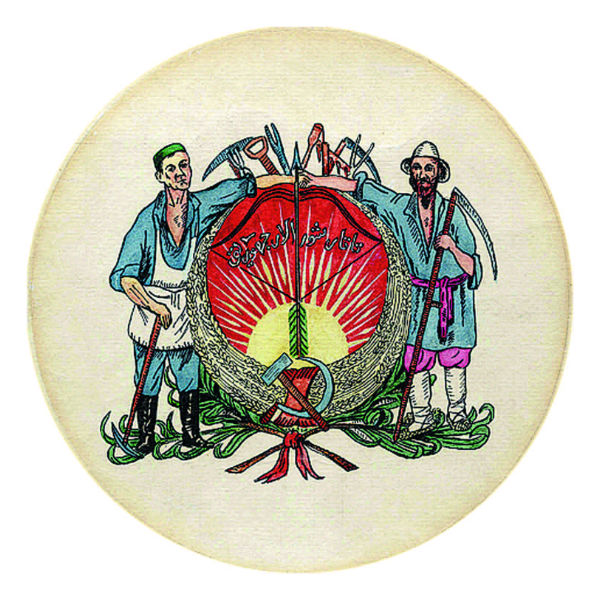
Unofficial emblem of the Tatar ASSR (1920–1926)

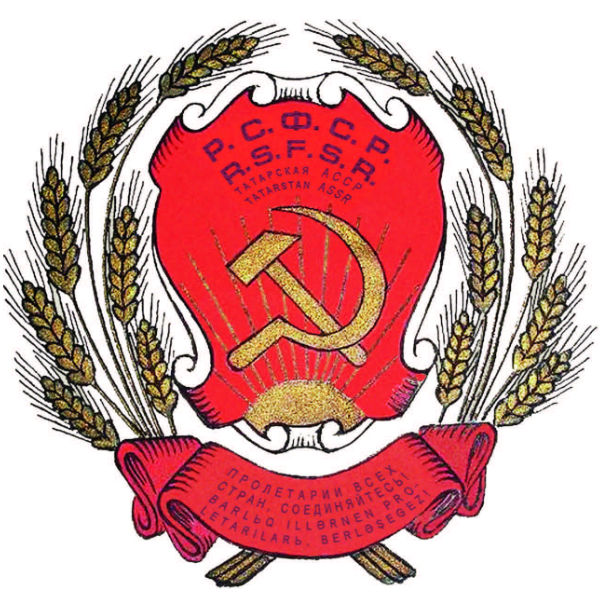
Emblem of the Tatar ASSR (1937–1978)

Emblem of the Tatar ASSR (1978–1992)

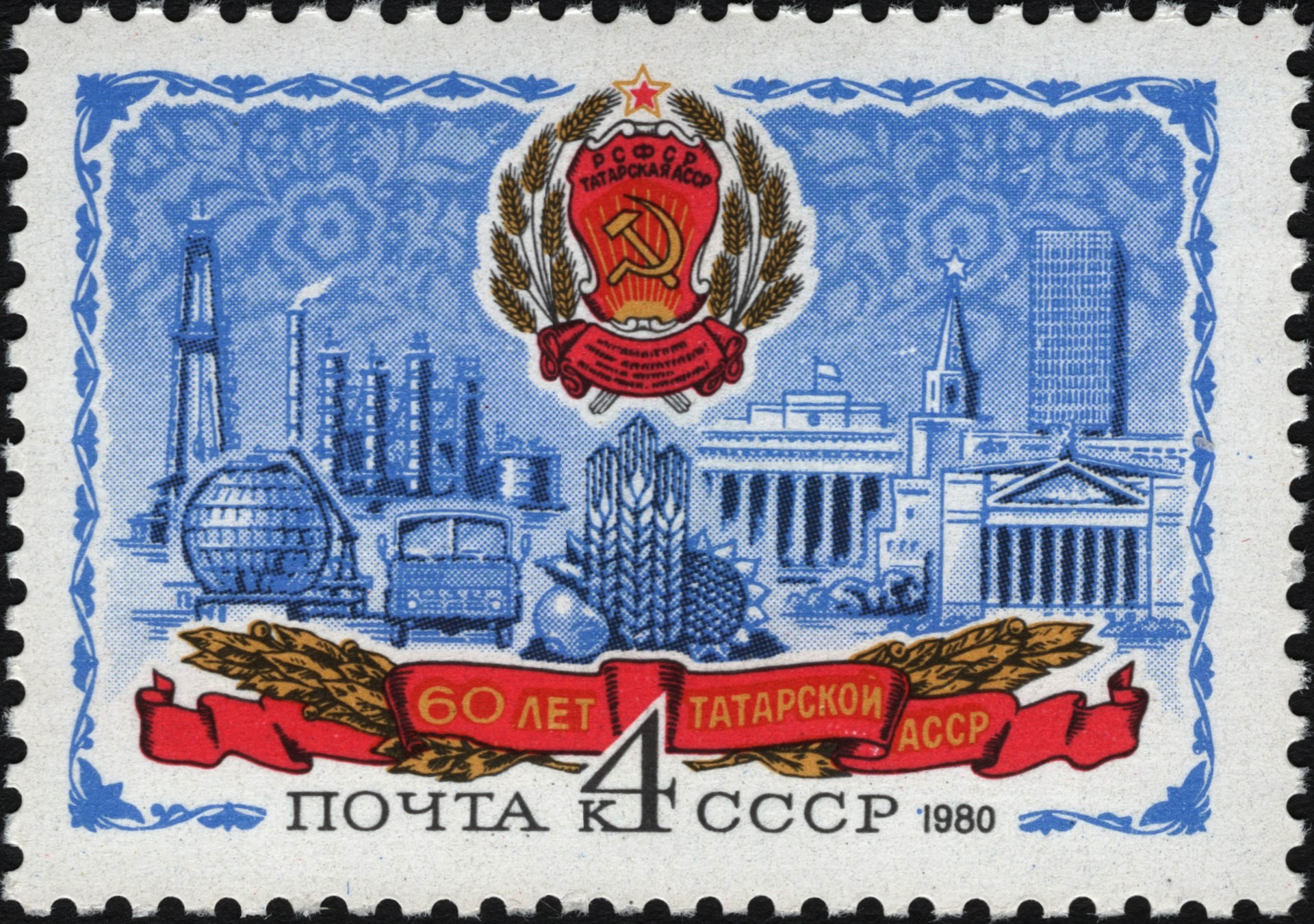
Stamp marking the 60th anniversary of the TASSR (1980)

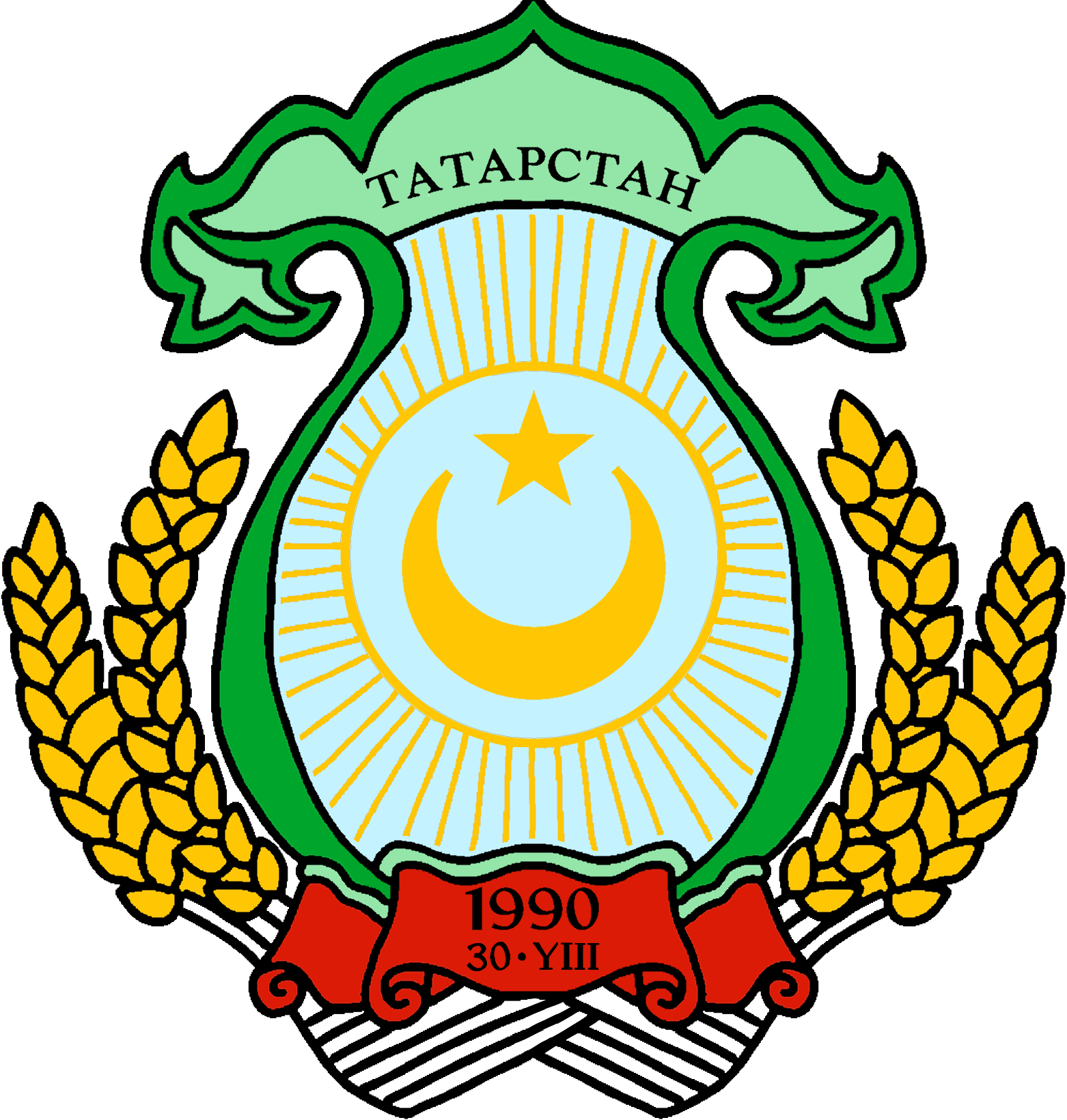
Proposed coat of arms of the Tatar SSR (1991)

== See also ==
- Flag of the Tatar Autonomous Soviet Socialist Republic
- Coat of arms of Tatarstan - Coat of arms of modern Tatarstan
- Emblem of the Russian Soviet Federative Socialist Republic
