= Old Tatar Quarter =

Coordinates: 55°46′41″N 49°06′54″E

The Old Tatar Quarter (tat.: Иске бистә, İske bistä) is a historical area in the southern part of the Vakhitovsky district in Kazan, the capital of Tatarstan, Russia. The quarter stretches from northwest to southeast and is located between Lake Nizhniy Kaban and the Bolaq channel in the east, the southern intracity railway tracks in the west, the Central Market in the north and Vakhit Square in the south. The quarter conventionally has three historical parts: the northern - business, the central - cultural and residential, the southern - industrial. The axial street for the quarter is Tukay Street. The northern and central parts of the quarter are separated by Tatarstan Street, built during the Soviet period. The center of the settlement is Yunusov Square.

For historical reasons, before 1917, Kazan had two distinct parts of urban development, reflecting the development of two main urban national cultures. The Russian part of Kazan (divided into an aristocratic part - in the area of Karl Marx Street, a merchant part - in the center, and a lost quarter with less representative houses in the area of Fedoseyevskaya Street) was located in the upper part of Kazan, on the territory of Baumansky, Vakhitovsky and Sovetsky districts. In the area of Lake Nizhny Kaban and behind the Bolaq channel, where loyal Kazan residents were resettled behind the posad wall in the 16th century after the conquest of the city by Ivan the Terrible, a unique ensemble of national Tatar architecture was formed in the 17th-18th centuries, where, without exaggeration, each house is associated with names outstanding for Tatar history and culture. To the southwest of this settlement there is also the New Tatar (Novo-Tatar) settlement - a place of settlement of the Tatar working and artisan population, as well as former and current industrial and transport enterprises, which has less architectural and cultural value.

== History ==
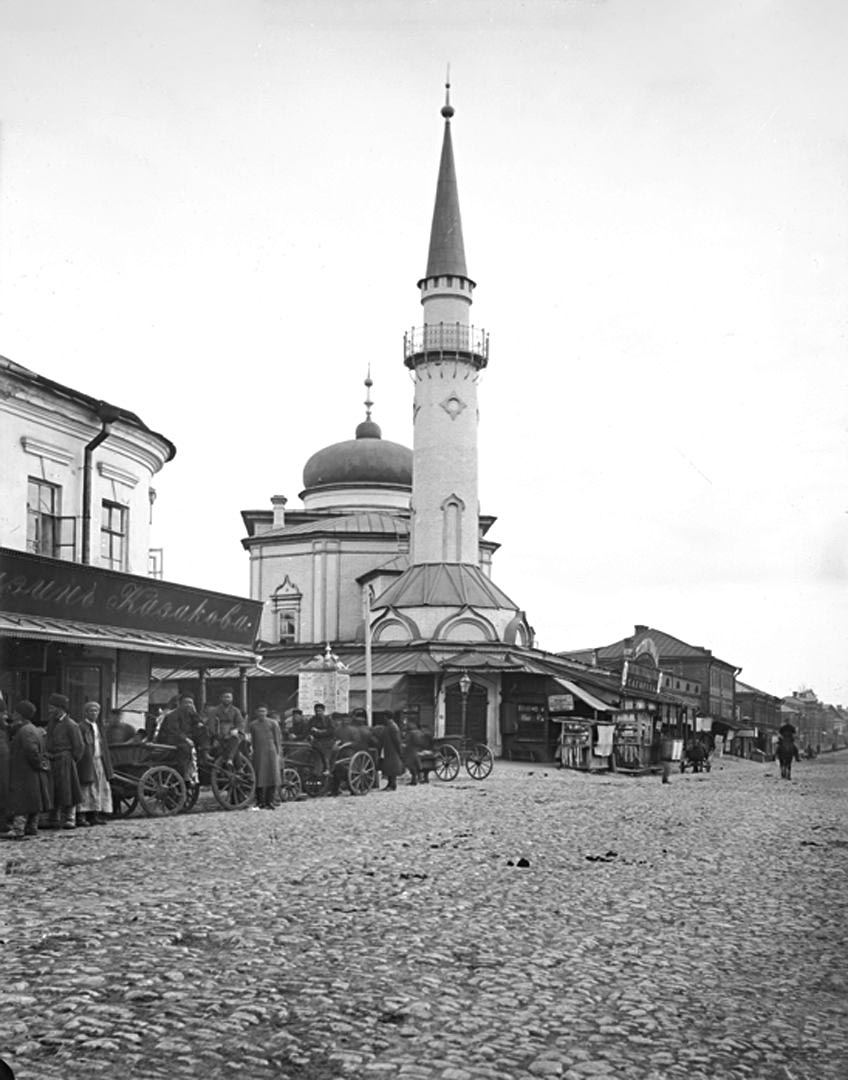
Nurulla Mosque in the XIX century

The core of the Old Tatar settlement is located beyond the Bulak channel, where even before the city was conquered by Ivan the Terrible there was the "Tsar's meadow" and the village of Kuraishi (later Kuraishieva Sloboda) with the stone Otuchevaya Mosque. The settlement's development and construction began particularly rapidly after Empress Catherine II's visit to Kazan in 1767, when she personally lifted all previous restrictions on building stone mosques and Tatar public buildings, as well as in connection with her historic decree of 1773 "On the tolerance of all religions". By the end of the 19th century, a large ensemble of the Old Tatar settlement had formed in the area of the streets Moskovskaya, Narimanov, Sary Sadykova, G. Kamala, Akhtyamova. The most valuable historical buildings are located in the area of Moskovskaya-Mardzhani Street to S. Sadykova Street (from east to west) and from G. Kamala Street to Akhtyamova Street (from north to south). The axial street for the entire settlement, Tukaya Street (Tikhvinskaya and Yekaterininskaya until 1917), was built up with mansions of Tatar industrialists, entrepreneurs and clergy. The center of the northern part of the settlement and its trading quarter, which is typical of all eastern cities, was the Peçən Bazaar and Nurulla Mosque in its center (Paris Commune Street and Tatarstan). Around the mosque were grouped hotels (Bulgar, Amur) and commercial buildings, merchant shops.

The central part of the settlement consists of the buildings on the left bank of Lake Kaban and the streets of K. Nasyri, G. Tukai, S. Sadykova, the core of this part is the intersection of G. Tukai and F. Karim streets, forming a small Yunusovskaya square, which was the social center of the settlement during the years of revolutions. The square was surrounded by the houses of Tatar merchants and manufacturers - B. Apanaev, V. Ibragimov, S. Bakhteev, M. Mustakimov, Alkinykh. The pearls of the southern part of the settlement are the Marjani Mosque, Burnaevskaya, Golubaya. Kayum Nasyri Street was originally called Zakharyevskaya. It received this name from the church of "Zakharia and Elizabeth" located at the end of the street, dismantled in 1925. In 1930, the street was renamed in honor of the Tatar scientist and encyclopedist Kayum Nasyri. In 2013, after restoration work, the street became a pedestrian street.

The southern part of the settlement housed the largest industrial enterprises of its time — the soap and chemical plant (now Nefis-cosmetics) and the Petzold brewery (now Krasny Vostok-Solodovpivo). In Soviet times, the Radiopribor, KMIZ, Mediinstrument, Aromat factory and other factories were added to them.
