= Bolaq =

Coordinates: 55°47′24.2″N 49°6′36.3″E

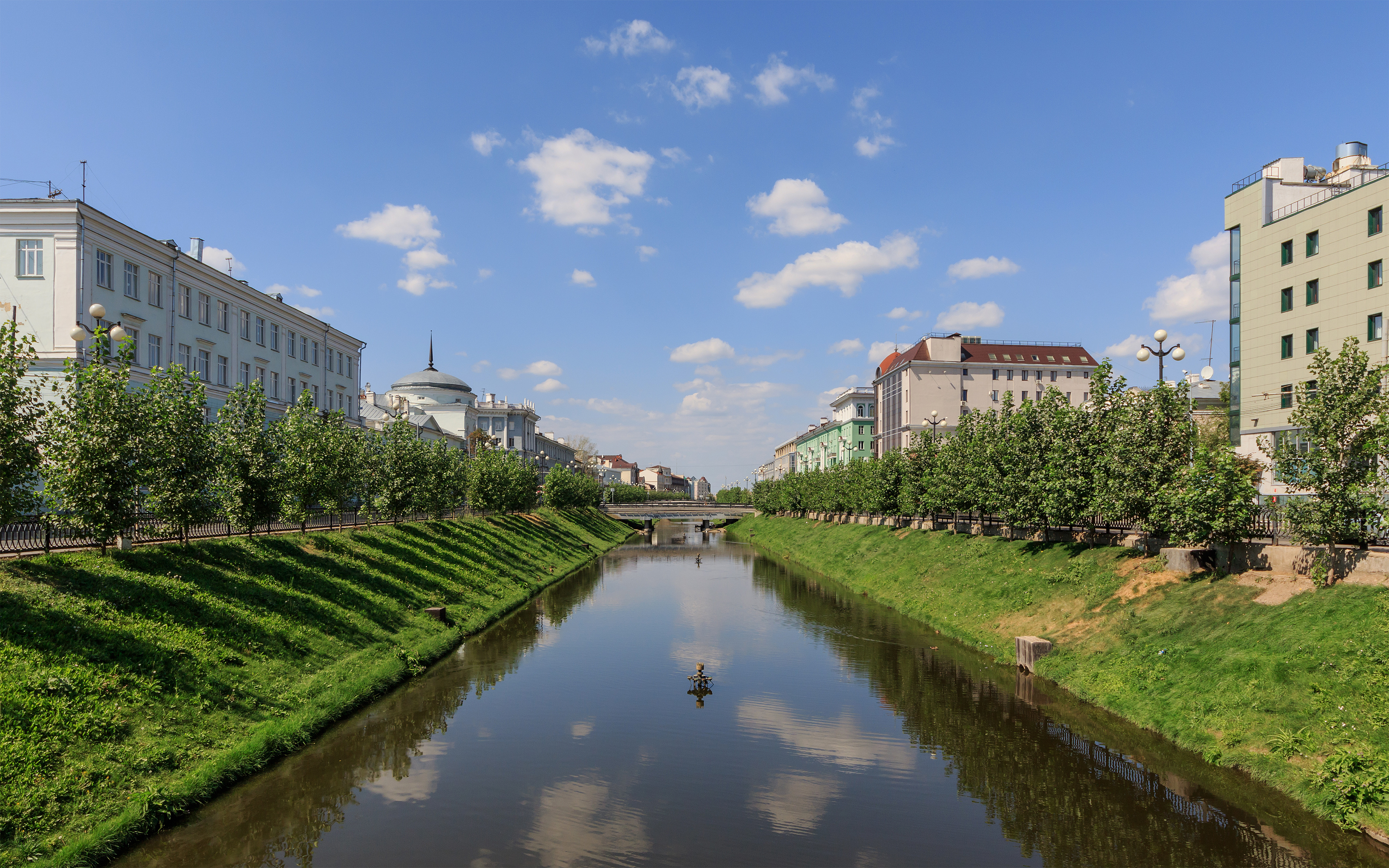
Bolaq from bridge at the crossing with Kamal Street

The Bolaq (Tatar: Болак; Russian: Булак) is a canal that once flowed from the northern part of Birge Kaban to Kazanka. Today it is an isolated channel in downtown Kazan. The modern length of Bolaq is 1,550 metres (5,090 ft), and the width is 24 metres (79 ft). As a street Bolaq, or, more correctly, Uñ yaq Bolaq/Pravobulachnaya and Sul yaq Bolaq/Levobulachnaya streets is a major arterial road in Central Kazan.

== Etymology ==
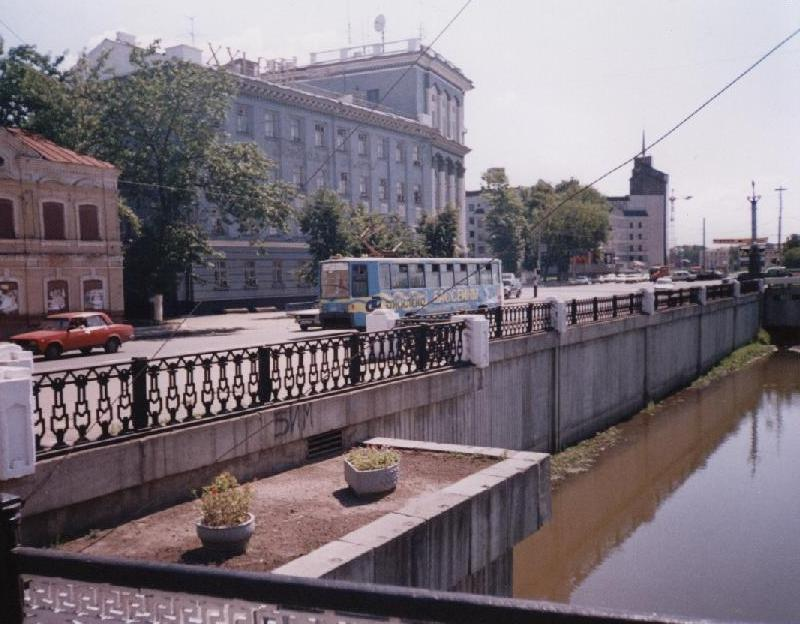
Bolaq embankment in 1990s

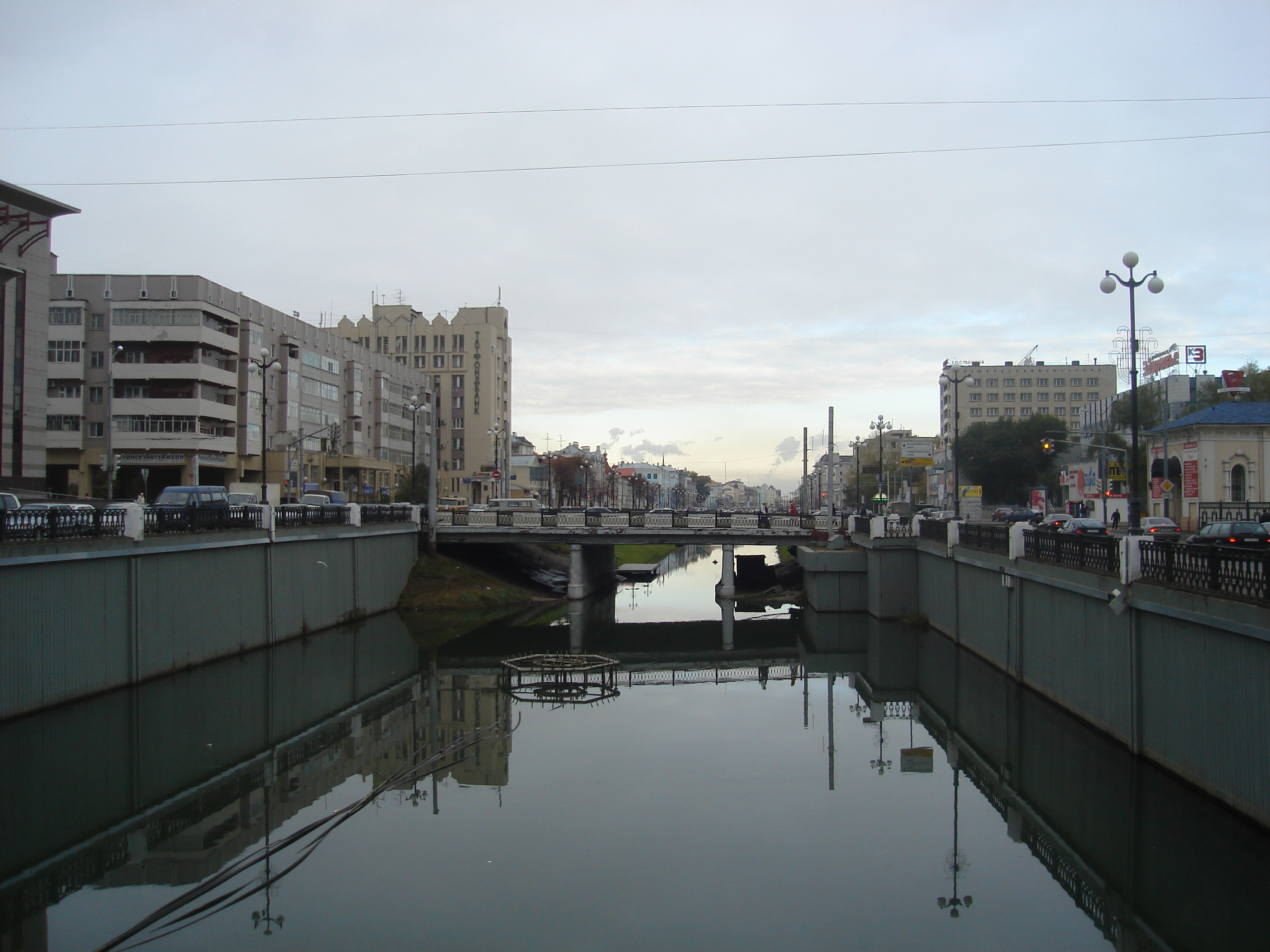
Bolaq from Pushkin Street, Kazan

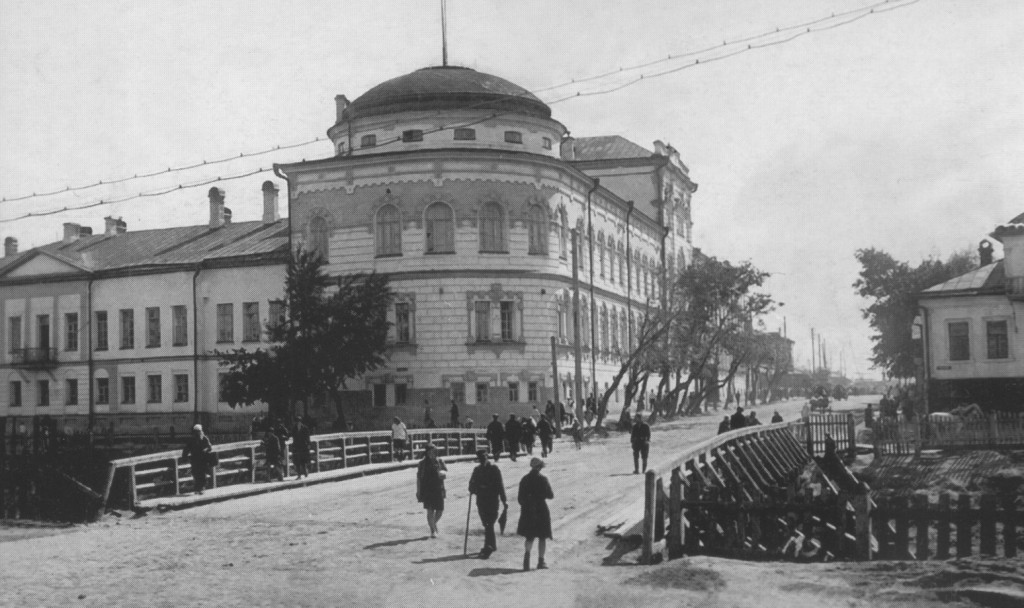
Bridge at Nacmi Street (1920s–1930s)

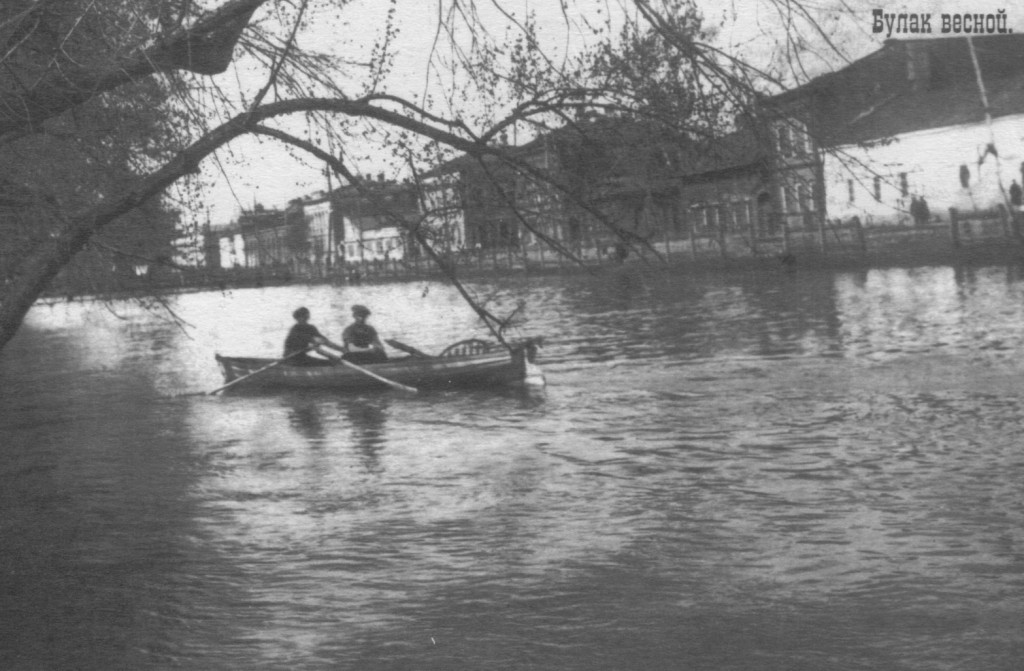
Bolaq at spring tide (1920s–1950s)

Bolaq or Bulak, the Russian spelling, refers also for two streets, that are the embankments of the channel: Left Bolaq (Sul yaq Bolaq/Levobulachnaya; Cyrillic:Сул Болак/Левобулачная) and Right Bolaq (Uñ yaq Bolaq/Pravobulachnaya; Cyrillic:Уң Болак/Правобулачная). The origin of the word bolaq is disputed. Some claim that this comes from balaq, i.e. "arm". Another state that "bolaq" is an Old Tatar/Bulgar for "brook" and could be found in several modern hydronyms of Tatarstan.

== Natural history ==
Bolaq, as a part of Qaban lake system once was a part of Volga's riverbed, but then Volga came some kilometers to the west. By the results of geological and hydrological researches nearby thousand years ago Bolaq was a natural river, 60 metres (200 ft) wide and 6.5 metres (21 ft) deep. Bolaq had a delta of many distributaries. With time Bolaq became shallow. The number of branches in delta decreased and for several recent centuries there were only two: Zur (Big) Bolaq and Çerek (Foul) Bolaq.

In the 15th century Bolaq's valley was covered with brake. A water of Bolaq was used for drink and dough that time. The shore protection of Bolaq was firstly realized in the Khanate's epoch. Cheremis workers set logs to the bottom of natural river. That period Bolaq was navigable channel, sluice in the mouth kept the level of Bolaq stable. The berths of Bolaq supplied for the Taşayaq trade fair. During the storm of Kazan Kazan Chronicle reported that Bolaq was already swamped and served only as defence zone. In the 19th century as a result of the city's economical development Bolaq was reconstructed, embankments were built on apartments and depots, first wooden bridges were built. The first arched stone bridge was built in 1907 by the project of Lev Kazimirovich Khrshchonovich.

In the 1940s tramway was installed at the embankment and in one site it was preserved until the 2000s. In the 1940s–1950s five bridges of reinforced concrete were built, the embankment was covered with iron grate, slopes were matted by the project of Ü.G. Alparov and Ye.Yu. Brudny. With the infill of Kuybyshev Reservoir and the constructing of check dams the lower stream of Bolaq was covered up with earth and divided from Kazanka in 1955–56. In 1967 the subterranean channel, 546 metres (1,791 ft) long, was constructed to connect Bolaq and Volga. As natural the level of Bolaq and Qaban is much lower than that of Kuybyshev Reservoir, pumps throw out the effluent water. The last reconstruction by the project of Y. V. Grebnyov was started in 1986. It was proposed to make embankment vertical. But socially active people protested, as it was in dissonance with Kazan traditional architecture. Only the ends of canal still have vertical embankment, the major part is still has matted slopes. The reconstruction was finalized in 1993. Fountains were set all over Bolaq. In the 1980s Bolaq was considered to be a dead reservoir, as the poisoned by chemicals plants water of Qaban penetrated the channel. Today the main pollution source is traffic of cars. Nevertheless, some fishes and wild ducks live in channel.

== Human history ==
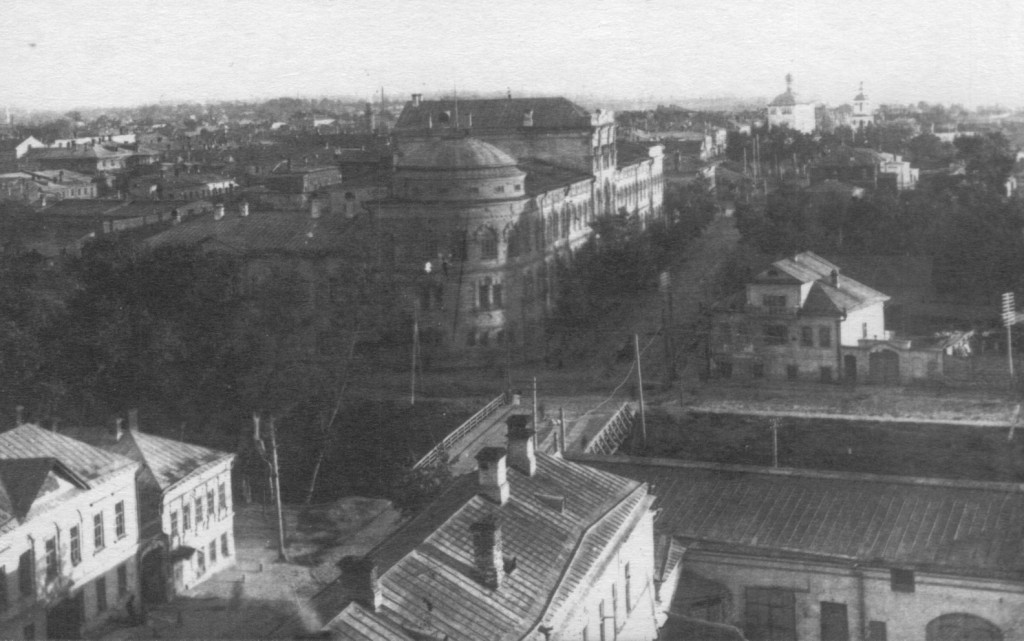
Transbolaqia. A view from Voznesensky Church (was not preserved) in 1910s–1930s

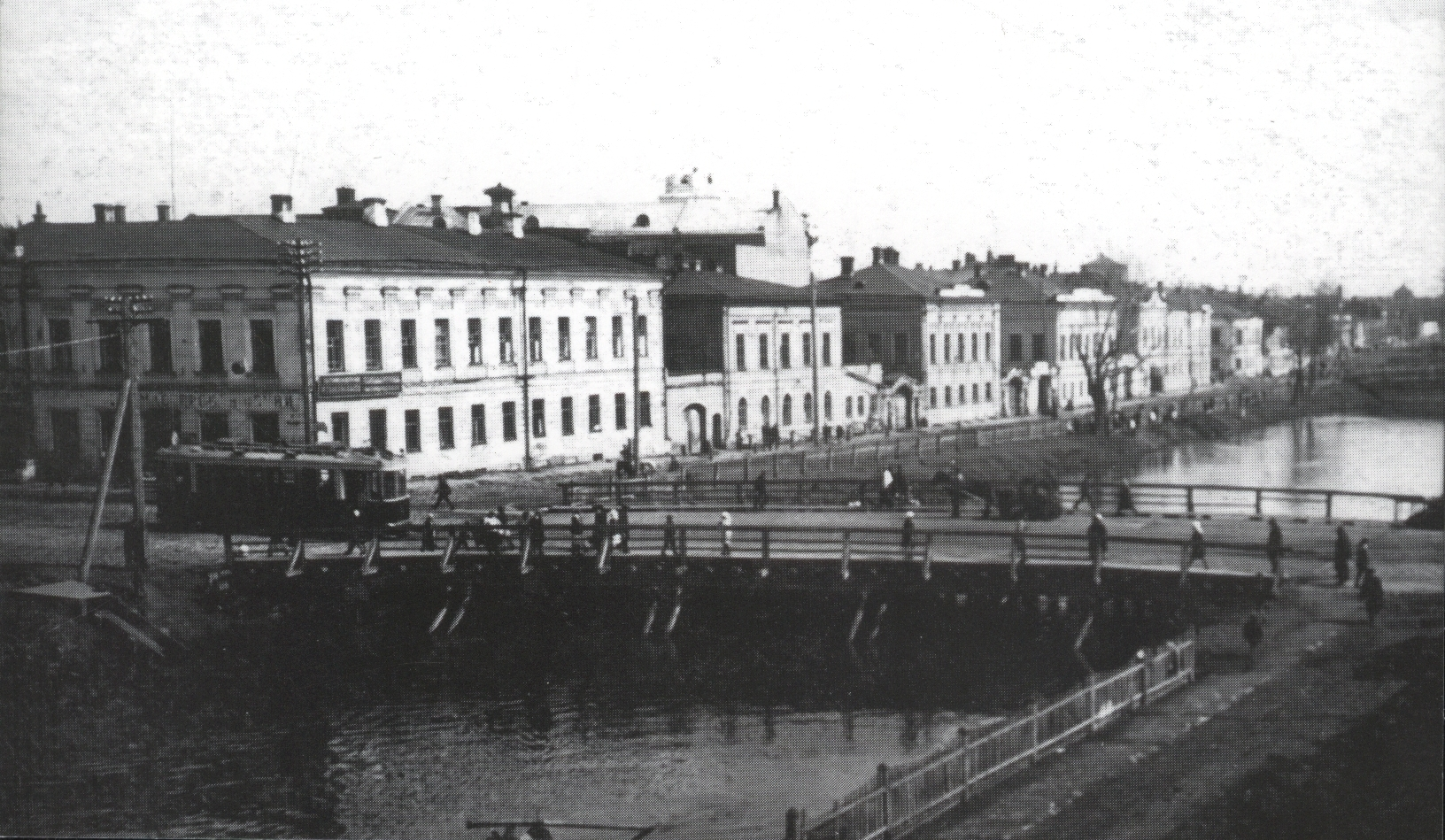
Bolaq in the beginning of the 20th century (Chernyshevsky Street)

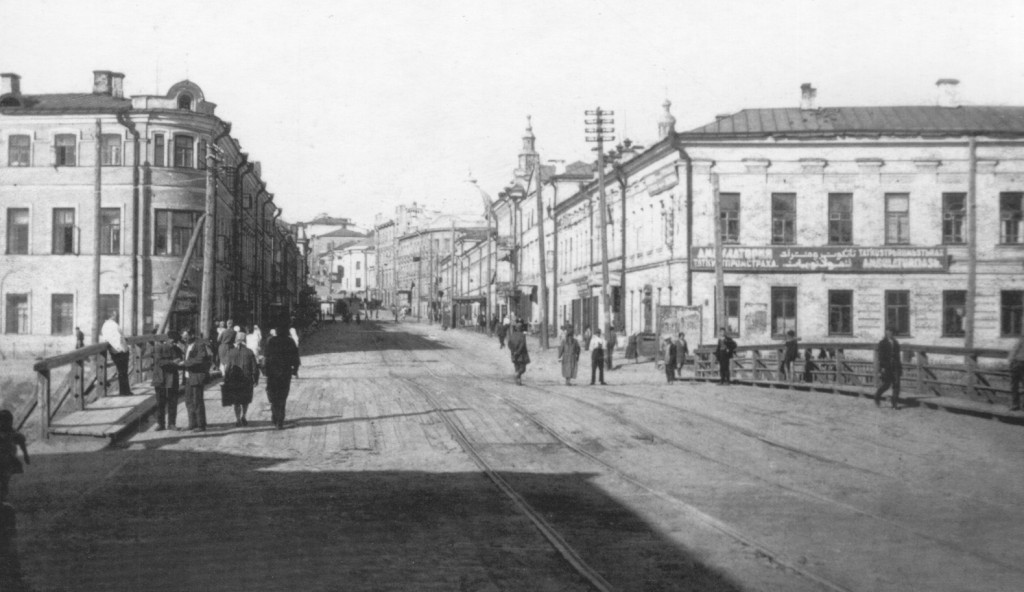
Another view of this bridge, 1910s–1940s

The earliest human history of the area is unclear, but probably, Bolaq played major role in fishing and transporting, as well as defense. By legends, a water of Bolaq was used for drink and dough in the 15th century. With the growth of Kazan channel was polluted, but it became a navigable channel. Some report about mills at the dykes in Bolaq's mouth. If there any grain of truth in legends, Khan's court sailed to summer residence on the Arğı Qaban by Qaban and Bolaq. A district, named Köräyeş settlement of first half of the 16th century, was situated at the bank of Bolaq. The fair and bath-houses were situated at the channel.

After the fall of Kazan in 1552 Tatars had right to settle only beyond the Bolaq, as a city themselves was settled by Russian personnel. So, this channel became a natural ethnic border between Tatars and Russians in Kazan until any ethnic borders finally crashed in the 20th century, after the revolution of 1917 and ban of religion. But even in 19th century Russian settled beyond the Bolaq, as well as Tatars settled in the mainly Russian part of the city. The fair of Bolaq was preserved until the 19th century. By Aksakov, the traditional fair on the Bolaq was preserved, but unlike the Taşayaq it had only local significance. The distinctive of this fair were boats that penetrated to the Central Kazan by spring tide. The majority of tradesmen were local peasants and they trade was straight from boats.

In 1918 national-democratic movement tried to establish Idel-Ural State, but Bolsheviks arrested chairmen of the congress, proclaimed those republic. In response, congress proclaimed Transbolaqia Republic (Bolaq artı Respublikası/Забулачная республика), i.e. the rule of the congress over Tatar part of the city. After the confrontation with Bolshevik and mass Bolshevik recruiting of Tatars Transbolaqia signed peace with Bolsheviks and later declined. Later Bolaq saw industrialization of the 1930s and deindustrialization of the 1990s, increase of cars in the 2000s, that was reflected on channel's ecology.

== Historical hydrology ==
Although modern Bolaq has only two connections to other reservoirs, both subterranean, it once had a complex hydrology. Bolaq had a tributary, a brook that had flowed from a former lake in the modern Paris Commune public garden. In the course of year, Bolaq flowed from Qaban to Kazanka. During Kazanka's spring tide, that followed Qaban's spring tide, Bolaq flowed from Kazanka to Qaban. Then flow course normalized. Ten days later, during Volga's spring tide, Bolaq flowed from Kazanka, Volga's tributary to Qaban again. At the south Qaban also became connected with Volga. At the winter's end, Bolaq waters had 45 metres (148 ft) above sea level, at Volga spring tide 50 to 53 metres (164 to 174 ft) and even 56 metres (184 ft). In summer the normal level was 49.5 metres (162 ft). As the result of this changing of the course, Bolaq's bottom had little silt. Since the 1950s Bolaq silts rapidly.

== 30 August ==
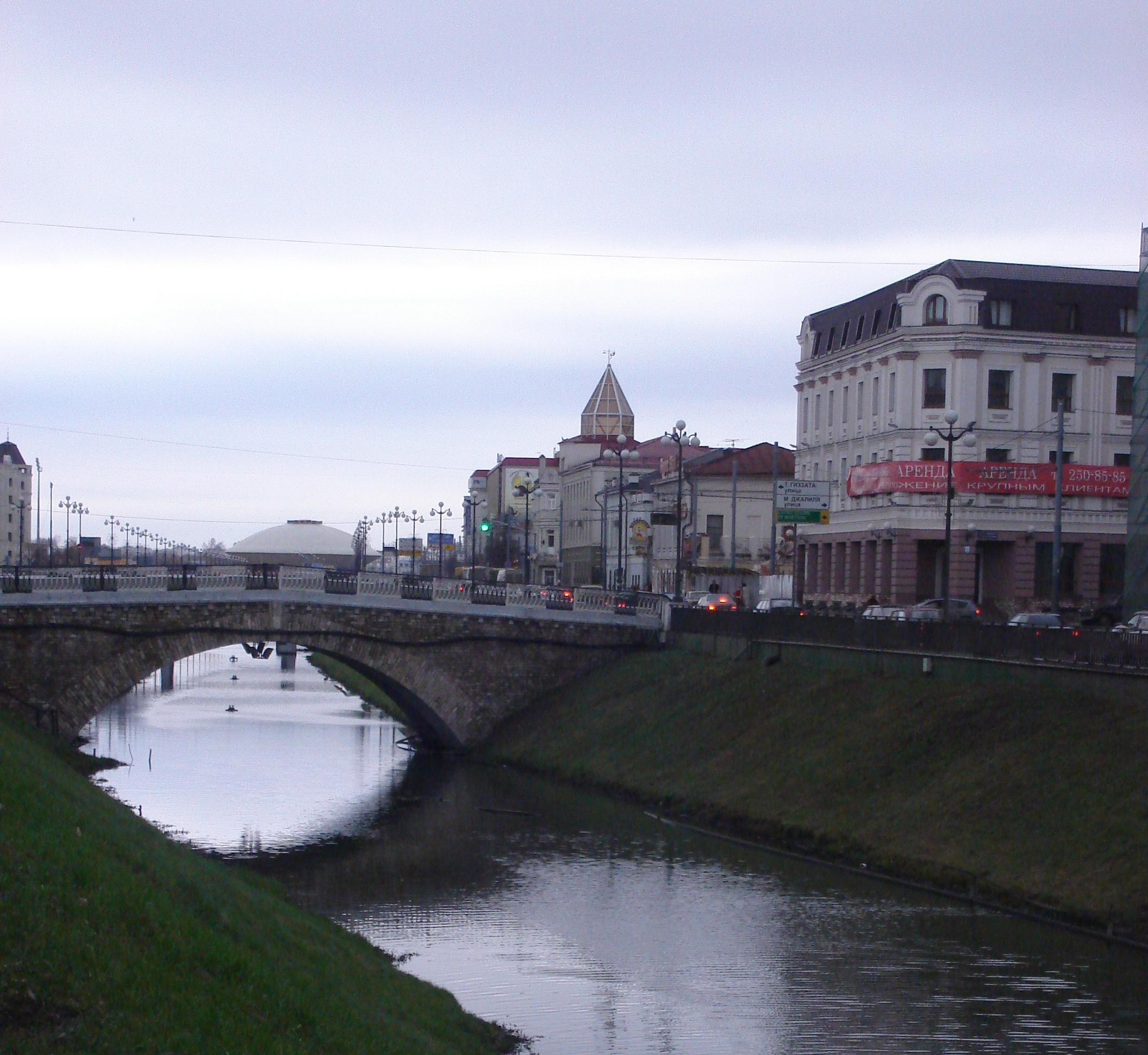
The lower stream of Bolaq, the first stone bridge

For 364 days Bolaq is a major arterial road, but on 30 August, the Republic Day in Tatarstan and City Day in Kazan the embankments of the channel became pedestrian area. Embankments and bridges are usually decorated with flags, balloons and posters of the coat of arms of Tatarstan, and many booths and open-air cafés are installed here. Many contests and karaoke entertain crowds of people.

== Photos ==
- Evening Bolaq
