= Pushkin Street, Kazan =

Street in Kazan, Russia

Coordinates: 55°47′06″N 49°07′08″E

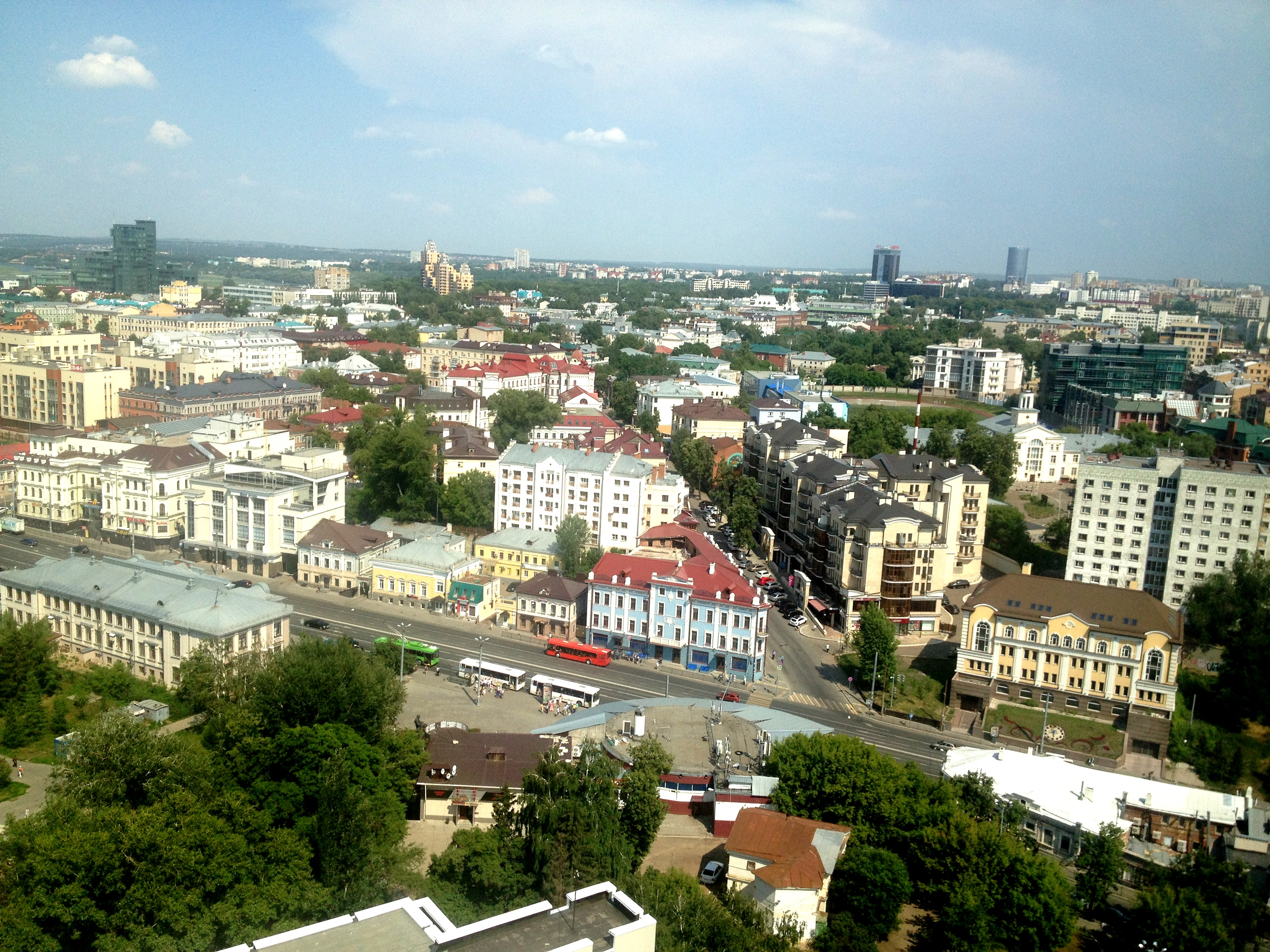
Pushkin Street

Pushkin Street (Russian: улица Пушкина; Tatar: Пушкин урамы, romanized: Puşkin uramı) is the main street of Kazan, the capital of the Republic of Tatarstan, Russia. The street runs from the Kaban Lakes in the southwest to the Kazanka River in the north. The street is one of the busiest in Kazan and is a major shopping area.

The street is named after the Russian poet Alexander Pushkin. The street's name is one of the oldest and dates back to 19th century.

== See also ==
- List of shopping streets and districts by city
