= Thousandth Anniversary of Islam Mosque =

Mosque in Kazan, Tatarstan, Russia

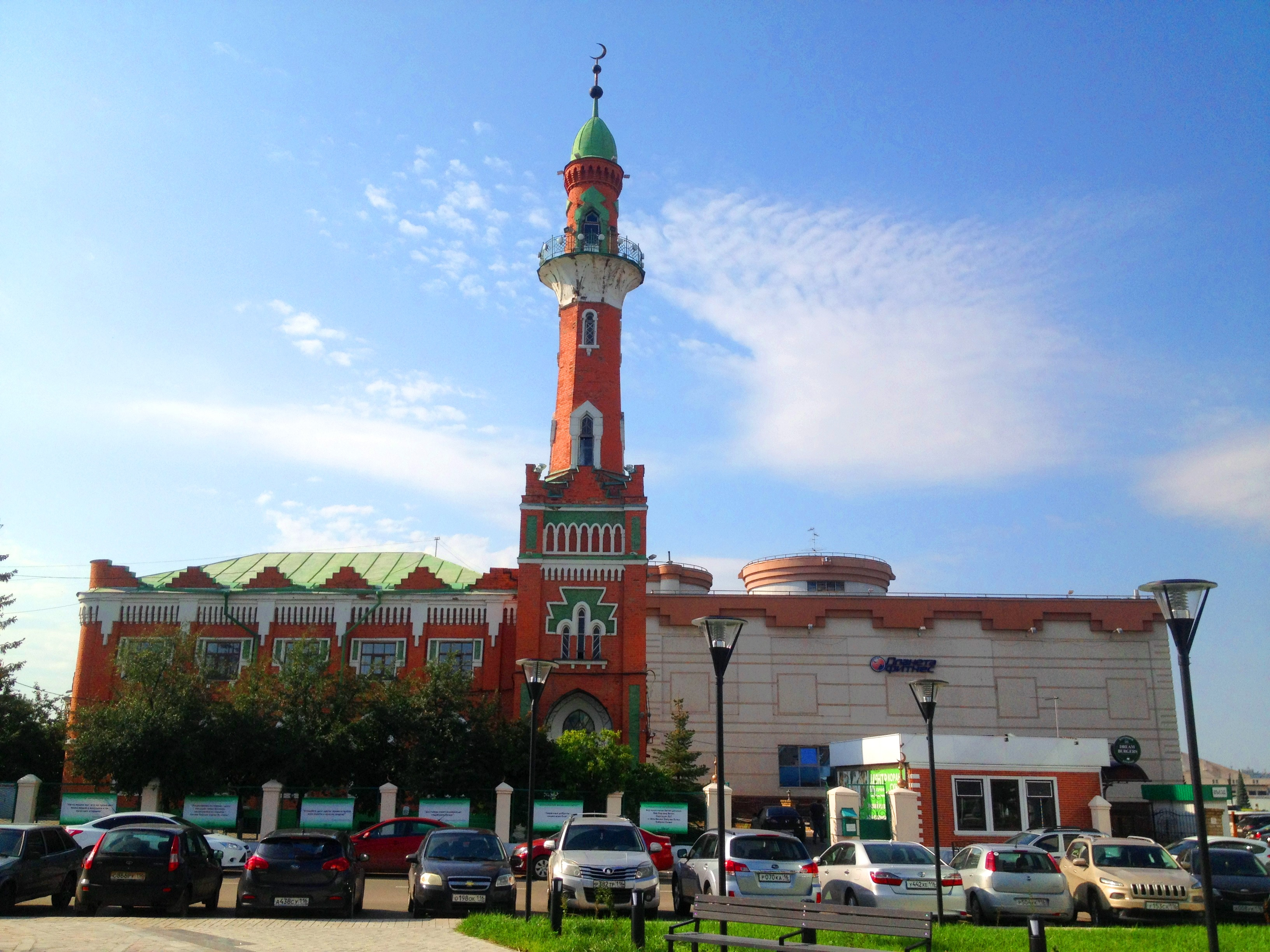

Religion
- Affiliation: Islam
- District: Tatarstan
- Status: Active

Location
- Location: Kazan, Russia
- Interactive map of Thousandth Anniversary of Islam Mosque
- Coordinates: 55°46′38″N 49°07′41″E

Architecture
- Architect: Pechnikov
- Type: Mosque
- Completed: 1926
- Minaret: 1

The Thousandth Anniversary of Islam Mosque or The Anniversary Mosque (Russian: Мечеть 1000-летия принятия Ислама, Мечеть Юбилейная – Mecheť 1000-letiya prinyatiya Islama, Mecheť Yubileynaya) was built in Kazan, Tatarstan, Russia to commemorate the thousandth anniversary of the conversion of the Volga Bulgars in to Islam in 922. The alternative name of the mosque, and the most commonly used name, is The Mosque Across the Kaban (Russian: Закабанная мечеть, Zakabannaya mecheť; Tatar: Кабан арты мәчете, Qaban artı mäçete, قبان آرتی مسجدی), because most of Kazan's mosques are situated on the other side of the Qaban, where the Tatar community was traditionally located before the October Revolution. The part where the mosque was situated was inhabited predominantly by the Russian community.

== History ==
Based on a design by Pechnikov from 1914, the mosque was built from 1924 to 1926 with private donations by Muslims. It was the only mosque built in the region during the Soviet period. It was closed in the 1930s as part of the Soviet Unions persecution of Muslims and was only reopened and used by Muslims in 1991.

== See also ==
- Islam in Tatarstan
- Islam in Russia
- List of mosques in Russia
- List of mosques in Europe
