= Flag of the Tatar Autonomous Soviet Socialist Republic =

Flags of the 1920-1990 Russian administrative division

Tatar Autonomous Soviet Socialist Republic
- Flag used from 1981 to 1991
- Use: Civil and state flag
- Proportion: 1:2
- Adopted: 1920
- Designed By: Unknown

The flag of the Tatar Autonomous Soviet Socialist Republic was adopted in 1920 and changed several times until 1991 when it ceased being used after the collapse of the Tatar ASSR. The flag's design used a similar layout to the Russian SFSR. It featured a light blue stripe to the left and a red background with a hammer and sickle located on the top left along with the words Tatar ASSR in Russian.

== Gallery ==
1926-1937

1937-1939

1939-1954

1954-1981

1981-1991

== See also ==
- Emblem of the Tatar Autonomous Soviet Socialist Republic
- Flag of Tatarstan
- Flag of the Russian Soviet Federative Socialist Republic
