= Flag of Tatarstan =

Tatarstan
- Proportion: 1:2
- Adopted: 29 November 1991
- Design: Red and green divided by a white fimbriation.
- Designed by: Tawil Xaciäxmätov

The state flag of Tatarstan (Tatar: Татарстан байрагы, romanized: Tatarstan bayrağı), a republic of Russia, was introduced in 1991.

== Design ==
The national flag of the Republic of Tatarstan consists of a rectangular panel with horizontal stripes of green, white and red. The white stripe is 1/15 of the flag's width and is located between equal-width stripes of green and red. The green stripe is at the top. The ratio of the flag's width to its length is 1:2."

According to official explanation;

- Red band symbolizes fight for happiness, bravery and courage
- White band symbolizes peace, concord and honest future
- Green band symbolizes hope, freedom and wealth.

| Colors | Green | Red |
|---|---|---|
| CMYK | 100, 0, 100, 0 | 0, 100, 100, 0 |
| Pantone | 354 °C | 179C |
| RGB | 97 174 86 | 193 51 35 |
| HEX | #61AE56 | #C13323 |

== History ==
The Supreme Council of the Tatar Soviet Socialist Republic adopted the flag on 29 November 1991 in its present form. It was designed by T.G. Khaziakhmetov (Tawil Xaciəxmətov).

The Tatar Encyclopedia states: "The flag is a state symbol that expresses the sovereignty of the Republic of Tatarstan, the identity and traditions of the people of Tatarstan."

Tatar nationalists such as the All-Tatar Public Center use a different flag, divided diagonally by red and green and containing a white star and crescent in the center.

=== Historical flags ===
Golden Horde

Khanate of Kazan

Idel-Ural State (1918)

Tatar ASSR (1926–1937)

Tatar ASSR (1937–1939)

Tatar ASSR (1939–1954)

Tatar ASSR (1954–1978)

Tatar ASSR (1978–1991)

=== Proposed flags ===
Flag of Tatar nationalists

Flag proposed by a special commission in 1991

== See also ==
- Coat of arms of Tatarstan
- Flag of the Tatar Autonomous Soviet Socialist Republic
