= Lev Khrshchonovich =

Russian architect (1838–1907)

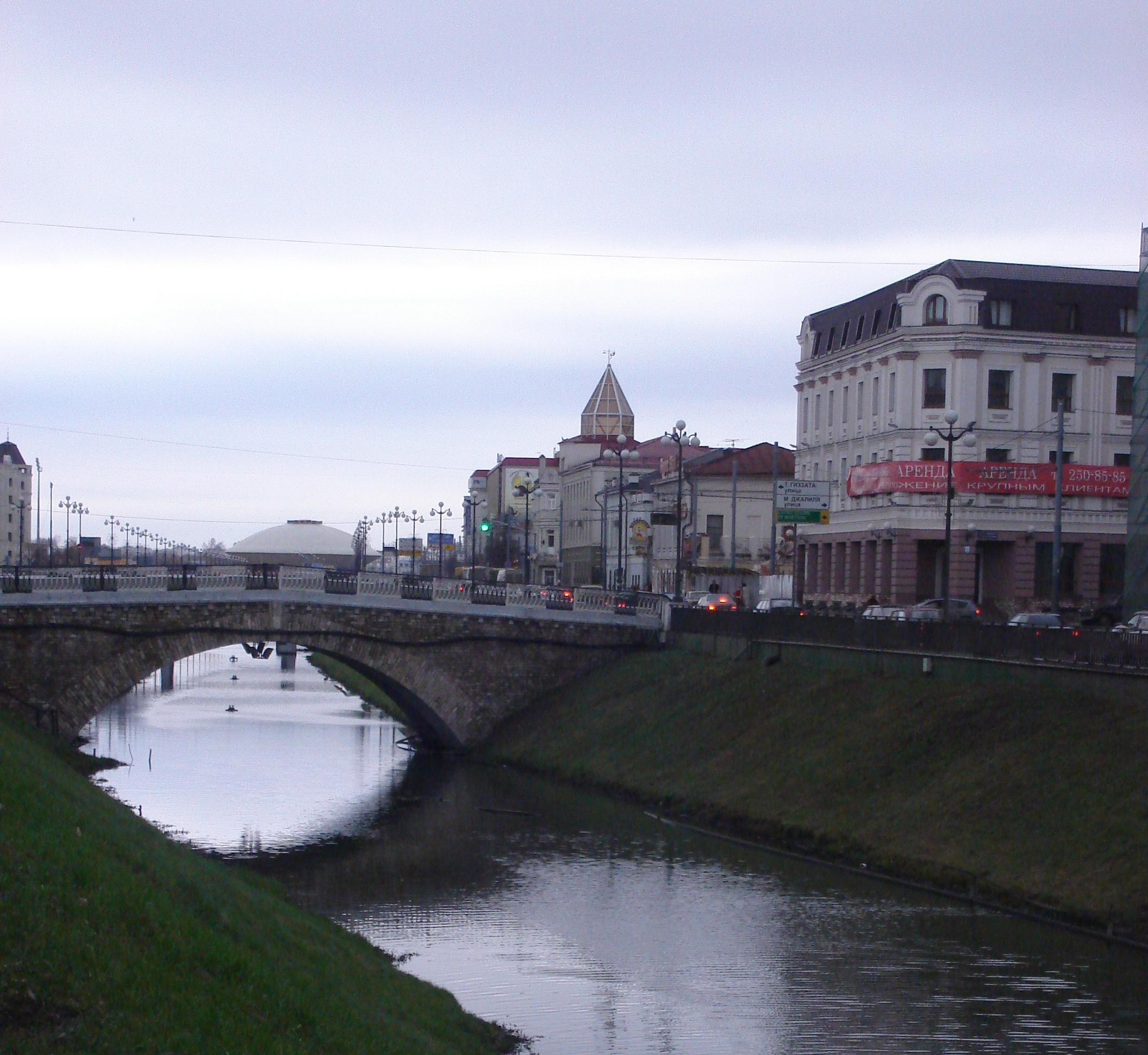
The bridge over Bolaq by Lev Khrshchonovich (1907)

Lev Kazimirovich Khrshchonovich (Russian: Лев Казими́рович Хрщоно́вич, 1838-1907), last name also spelled Chrśonowicz, Chrszczonowicz, Hrszczonowicz, Hrśonowicz, and Xrşçonoviç, was the chief architect of Kazan in the late 19th century and the early 20th century.

He was a son of Minsk architect Kazimierz Chrśonowicz, an ethnic Pole. Khrshchonovich graduated from the Saint Petersburg Architect School in 1859 and was sent to Kazan. In 1874–1882, he was the chief architect of the Kazan Governorate, and in 1883–1907 he held the post of the chief engineer of the governorate.

Khrshchonovich designed the Lutheran Church (1870s), the Alafuzov Theatre (1900), the first stone bridge over Bolaq (1907), and he managed the reconstruction of the Roman-Catholic Church (1907). Khrshchonovich was a follower of eclecticism.

He was married to Maria and had a son named Leonid, who also became an engineer.
