= Röstäm Yaxin =

Soviet Tatar composer (1921–1993)

- Рөстәм Яхин; Рустем Яхин
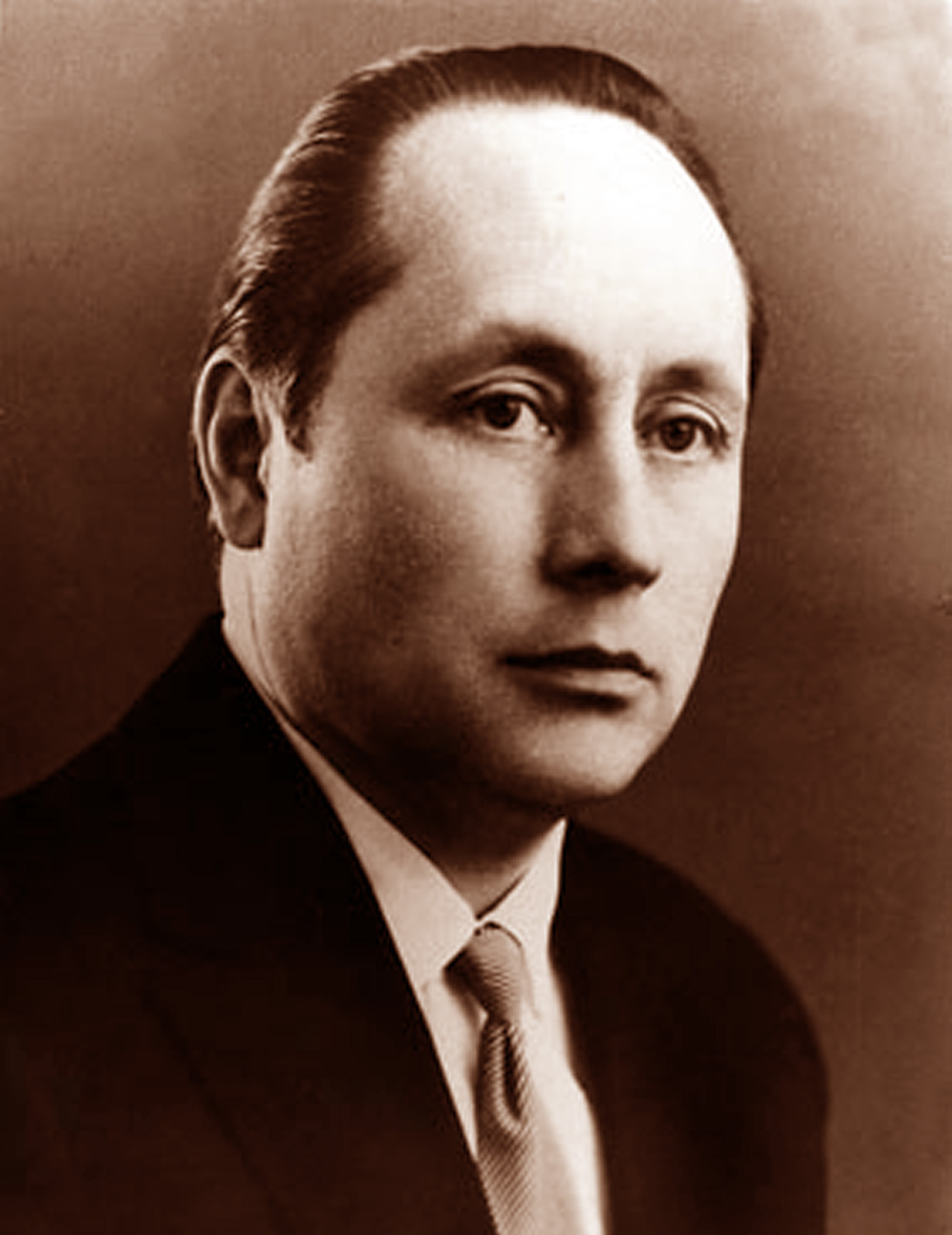
- Yaxin in the 1970-1980s
- Born: 16 August 1921; Kazan, TASSR, RSFSR, Soviet Union
- Died: 23 November 1993 (aged 72); Kazan, Tatarstan, Russia

Röstäm Möxämmätxaci ulı Yaxin (Note: Tatar: Рөстәм Мөхәммәтхаҗи улы Яхин, IPA: [rɵ̆sˈtæm mɵ̆xæmˌmætxæˈʑɪ]; Russian: Рустем Мухаметхазеевич Яхин, romanized: Rustém Mukhametkhazéyevich Yákhin) (16 August 1921 – 23 November 1993) was a Tatar composer and pianist, People's Artist of the USSR (1986). Author of more than 300 songs and romances, including the State Anthem of the Republic of Tatarstan. Röstəm Yaxin was a laureate of the Ğabdulla Tuqay Tatar ASSR State Prize in 1959.

== Notable works ==
His notable works besides the State Anthem of the Republic of Tatarstan include:

- "Love Song" (Note: Tatar: Мәхәббәт җыры, romanized: Mäxäbbät cırı; Russian: Песнь любви, romanized: Pesnj ljubvi)
- "I Believe" (Note: Tatar: Ышанам, romanized: Işanam; Russian: Верю, romanized: Verju)
- "Our Mothers" (Note: Tatar: Безнең әниләр, romanized: Bezneñ änilär; Russian: Наши матери, romanized: Naši materi)
- "White Sail" (Note: Tatar: Ак җилкән, romanized: Aq cilkän; Russian: Белый парус, romanized: Belyj narus)
- "Waves" (Note: Tatar: Дулкыннар, romanized: Dulqınnar; Russian: Волны, romanized: Volny)
- "Don't Fly Away, Nightingale" (Note: Tatar: Китмә, сандугач, romanized: Kitmä, sanduğaç; Russian: Не улетай, соловей, romanized: Ne uletaj, solovej)
- "I'll Enter the Forest" (Note: Tatar: Керим әле урманнарга, romanized: Kerim äle urmannarğa; Russian: Войду я в лес, romanized: Vojdu ja v les)
- "Spring's in My Soul" (Note: Tatar: Күңелемдә яз, romanized: Küñelemdä yaz; Russian: В душе весна, romanized: V duše vesna)

== Personal life ==
He was married to Halima Zakirovna Tazetdinova (1923–2004). The couple had no children.

== Legacy ==
In 2025, a children's art school opened in the Vysokogorsky railway station settlement was named after him (named the Röstäm Yaxin Children's Art School).

In September 2025, the Röstäm Yaxin Art School was opened in the village of Usad, Vysokogorsky District.

== Awards ==
- Order of the Red Banner of Labour
- Order of the Badge of Honour
- Medal "Veteran of Labour"
- Medal "For the Victory over Germany in the Great Patriotic War 1941–1945"
- Medal "For the Defence of Moscow"
- Jubilee Medal "In Commemoration of the 100th Anniversary since the Birth of Vladimir Il'ich Lenin"
- Jubilee Medal "70 Years of the Armed Forces of the USSR"
- People's Artist of the USSR
- People's Artist of the RSFSR
- Honoured Artist of the RSFSR
