= Kaban Lakes =

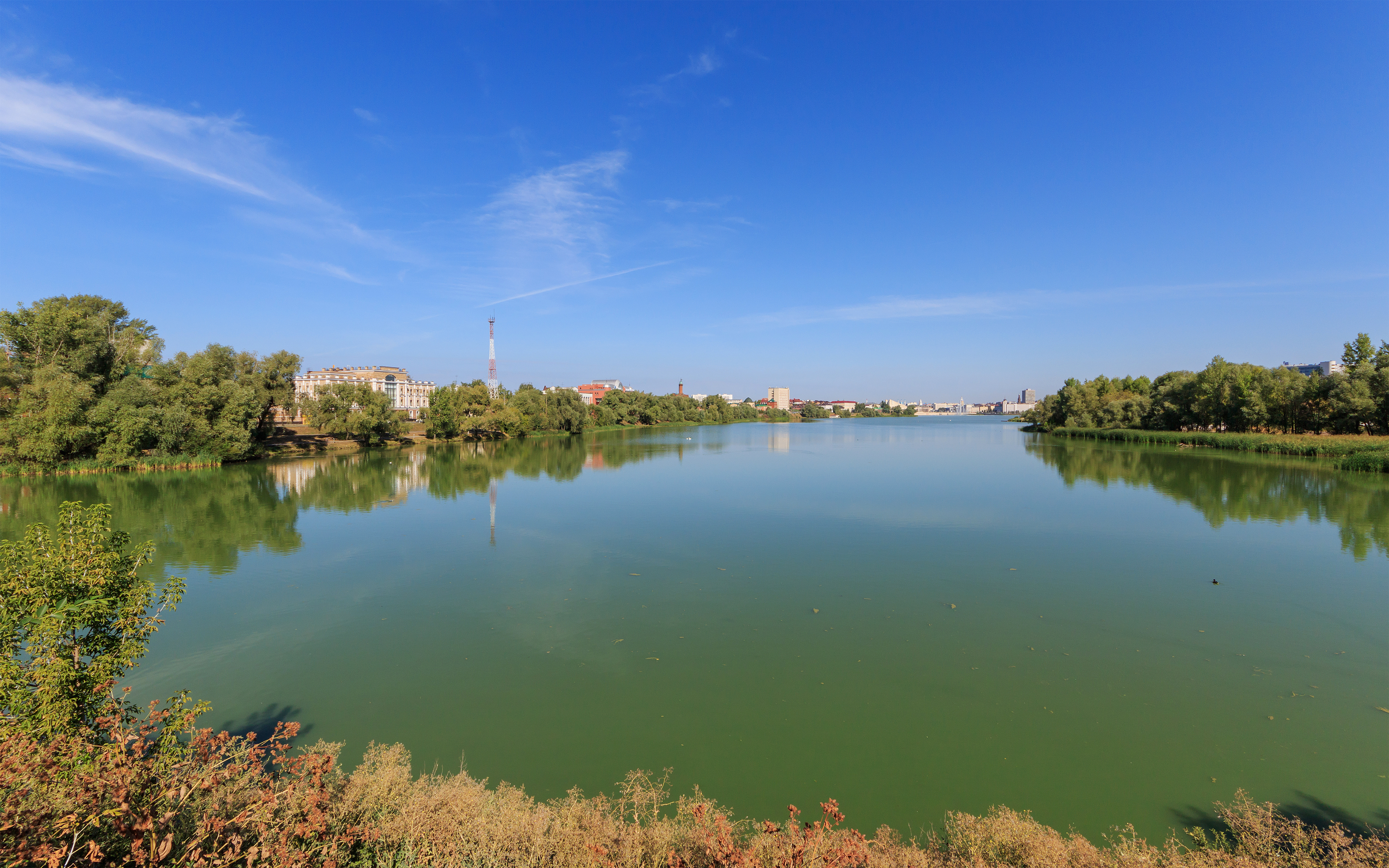
- Lower Kaban

- Location within Russia
- Coordinates: 55°46′30″N 49°7′25″E
- Lake type: Volga riverbed + karst processes
- Primary outflows: Bolaq
- Basin countries: Russia
- Max. length: 5,575 m (18,291 ft) (Nearby+Remote); 1,030 m (3,380 ft) (Upper)
- Max. width: 350 m (1,150 ft)
- Surface area: 1.86 km^{2} (0.72 sq mi)
- Max. depth: 12.5 m (41 ft)
- Water volume: 11.8×10^{6} m^{3} (420×10^{6} cu ft)
- Surface elevation: 51 m (167 ft)
- Settlements: Kazan

The Kaban Lakes (Tatar: Кабан күле; Russian: Кабан, lit. 'Boar') are a system of lakes in Kazan, Republic of Tatarstan, Russia that includes Nizhny (Blizhny) Kaban, Verkhny Kaban, and Sredny Kaban. They make up Tatarstan's largest lake, measuring 1.86 square kilometers (0.72 square miles) in total.

The lakes are connected with the Kazanka River by the Bolaq channel and a subterranean channel from Bolaq-Kazansu. The city's sewage system also connects them to the Volga River.

The Thousandth Anniversary of Islam Mosque is situated on the bank.

== Etymology ==
Also in Kazan there is a famous "Kaban Lake" similar to the name of the "Kuban River" - which translates from Nogai as "overflowing". The name originated in the 14th century with the Kipchak Tatars who came to these places, especially Astrakhan Nogais. The main now central Bauman Street that leads to the Kremlin is one of the oldest streets in Kazan. In the era of the Kazan Khanate, it was called the Nogai district.

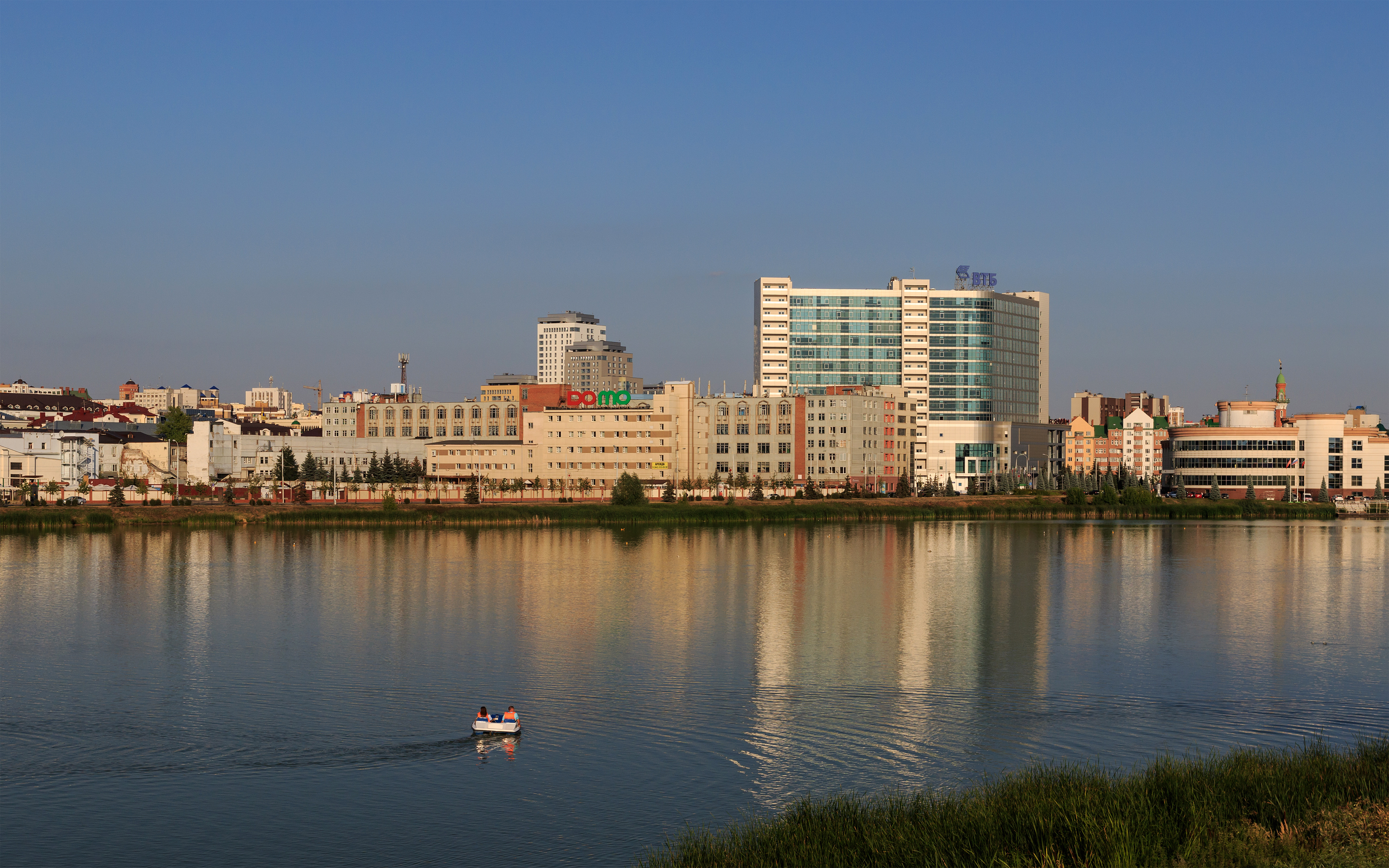
Cityscape at Lower Kaban

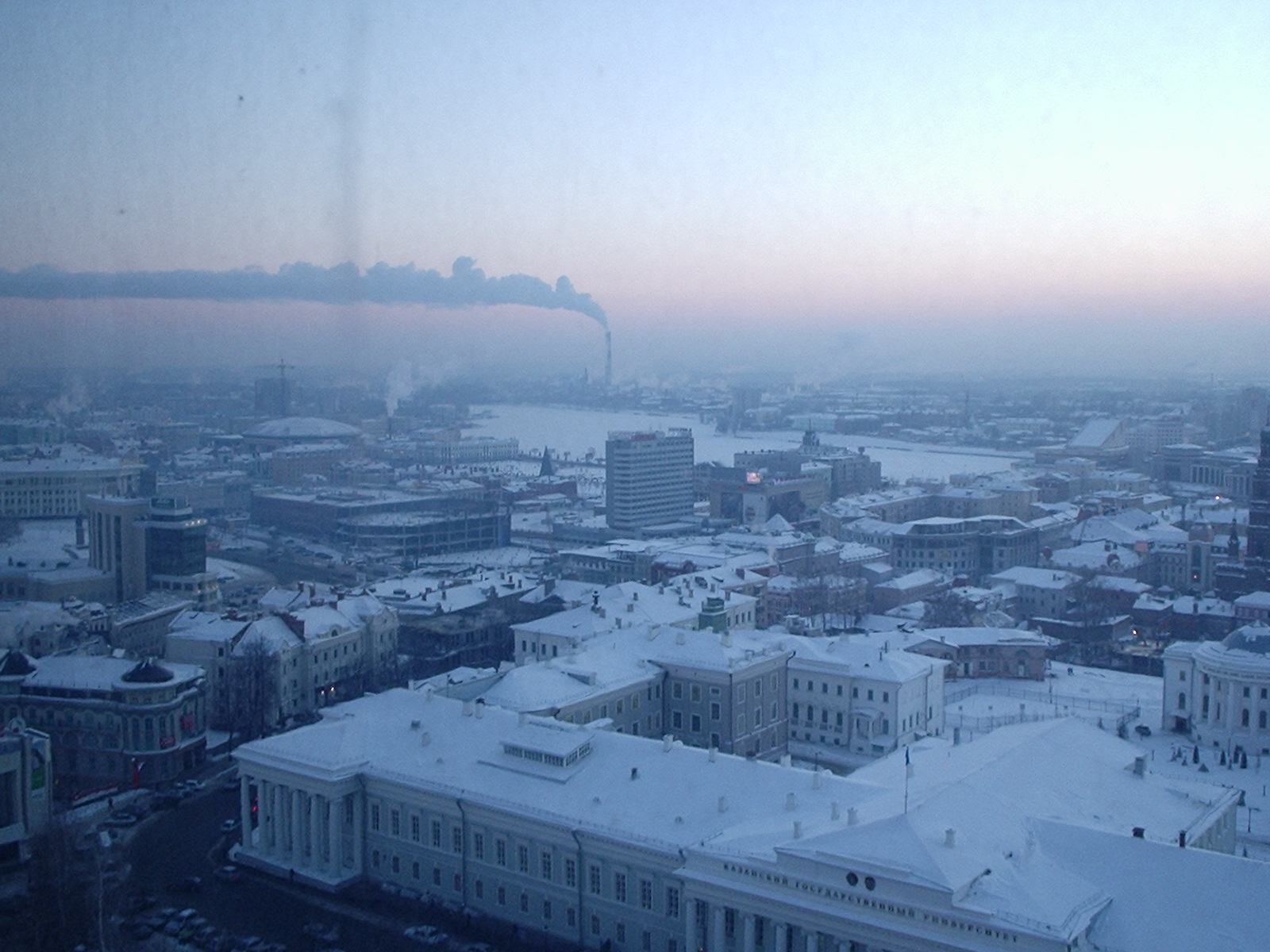
Frozen Kaban from Kazan State University's building

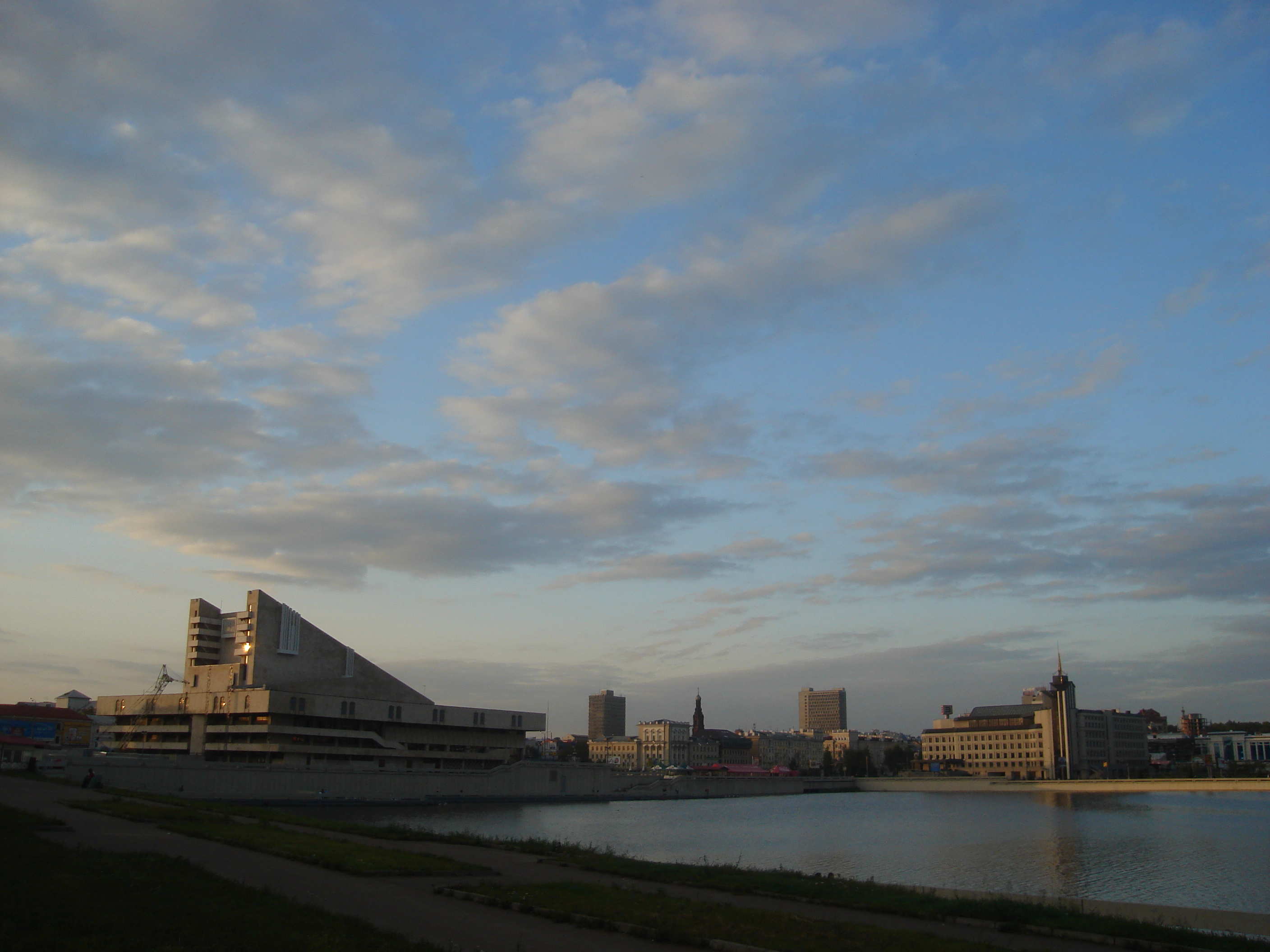
Kamal Theatre and Tatenergo office at the Kaban's embankment

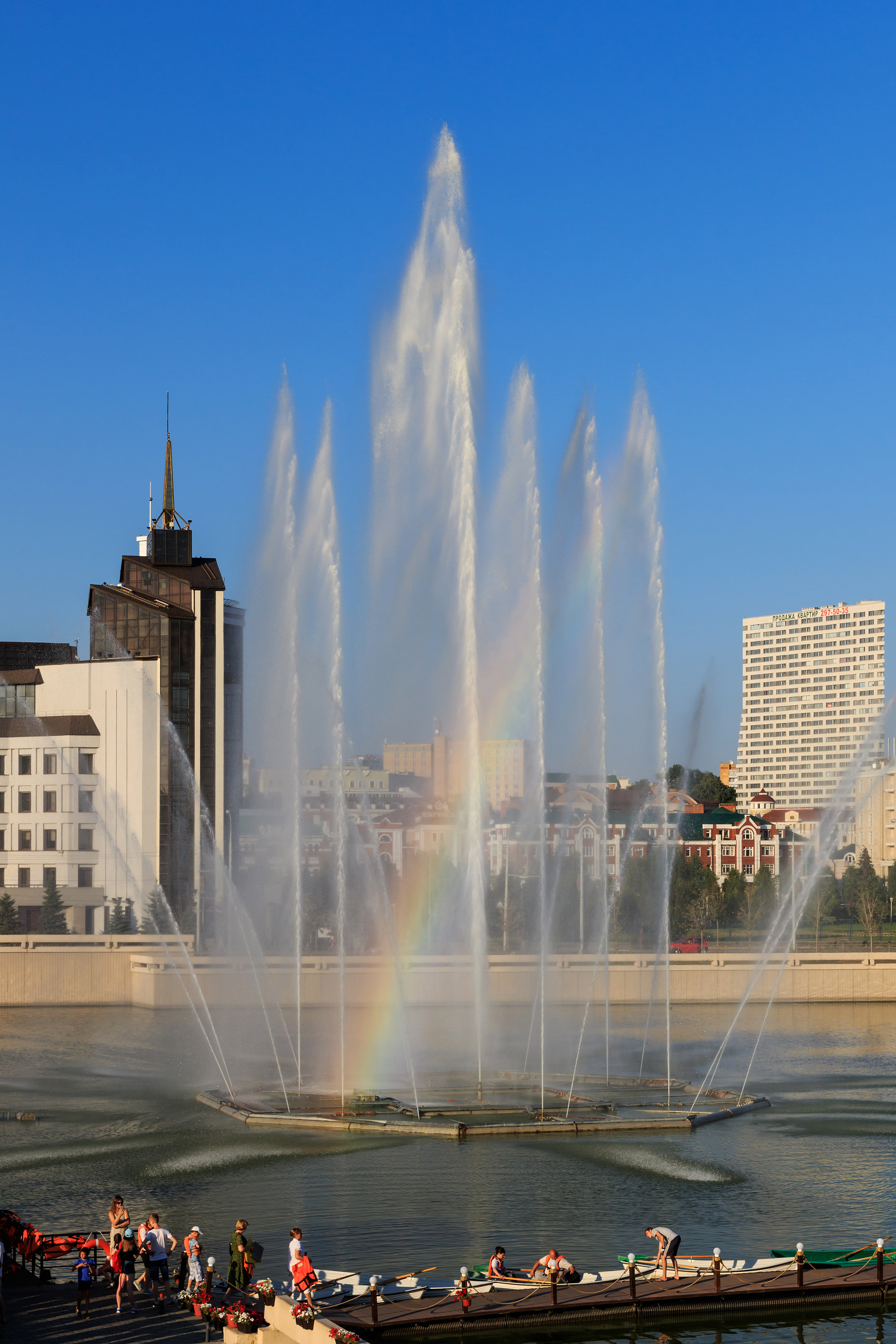
Fountain on Lower Kaban
