= Tatar Autonomous Soviet Socialist Republic =

Autonomous republic of the Russian SFSR (1920–1990)

Coordinates: 55°26′N 51°09′E

Tatar Autonomous Soviet Socialist Republic Татарская Автономная Советская Социалистическая Республика (Russian) Татарстан Автономияле Совет Социалистик Республикасы (Tatar)
- ASSR of the Russian SFSR de facto Associated state of the Russian Federation
- 1920–1992
- Flag (1981–1991) Emblem (1978–1992)

- Tatar ASSR (red)
- Capital: Kazan
- History
  - Established: 27 May 1920
  - Sovereignty declared: 30 August 1990
  - Renamed to the Republic of Tatarstan: 16 May 1992
- Contained within
  - Country: Russian SFSR (1920–1922); Soviet Union (1922–1991); Russia (1991–1992)
| Preceded by | Succeeded by |
| Kazan Governorate | Tatarstan |

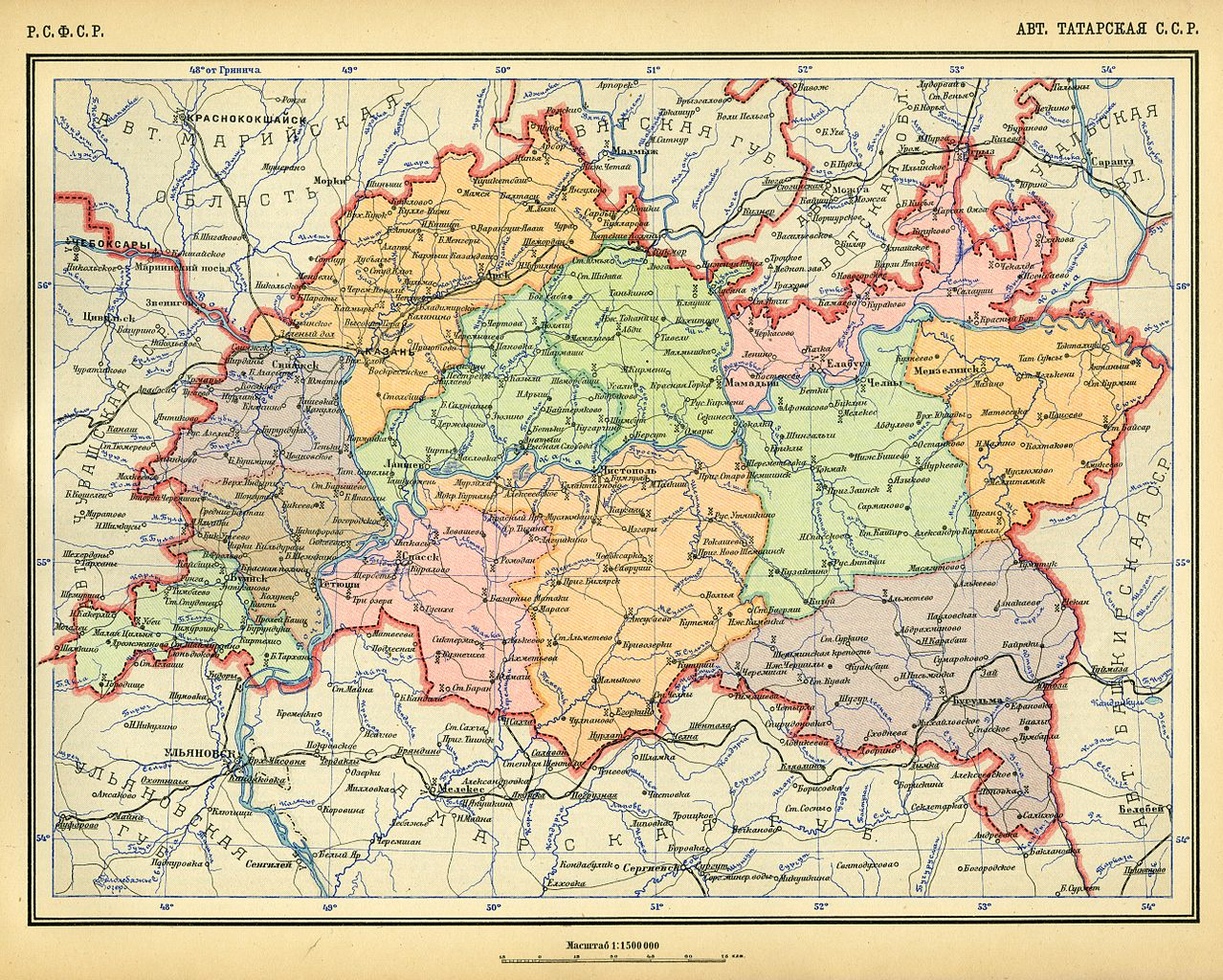
Map of Tatar A.S.S.R. In 1928

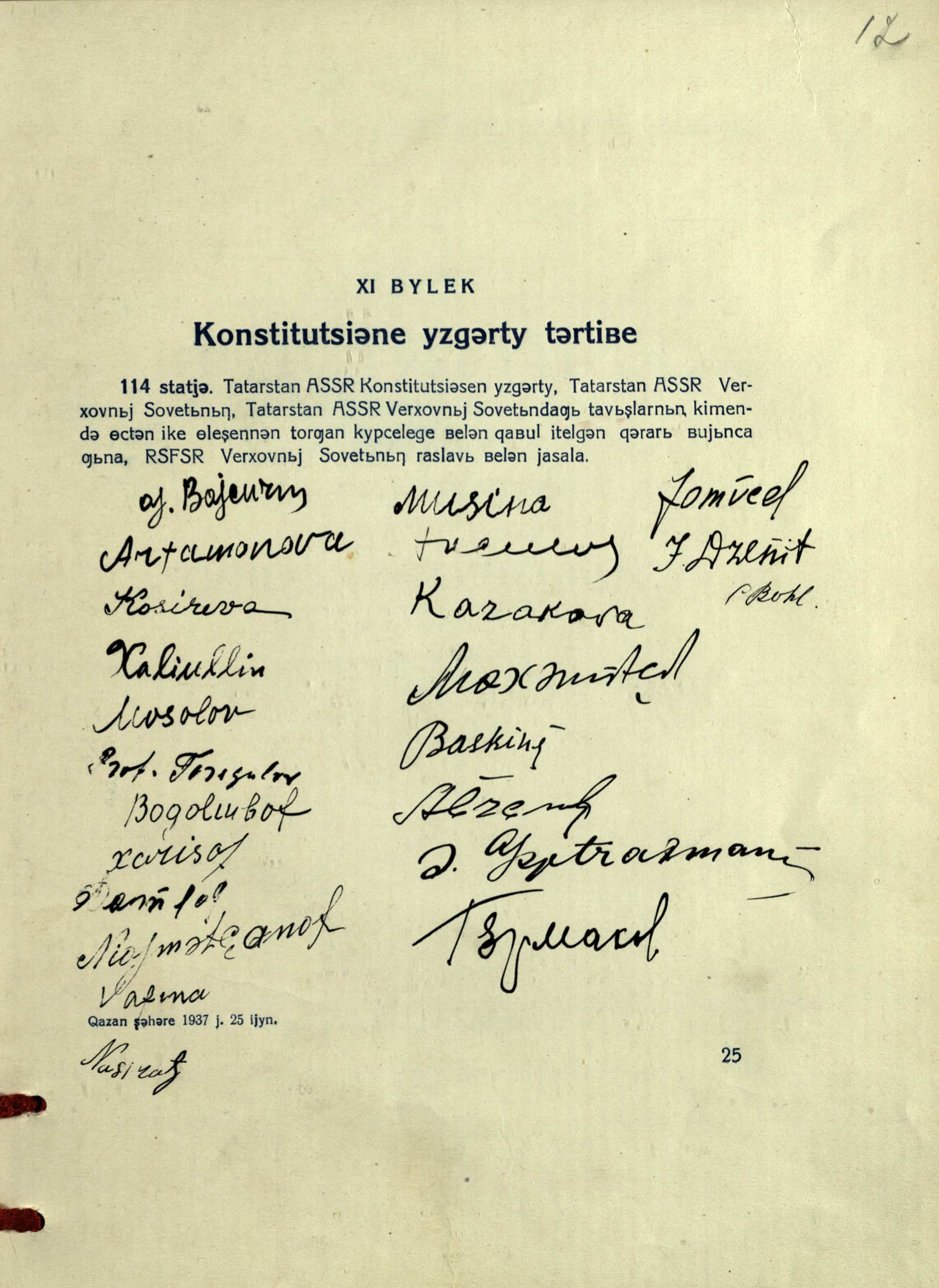
The TASSR Constitution, promulgated in 1937 by the Congress of Soviets of the Tatar ASSR

The Tatar Autonomous Soviet Socialist Republic, (Note: Russian: Татарская Автономная Советская Социалистическая Республика, romanized: Tatarskaya Avtonomnaya Sovetskaya Socialisticheskaya Respublika; Tatar: Татарстан Автономияле Совет Социалистик Республикасы, romanized: Tatarstan Avtonomiyale Sovet Sotsialistik Respublikası) abbreviated as Tatar ASSR, Tatarstan ASSR (Note: Russian: Татарская АССР, romanized: Tatarskaya ASSR; Tatar: Татарстан АССР, romanized: Tatarstan ASSR) or TASSR, (Note: Russian: ТАССР, romanized: TASSR; Tatar: ТАССР, romanized: TASSR) was an autonomous republic of the Russian SFSR. The resolution for its creation was signed on 27 May 1920 and the republic was proclaimed on 25 June 1920. Kazan served as its capital.

The territory of the TASSR was a part of Kazan, Simbirsk, and Ufa Governorates (or gubernias) of the Imperial Russia before the October Revolution of 1917.

- 27 May 1920: Tatar Autonomous Soviet Socialist Republic
- 30 August 1990: Tatar Soviet Socialist Republic
- 16 May 1992: Republic of Tatarstan

== Economic development ==
=== Pre-war economy ===
Foreman of the 6th brigade Shaikhiy Gatdrashitov indicates to collective farmer Galimov the time of his work according to the schedule. 1930s. Photo by B. Ivanitsky.

In 1921, the republic, like the adjacent Volga region, was struck by a drought that caused mass famine. To combat it, in 1921–22 the Tatar Republic received more than 8 million poods of seeds and 6 million poods of various food supplies from other regions of the country.

After the end of the Civil War, the restoration of the autonomous republic’s national economy began.

During the 1920s and 1930s, industrialisation took place throughout the Soviet Union. The Autonomous Tatar ASSR transitioned from a predominantly agrarian economy to an agrarian-industrial one. Old enterprises underwent major reconstruction, and new plants and factories were established. The industry of the Tatar ASSR developed at a rate exceeding the average industrial growth of both the RSFSR and the USSR. During the first Five-Year Plans, the largest machine-building, chemical, and light-industry enterprises in the autonomy were constructed. The number of workers grew, and national personnel were trained. Whereas in 1921 there were only 3,100 Tatar workers, technicians, and engineers at large enterprises (15.5%), by 1932 their number had risen to 16,400 (33.6%).

However, the republic’s only industrial hub (apart from the “Krasny Metallist” plant and the Bondyuzhsky chemical plant) was the capital, Kazan. In 1932, construction began there on the large aviation complex “Kazmash.”

At the same time, the collectivization of agriculture in the autonomy was carried out. In 1930, the first Machine Tractor Station (MTS) in the autonomy — Nurlat-Oktyabrskaya — was established. During the first Five-Year Plans, mechanization advanced so rapidly that for its achievements in agricultural development, Tatarstan was awarded the Order of Lenin on January 3, 1934.

=== Period of the Great Patriotic War ===
During the Great Patriotic War, factories as well as engineers from Moscow and the eastern regions of the country were evacuated to the Tatar ASSR.

Enterprises created and modernized before the war significantly increased production output, including the Kazan Optical-Mechanical Plant, Film Factory No. 8, and Lenin Powder Plant No. 40.

In the autumn of 1941, the “Moscow Aviation Plant No. 22 named after S. P. Gorbunov” was transferred to Kazan onto the territory of “Plant No. 124 named after Sergo Ordzhonikidze.”

On July 1, 1942, the Chistopol Watch Factory, established on the basis of the Second Moscow Watch Factory, began operating at full capacity.

Already in 1942, the Volga Rokada — a railway line along the Volga from Sviyazhsk to Stalingrad — was put into operation.

=== Post-war years ===
1962 Soviet stamp depicting Kazan's Lobachevsky Square

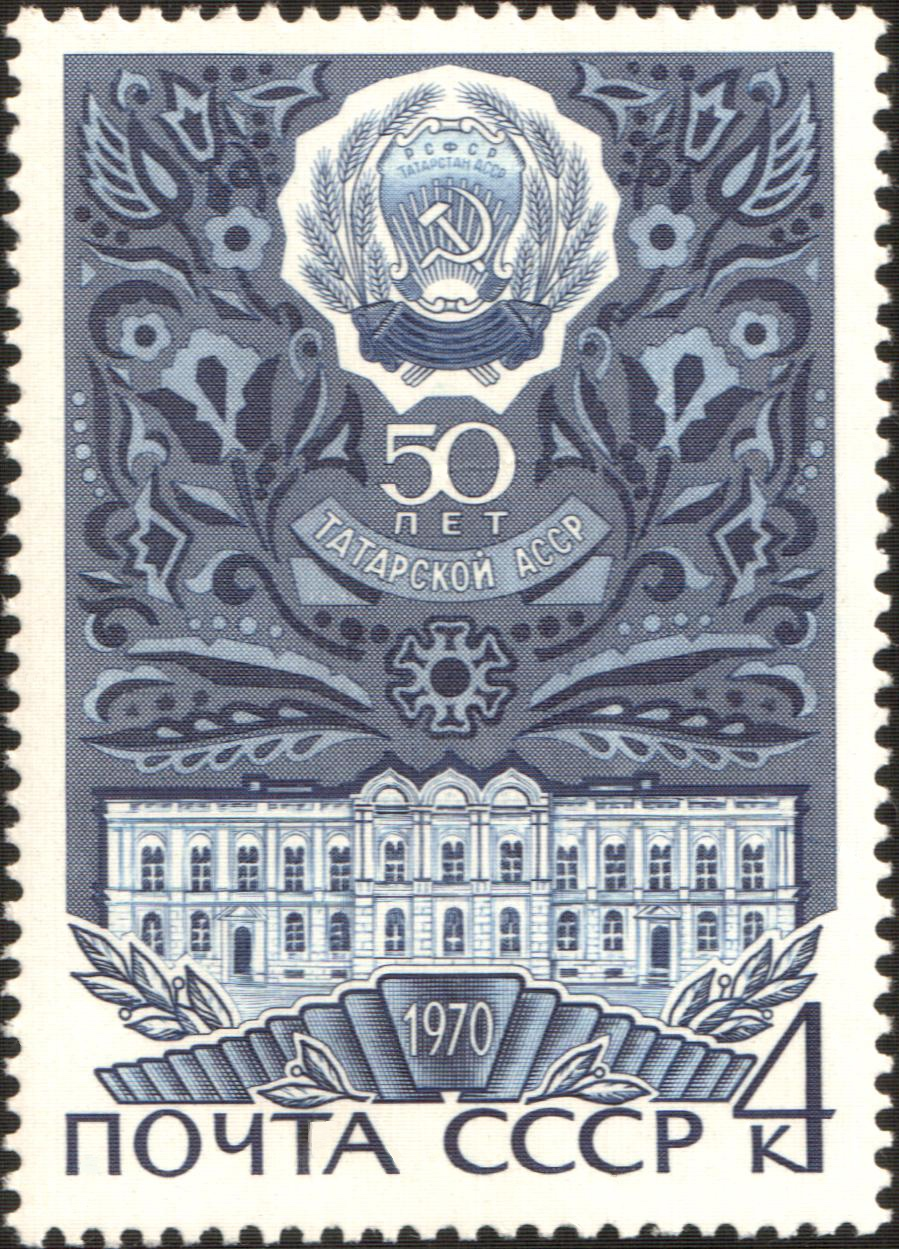
50th anniversary of the Tatar ASSR postage stamp (1970)

In the post-war years, the oil and gas industry developed rapidly in the Tatar ASSR. Development began on the supergiant Romashkino oil field.

In 1950, Tatarstan produced 867 thousand tons of oil, twelve times more than in 1947. From 1956 onward, Tatarstan held first place in the USSR for oil production for a long period. In 1966, 86.218 million tons were extracted there — 32.5% of all oil produced in the USSR. By 1970, production in Tatarstan had reached: oil — 101.9 million tons, gas — 3.882 billion m³.

To transport oil from the Volga-Ural oil and gas province to Eastern European COMECON countries, the “Druzhba” and “Druzhba-II” oil pipelines were built during the 1960s and 1970s.

For oil refining within Tatarstan itself, new industrial centers were established: Bugulma (Bugulmaneftemash, Tatneft), Leninogorsk (Leninogorskneftstroy), Nizhnekamsk (Nizhnekamskneftekhim), and Almetyevsk. In the capital, the “Organic Synthesis” plant was built.

Other sectors of the national economy also developed rapidly. In Kazan, a compressor plant was built, the medical-instrument plant was expanded, and the chemical-pharmaceutical plant and household chemicals plant were reconstructed. In the 1950s, Aircraft Plant No. 387 began producing helicopters, while the Sergo Plant in Zelenodolsk launched mass production of household refrigerators (“Mir,” “Sviyaga”).

Agriculture also advanced. The material and technical base of collective and state farms was significantly strengthened (in 1972, the Tatar ASSR had 583 collective farms and 168 state farms). Gross grain harvests amounted to 2.317 million tons in 1960 and 3.34 million tons in 1971.

With the commissioning of one of the world’s largest condensing power plants — the Zainsk State District Power Plant (GRES) — along with the construction of several other major power stations, including Kazan CHP-3, Nizhnekamsk CHP-1, and the Nizhnekamsk Hydroelectric Power Station, the republic fully met its own electricity needs and became an exporter of electricity to other regions of the country.

In the 1970s, construction began on the Kama Automobile Plant complex near Naberezhnye Chelny and the Nizhnekamsk tire plant. Railway connections were built to them from the Gorky and Kuybyshev railway lines.

For major achievements in economic and cultural development and in connection with the 50th anniversary of the Tatar ASSR, on June 24, 1970, it was awarded the Order of the October Revolution, and on December 29, 1972, the Order of Friendship of Peoples.

In the 1980s, the industrial potential of Mendeleyevsk was expanded with the construction of the Novo-Mendeleyevsk Chemical Plant. Construction also began, but was not completed, on the Tatar Nuclear Power Plant in Kamskiye Polyany and the Kama Tractor Plant in Yelabuga.

As of 1989, the republic’s housing stock totaled 57,761,950 m² (424,181 buildings), including 40,636,288 m² in cities and urban-type settlements (124,412 buildings), of which 17,617,422 m² were in Kazan; and 17,125,662 m² in rural areas (299,769 buildings).

Housing managed by local councils accounted for 11,308,720 m² (11,599 buildings, housing 730,598 people), including 11,091,868 m² in urban areas (9,471 buildings, 715,896 residents), of which 6,426,593 m² were in Kazan (407,322 residents), and 216,852 m² in rural areas (2,128 buildings, 14,702 residents).

Departmental housing stock amounted to 25,999,986 m² (23,890 buildings, 1,909,448 residents), including 22,910,101 m² in urban areas (15,886 buildings, 1,725,891 residents), of which 6,581,270 m² were in Kazan (456,448 residents), and 3,089,885 m² in rural areas (8,004 buildings, 183,557 residents).

Housing belonging to cooperative enterprises (excluding housing cooperatives) and organizations of the Centrosoyuz system amounted to 1,094,163 m² (1,052 buildings, 121,224 residents), including 145,458 m² in urban areas (479 buildings, 65,711 residents), of which 40,851 m² were in Kazan (2,530 residents), and 948,705 m² in rural areas (573 buildings, 55,513 residents).

Housing construction cooperatives possessed 1,741,559 m² (345 buildings, 102,385 residents), including 1,433,271 m² in Kazan (84,982 residents).

Privately owned housing accounted for 17,617,422 m² (387,295 buildings), including 4,747,302 m² in urban areas and urban-type settlements (98,321 buildings), of which 1,810,216 m² were in Kazan, and 12,870,120 m² in rural areas (289,064 buildings).

== Notable people ==
- Gabdulkhay Akhatov – professor and Turkologist
- Youri Egorov - pianist
- Sofia Gubaidulina – composer
- Rustem Kildibekov – painter and creator of monumental art
- Chulpan Khamatova – film, theater and TV actress
- Mintimer Shaimiev – politician, the first secretary of the Tatar Regional Committee of the CPSU
- Boris Yeltsin – first Russian president (1991–1999)
- Röstäm Yaxin – composer
- Ravil Maganov – chairman of Lukoil (2020–2022)
- Valery Gerasimov – incumbent Russian Chief of General Staff
- Alsou - Singer and actress; Russian representative at the Eurovision Song Contest 2000

== See also ==
- 1921–1922 famine in Tatarstan
- Communist Party of the Republic of Tatarstan
- Tatarstan Regional Committee of the Communist Party of the Soviet Union
