= Kazanka (river) =

River in Tatarstan, Russia

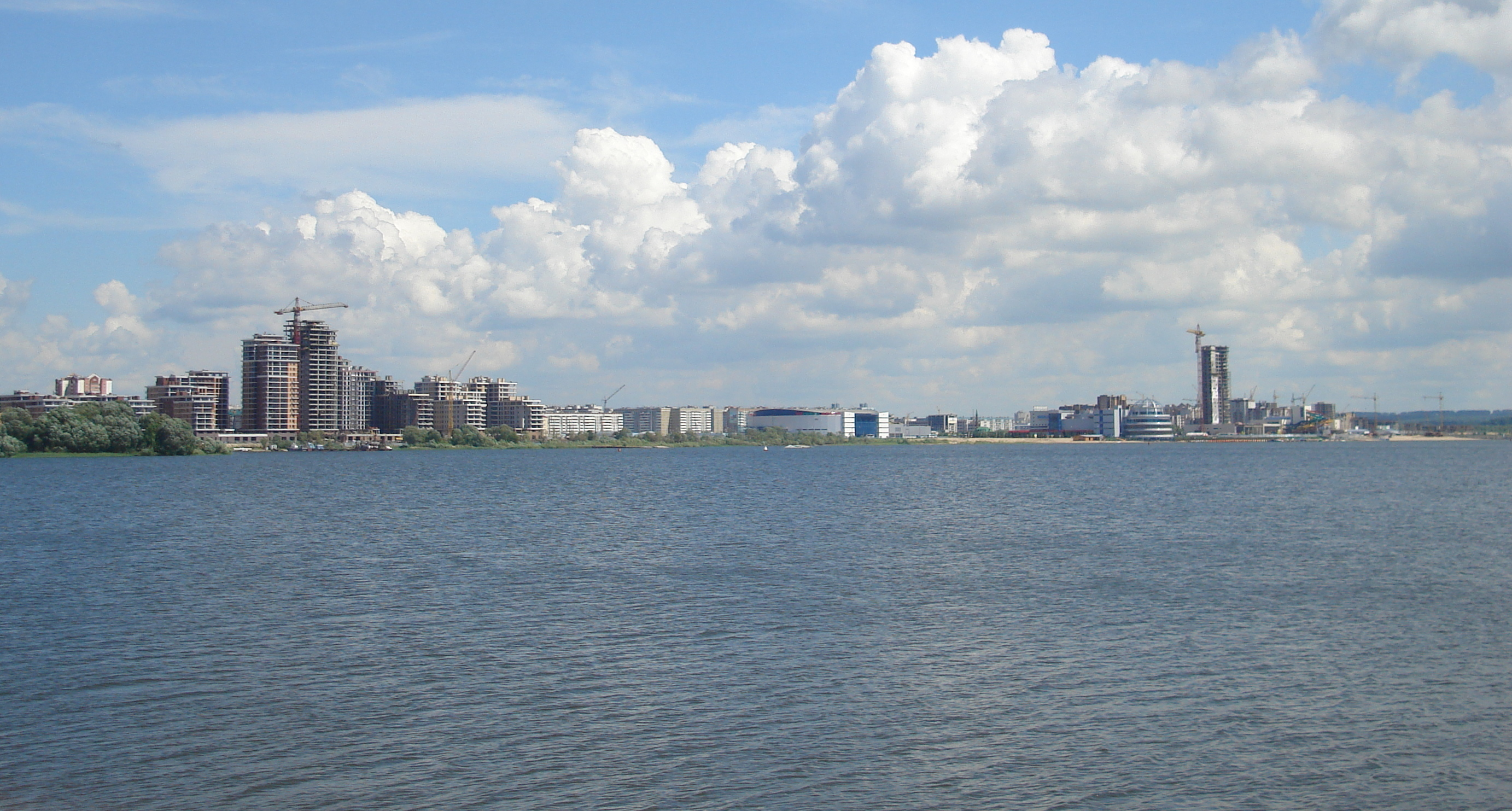
- The Kazanka in Kazan

Location
- Country: Russia

Physical characteristics
- Source
  - location: Bimeri, Arsk District
- Mouth: Volga
  - location: Kuybyshev Reservoir in Kazan
  - coordinates: 55.8341°N 49.078°E
  - elevation: 53 m (174 ft)
- Length: 142 km (88 mi)
- Basin size: 2,600 km^{2} (1,000 sq mi)
- Discharge
  - average: 299 m^{3}/s (10,600 cu ft/s) (near mouth)

Basin features
- Progression: Volga→ Caspian Sea

The Kazanka (Russian: Каза́нка; Tatar: Казансу) is a river in the Russian Federation, a left tributary of the Volga. The Kazanka begins near the village of Bimeri in Arsk District and flows into the Kuybyshev Reservoir in Kazan, near the Kazan Kremlin. Other towns on the Kazanka are Arsk and historical Iske Kazan. The river is 142 kilometres (88 mi) long, and has a drainage basin of 2,600 square kilometres (1,000 sq mi). The main tributaries are the Iya, Kismes, Shimyakovka and Sula. Historically, the Bulak river flowed into Kazanka until it was separated by a dam in 1957. The maximum river discharge is 299 cubic metres per second (10,600 cu ft/s), and the minimal mineralization is 400–1000 mg/L. In Tatarstan, the Kazanka has a status of a natural monument.

During the construction of the Samara Reservoir, a lower part of the Kazanka valley was flooded. A part of the riverbed was separated from the reservoir by dams, creating a new riverbed. In 2008, a project was proposed to fill in a cove in the wide section of the estuary for a business district.

The Kazanka divides the city of Kazan into two almost equal parts. Six bridges within the city cross the Kazanka; the most notable among them is the Millennium Bridge.

== See also ==
- Kazanka (boat)
- Bulak
