= Aq Bars =

Official emblem of Tatarstan

Coat of arms of the Republic of Tatarstan
- Armiger: Republic of Tatarstan
- Adopted: February 7, 1992; 33 years ago

Aq Bars (Tatar: Ак Барс [ɑq ˈbɑrs]) or Ak Bars (Russian: Ак Барс [ɐg‿ˈbars]) is an ancient Bulgar symbol, which has served as the official symbol of the Republic of Tatarstan since the dissolution of the Soviet Union in 7 February 1992. Its name is translated literally as 'White Leopard', and it typically refers to the snow leopard.

Historically, this symbol was used in Volga Bulgaria and the Khanate of Kazan (Qazan) – predecessors of Tatarstan – as a state symbol. The snow leopard symbol comes from the totems of one of the Bulgar tribes – the Barsil. According to legend, the Barsils founded Bilär in Volga Bulgaria.

The creator of the current emblem is the artist Rif Fäxretdinov (Риф Фәхретдинов).

== Historical coats of arms ==
The Russian coat of arms of Volga Bulgaria: a green shield with a silver walking lamb, holding a red gonfalone, divided by a silver cross, with a golden staff.

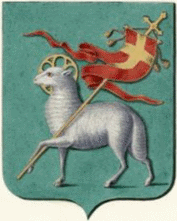
The Russian coat of Arms of Volga Bulgaria

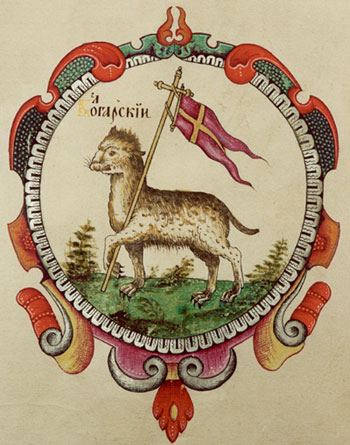
A Russian seal, featuring the coat of arms of the Bulgarian king

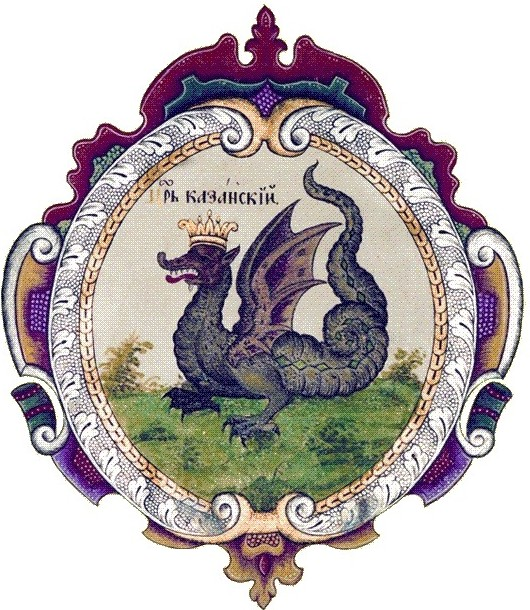
Seal of the Kazan kingdom from the royal titular book of 1672.

Kazan Governorate (1856–1920)

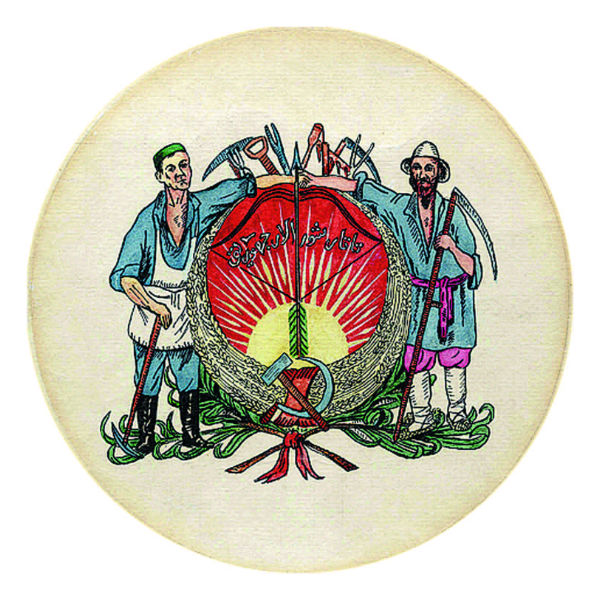
Emblem of the Tatar ASSR (1920–1926)

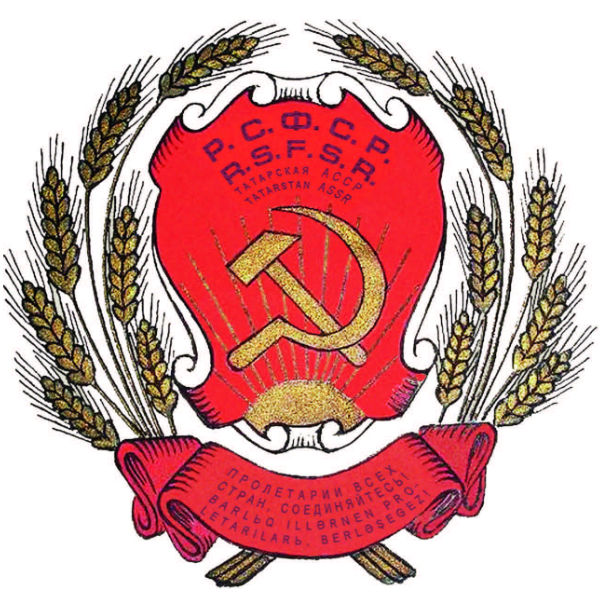
Emblem of the Tatar ASSR (1937–1978)

Emblem of the Tatar ASSR (1978–1992)

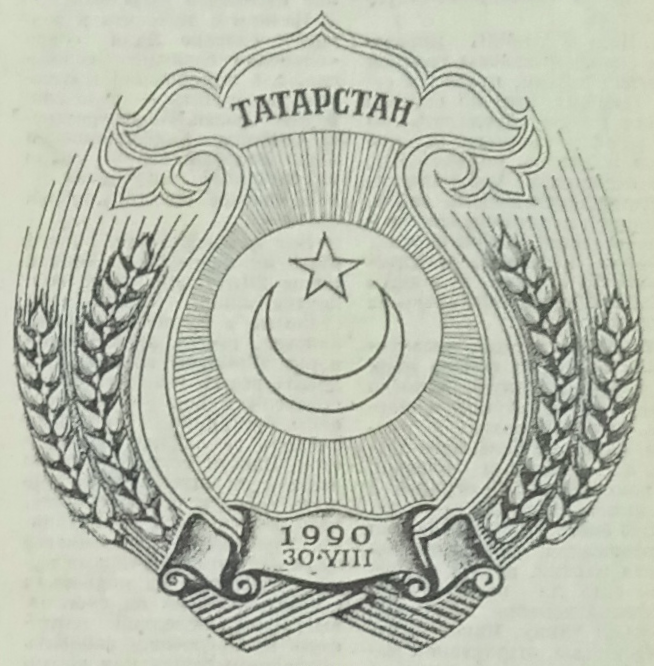
Proposed coat of arms for the Tatar SSR (1991)

== See also ==
- Flag of Tatarstan
- Ak Bars Kazan - this coat of arms is the hockey team's secondary logo, used extensively on their jerseys
- Zilant
