= Mukhammat Sabirov =

Tatar politician and engineer (1932–2015)

Prime Minister of Tatarstan
- In office 5 July 1991 – 17 January 1995
- President: Mintimer Shaimiev
- Preceded by: Office created
- Succeeded by: Farid Mukhametshin

Chairman of the Council of Ministers of the Tatar ASSR
- In office 30 August 1990 – 5 July 1991
- Preceded by: Mintimer Shaimiev
- Succeeded by: Office abolished

Personal details
- Born: 29 March 1932 Novokurmashevo, Kushnarenkovsky District, Bashkir ASSR, Russian SFSR, Soviet Union
- Died: 9 March 2015 (aged 82) Kazan, Russia

Mukhammat Gallyamovich Sabirov (Note: Russian: Мухаммат Галлямович Сабиров; Tatar: Мөхәммәт Галләм улы Сабиров) (29 March 1932 – 9 March 2015) was a Russian engineer and politician. He served as the first Prime Minister of Tatarstan from 1991 to 1995.

Sabirov began a lengthy career as an engineer at Almetievskburneft in 1955. He served as the first Prime Minister of Tatarstan, the head of government of the republic, from 1991 to 1995.

Sabirov died on 9 March 2015 at the age of 82. His memorial service was held at the national culture centre in Kazan on 10 March 2015. Dignitaries in attendance at the service included Ildar Khalikov and former President and state counsellor, Mintimer Shaimiev. Sabirov was buried in Arsk cemetery in Kazan.

== Awards ==
- Order of Friendship (1997)
- Certificate of Honor of the Presidium of the Supreme Council of the Russian Federation (1992)

== Personal life ==
Sabirov was married. He has a daughter, two sons, grandchildren and great-grandchildren.
