= Prime Minister of the Republic of Tatarstan =

- Incumbent; Alexey Pesoshin since 3 April 2017
- Inaugural holder: Mukhammat Sabirov
- Formation: 5 July 1991

The Prime Minister of the Republic of Tatarstan serves as the head of government of Tatarstan, a republic of Russia. Mukhammat Sabirov served as Tatarstan's first prime minister.

== List of prime ministers of Tatarstan ==
| No. | Portrait | Name (born–died) | Term of office | | | Political party |
| No. | Portrait | Name (born–died) | Took office | Left office | Time in office | Political party |
|---|---|---|---|---|---|---|
| 1 | | Mukhammat Sabirov (1932–2015) | 5 July 1991 | 17 January 1995 | 3 years, 196 days | Communist Party of the Soviet Union |
| 1 | | Mukhammat Sabirov (1932–2015) | 5 July 1991 | 17 January 1995 | 3 years, 196 days | Independent |
| 2 | | Farid Mukhametshin (born 1947) | 17 January 1995 | 27 May 1998 | 3 years, 130 days | Independent |
| – | | Mintimer Shaimiev (born 1937) (acting) | 27 May 1998 | 10 July 1998 | 44 days | Independent |
| 3 | | Rustam Minnikhanov (born 1957) | 10 July 1998 | 25 March 2010 | 11 years, 258 days | Independent |
| 3 | | Rustam Minnikhanov (born 1957) | 10 July 1998 | 25 March 2010 | 11 years, 258 days | United Russia |
| 4 | | Ildar Khalikov (born 1967) | 25 March 2010 | 3 April 2017 | 7 years, 9 days | United Russia |
| 5 | | Alexey Pesoshin (born 1963) | 3 April 2017 | Incumbent | 9 years, 158 days | United Russia |
