= Alexey Pesoshin =

Tatar politician and engineer (born 1963)

- Алексей Валерьевич; Валерьевич Песошин
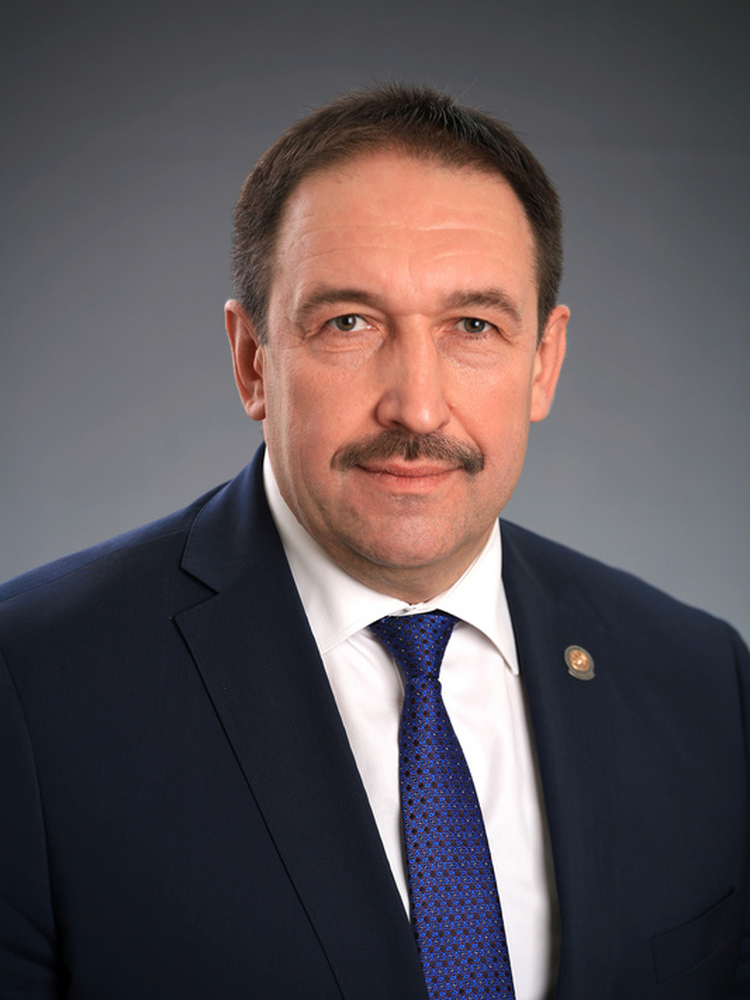
- Official portrait, 2018

Prime Minister of Tatarstan
- Incumbent
- Assumed office 17 April 2017
- Preceded by: Ildar Khalikov

Personal details
- Born: Alexey Valeryevich Pesoshin; 9 December 1963 (age 62) Kazan, Tatar ASSR, Russian SFSR, Soviet Union
- Party: United Russia
- Spouse: Larisa Pashushina
- Children: 1
- Education: Kazan Federal University

Alexey Pesoshin (born 12 December 1963 in Kazan, Tatarstan) is a Russian engineer and politician who has served as the prime minister of the Republic of Tatarstan since April 17, 2017.
