= Tatarstan =

First-level administrative division of Russia

Republic of Tatarstan Республика Татарстан (Russian)
- Republic

Other transcription(s)
  - Tatar: Татарстан Республикасы
  - Romanization: Tatarstan Respublikası
  - Tatar: Татарстан Җөмһүрияте
  - Romanization: Tatarstan Cömhüriyäte
- Flag Coat of arms
- Anthem: Государственный гимн Республики Татарстан (Russian); Татарстан Республикасының Дәүләт гимны (Tatar) "State Anthem of the Republic of Tatarstan"
- Interactive map of Republic of Tatarstan
- Location within European Russia
- Coordinates: 55°33′N 50°56′E
- Country: Russia
- Federal district: Volga
- Economic region: Volga
- Capital: Kazan

Government
  - Type: State Council
  - Head: Rustam Minnikhanov
  - Prime Minister: Alexey Pesoshin

Area
  - Total: 67,847 km^{2} (26,196 sq mi)

Population (2021 Census)
  - Total: ▲4,004,809: 53.6% Tatars; 40.3% Russians; 2.3% Chuvash; 3.8% other
  - Estimate (2018): 3,894,284
  - Rank: 8th
  - Density: 59.03/km^{2} (152.9/sq mi)
- Demonym: Tatar

GDP (nominal, 2024)
  - Total: ₽5.46 trillion (US$64.1 billion)
  - Per capita: ₽1.36 million (US$15,980.09)
- Time zone: UTC+3 (MSK)
- ISO 3166 code: RU-TA
- License plates: 16, 116, 716
- OKTMO ID: 92000000
- Official languages: Russian; Tatar
- Website: tatarstan.ru

100th Anniversary of the Establishment of the Tatar Autonomous Soviet Socialist Republic Slogan, Logo

Tatarstan, (Note: /ˈtɑːtərstæn/; Tatar: Татарстан, romanized: Tatarstan, pronounced [tɒtɒrˈstɑn]; Russian: Татарстан, romanized: Tatarstan, pronounced [tətɐrˈstan]) officially the Republic of Tatarstan, (Note: Tatar: Татарстан Республикасы, romanized: Tatarstan Respublikası; Russian: Республика Татарстан, romanized: Respublika Tatarstan, pronounced [rʲɪsˈpublʲɪkə tətɐrˈstan]) sometimes also called Tataria, (Note: Tatar: Татария, romanized: Tatariâ; Russian: Татария, romanized: Tatariya) is a republic of Russia located in Eastern Europe. It is a part of the Volga Federal District; and its capital and largest city is Kazan, an important cultural centre in Russia. The region's main source of wealth is oil with a strong petrochemical industry.

The republic borders the oblasts of Kirov, Ulyanovsk, Samara, and Orenburg, as well as the republics of Mari El, Udmurtia, Chuvashia, and Bashkortostan. Tatarstan has strong cultural, linguistic and ethnic ties with its eastern neighbour, Bashkortostan, which is also a republic of Russia. The area of Tatarstan is 68,000 square kilometres (26,000 mi^{2}), occupying 0.4% of the total surface of the country. As of the 2021 census, the population of Tatarstan was 4,004,809.

The earliest known organised state within the boundaries of Tatarstan was Volga Bulgaria, which adopted Islam in 922. This is celebrated yearly in the city of Bolgar. Other historical predecessors of Tatarstan include the Golden Horde and the Khanate of Kazan, before ultimately being conquered by Russia. In 1920, the modern Tatar state, known as the Tatar ASSR, was founded as an autonomous republic of the Russian SFSR. It was renamed the Republic of Tatarstan in 1992 and became a federal subject of Russia.

The official languages of the republic are Tatar and Russian. The head of Tatarstan is Rustam Minnihanov. Religious leaders include the mufti Kamil Samigullin and the metropolitan bishop Cyril Nakonechny.

== Etymology ==
"Tatarstan" derives from the name of the ethnic group—the Tatars—and the Persian suffix -stan (meaning "state" or "country" of, an ending common to many Eurasian countries). Another version of the Russian name is "Татария" (Tatariya), which was official along with "Tatar ASSR" during Soviet rule.

Alternative spelling of the Persian suffix -stan would use i/e after a consonant. For example, Turkish spells Tatarstan as "Tataristan", and occasionally in Tatar, it is "Tatarıstan" (Татарыстан).

In addition to the official "Tatarstan respublikası", the name Tatarstan Cömhüriyäte (Татарстан Җөмһүрияте, from Arabic جمهورية) is used as well.

== Geography ==
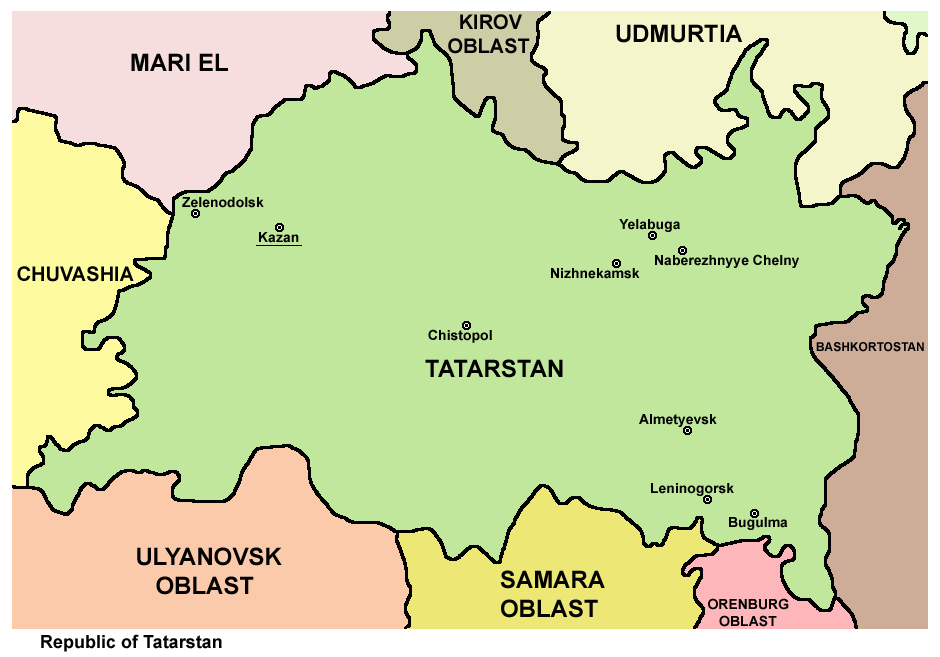
Map of the Republic of Tatarstan

The republic is located in the centre of the East European Plain, approximately 800 kilometres (500 mi) east of Moscow. It lies between the Volga River and the Kama River (a tributary of the Volga), and extends east to the Ural Mountains.

Oak is the dominant tree species on 87% of the total area, followed by aspen, linden, birch, and Scots pine. The total forest cover has decreased from 51.2% to 17.1% over the last 300 years.

The Volga-Kama Nature Reserve is situated in Tatarstan.

=== Borders ===
- Neighbours: Kirov Oblast (N), Udmurt Republic (N/NE), Republic of Bashkortostan (E/SE), Orenburg Oblast (SE), Samara Oblast (S), Ulyanovsk Oblast (S/SW), Chuvash Republic (W), Mari El Republic (W/NW).
- Highest point: 381 m (1,250 ft)
- Maximum N–S distance: 290 km (180 mi)
- Maximum E–W distance: 460 km (290 mi)

=== Rivers ===
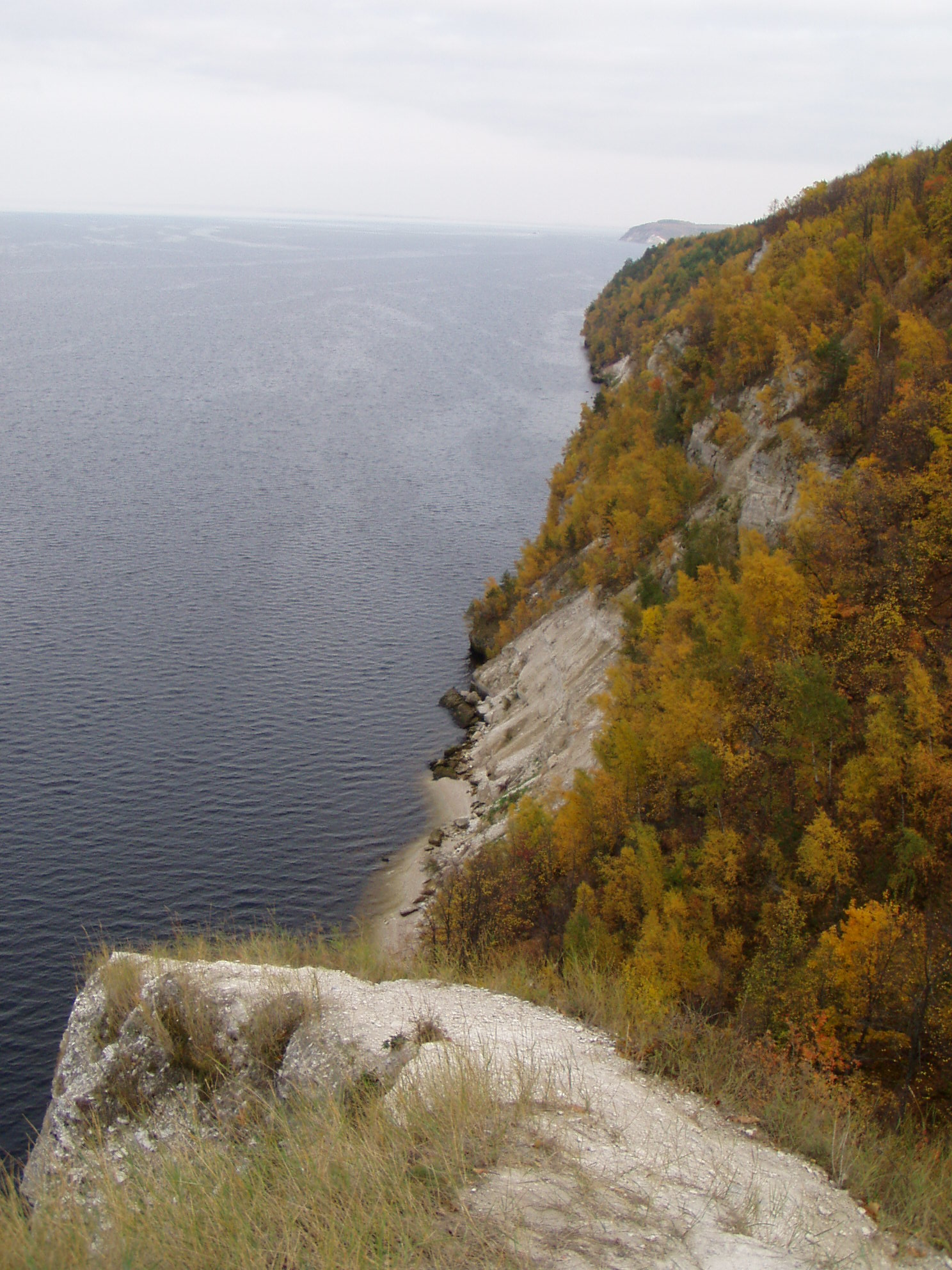
View of the Volga River at the confluence with the Kama River

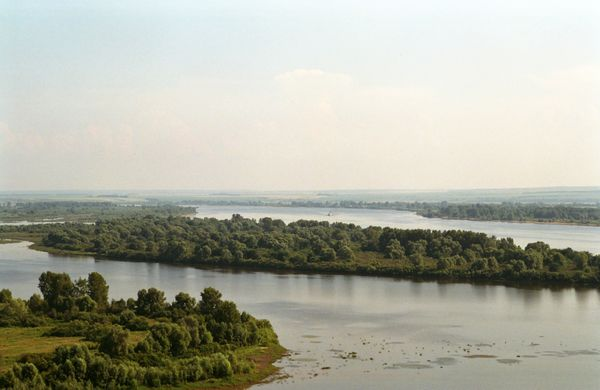
View over the Toyma River from Devil's Tower in Yelabuga

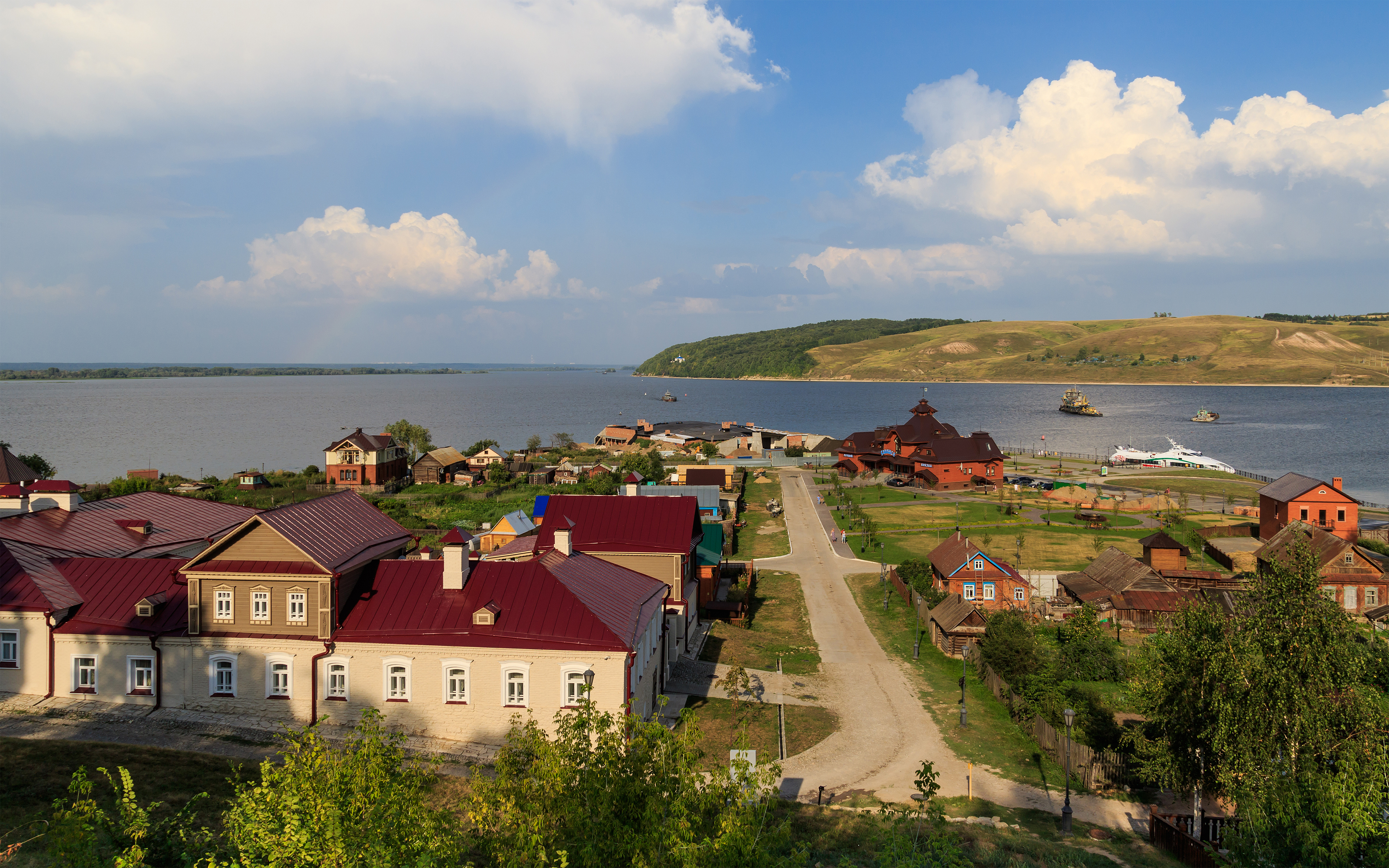
Sviyazhsk, located at the confluence of the Volga and Sviyaga rivers

Major rivers include:

- Azevka River
- Belaya River
- Ik River
- Kama River
- Volga River
- Vyatka River
- Kazanka River
- Zay River

=== Lakes ===
Major reservoirs of the republic include:

- Kuybyshev Reservoir
- Lower Kama Reservoir
- Zainsk Reservoir

The biggest lake is Kaban. The biggest swamp is Kulyagash.

=== Hills ===
- Bugulma-Belebey Upland
- Volga Upland
- Vyatskiye Uvaly

=== Basins ===
- Ulema basin
- Mesha basin

=== Natural resources ===
The major natural resources of Tatarstan include oil, natural gas and gypsum. It is estimated that the republic has over one billion tons of oil deposits.

=== Climate ===
- Average January temperature: −15 °C (5 °F)
- Average July temperature: +18 °C (64 °F)
- Average annual temperature: +4 °C (39 °F)
- Average annual precipitation: up to 500 to 550 mm (20 to 22 in)

== Administrative divisions ==
Tatarstan's administrative and territorial divisions form 43 municipal districts and 2 urban districts (Kazan and Naberezhnye Chelny), as well as 39 urban settlements and 872 rural settlements.

== History ==
=== Middle Ages ===
The earliest known organised state within the boundaries of modern Tatarstan was Volga Bulgaria (c. 700–1238). The Volga Bulgars had an advanced mercantile state with trade contacts throughout Inner Eurasia, the Middle East, and the Baltic, and maintained its independence despite pressure from such powers as the Khazars, the Kievan Rus', and the Cuman-Kipchaks. Islam was introduced by missionaries from Baghdad around the time of Ibn Fadlan's journey in 922.

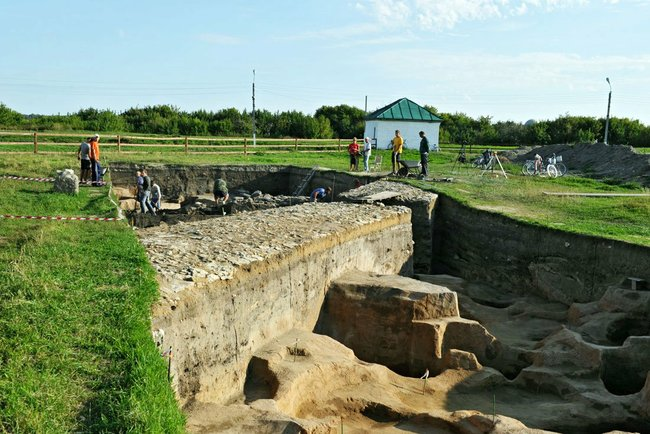
Archaeological works at Bolgar

Volga Bulgaria finally fell to the armies of the Mongol prince Batu Khan in the late 1230s (see Mongol invasion of Volga Bulgaria). The inhabitants, a large number of whom were killed and the rest mixing with the Golden Horde's Kipchaks, became known as the Volga Tatars. In the 1430s, the region again became independent as the base of the Khanate of Kazan, with its capital established in Kazan, 170 km (110 mi) up the Volga from the ruined capital of the Bulgars.

The Khanate of Kazan was conquered by the troops of Tsar Ivan the Terrible in the 1550s, with Kazan being taken in 1552. A large number of Tatars were forcibly converted to Christianity and were culturally Russified. Cathedrals were built in Kazan; by 1593, all mosques in the area had been destroyed. The Russian government forbade the construction of mosques, a prohibition that was not lifted until the 18th century, during the reign of Catherine the Great. The first mosque to be rebuilt under Catherine's auspices was constructed in 1766–1770.

=== 19th century ===
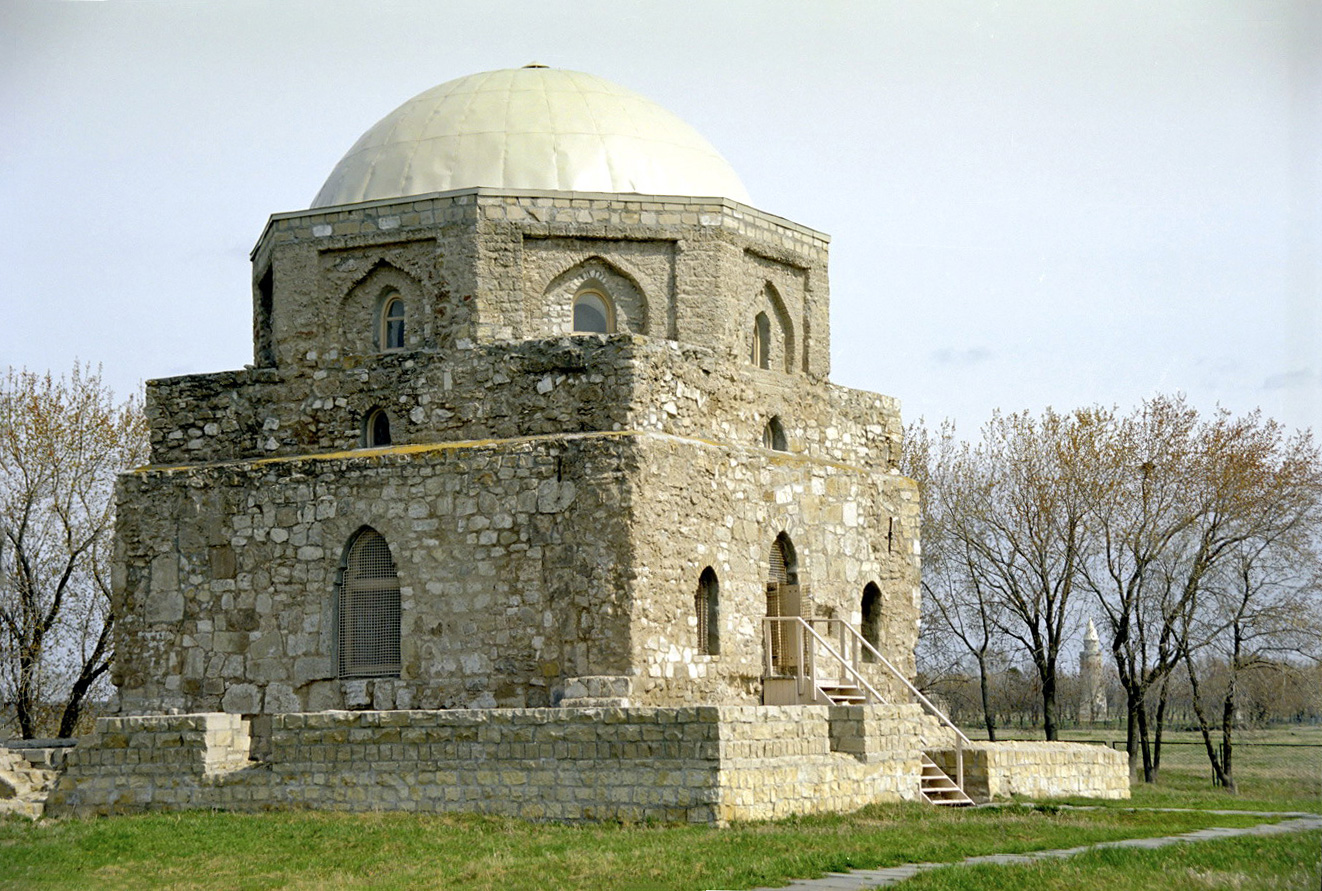
An ancient mosque in Bolgar

In the 19th century, Tatarstan became a centre of Jadidism, an Islamic movement that preached tolerance of other religions. Under the influence of local Jadidist theologians, the Bulgars were renowned for their friendly relations with other peoples of the Russian Empire.

=== 20th century ===
During the Civil War of 1918–1920 Tatar nationalists attempted to establish an independent republic (the Idel-Ural State, Idel being the name of the Volga in Tatar) along with the neighbouring Bashkirs. Initially supported by the Bolsheviks, the state existed up until March 1918, when high-ranking members of its parliament were arrested by the Bolsheviks (who had turned on the state and denounced it as bourgeois) before the official declaration of its constitution. The Soviets later set up the Tatar Autonomous Soviet Socialist Republic, which was established on 27 May 1920. The boundaries of the republic did not include a majority of the Volga Tatars. The Tatar Union of the Godless were persecuted in Joseph Stalin's 1928 purges.

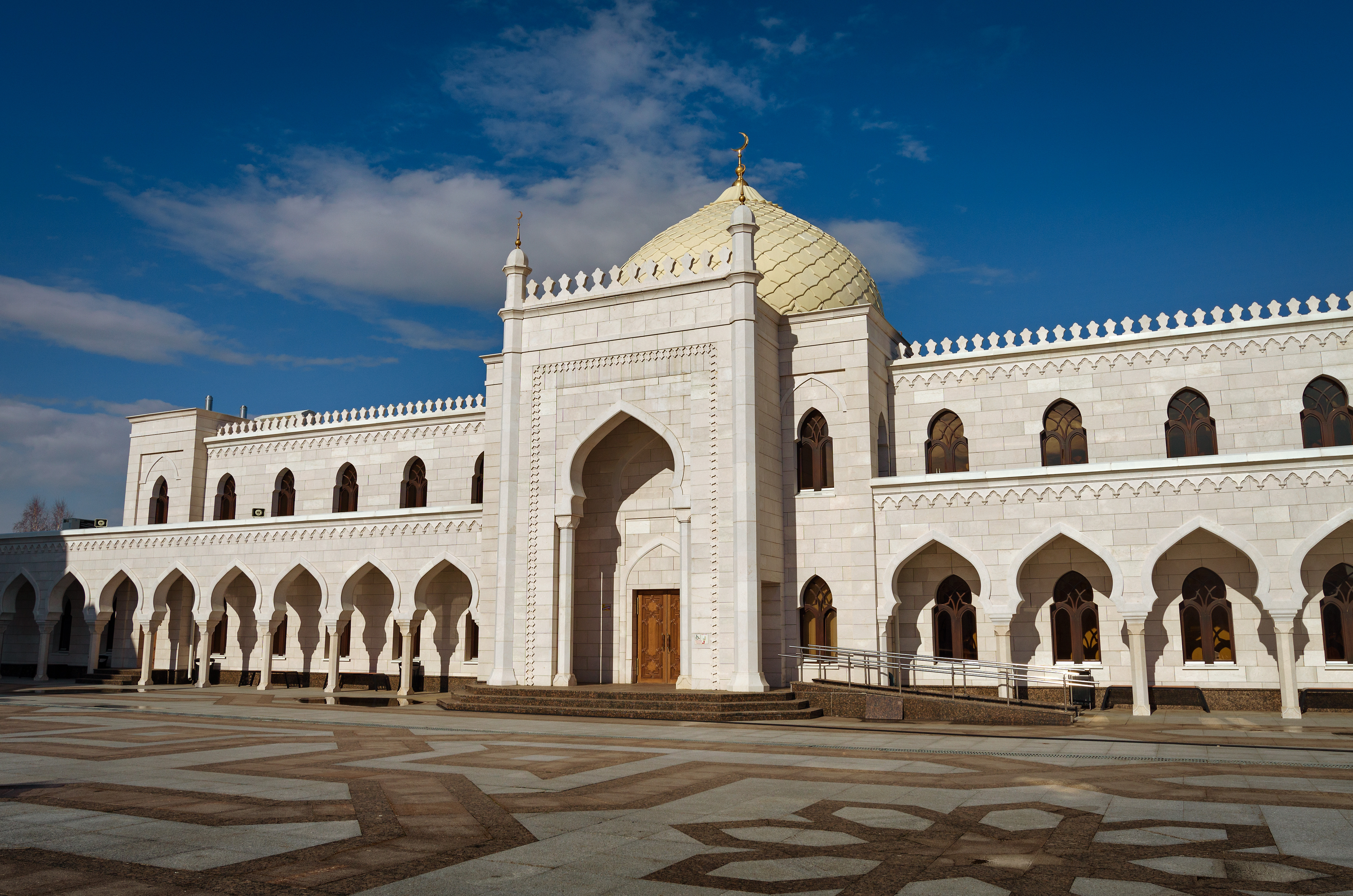
The left wing of the White Mosque

A famine occurred in the Tatar Autonomous Soviet Socialist Republic in 1921–1922 as a result of the policy of war communism. The famine deaths of between 500,000 and 2 million Tatars in the Tatar ASSR and in the Volga-Ural region in 1921–1922 was catastrophic as half of the Volga Tatar population in the USSR died.

Starting in the 1960s, schools opened in Tatarstan that taught Russian as an official second language, as it was necessary in order to individually advance in the broader Soviet society. By the 1980s, few schools still taught the Tatar language.

=== Present day ===
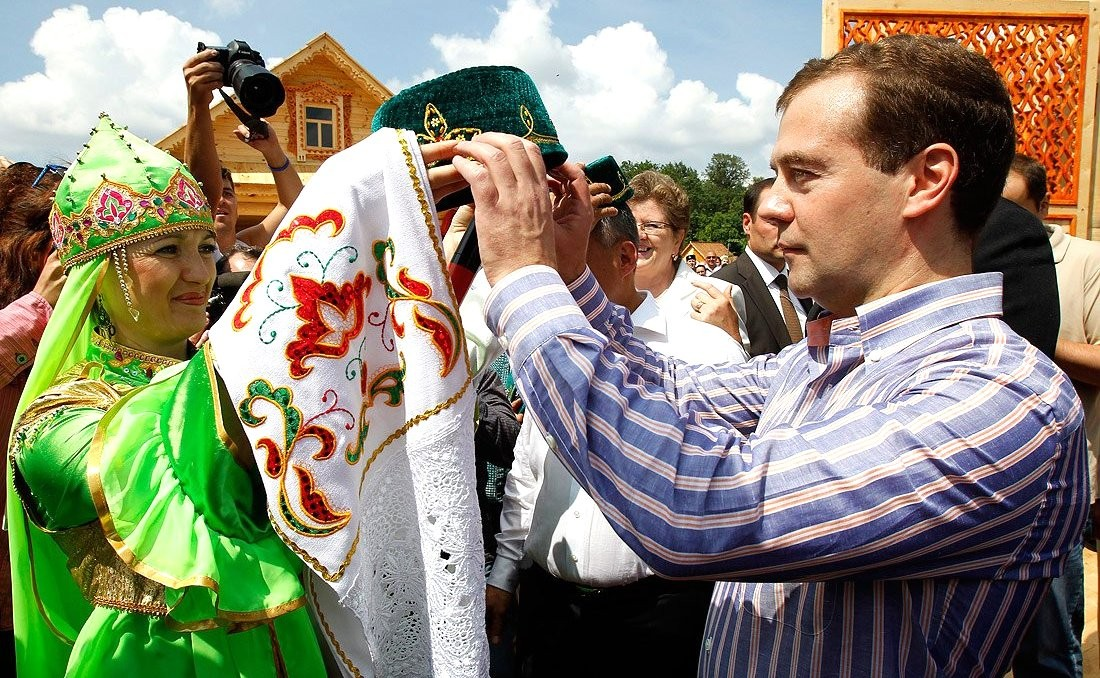
Then-Russian President Dmitry Medvedev in Tatarstan, June 2011

On 30 August 1990, Tatarstan declared its sovereignty with the Declaration on the State Sovereignty of the Tatar Soviet Socialist Republic and in 1992 Tatarstan held a referendum on the new constitution, promoted by Tatarstan's President Shaymiyev and supervised by Helsinki Commission staff. Parliament opposition revolved around the Russian faction Narodovlastie (People's Power). Some 62% of those who took part voted in favour of the constitution, with ethnic Tatars supporting it much more than Russians. In the new constitution, Tatarstan is defined as a Sovereign State. However, the referendum and constitution were declared unconstitutional by the Russian Constitutional Court. Articles 1 and 3 of the Constitution as introduced in 2002 define Tatarstan as a part of the Russian Federation, removing the "sovereignty" term.

On 15 February 1994, the Treaty On Delimitation of Jurisdictional Subjects and Mutual Delegation of Authority between the State Bodies of the Russian Federation and the State Bodies of the Republic of Tatarstan and Agreement between the Government of the Russian Federation and the Government of the Republic of Tatarstan (On Delimitation of Authority in the Sphere of Foreign Economic Relations) were signed. The power-sharing agreement was renewed on 11 July 2007, though with much of the power delegated to Tatarstan reduced.

On 20 December 2008, in response to Russia recognising Abkhazia and South Ossetia, the Mejlis of the Crimean Tatar People organisation declared Tatarstan independent and asked for United Nations recognition. However, this declaration was ignored both by the United Nations and the Russian government. On 24 July 2017, the autonomy agreement signed in 1994 between Moscow and Kazan expired, making Tatarstan the last republic of Russia to lose its special status.

== Demographics ==
Population: 4,004,809 (2021 census); 3,786,488 (2010 census); 3,779,265 (2002 census); 3,637,809 (1989 Soviet census).

=== Settlements ===
Largest cities or towns in Tatarstan 2021 Russian Census
Rank		Administrative Division	Pop.
1	Kazan	City of republic significance of Kazan	1,308,660
2	Naberezhnye Chelny	Tukayevsky District	548,434
3	Nizhnekamsk	Nizhnekamsky District	241,479
4	Zelenodolsk	Zelenodolsky District	163,512
5	Almetyevsk	Almetyevsky District	100,000
6	Bugulma	Bugulminsky District	81,677
7	Yelabuga	Yelabuzhsky District	73,630
8	Leninogorsk	Leninogorsky District	60,993
9	Chistopol	Chistopolsky District	58,815
10	Aznakayevo	Aznakayevsky District	40,739

=== Vital statistics ===
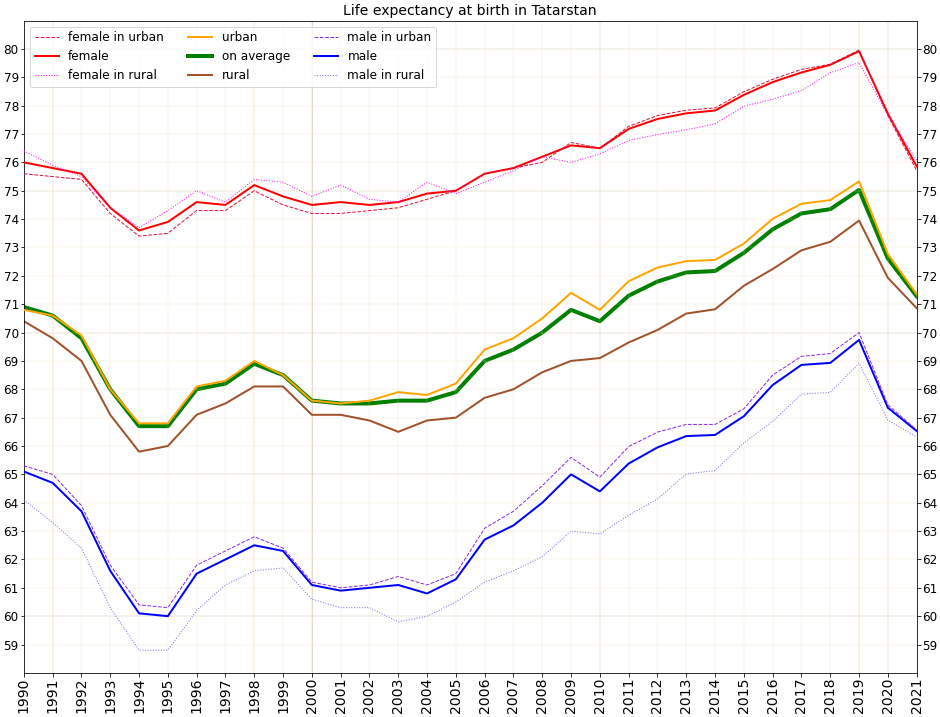
Life expectancy at birth in Tatarstan

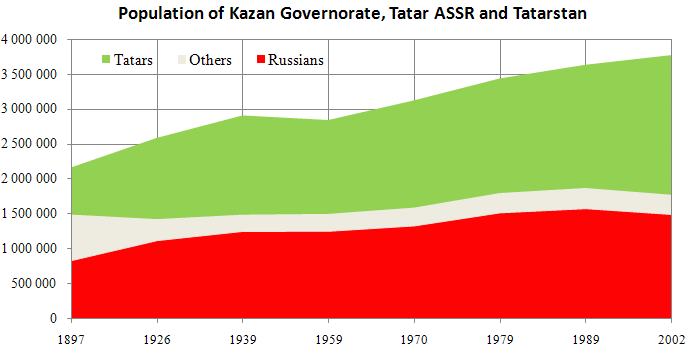
Ethnic breakdown of population

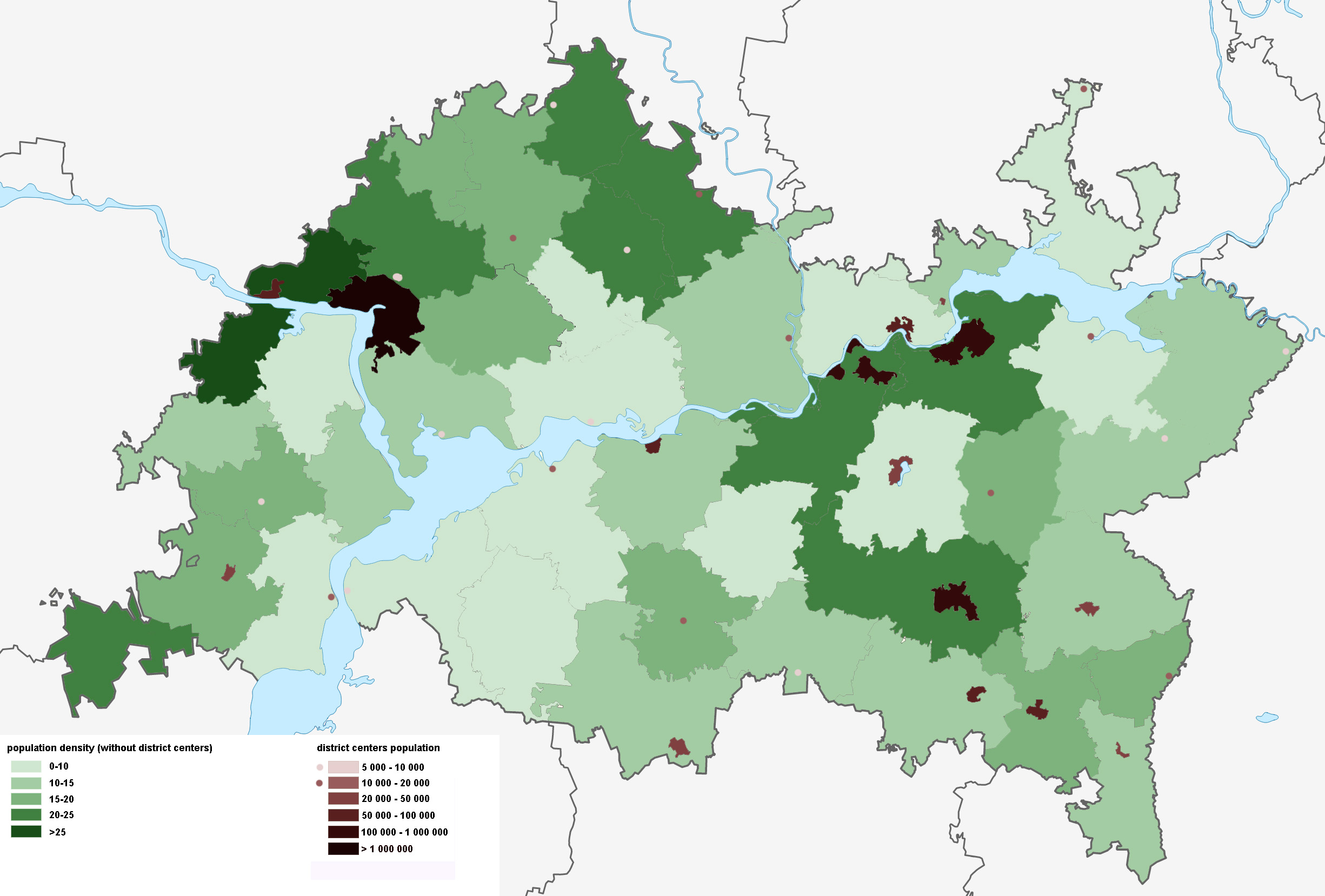
Population density

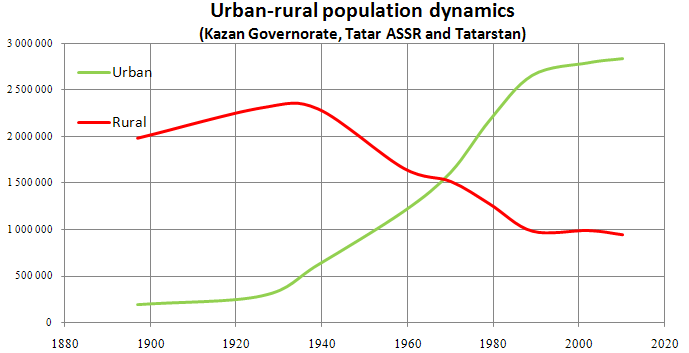
Urban-rural population dynamics

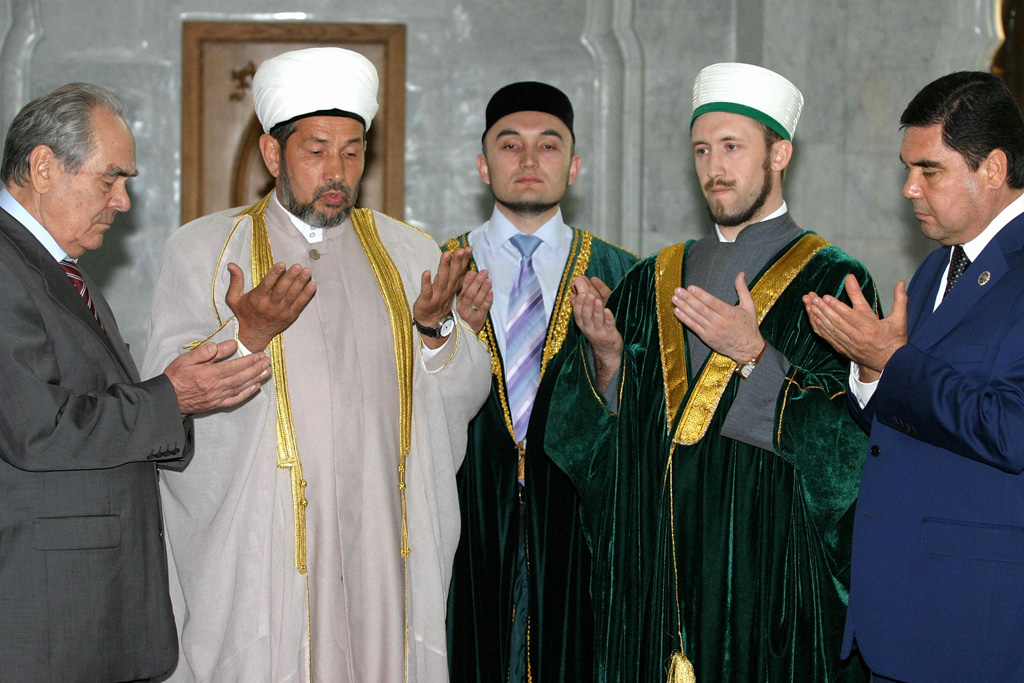
Mintimer Shaimiyev, the president of the republic of Tatarstan, in the Qolşärif Mosque, Kazan

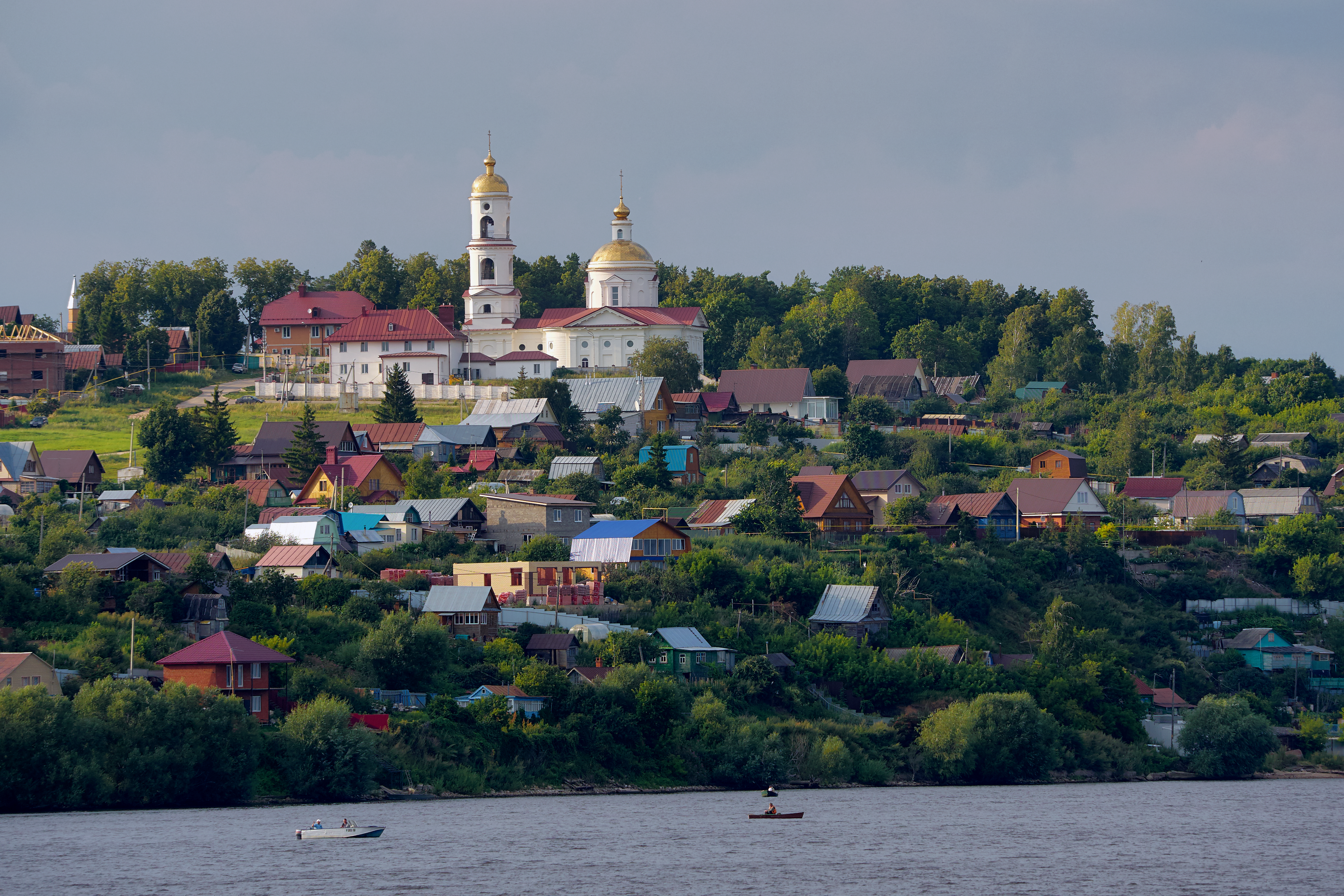
Russian Orthodox church in Tatarstan

	Average population (1000s)	Live births	Deaths	Natural change	Crude birth rate (per 1000)	Crude death rate (per 1000)	Natural change (per 1000)	Fertility rates
1970	3,146	47,817	25,622	22,195	15.2	8.1	7.1	
1975	3,311	55,095	29,686	25,409	16.6	9.0	7.7	
1980	3,465	54,272	32,758	21,514	15.7	9.5	6.2	
1985	3,530	64,067	34,622	29,445	18.1	9.8	8.3	
1990	3,665	56,277	36,219	20,058	15.4	9.9	5.5	2.05
1991	3,684	50,160	37,266	12,894	13.6	10.1	3.5	1.88
1992	3,706	44,990	39,148	5,842	12.1	10.6	1.6	1.71
1993	3,730	41,144	44,291	−3,147	11.0	11.9	−0.8	1.57
1994	3,746	41,811	48,613	−6,802	11.2	13.0	−1.8	1.58
1995	3,756	39,070	48,592	−9,522	10.4	12.9	−2.5	1.47
1996	3,766	38,080	45,731	−7,651	10.1	12.1	−2.0	1.43
1997	3,775	37,268	46,270	−9,002	9.9	12.3	−2.4	1.38
1998	3,785	37,182	45,153	−7,971	9.8	11.9	−2.1	1.37
1999	3,789	35,073	46,679	−11,606	9.3	12.3	−3.1	1.29
2000	3,788	35,446	49,723	−14,277	9.4	13.1	−3.8	1.29
2001	3,784	35,877	50,119	−14,242	9.5	13.2	−3.8	1.30
2002	3,779	38,178	51,685	−13,507	10.1	13.7	−3.6	1.37
2003	3,775	38,461	52,263	−13,802	10.2	13.8	−3.7	1.36
2004	3,771	38,661	51,322	−12,661	10.3	13.6	−3.4	1.34
2005	3,767	36,967	51,841	−14,874	9.8	13.8	−3.9	1.26
2006	3,763	37,303	49,218	−11,915	9.9	13.1	−3.2	1.25
2007	3,763	40,892	48,962	−8,070	10.9	13.0	−2.1	1.36
2008	3,772	44,290	48,952	−4,662	11.8	13.0	−1.2	1.45
2009	3,779	46,605	47,892	−1,287	12.4	12.7	−0.3	1.55
2010	3,785	48,968	49,730	−762	12.9	13.1	−0.2	1.60
2011	3,795	50,824	47,072	3,752	13.4	12.4	1.0	1.65
2012	3,813	55,421	46,358	9,063	14.5	12.2	2.3	1.80
2013	3,830	56,458	46,192	10,266	14.7	12.1	2.6	1.83
2014	3,847	56,480	46,921	9,559	14.7	12.2	2.5	1.84
2015	3,862	56,899	46,483	10,416	14.7	12.0	2.7	1.86
2016	3,878	55,853	44,894	10,959	14.4	11.6	2.8	1.86
2017	3,889	48,115	43,957	4,158	12.4	11.3	1.1	1.65
2018	3,894	46,320	44,720	1,600	11.9	11.5	0.4	1.62
2019		42,871	42,691	180	11.0	11.0	0.0	1.54
2020		41,320	54,310	-12,981	10.6	13.9	-3.3	1.54
2021		40,936	60,301	-19,365	10.5	15.5	-5.5	1.57
2022		36,651	44,784	-8,133	9.2	11.2	-2.0	1.43
2023		36,497	42,844	-6,347	9.1	10.7	-1.6	1.45

Note: TFR source.

=== Ethnic groups ===
Census year	Tatars		Russians		Chuvash		Others	
Census year	#	%	#	%	#	%	#	%
1926	1,263,383	48.7%	1,118,834	43.1%	127,330	4.9%	84,485	3.3%
1939	1,421,514	48.8%	1,250,667	42.9%	138,935	4.8%	104,161	3.6%
1959	1,345,195	47.2%	1,252,413	43.9%	143,552	5.0%	109,257	3.8%
1970	1,536,430	49.1%	1,382,738	42.4%	153,496	4.9%	112,574	3.6%
1979	1,641,603	47.6%	1,516,023	44.0%	147,088	4.3%	140,698	4.1%
1989	1,765,404	48.5%	1,575,361	43.3%	134,221	3.7%	166,756	4.6%
2002	2,000,116	52.9%	1,492,602	39.5%	126,532	3.3%	160,015	4.2%
2010	2,012,571	53.2%	1,501,369	39.7%	116,252	3.1%	150,244	4.1%
2021 (Note: 101,442 people were registered from administrative databases, and could not declare an ethnicity. It is estimated that the proportion of ethnicities in this group is the same as that of the declared group.)	2,091,175	53.6%	1,574,804	40.3%	90,474	2.3%	146,914	3.8%

Historical population
Year	Pop.	±%
1926	2,585,036	—
1959	2,850,417	+10.3%
1970	3,131,238	+9.9%
1979	3,435,644	+9.7%
1989	3,647,809	+6.2%
2002	3,779,265	+3.6%
2010	3,786,488	+0.2%
2021	4,004,809	+5.8%
2025	4,019,606	+0.4%
Sources: Census data, estimate

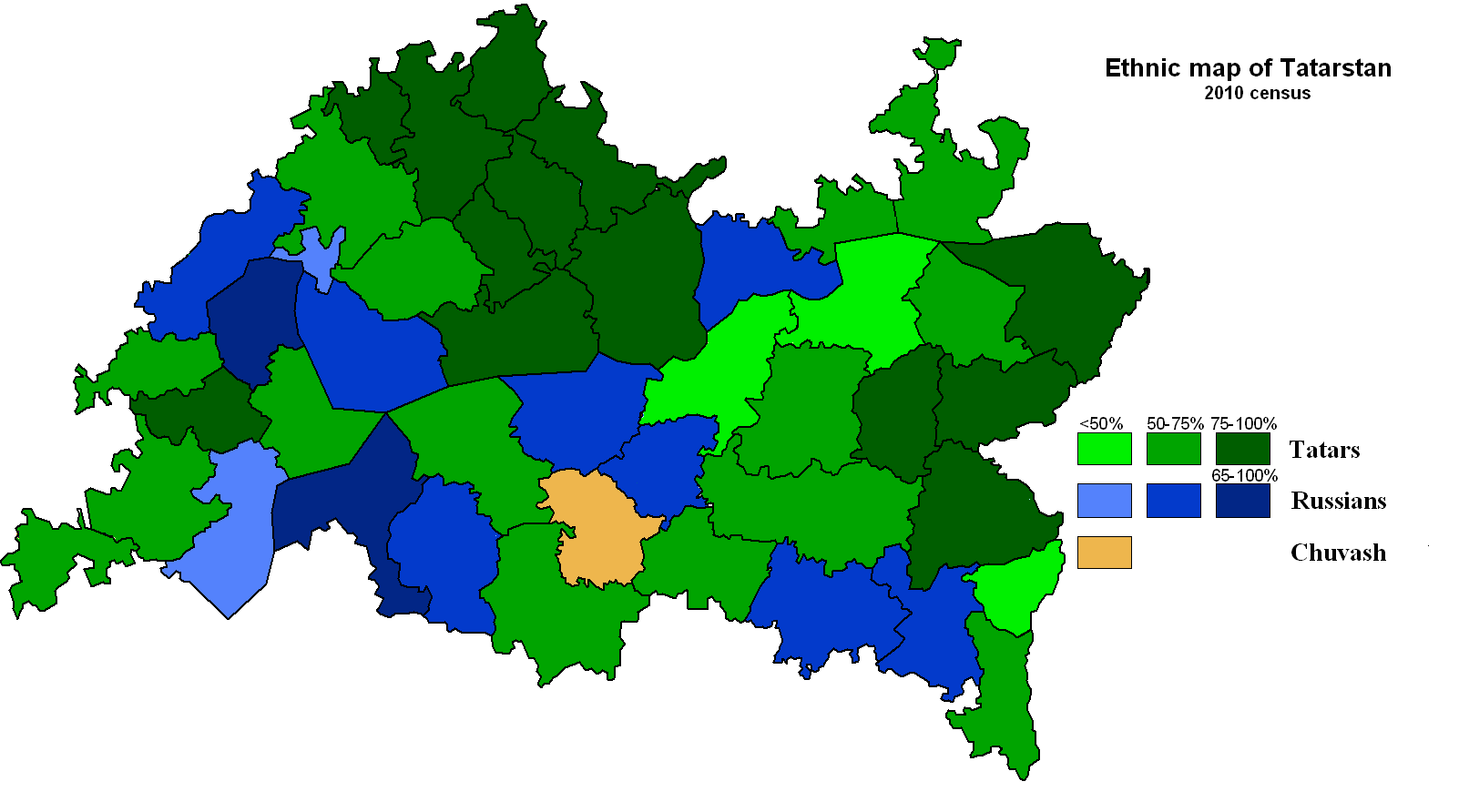
Ethnic map of Tatarstan (2010)

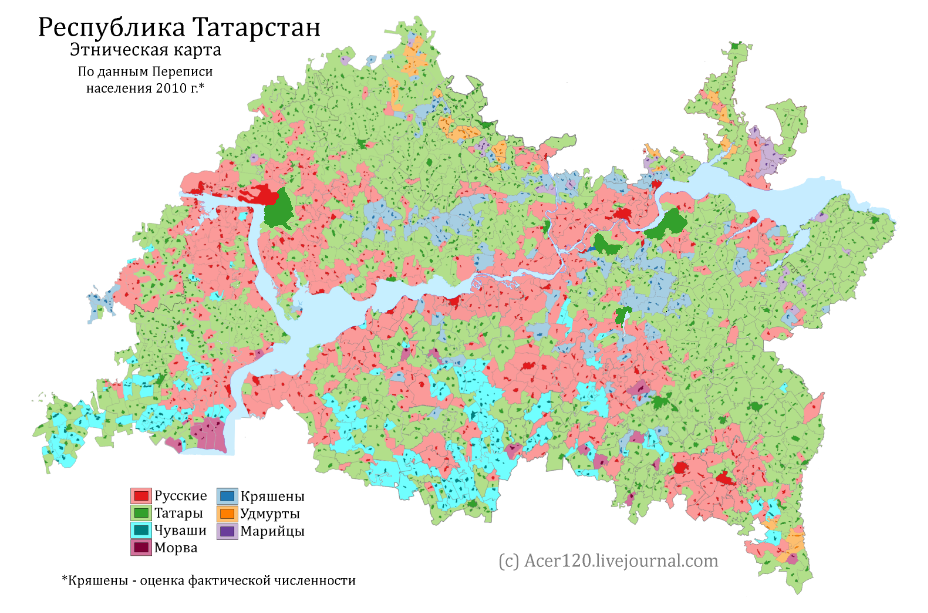
Ethnic composition of the Republic of Tatarstan by settlements, 2010 census. Russians Tatars Chuvashes Mordvins (Erzyas and Mokshas) Kryashens (Baptised Tatars) Udmurts Mari people

There are about 2 million ethnic Tatars and 1.5 million ethnic Russians in Tatarstan, along with significant numbers of Chuvash, Mari, and Udmurts, some of whom are Tatar-speaking. The Ukrainian, Mordvin, and Bashkir minorities are also significant. Most Tatars are Sunni Muslims, but a small minority known as Keräşen Tatars are Orthodox Christians, some of whom regard themselves as being distinct from other Tatars even though most Keräşen dialects differ only slightly from the Central Dialect of the Tatar language.

Despite many decades of assimilation and intermingling, some Keräşen demanded and were awarded the option of being specifically enumerated in 2002. This has provoked great controversy, however, as many intellectuals have sought to portray the Tatars as homogeneous and indivisible. Although listed separately below, the Keräşen are still included in the grand total for the Tatars. Another unique ethnic group, concentrated in Tatarstan, is the Qaratay Mordvins.

==== Jews ====
Tatar and Udmurt Jews are special territorial groups of the Ashkenazi Jews, which started to be formed in the residential areas of mixed Turkic-speaking (Tatars, Kryashens, Bashkirs, Chuvash people), Finno-Ugric-speaking (Udmurts, Mari people) and Slavic-speaking (Russians) populations. The Ashkenazi Jews first appeared in Tatarstan in the 1830s. The Jews of Udmurtia and Tatarstan are subdivided by cultural and linguistic characteristics into two territorial groups: 1) Udmurt Jews (Udmurt Jewry), who lived on the territory of Udmurtia and the north of Tatarstan; 2) Tatar Jews, or Kazan Jews (Tatar Jewry or Kazan Jewry), who lived mainly in the city of Kazan and its agglomeration.

=== Languages ===
In accordance with the Constitution of the Republic of Tatarstan, the two state languages of the republic are Tatar and Russian. According to the 2002 Russian Federal Law (On Languages of Peoples of the Russian Federation), the official script is Cyrillic. Linguistic anthropologist Dr. Suzanne Wertheim notes that "some men signal ideological devotion to the Tatar cause by refusing to accommodate to Russian-dominant public space or Russian speakers", whilst women, in promoting "the Tatar state and Tatar national culture, index their pro-Tatar ideological stances more diplomatically, and with linguistic practices situated only within the Tatar-speaking community... in keeping with normative gender roles within the Tatar republic."

=== Religion ===
Religion in Tatarstan as of 2012 (Sreda Arena Atlas)
Islam	53.8%
Russian Orthodoxy	30.5%
Atheism and irreligion	5.7%
Other Christians	2%
Other Orthodox	1%
Rodnovery and other native faiths	0.5%
Spiritual but not religious	1%
Other and undeclared	2.5%

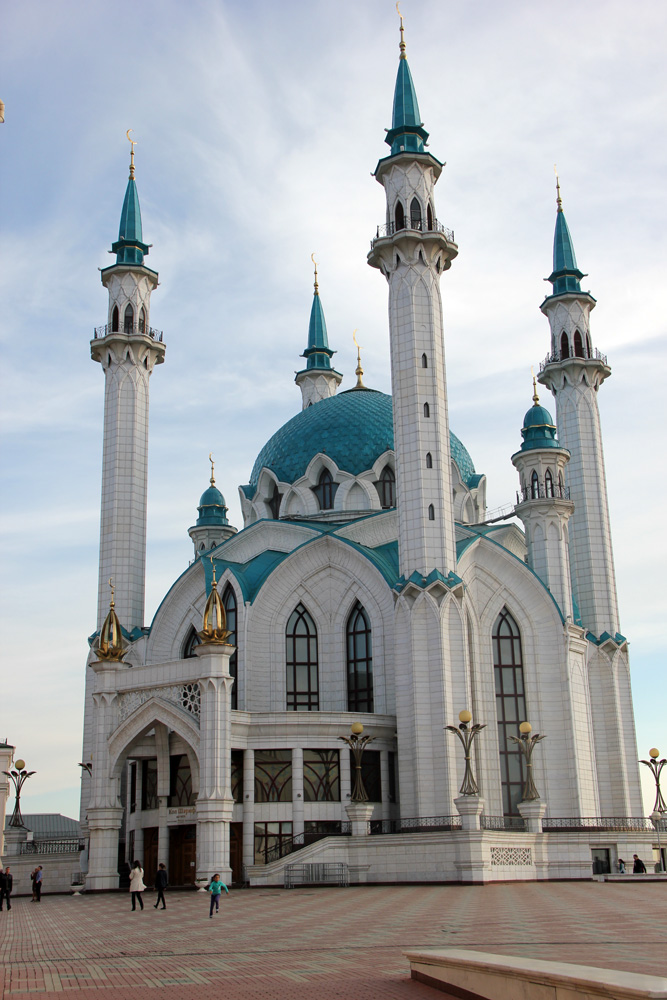
Qolşärif Mosque in Kazan

As of 2012, Islam was the most common faith in Tatarstan, adhered to by 53.8% of the estimated 3.8 million population. Most of the remaining population is either Russian Orthodox Christian or non-religious.

The muftiate of Tatarstan is the Spiritual Administration of Muslims of the Republic of Tatarstan, led by Kamil Samigullin.

Established in 922, the first Muslim state within the boundaries of modern Russia was Volga Bulgaria from which the Tatars inherited Islam. Islam was introduced by missionaries from Baghdad around the time of Ibn Fadlan's journey in 922. Islam's long presence in Russia also extends at least as far back as the conquest of the Khanate of Kazan in 1552, which brought the Tatars and Bashkirs on the Middle Volga into Russia.

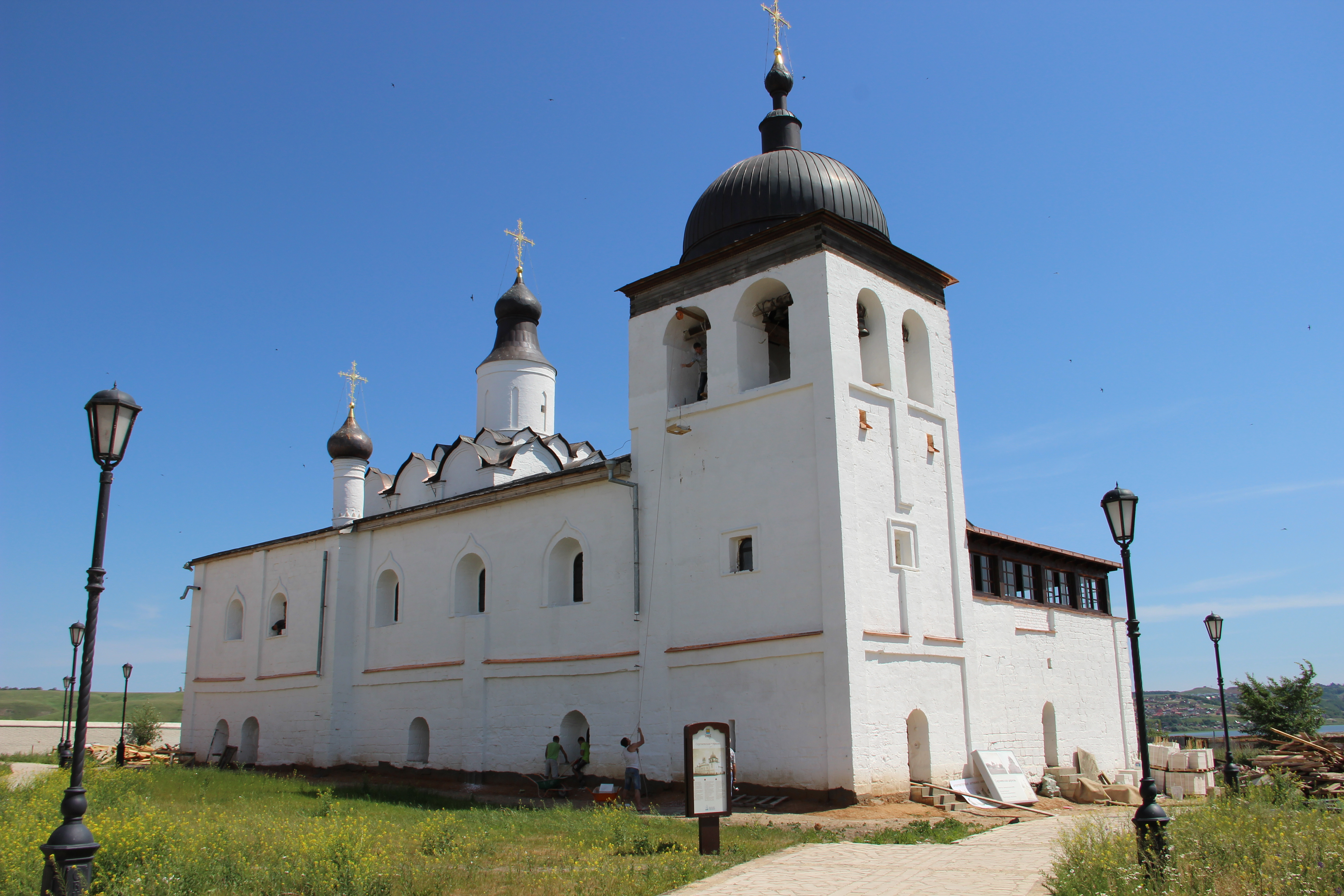
Sergius Church, at the island-city Sviyazhsk

In the 1430s, the region became independent as the base of the Khanate of Kazan, a capital having been established in Kazan, 170 km up the Volga from the ruined capital of the Bulgars. The Khanate of Kazan was conquered by the troops of Tsar Ivan IV the Terrible in the 1550s, with Kazan being taken in 1552. Some Tatars were forcibly converted to Christianity and cathedrals were built in Kazan; by 1593, mosques in the area were destroyed. The Russian government forbade the construction of mosques, a prohibition that was not lifted until the 18th century by Catherine II.

In 1990, there were only 100 mosques, but by 2004 this number had risen to well over 1,000. As of 1 January 2008, as many as 1,398 religious organizations were registered in Tatarstan, of which 1,055 were Muslim. In September 2010, Eid al-Fitr as well as 21 May, the day the Volga Bulgars embraced Islam, were made public holidays.

The Russian Orthodox Church is the second largest active religion in Tatarstan, and has been so for more than 150 years, with an estimated 1.6 million followers made up of ethnic Russians, Mordvins, Armenians, Belarusians, Mari people, Georgians, Chuvash and a number of Orthodox Tatars which together constitute 38% of the 3.8 million population of Tatarstan. On 23 August 2010, the "Orthodox monuments of Tatarstan" exhibition was held in Kazan by the Tatarstan Ministry of Culture and the Kazan Eparchy. At all public events, an Orthodox Priest is called upon along with an Islamic Mufti.

The Muslim Religious Board of Tatarstan frequently organizes activities, like the 'Islamic graffiti Contest' which was held on 20 November 2011.

==== Islamic radicalism ====
Before the 2010s, more radical versions of Islam were very rare and sporadic in Tatarstan. The most famous examples included the Ittifaq Party, whose leader Fauziya Bairamova was pro-Salafist in the 2000s. Imam Rustem Safin in Kazan was suspended for two years for his association with the pan-Islamic Hizb al-Tahrir party. A few dozen Tatars participated in the Chechen separatist wars, and in 2010 the Tatarstan Interior Ministry disbanded a short-lived formation in Nurlat district that had tried to imitate the Dagestan extremist movement of the 1990s.

A noticeable turning point was in 2012, when the Tatar mufti Valiulla Yakupov, who opposed extremism, was shot dead in Kazan. On the same day, mufti Ildus Fayzov was injured when his car was blown up. A month later, another car exploded; this time, a bomb was supposedly detonated accidentally. Inside the car, three bodies were found, along with weapons and radical Islamic literature. They were suspected of planning an attack on president Vladimir Putin, who was visiting Tatarstan. Around the same time, a demonstration by supporters of Sharia law was seen, which was “very unusual for Tatarstan”.

A 2021 George Washington University study of Islam in Russia states: “The majority of Russian Muslims feel well integrated into Russia and show similar patriotism to Orthodox citizens. They favor either traditional Sufi-influenced Islam or a more politically engaged Islam that supports Putin. In addition, there is a small but increasingly influential minority of more radical anti-Russian Salafists.”

The source of the rise of radicalism in Tatarstan is thought to be the combination of its native Tatar population feeling the desire for a more strong religious identity (which was weakened during Soviet Era), and an increased immigration from Caucasus and Central Asia.

Current mufti of Tatarstan, Kamil Samigullin has expressed the following regarding Wahhabism: "We must ban this ideology, it is misanthropic, but the counter-enforcement practice in our country does not ban ideologies, but bans specific organizations. In our country, Wahhabis represent a set of different types of structures, they are developing, evolving. After such a ban, their activities will become significantly more complicated, which will reduce the influx of people into the terrorist underground".

== Politics ==
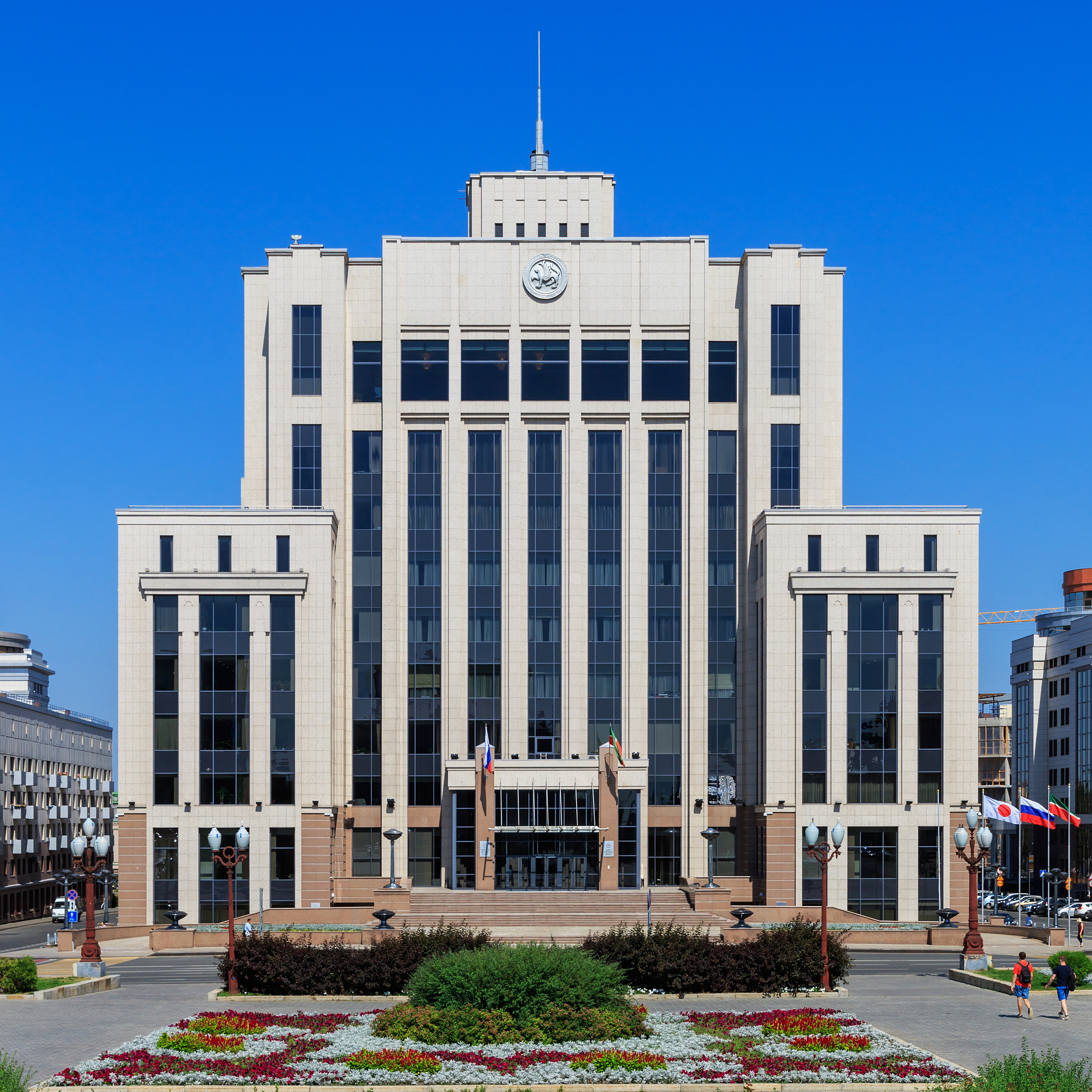
Cabinet of Ministers building

Tatarstan's unicameral legislature, the State Council, consists of 100 seats: 50 are elected in party lists and 50 by single-member constituencies. The chairman of the State Council is Farit Mukhametshin, who has served since 27 May 1998. The government is the Сabinet of Ministers. The prime minister of the Republic of Tatarstan is Alexey Pesoshin.

According to the Constitution of the Republic of Tatarstan, the head of the republic (known as rais) can be elected only by the people of Tatarstan, but due to Russian federal law, this law was suspended for an indefinite term. The Russian law on the election of governors says they should be elected by regional parliaments and that the candidate for Rais can be presented only by the president of Russia.

In December 2022, regional lawmakers voted to change the title of the head of the republic from president to rais (an Arabic title for "leader"); lawmakers were expected to adopt new amendments to Tatarstan's constitution so that it would be in line with the 2020 constitutional amendments and a federal law in 2021 that abolished regional presidencies. The title of president was seen as the last remaining symbol of federalism following the centralisation reforms under Vladimir Putin. Incumbent president Rustam Minnikhanov originally was to retain the title of president until his term expires in 2025 under transitional agreements; however, he became rais (head) in February 2024.

=== Political status ===
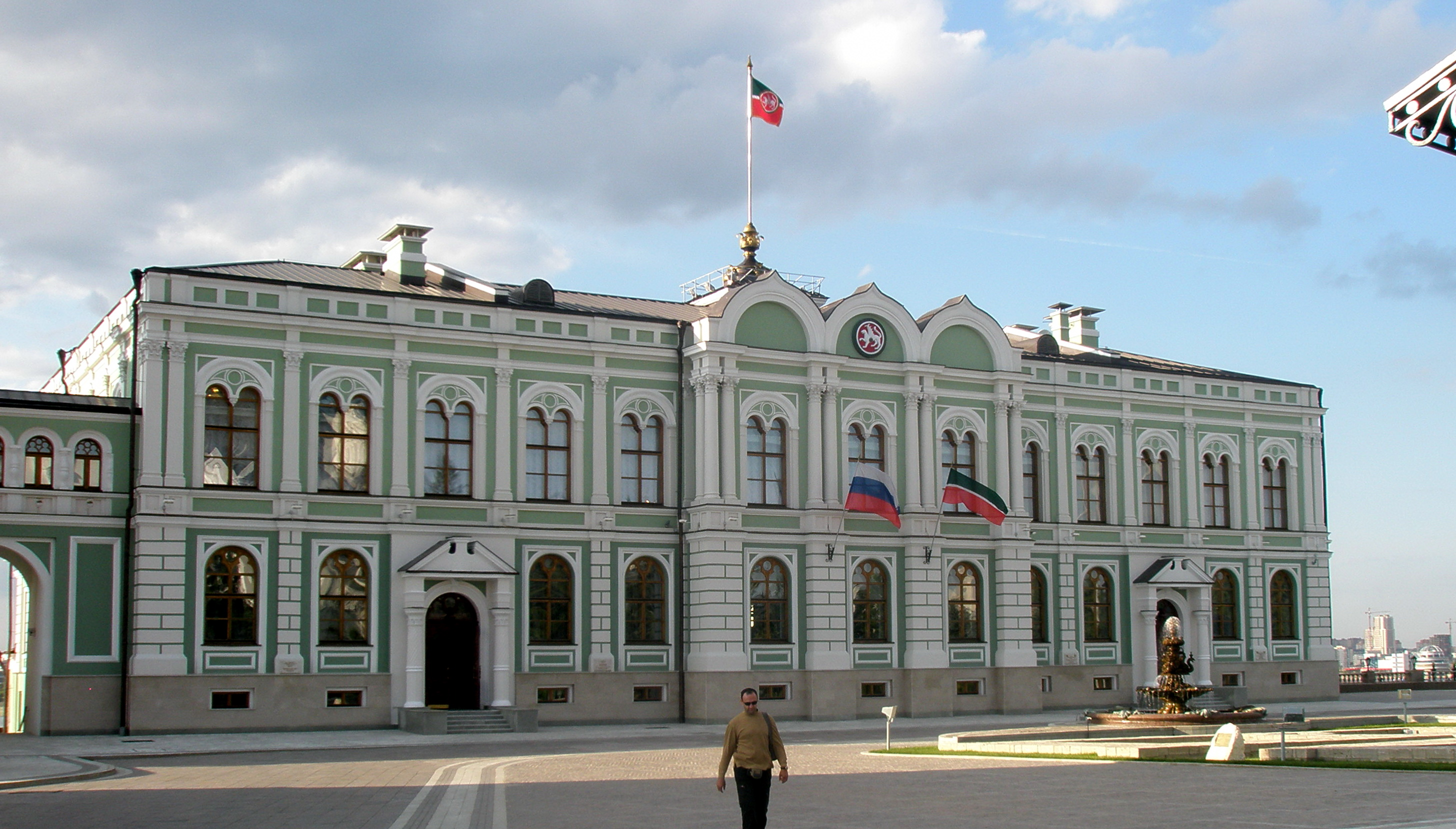
Presidential Palace

The Republic of Tatarstan is a constituent republic of the Russian Federation. Most of the Russian federal subjects are tied with the Russian federal government by the uniform Federal Treaty (The contract expired in 2017), but relations between the government of Tatarstan and the Russian federal government are more complex and are precisely defined in the Constitution of the Republic of Tatarstan. The following passage from the Constitution defines the republic's status without contradicting the Constitution of the Russian Federation:

The Republic of Tatarstan is a democratic state governed by the rule of law within the Russian Federation. The statehood of the Republic of Tatarstan is expressed in its possession of the full extent of state power outside the purview of the Russian Federation and the powers of the Russian Federation on matters of joint jurisdiction of the Russian Federation and the Republic of Tatarstan; in its possession of its own territory, population, system of state authorities, its own Constitution and legislation, state languages, and state symbols.

=== Relations with Islamic world ===
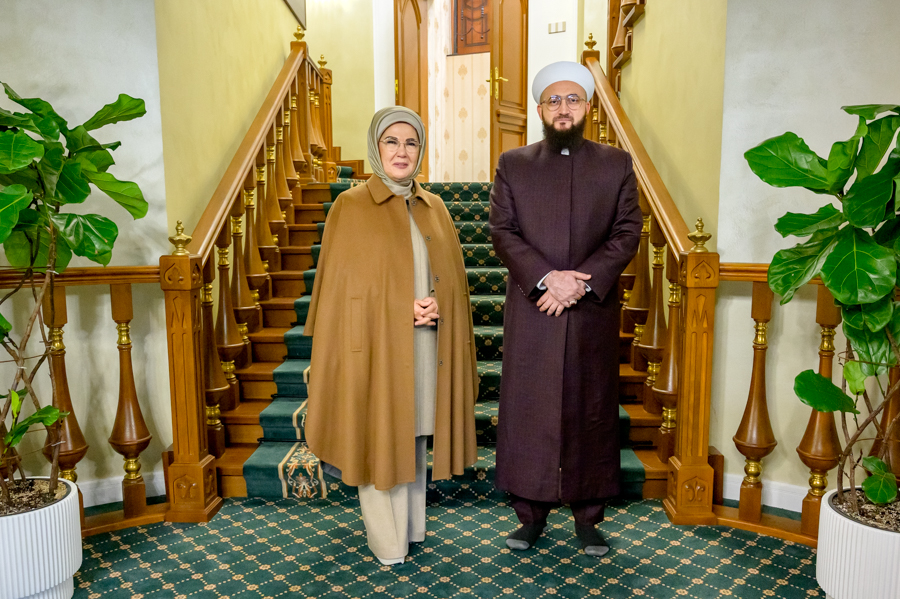
Emine Erdoğan visiting the Mərcani mosque in Kazan, Tatarstan. With her is the Mufti of Tatarstan, Kamil Səmiğullin (2024).

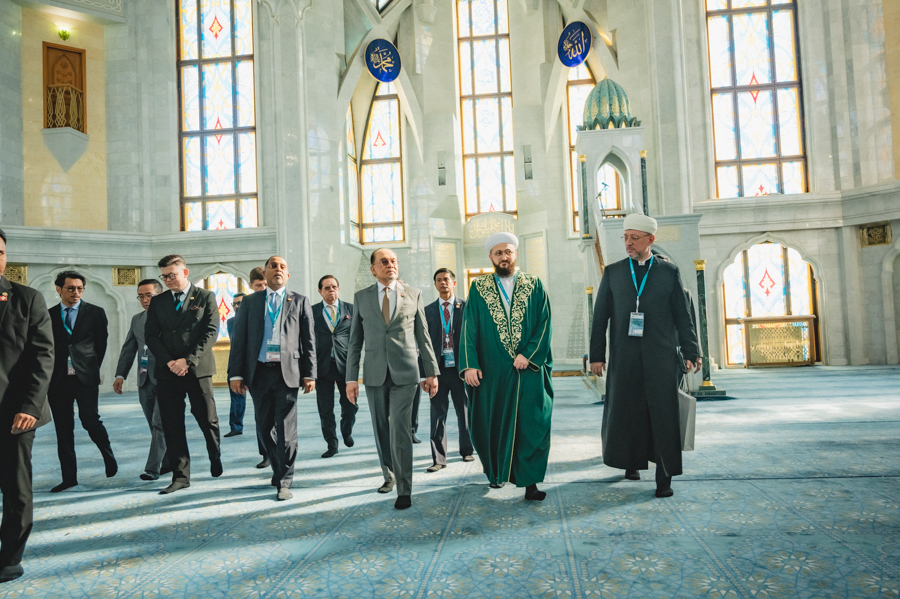
Anwar Ibrahim, the prime minister of Malaysia, visiting the Kul Sharif mosque in Kazan (2025).

The Republic of Tatarstan is actively involved in the affairs of the Islamic world. For example, relations with Turkey are significant. This is reflected in the "Strategic Cooperation between Turkey and Tatarstan" category on the website of the head of Tatarstan. According to Minnikhanov, "Turkish companies have invested two billion US dollars in our republic. Today (2017) 10 Turkish factories are successfully operating in Tatarstan. The connections between Tatarstan and Turkey serve as a link between Turkey and Moscow." Erdoğan has emphasized the close connection between Tatars and Turks.

Cooperation between Tatarstan and Iran has also been highlighted. In 2022, Minnikhanov stated that "we have rich historical, economic and cultural ties, as well as a long experience of cooperation". Iran's ambassador to Russia, Kazem Jalali, called Tatarstan “a brother [of Iran]”, and hoped for even closer cooperation between them.

In 2022, Hamas leader Isma’il Haniyya visited Kazan. The meeting "discussed issues of interaction through the Russia-Islamic World Organization, which Minnikhanov has headed since 2014". According to Minnokhanov, they work closely with their Palestinian colleagues. In 2010, Palestinian President Mahmoud Abbas also visited Kazan, and during his visit described Tatarstan as “the cradle of Islam”. Since the start of the Gaza War, Tatarstan has sent humanitarian aid to the region. Mufti of Tatarstan, Kamil Samigullin expressed his support for the Palestinians in November 2023, accusing the "collective West" of complicity in genocide.

Kazan Forum is a "platform for economic cooperation between the Russian Federation and the countries of the Islamic world". During the 2025 forum, president Vladimir Putin stated that "Tatarstan is one of the regions of the Russian Federation that is most actively building such fruitful and constructive relationships".

According to the researcher Giuliano Bifolchi: "Tatarstan’s location within Russia is strategically important, serving as a vital link to Central Asia and the Muslim world. Its Turkic and Islamic identity, historical pursuit of autonomy, and high industrialisation provide it with distinct leverage. While the republic does not advocate separation, it constitutes a sensitive point within Russia’s internal structure, where issues of identity, political control, and foreign policy intersect. Its role in hosting international forums serves both federal foreign policy goals and local aspirations for international recognition".

== Economy ==
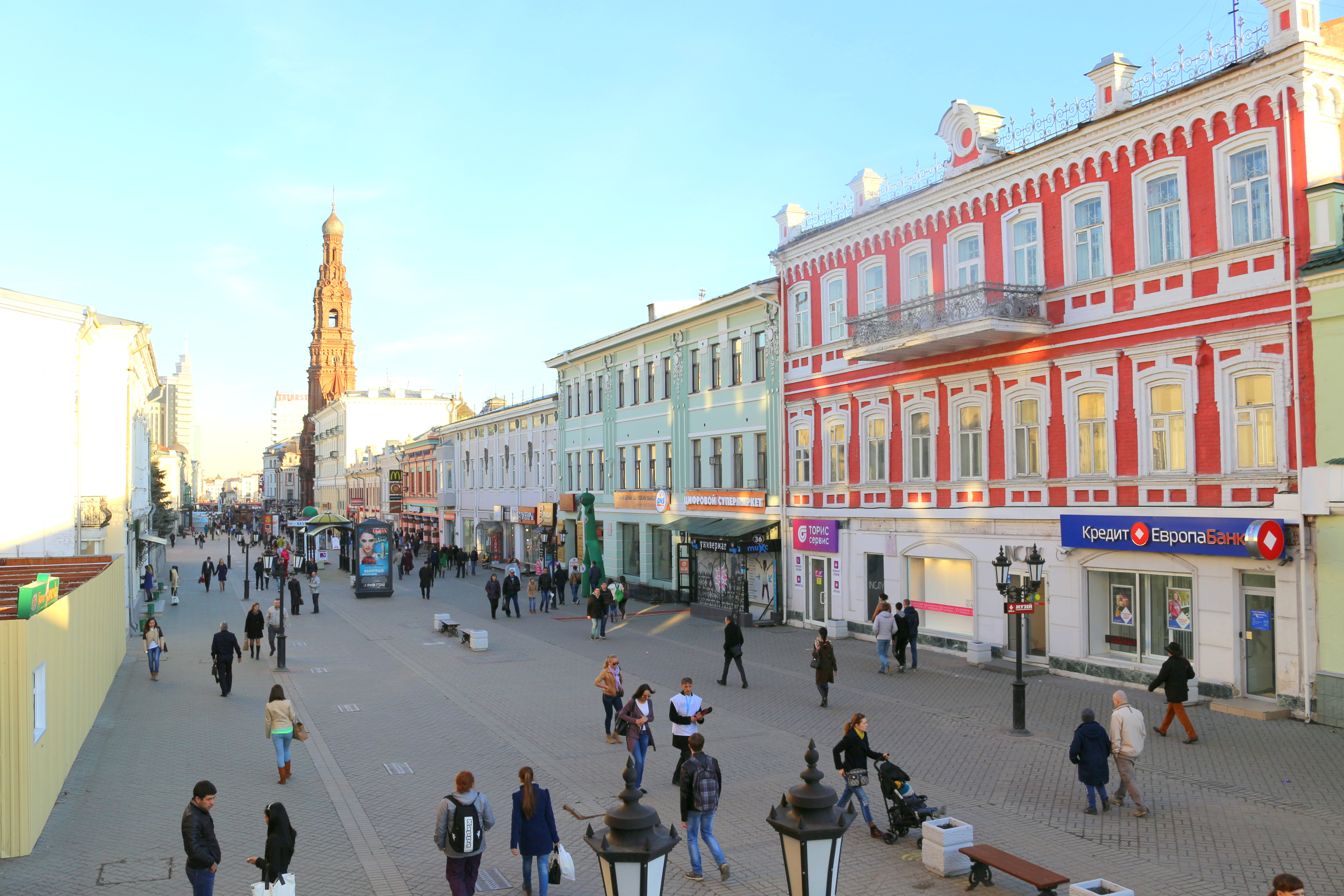
Bauman street in Kazan

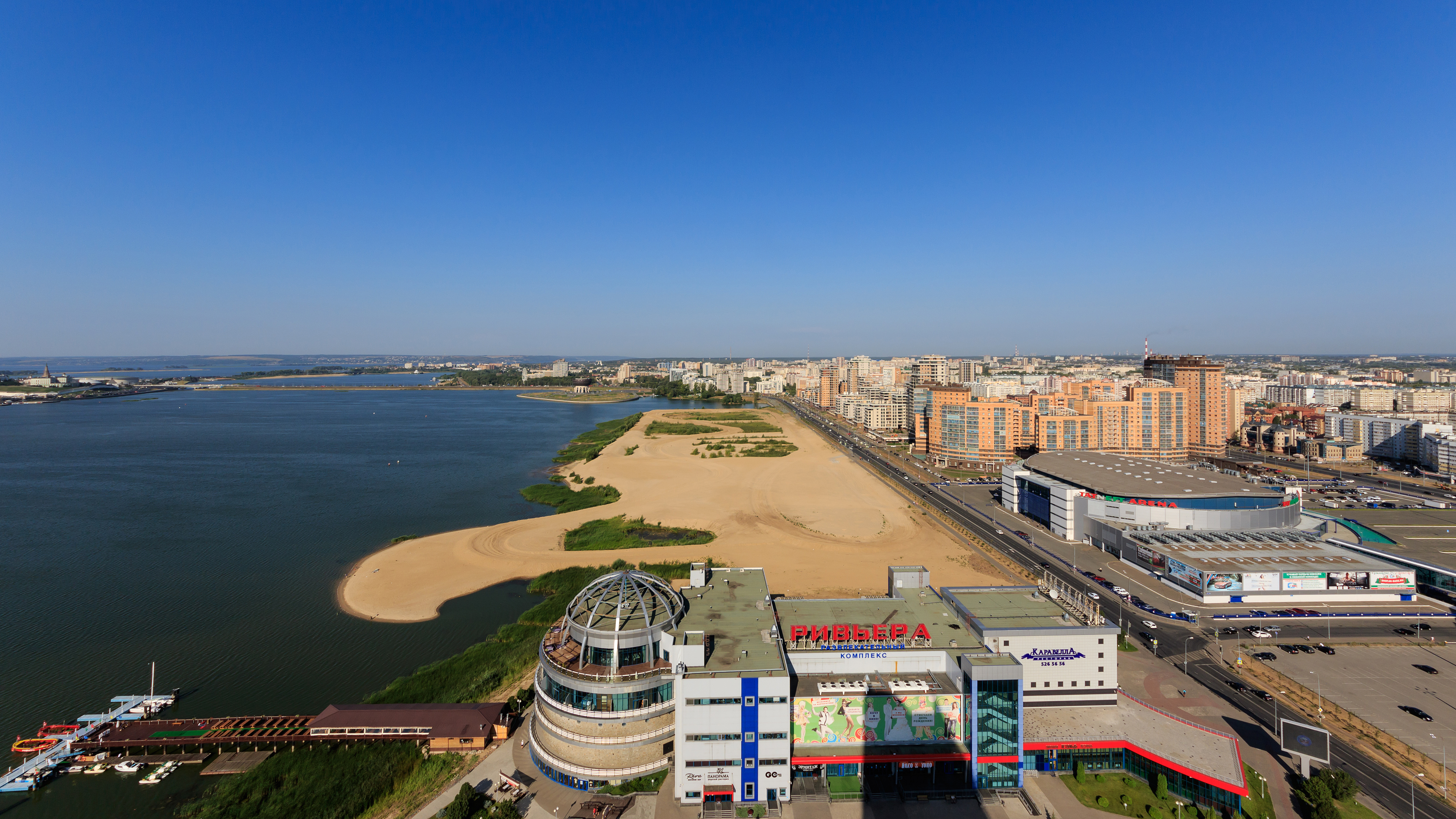
A neighbourhood in Kazan

Tatarstan is one of the most economically developed regions of Russia. The republic is highly industrialised and ranks second to Samara Oblast in terms of industrial production per km^{2}.

In 2021, Tatarstan's gross regional product was €40 billion, while GRP per capita was €10,000.

The region's main source of wealth is oil. Tatarstan produces 32 million tonnes of crude oil per year and has estimated oil reserves of more than 1 billion tons. Industrial production constitutes 45% of the Republic's gross regional domestic product. The most developed manufacturing industries are petrochemical industry and machine building. The truck-maker KamAZ is the region's largest enterprise and employs about one-fifth of Tatarstan's workforce. Kazanorgsintez, based in Kazan, is one of Russia's largest chemical companies. Tatarstan's aviation industry produces Tu-214 passenger airplanes and helicopters. The Kazan Helicopter Plant is one of the largest helicopter manufacturers in the world. Engineering, textiles, clothing, wood processing, and food industries are also of key significance in Tatarstan.

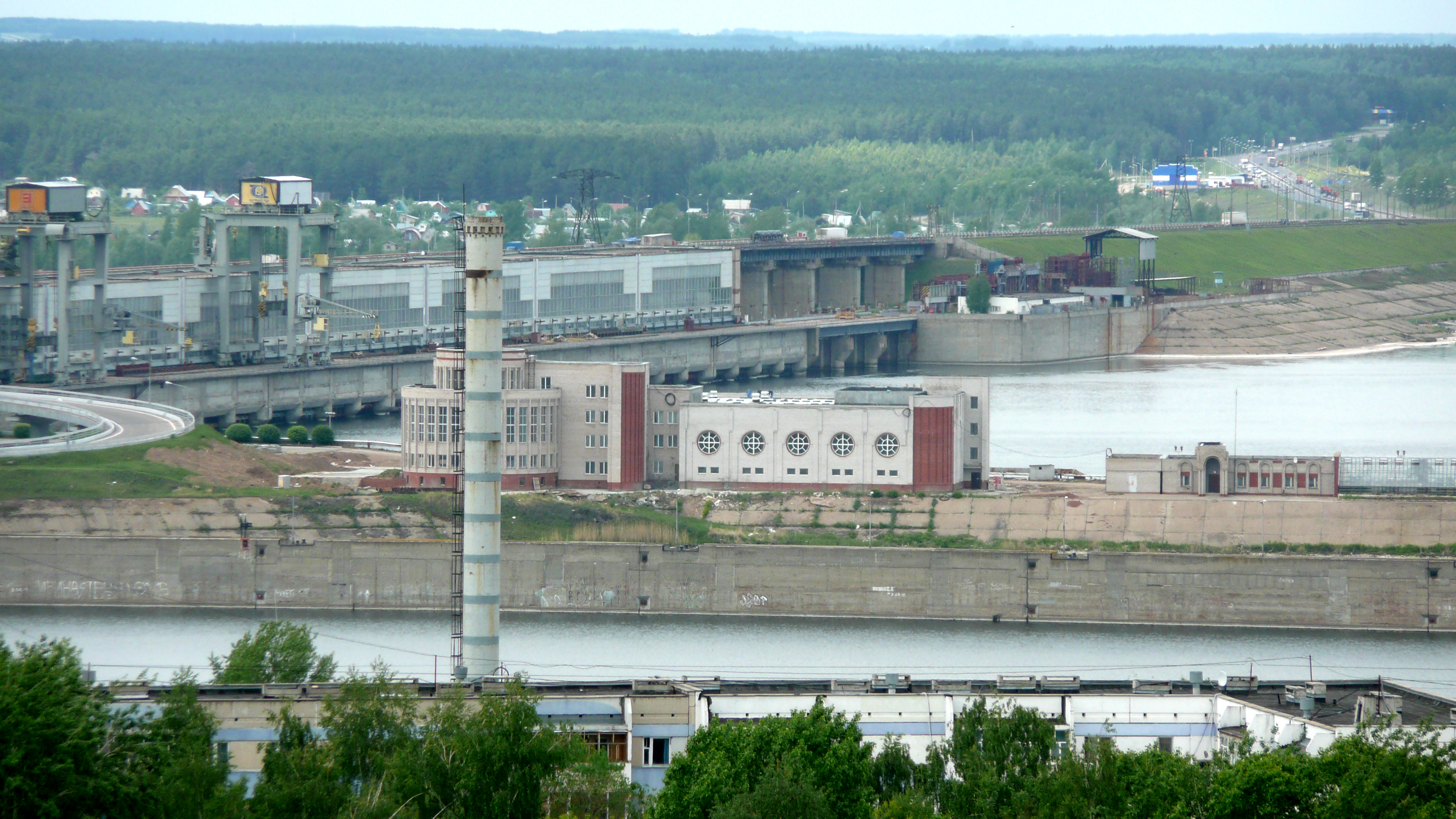
Hydroelectric power station in Naberezhnye Chelny

Tatarstan consists of three distinct industrial regions. The northwestern part is an old industrial region where engineering, chemical, and light industry dominate. In the newly industrial northeast region with its core in the Naberezhnye Chelny–Nizhnekamsk agglomeration, major industries are automobile construction, the chemical industry, and power engineering. The southeast region has oil production with engineering under development. The north, central, south, and southwest parts of the republic are rural regions. The republic has huge water resources—the annual flow of rivers of the Republic exceeds 240 billion m^{3} (8.5 trillion cu ft). Soils are widely diverse, with fertile soils covering approximately one-third of the territory that contribute to successful agricultural production. The main agricultural exports from Tatarstan are wheat, barley, and peas. Due to the high development of agriculture in Tatarstan (it contributes 5.1% of the total revenue of the republic), forests occupy only 16% of its territory. The agricultural sector of the economy is represented mostly by large companies as Ak Bars Holding and "Krasnyi Vostok Agro".

PJSC Tattelecom operates in Tatarstan, a multiservice telecommunications operator in the Republic of Tatarstan, aimed at various consumers: individuals, small, medium and large businesses, government authorities and municipalities, as well as other telecom operators. The company provides broadband Internet access, mobile and fixed telephony ("Letay"), cable TV, IP intercom, video surveillance, etc.

The republic has a highly developed transport network. It mainly comprises highways, railway lines, four navigable rivers — Volga (İdel), Kama (Çulman), Vyatka (Noqrat) and Belaya (Ağidel), and oil pipelines and airlines. The territory of Tatarstan is crossed by the main gas pipelines carrying natural gas from Urengoy and Yamburg to the west and the major oil pipelines supplying oil to various cities in the European part of Russia.

== Tourism ==
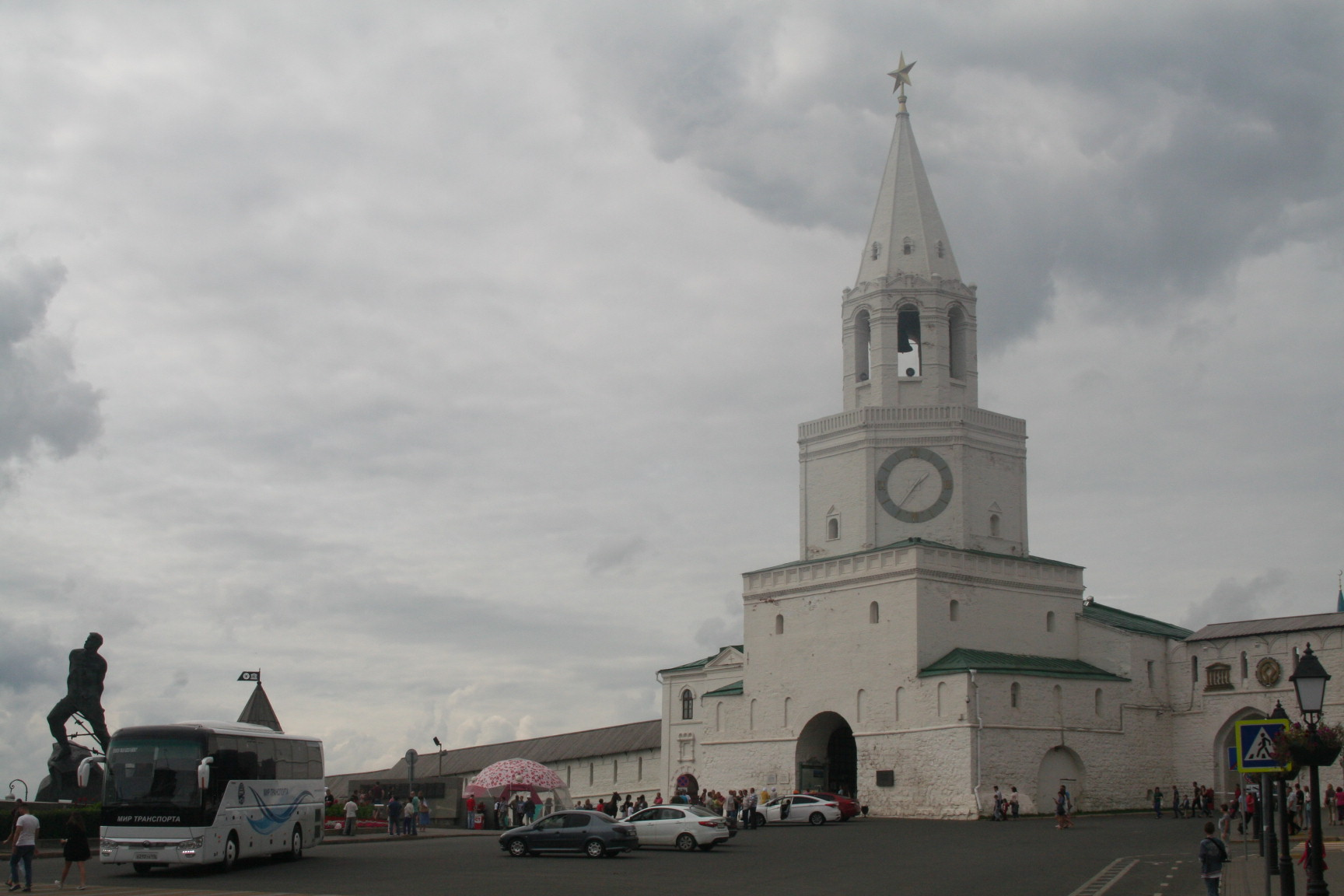
Kazan Kremlin

There are three UNESCO world heritage sites in Tatarstan—Kazan Kremlin, Bulgarian State Museum-Reserve, and Assumption Cathedral and Monastery of the town-island of Sviyazhsk.

The annual growth rate of tourist flow to the republic is on average 13.5%; the growth rate of the volume of services in the tourism sector is 17.0%.

At the end of 2016, on the territory of the Republic of Tatarstan there were 104 tour operators, of which 32 dealt in domestic tourism, 65 in domestic and inbound tourism, 1 in domestic and outbound tourism, and 6 in all three.

As of 1 January 2017, 404 collective accommodation facilities (CSR) operate in the Republic of Tatarstan; 379 CSR are subject to classification (183 in Kazan, 196 in other municipalities of the Republic of Tatarstan). 334 collective accommodation facilities received the certificate of assignment of the category, which is 88.1% of the total number of operating.

In 2016, special attention was paid to the development of tourist centres of the Republic of Tatarstan—Kazan, Bolghar, the town-island of Sviyazhsk, Yelabuga, Chistopol, and Tetyushi. The growth of tourist flow in the main tourist centres of the Republic compared to 2015 amounted to an average of 45.9%.

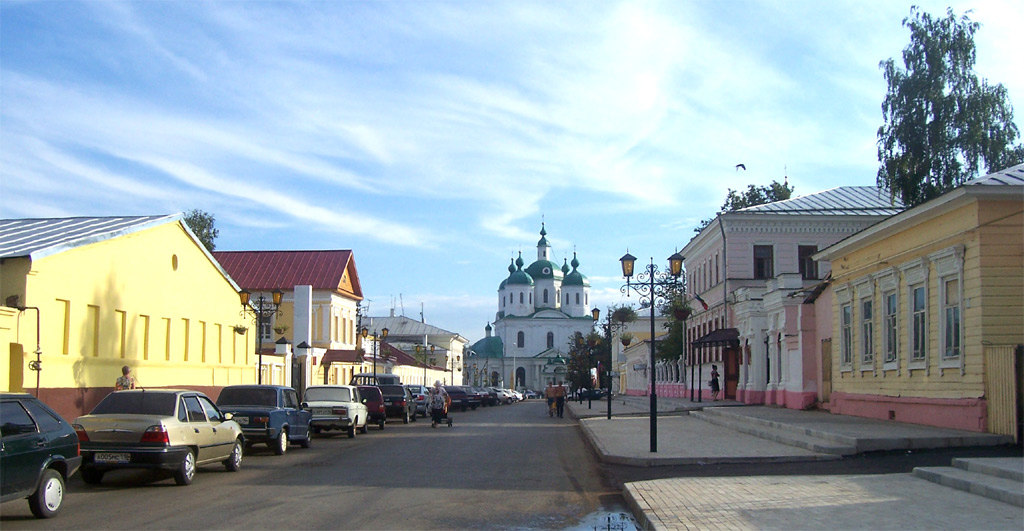
Spasskaya

Currently, sanatorium and resort recreation is developing rapidly in Tatarstan. There are 46 sanatorium-resort institutions in the Republic of Tatarstan. The capacity of the objects of the sanatorium-resort complex of Tatarstan is 8847 beds; more than 4300 specialists are engaged in the service of residents. In 2016, more than 160 thousand people rested in the health resorts of the Republic of Tatarstan. 22 health resort institutions of the Republic of Tatarstan are members of the Association of health resort institutions "Health resorts of Tatarstan," including 11 sanatoriums of PJSC "Tatneft."

Since 2016, the Republic of Tatarstan has been operating the Visit Tatarstan program, the official tourism brand of the Republic, the purpose of which is to inform tourists, monitor the reputation of the Republic, develop the tourism potential of the regions of Tatarstan, conduct market research, create partner projects with local companies, and expand internationally. "Tatarstan: 1001 pleasure" is the main message that tourists receive. The Visit Tatar website, where there is information about the main sights and recreation in Tatarstan, is available in 8 languages: Tatar, Russian, English, Chinese, German, Spanish, Finnish, and Persian.

=== Tourist resources of historical and cultural significance ===
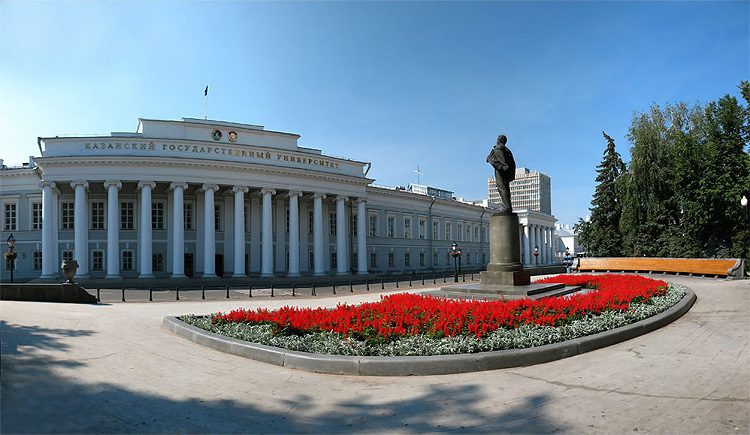
Kazan Federal University

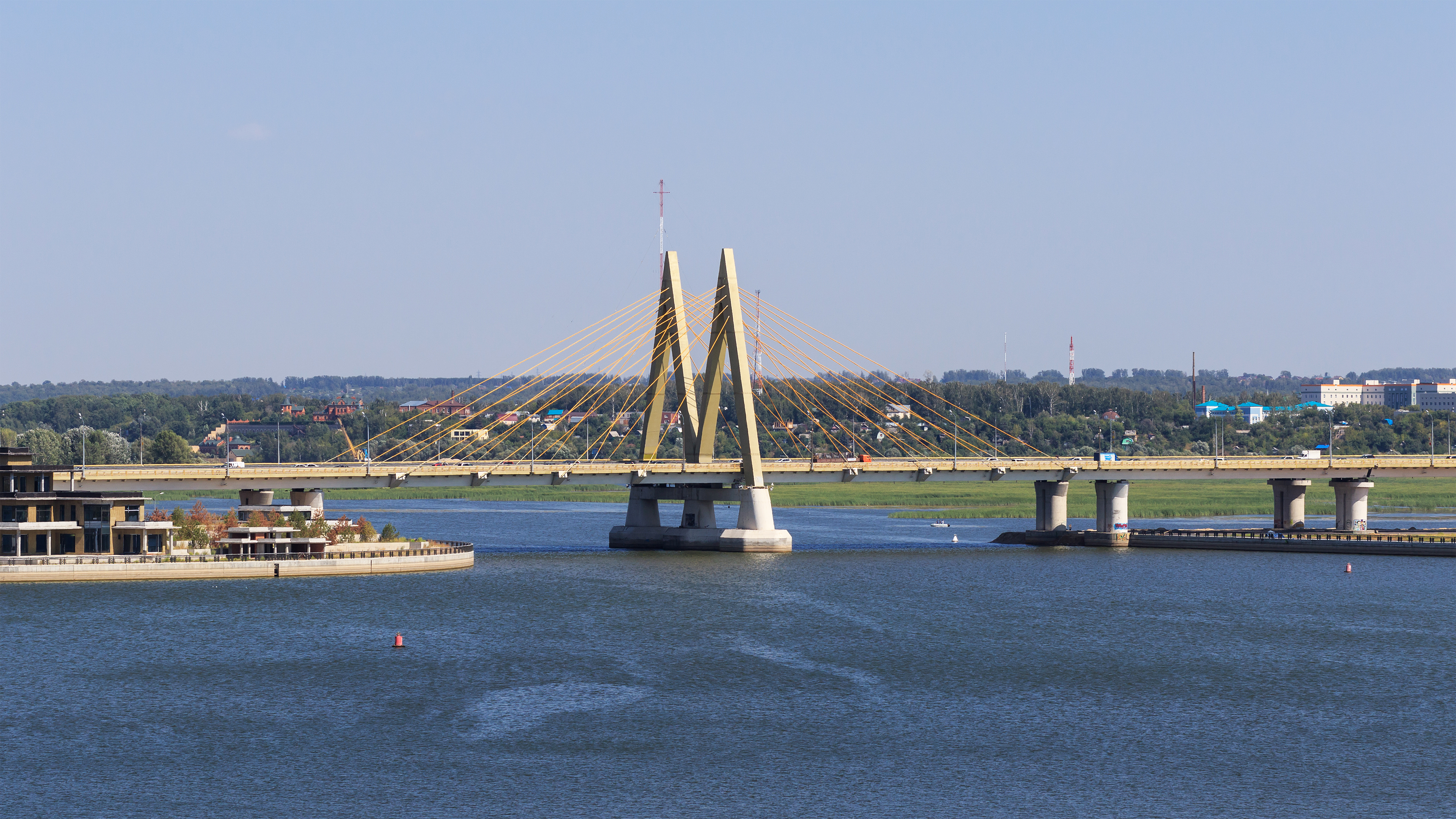
Kazan Millennium Bridge

- Kazan Kremlin
- Kazan University
- Bolghar
- Sviyazhsk
- Temple of All Religions
- Qolşärif Mosque
- Saints Peter and Paul Cathedral
- Söyembikä Tower
- Millennium Bridge
- Old Tatar Quarter
- Galiaskar Kamal Tatar Academic Theatre
- The Jalil Opera and Ballet Theatre
- The National Museum of Tatarstan

== Culture ==
Due to Islamic rules on artistic depictions, Tatars developed a uniquely geometric artistry, of which the craft of leather mosaic is a staple. They also observe certain pre-Islamic holidays, such as Sabantuy, which celebrates "the completion of spring sowing works."

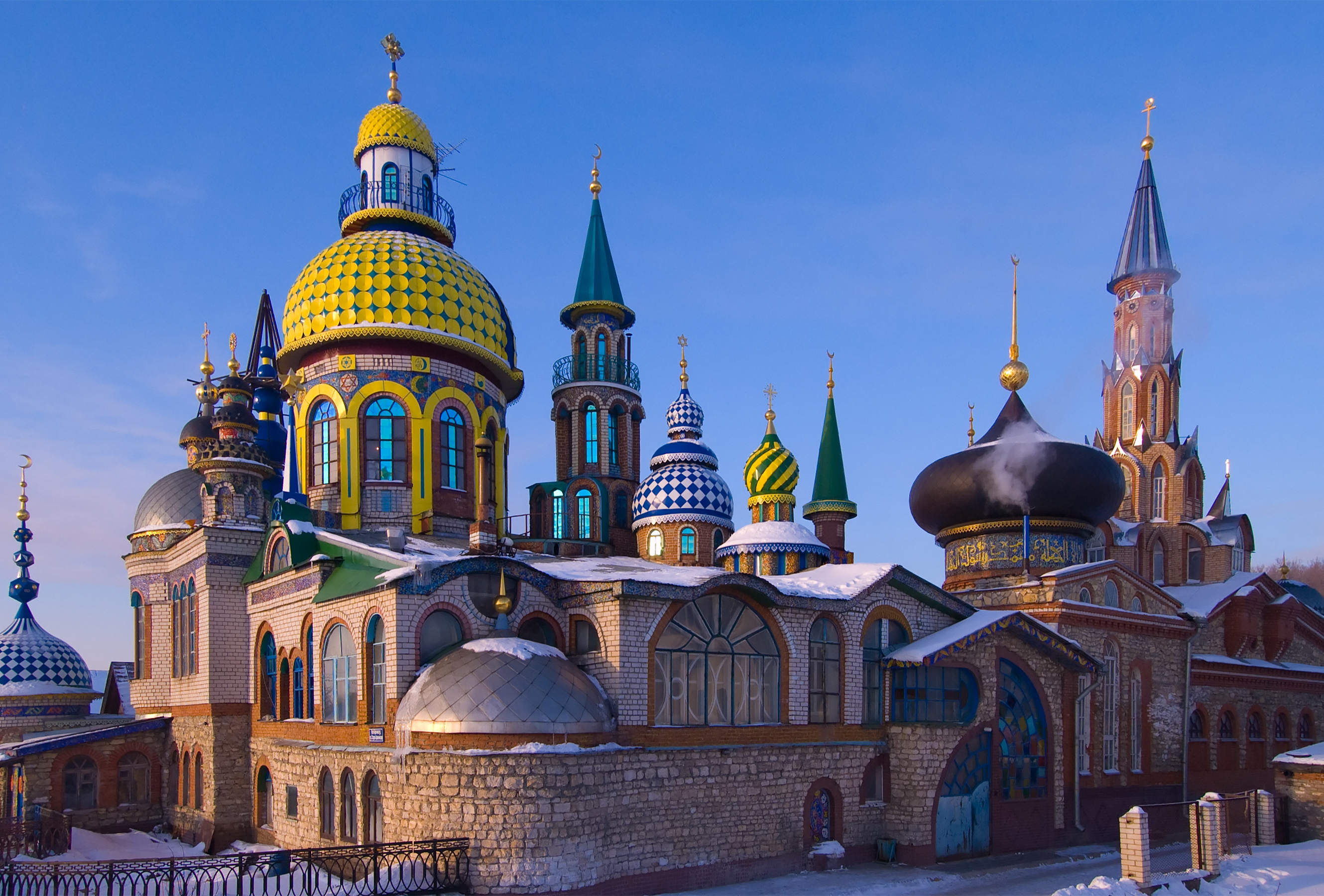
All Religions Temple, a building and cultural centre built by the local artist Ildar Khanov

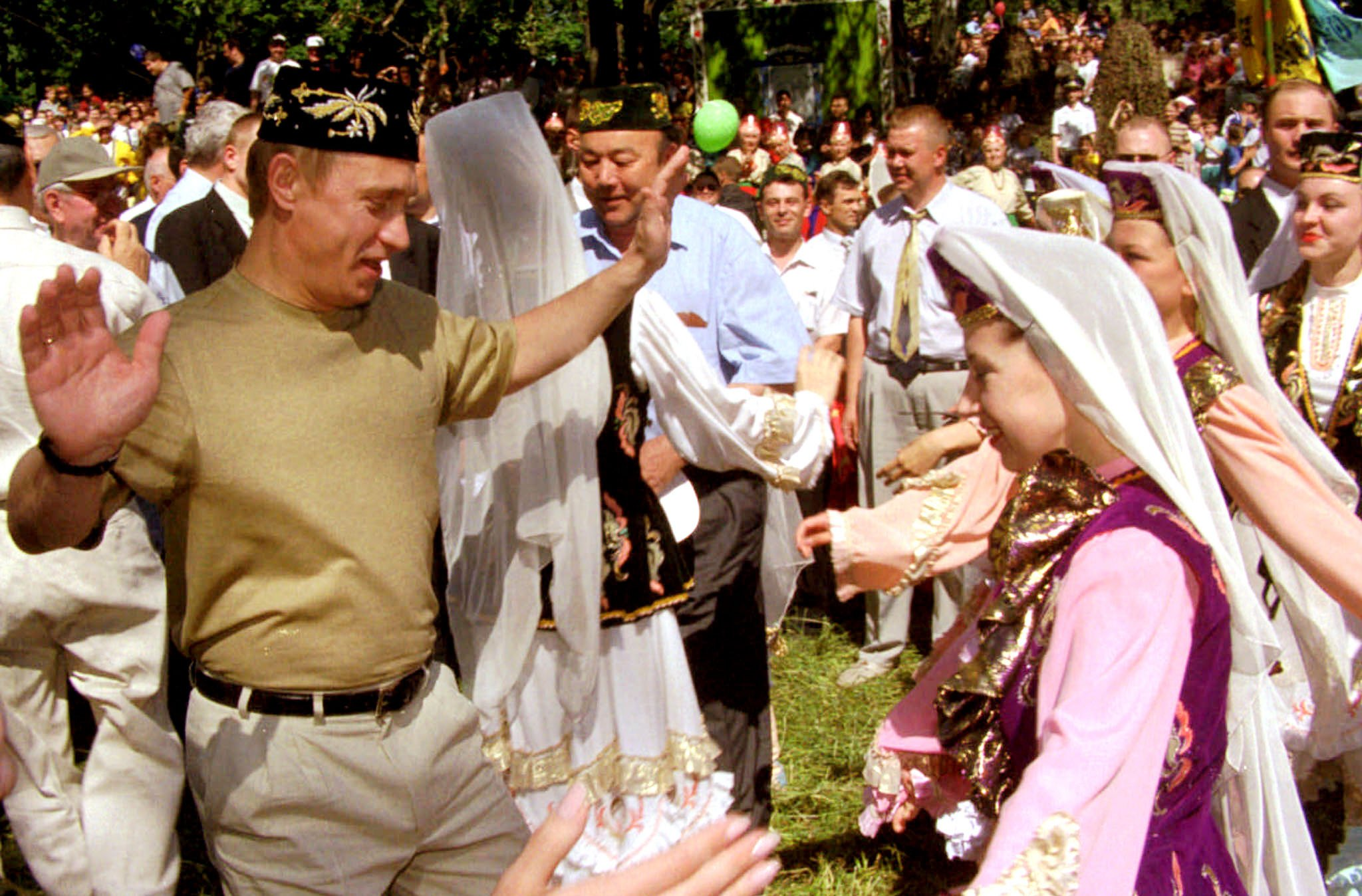
Russian President Vladimir Putin at Sabantuy, a Tatar festival

Major libraries include Kazan State University Nikolai Lobachevsky Scientific Library and the National Library of the Republic of Tatarstan. There are two museums of republican significance, as well as 90 museums of local importance. In the past several years, new museums appeared throughout the Republic.

There are twelve theatrical institutions in Tatarstan. The state orchestra is the National Tatarstan Orchestra.

In 1996, the Tatar singer, Guzel Ahmetova, cooperated with the German Eurodance group named Snap!, when she sang the lyrics of the song "Rame".

Aida Garifullina was born in 1987 to a Tatar family in Kazan. Following studies in Nuremberg, Germany and Vienna, Austria, she has achieved fame as a lyric soprano, in high demand both on the international operatic stage and concert platform. She is also a celebrated recording artist and a promoter of the Tatar culture.

== Sports ==
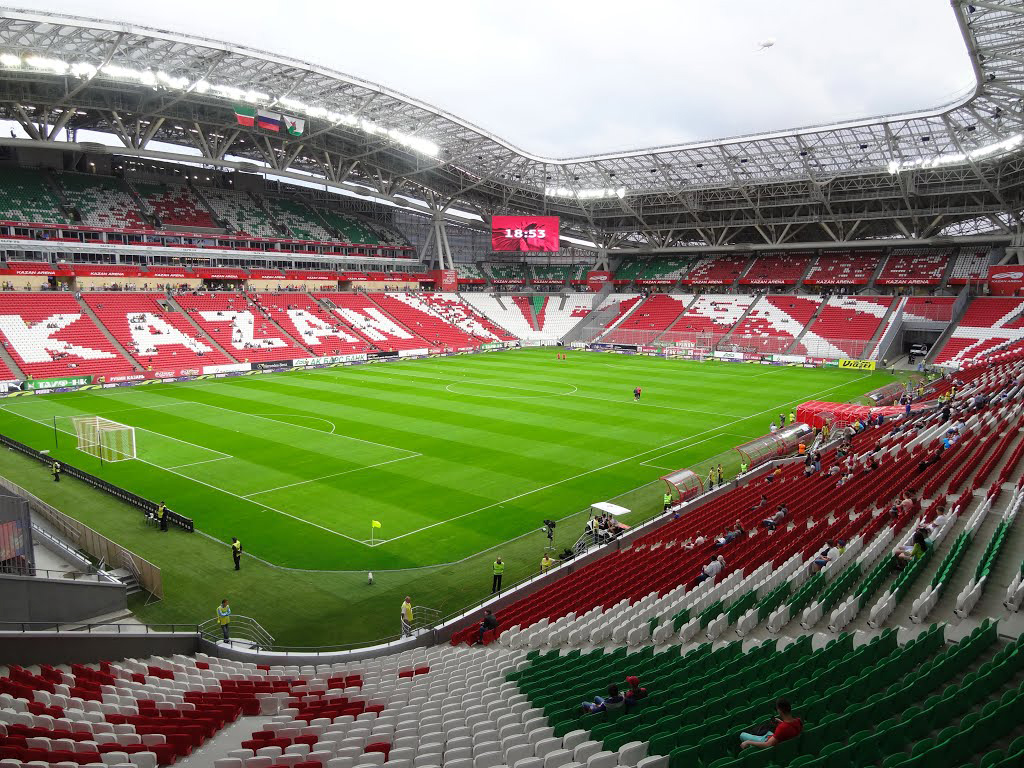
Ak Bars Arena in Kazan

With 9,175 sports venues in Tatarstan, the republic is one of the leading sports regions in Russia. Since 1973, Kazan has been making efforts to expand its sports infrastructure, with sports being a "great source of pride" for the people of Kazan.

Tatarstan has Rubin Kazan, a major European football team which has played in the UEFA Champions League and the UEFA Europa League. Twice Russian champions, Rubin Kazan play in the Russian Premier League. Also, Tatarstan has Unics Kazan which has gained a significant role in European basketball, playing in Euroleague and EuroCup for decades.

It also has two KHL teams, the successful Ak Bars Kazan, which is based in the capital city of Kazan, and the Neftekhimik Nizhnekamsk, who play in the city of Nizhnekamsk. The state also has a Russian Major League team (the second highest hockey league in Russia), Neftyanik Almetyevsk, who play in the city of Almetyevsk. There are also two Minor Hockey League teams which serve as affiliates for the two KHL teams. A team also exists in the Russian Hockey League, the HC Chelny, which is based in the city of Naberezhnye Chelny. Another team plays in the MHL-B (the second level of junior ice hockey in Russia).

Nail Yakupov is an ethnic Tatar who was drafted first overall in the 2012 NHL entry draft.

Former ATP No. 1 Marat Safin and former WTA number 1 Dinara Safina are of Tatar descent.

Victor Wild and Danil Sadreev are both Tatarstan Olympians, having won a bronze in parallel giant slalom and a silver in ski jumping, respectively.

Kazan hosted the XXVII Summer Universiade in 2013, the FINA World championship in aquatic sports in August 2015, and the World Junior Championship for swimming in 2022.

== Education ==
The most important facilities of higher education include Kazan Federal University, Kazan State Medical University, Kazan National Research Technological University, World Information Distributed University, Kazan National Research Technical University named after A.N.Tupolev and Russian Islamic University. All of these are located in the capital city, Kazan.

== Public spaces ==
Tatarstan takes a unique participatory approach to the development of public spaces that has earned it recognition. The Tatarstan Public Spaces Development Programme aims to create spaces for meeting or recreation. The programme covers a wide spectrum of projects, including streets, squares, parks, river banks, pavilions, and sports facilities.

Since 2016 (and continuing until 2022), the Architecturny Desant Architectural Bureau in Kazan has improved public spaces in each of Tatarstan's 45 municipal districts, from large cities to small villages. As of April 2019, the project had revamped 328 public spaces. By creating and rehabilitating public spaces, the programme aims to be a catalyst for positive social, economic, and environmental change.

One notable example is the "Beach" at Almetyevsk, which includes public swimming pools and a terrace. Other examples include an amphitheatre in Black Lake Park, Kazan; the Central Square in Bavly; a children's playground in Bogatye Saby village, which has a unique wooden play structure; the Cube container centre in the green beach at Gorkinsko-Ometievsky forest, Kazan; and the square on Festival Boulevard, Kazan.

The programme used an innovative participatory design approach, which later became mandatory for similar projects across Russia. This approach partners specialists with local residents at every stage of the project, from development, to implementation, to the ongoing use of the space.

The Tatarstan Public Spaces Development Programme was announced as one of the six winners of the 2019 Aga Khan Award for Architecture. The jury was impressed by the programme's systematic approach and involvement of residents to decide the future of each space.

Each public space expresses the unique identity of that particular place, tying in its history while incorporating traditional materials. Major goals of the projects include improving the quality of life for residents and improving the environment. The Arhitekturnyi Desant team aims to provide a high quality public space, no matter the size of the settlement, including quality design, infrastructure, and materials.

Spending on the public spaces projects is helping the local economy. The number of street furniture manufacturers in the area, for example, has increased from 12 to 75 since the programme started.

== See also ==
- KAZANSUMMIT
- List of Chairmen of the State Council of Tatarstan
- List of rural localities in Tatarstan
- List of Tatars
- Music of Tatarstan
