= Novokurmashevo =

Novokurmashevo Новокурмашево
- Selo
- Location within Bashkortostan Location within Russia
- Coordinates: 55°01′N 55°10′E
- Country: Russia
- Region: Bashkortostan
- District: Kushnarenkovsky District
- Time zone: UTC+5:00

Novokurmashevo (Russian: Новокурмашево; Bashkir: Яңы Ҡормаш, Yañı Qormaş) is a rural locality (a selo) in Starokurmashevsky Selsoviet, Kushnarenkovsky District, Bashkortostan, Russia. The population was 201 as of 2010. There are 4 streets.

== Geography ==
Novokurmashevo is located 17 km southwest of Kushnarenkovo (the district's administrative centre) by road. Ibragimovo is the nearest rural locality.
