= Volga Tatars =

Turkic ethnic group in the Volga-Ural region of Russia

Tatars
татарлар • tatarlar • تاتارلار
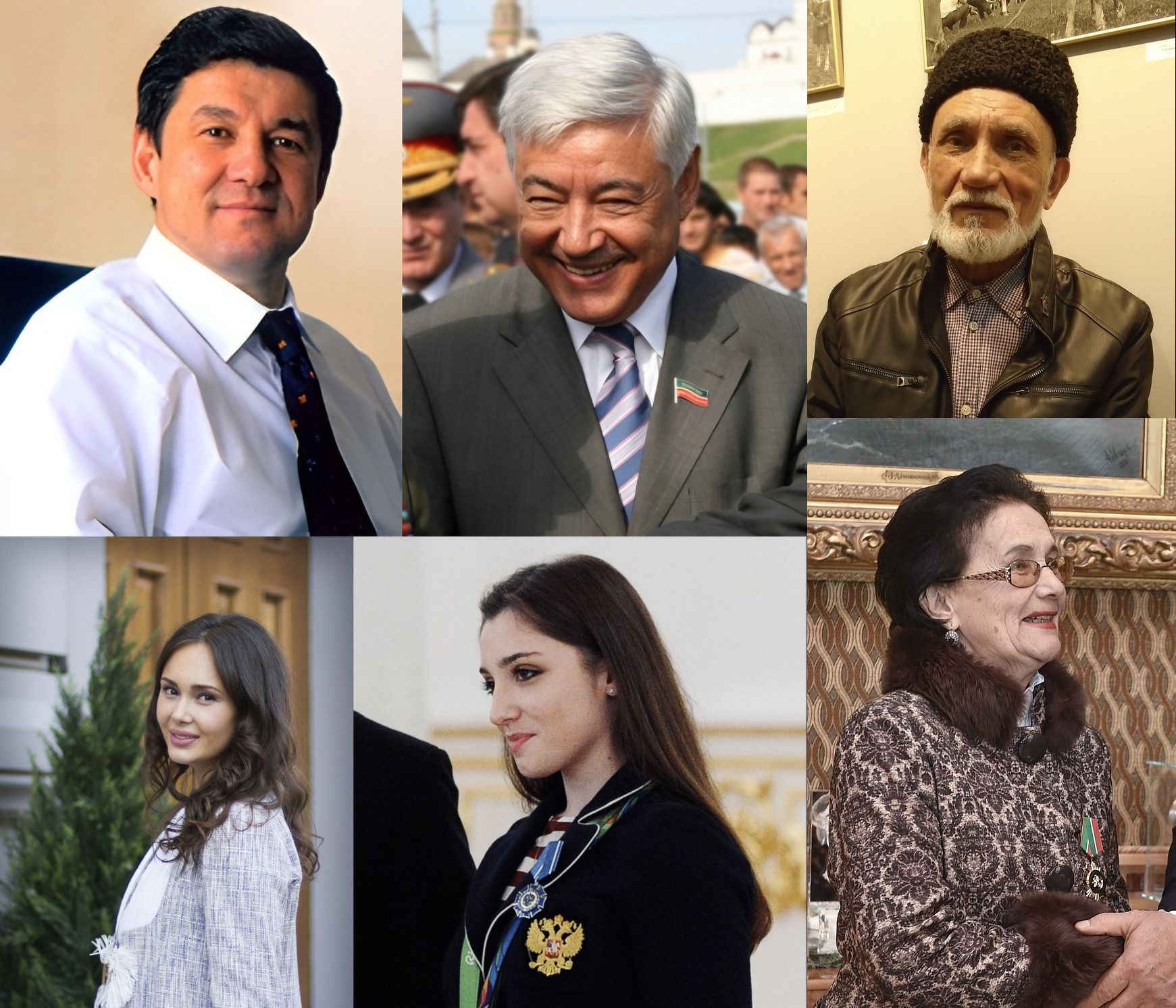
- Tatars of Idel-Ural region

Total population
- c. 6.5 million

Regions with significant populations
- Russia: Tatarstan: 2,012,571 (official); Bashkortostan: 1,009,295; Moscow: 149,043: 5,310,650
- Kazakhstan: 203,371
- Uzbekistan: 183,300 (incl. Crimean Tatars)
- Ukraine: 73,304
- Kyrgyzstan: 28,334
- Azerbaijan: 25,900
- Turkey: 25,500
- Iran: 20,000–30,000
- Turkmenistan: 8,300
- China: 5,000
- Lithuania: 4,000
- Estonia: 1,981
- Finland: 600–700
- Afghanistan: 100,000-500,000

Languages
- Tatar, Russian

Religion
- Predominantly Sunni Islam with Orthodox Christian and irreligious minority

Related ethnic groups
- Bashkirs, Chuvash, Nogais, Crimean Tatars

The Volga Tatars, also known as Volga-Ural Tatars or simply Tatars (Tatar: татарлар, romanized: tatarlar; Russian: татары, romanized: tatary) are a Turkic ethnic group native to the Volga-Ural region of western Russia, and contains multiple subgroups. Tatars are the second-largest ethnic group in Russia after ethnic Russians. They are primarily found in Tatarstan, where they make up 53.6% of the population. Their native language is Tatar, and are primarily followers of Sunni Islam.

"Tatar" as an ethnonym has a very long and complicated history, and in the past was often used as an umbrella term for different Turkic and Mongolic tribes. Nowadays it mostly refers exclusively to Volga Tatars (known simply as "Tatars"; Tatarlar), who became its "ultimate bearers" after the founding of Tatar ASSR (1920–1990; now Tatarstan). The ethnogenesis of Volga-Ural Tatars is still debated, but their history is usually connected to the Kipchak-Tatars of the Golden Horde (1242–1502), and also to its predecessor, Volga Bulgaria (900s–1200s), whose adoption of Islam is celebrated yearly in Tatarstan. After the collapse of the Golden Horde, ancestors of modern Tatars formed the Khanate of Kazan (1438–1552), which lost its independence to Russia after the Siege of Kazan in 1552.

After hundreds of years under Russian rule, the Tatars are now well integrated into Russian society. However, they continue to maintain a distinct culture, characterized by their Islamic faith and native Turkic language. Since the industrialization of the Soviet Union, the Tatar language has been increasingly replaced by Russian in daily life, and separatist sentiments occasionally emerge. Islam has regained a stronger presence among the Tatars following the anti-religious policies of the Soviet era. The muftiate of Tatarstan is the Spiritual Administration of Muslims of the Republic of Tatarstan, currently led by Kamil Samigullin.

Some notable Tatars include Gabdulla Tukay, Ayaz Ishaki, Shihabetdin Mardzhani, Galimdzhan Ibragimov, Rustam Minnikhanov, Rashid Nezhmetdinov, Rudolf Nureyev, Rinat Fakhretdinov, Aida Garifullina, and Marat Safin.

== History ==
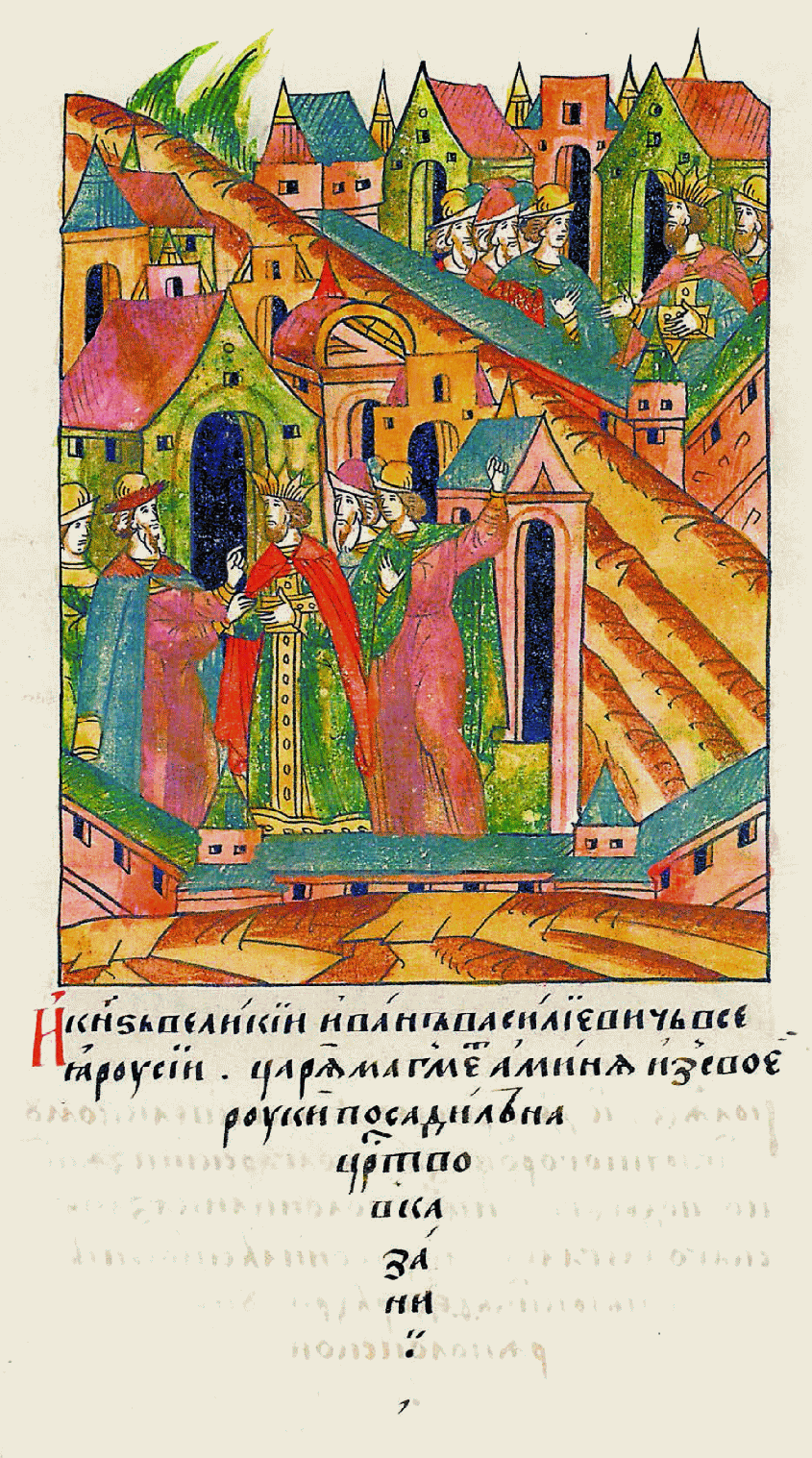
Muhammed Amin, the three-time khan of Kazan Khanate in the Tsar Book (16th century).

The cultural center for Idel-Ural Tatars is the Republic of Tatarstan (Russian Federation). Its predecessor was the Tatar Autonomous Soviet Socialist Republic, established in 1920. It was the first successful Tatar formation since the Kazan Khanate. Tatars have been the subjects of Russia since after the Siege of Kazan in 1552. Many Tatars live in different regions of Russia, outside of Tatarstan as well. They have diasporas across the globe also, such as the Finnish Tatars.

During the period of the Russian Empire, the Turkic Muslim population of Idel-Ural region were generally called Tatars, and eventually, the name was extended to most of the other Turkic peoples of Russia as well (Azerbaijanis – Transcaucasian Tatars). The history of the ethnonym traces back to the times of the Golden Horde, when its feudal nobility used it to denote its citizens. Russian feudals and the Tsar government started using it also. These different tribes usually identified themselves by their geographical group name, or, generally as Muslims (Qazanlı, Möselman, etc.). The name Bolgar was also referenced. They avoided using the term Tatar due to the negative connotation of the Mongol-Tatars of the past.

Nowadays, many of the ethnic differences between Volga Tatar groups of Volga-Ural have disappeared. Some, especially unique dialectical features remain. The majority of Volga-Ural Tatars (Kazan Tatars and Mishars) are usually thought to be descendants of the Kipchaks of Golden Horde. Others emphasize the role of its predecessor, Volga Bulgaria, but many also think these both played a part. Tatar historian G. R. Yenikeev criticizes the phenomenon of identifying with Bulgars and thinks, that this happened due to the "pro-western rulers of the Romanov government", with the help of Bulgarist-mullahs and European historians, that created a negative and distorted image of the ancient Tatars, which ended up causing them to reject the term and lose national consciousness. Finnish historian Antero Leitzinger: "They [Bulgarists] emphasize the contribution of the Bulgars mainly due to the feeling of inferiority created by the Russians, which is often attached to the Orda (organization) population".

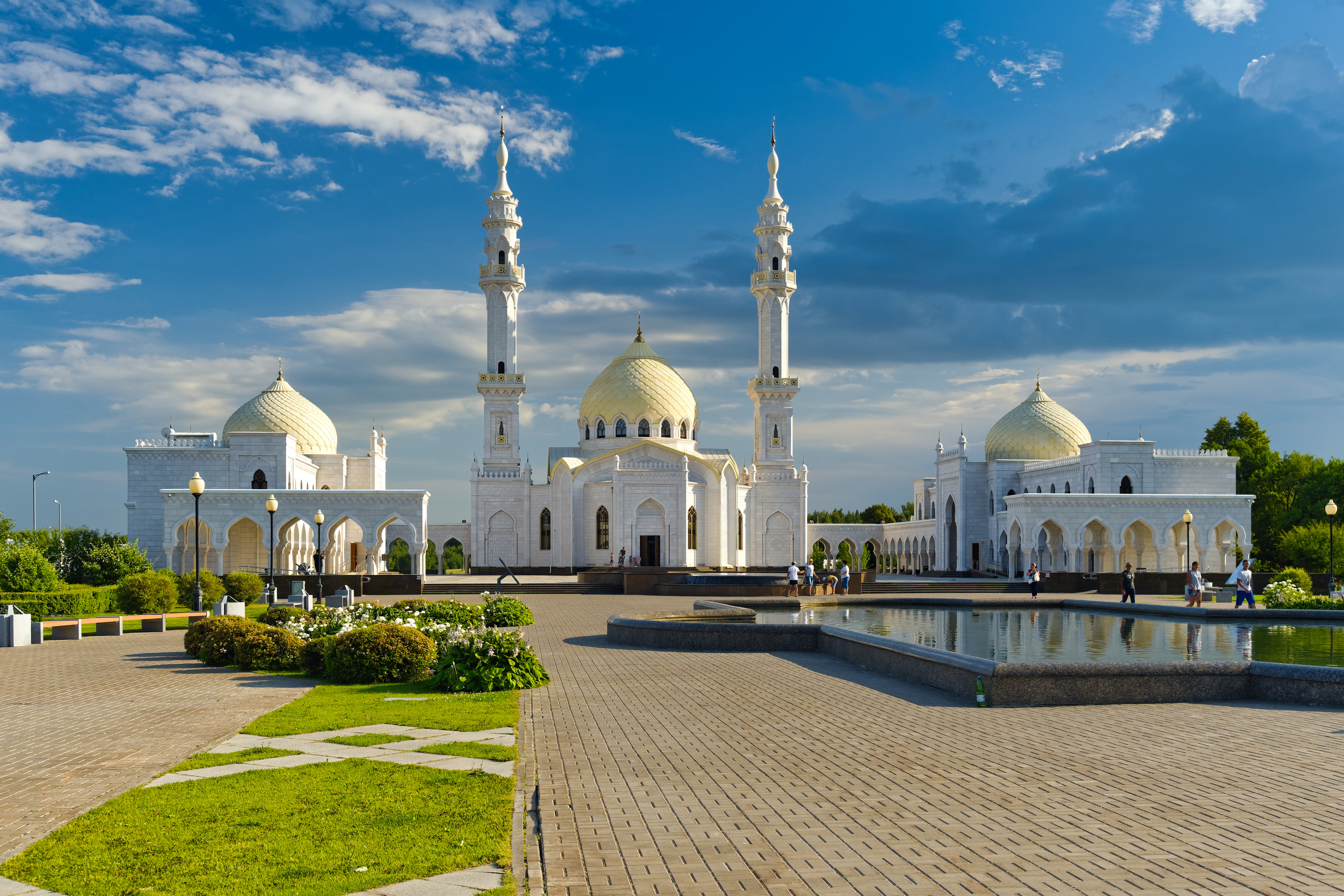
The White Mosque complex, located in the city of Bolgar, Tatarstan.

Today, while the legacy of the Golden Horde is largely embraced, Volga Bulgaria is also seen as an integral part of the Tatar history, one way or another. The Bulgar conversion to Islam in 922 is celebrated yearly in Tatarstan. Tatar encyclopedia Tatarica: "The people of the Volga Bulgarian state formed the basis of the Tatar ethnos. The culture of the Volga Bulgarian state is one of the most important components of the historical and cultural heritage of the Tatar people".

The 1921–1922 famine in Tatarstan was a period of mass starvation and drought that took place in the Tatar ASSR as a result of war communism policy, in which 500 thousand to 2 million peasants died. The event was part of the greater Russian famine of 1921–22 that affected other parts of the USSR, in which up 5 million people died in total. Tatar authorities have attempted since the 1990s, after the dissolution of the Soviet Union, to reverse the Russification of Tatarstan that took place during the Soviet period.

== Culture ==
=== Language ===
Tatar is a Turkic language which belongs to the sub-branch of Kipchak languages called Kipchak–Bulgar. According to 2002 census, there were 5,3 million Tatar speakers in Russia, and in 2010, 4,3 million.

Tatar can be divided into two main dialects:

- Central (Urta / Kazan – most common and also the literary language)
- Western (Könbatış / Mishar)

Some linguists think that Siberian Tatar is a third dialect of Tatar. Crimean Tatar is a different language, although also part of the Kipchak group.

Most of the Uralic languages in the Volga River area have strongly influenced the Tatar language, as have the Arabic, Persian and Russian languages. One characteristic feature of Tatar is its use of the Arabic ğayn; whereas other Turkic languages generally disregard the Arabic ayin sound, Tatar always replaces it with ğayn (Turkish sanat [art], Tatar sənğət / сәнгать; from Arabic صنعة, ṣanʕa).

What most noticeably separates the Mishar dialect from Standard Tatar is that it doesn't pronounce the uvular ğayn or qâf, and both c and ç are affricates (instead of [ʑ] and [ɕ]).

Example sentence of Tatar language in the Latin script: Əlifba reformalarına qadər törki xalıqlar ğərəp imləsındağı əsərlərne uqıp, ber ük ədəbi teldə aralaşa torğan bulğan. Ğərəp-farsı lisannarı belən tanış bulu böten möselman ömməteneñ əsərlərenə ireşüne ciñeləytkən. ("Before the alphabet reforms, Turkic peoples read works written in Arabic script and communicated in a shared literary language. Familiarity with the Arabic and Persian languages made it easier to access the works of the entire Muslim ummah").

==== Names ====
Ever since the Arabic influence spread among Tatars due to adoption of Islam, Tatar names have been mostly rooted in Arabic, though some Turkic-Persian names are still in use, such as Bulat and Aygöl. Compound Arabic-Turkic-Persian names used to be very common for Tatars (Möxəmmətzakir, Əxmətcan, Xodaybirde; Bibifatıyma, Ğaliyəbanu, Şəmsebənat). Many of these compound names were shortened later (Şəymöxəmmət, Şəymi).

A Tatar surname is the personal name of one's male ancestor from the times of the surname law (early 1900s), accompanied by a Russian suffix, like Nizametdin –> Nizametdinov / Nizametdinova, Musa –> Musin / Musina.

=== Religion ===
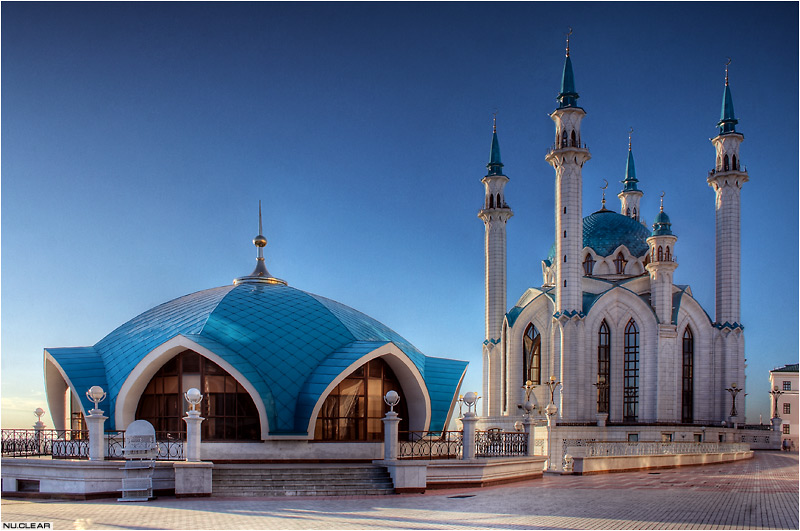
The Kul Sharif Mosque in Kazan.

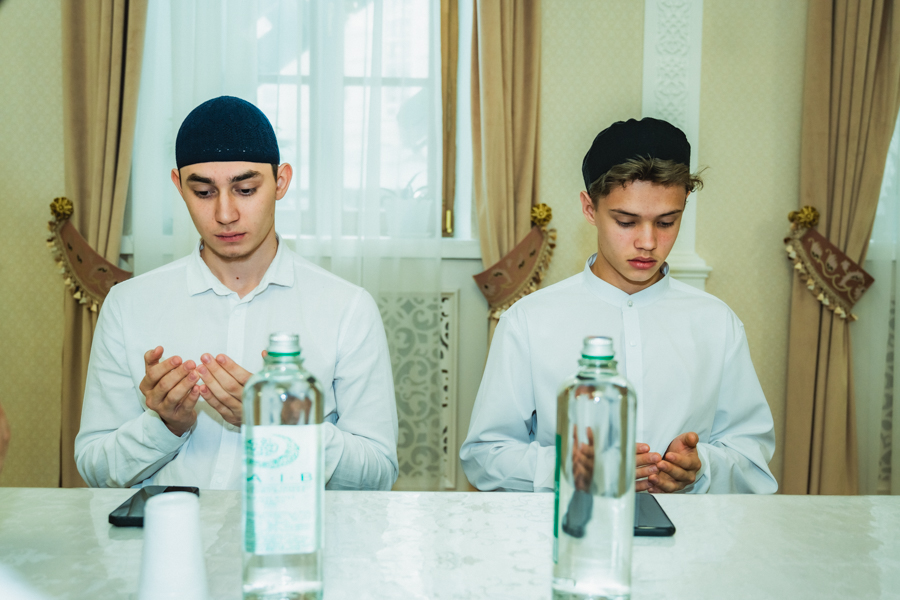
Prayer at the Marjani mosque in Kazan (2024).

The Islamic roots of the Volga region trace back to Volga Bulgaria (922). Since then, Islam also has a centuries old history in Russia. Volga Tatars played a significant role in the national and cultural movements of Muslims during Russian Empire and also in Soviet Union. Islam is currently the majority religion in Tatarstan.

In September 2010, Eid al-Fitr and 21 May, the day the Volga Bulgars embraced Islam, were made public holidays. During that time the head of Tatarstan, Rustam Minnikhanov negotiated for use of Islamic banking and the first halal food production facility opened with foreign companies expressing their interest to expand the project in Tatarstan.

The muftiate of Tatarstan is the Spiritual Administration of Muslims of the Republic of Tatarstan.

==== Radicalism ====
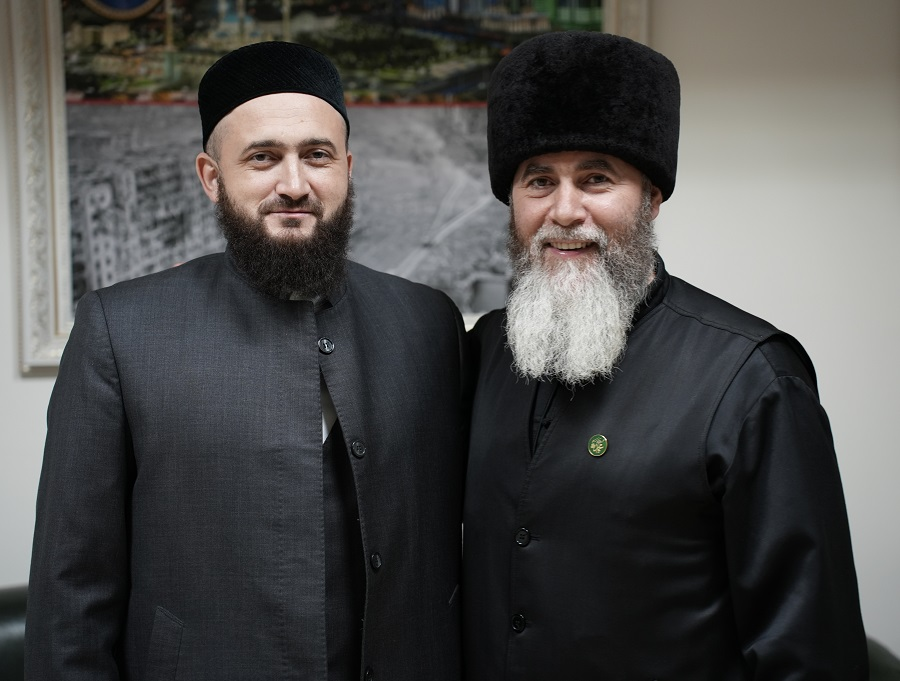
Kamil Samigullin, the mufti of Tatarstan with the mufti of the Chechen Republic Salah Mezhiev during a meeting at the Muftiate of the Chechen Republic (2023). Both mufti's have spoken against Wahhabism, which they think should be banned at a government level.

The religious situation of the Tatars began to change significantly in the 2010s. The new generation was dissatisfied with their spiritual life and experienced a stronger sense of religious identity. During the Soviet era, this had been weakened by the anti-religious policies of the time, which had led to the break with their largely Sufi-influenced tradition. The Tatars had also played a significant role as representatives of the reform movement Jadidism.

New attitudes were already noticeable in the 1990s. Tatar imams used to be trained in Bukhara or Tashkent, but after the collapse of the Soviet Union these connections were severed. As a result, they increasingly began to receive their training abroad, especially in Saudi Arabia, Egypt, Tunisia, Jordan and Turkey. "In these countries they see a great contrast between local traditions and the fading traditions familiar from Tatarstan, leading to their radicalization."

The term "Caucasization of Tatarstan" or Volga-Urals has been coined to describe some of the radical Islamic elements found in the region, that mainly come from the Caucasus. Muslim migration from Central-Asia has also played a part. In 2006, Dokka Umarov stated: "We will never separate the lands of the Caucasus from the Volga region. . . . We will also liberate other lands occupied by Rusnya [a derogatory Chechen term for Russia]. These include Astrakhan and the lands along the Volga that are under the hoof of the Russian kafirs."

More radical versions of Islam were previously very rare and sporadic in Tatarstan. The most famous examples were the Ittifaq Party, whose leader Fauziya Bairamova was pro-Salafist in the 2000s. Imam Rustem Safin in Kazan was suspended for two years for his association with the pan-Islamic Hizb al-Tahrir party. A few dozen Tatars participated in the Chechen separatist wars, and in 2010 the Tatarstan Interior Ministry disbanded a short-lived formation in Nurlat district that had tried to imitate the Dagestan extremist movement of the 1990s.

Then, in 2012, the Tatar mufti Valiulla Yakupov, who opposed extremism, was shot dead in Kazan. On the same day, mufti Ildus Fayzov was injured when his car was blown up. A month later, another car exploded; this time, a bomb was supposedly detonated accidentally. Inside the car, three bodies were found, along with weapons and radical Islamic literature. They were suspected of planning an attack on president Vladimir Putin, who was visiting Tatarstan. Around the same time, a demonstration by supporters of Sharia law was seen, which was "very unusual for Tatarstan".

A 2021 George Washington University study of Islam in Russia states: "The majority of Russian Muslims feel well integrated into Russia and show similar patriotism to Orthodox citizens. They favor either traditional Sufi-influenced Islam or a more politically engaged Islam that supports Putin. In addition, there is a small but increasingly influential minority of more radical anti-Russian Salafists.".

Disagreement about what is "traditional Tatar Islam" exists also outside of the Salafi-Wahhabi conflict. Mufti of Tatarstan, Kamil Samigullin belongs to the Turkish Sufi Naqshbandi order, which some, like the mufti of Moscow Ravil Gainutdin, think is not compatible with "Tatar spirit of Islam". Samigullin is not the first Tatar Naqshbandi member however; notable Tatar religious figures of the past, such as Zaynulla Rasulev, Utyz-Imani, Shihabetdin Marjani and Gabdennasyr Kursawi all belonged to Naqshbandi.

=== Literature ===
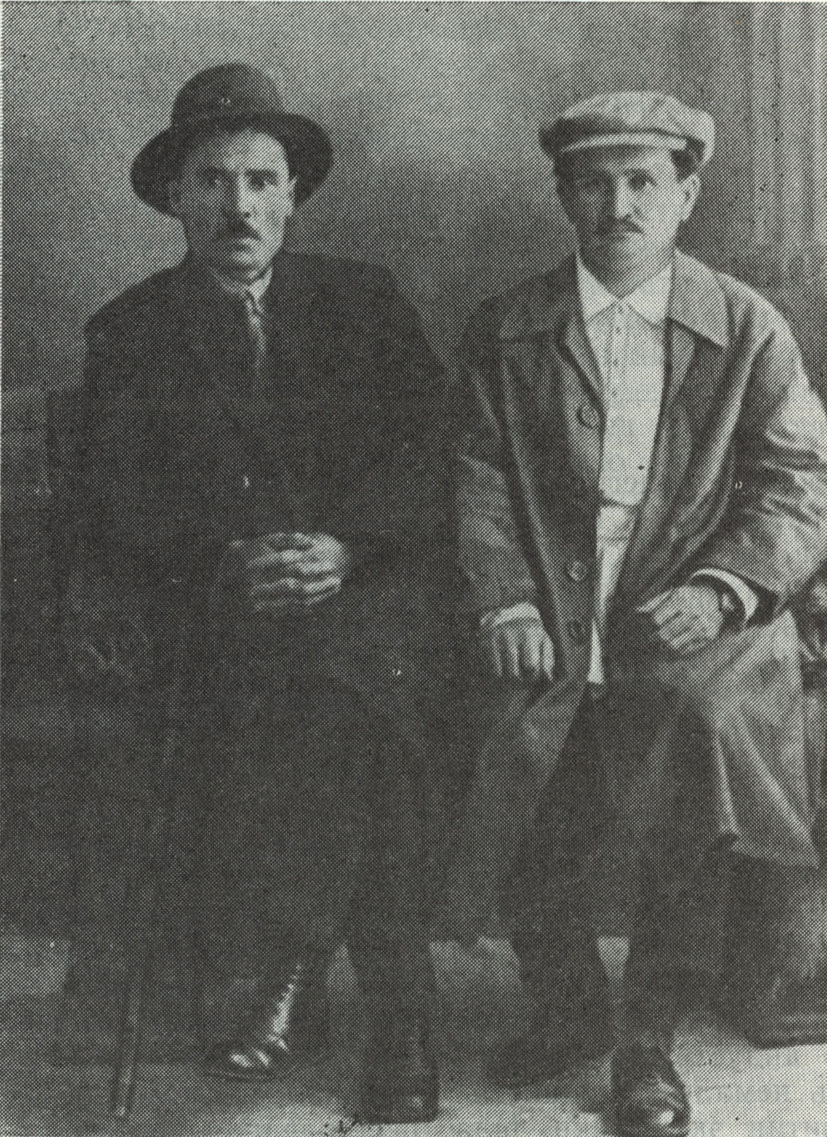
Tatar writers Ğəlimcan İbrahimov and Şəhit Əxmədiyev (1928).

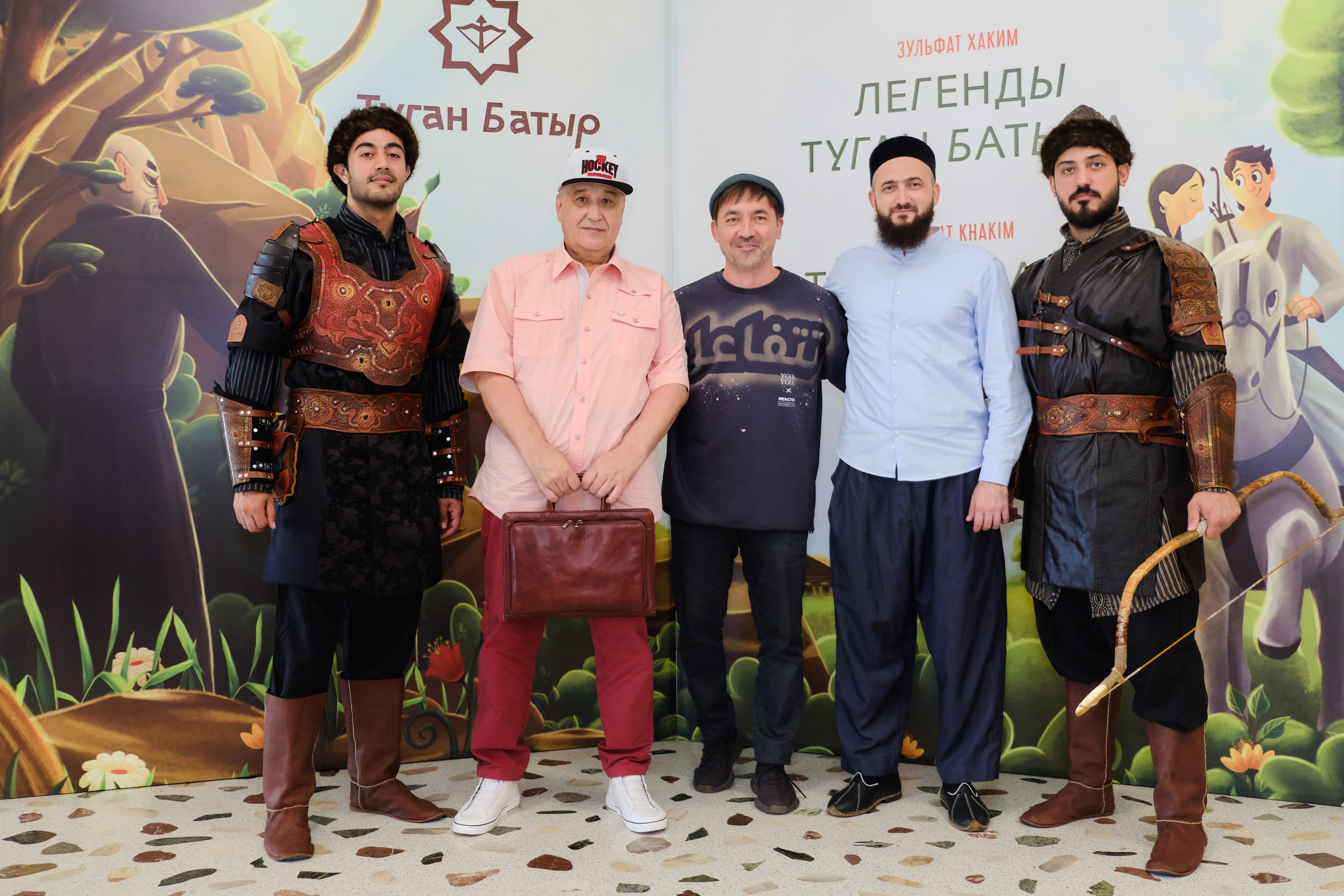
Publication of Tatar book Tuğan Batır (Туган Батыр), by author Zölfət Xəkim, who is in the picture second from left (2022).

As their literary language, Tatars used local variant of Türki until the early 1900s. Its norms began to move towards the spoken vernacular from the mid 1800s. The basis for a new literary language was created by migration and urbanization. The vocabulary and phonetics of it is based mostly on the Kazan Dialect and the morphology on Mishar Dialect. Ğabdulla Tuqay (1886–1913) is often considered the founder of modern Tatar literary language.

Tatar literature has an ancient history. Before the introduction of printing, ancient Tatar books written in Arabic script were copied by hand. Manuscripts of the Koran, other spiritual literature, educational books were widely distributed. One of the earliest works of national Tatar literature known is considered to be written at the beginning of the 13th century by the famous Volga Bulgar poet Qol Ğəli, the poetic work Qissa-i Yosıf (قصه یوسف, Tale of Yusuf). The first printed edition in the Tatar language was the Manifesto of Peter I on the occasion of the Persian campaign, published in 1722.

The Golden Horde and the subsequent Khanate of Kazan (1438–1552) were a period of great flowering for Turkic-Tatar literature. Many different literary genres developed significantly during this period. Among the most famous writers of the Golden Horde was Nasreddin bine Borhaneddin Rabğuzi, whose works are considered part of their literary heritage by modern Tatars and Uzbeks. Notable poet of Kazan Khanate was Möxəmməd Yar. Tatar literature was negatively affected by the loss of independence to Russia in the mid-16th century, and many works were destroyed. During the Russian Empire, new works were created, although fewer. Examples of these include the 18th–century poets Ğəbdessəlam bine Uray and Ğəbderrəxim Utız İməni. Others also used Tatar; for example, the well-known Kazakh poet Abay Qunanbayulı in many of his poems in the 18th century.

The Tatar cultural reneissance of the 20th century was showcased in literature as well. Many notable works were created by, among others, Ğabdulla Tuqay, Fatix Əmirxan, Dərdemənd and Ğəliəsğar Kamal. During the Soviet era, there was a conflict among Tatar writers; some collaborated with the government and even wrote on revolutionary topics, while others were against this and distanced themselves from the new Tatar society. Writers who were in one way or another pro-communist included Hadi Taqtaş, who has been described as the "Mayakovsky of the Tatars". Ğəlimcan İbrahimov's novel Tirən tamırlar (Deep Roots, 1928) is about class struggle, and Qawi Nəcmi received the Stalin Prize in 1951 for his work Yazğı cillər ("Spring Winds"), which was translated into 26 Soviet languages. World War II also appeared as a theme in Tatar literature, such as in the collection of poems Moabit dəftəre by the Hero of the Soviet Union Musa Cəlil. In the 1980s and 1990s, themes of the independence of the Tatar people became popular; for example, in the works of Rəşit Əxmətcanov and Zölfət Xəkim.

=== Theater ===
The first published Tatar play was by Ğabdraxman İlyas in 1887, called "Biçara qız" (Бичара кыз, "The Unhappy Girl"). It was partially met with negative reception by the conservative Tatar audiences of the time due to including "advanced ideas based on social equality". A professional Tatar theater group Səyər (Сәйяр) emerged in early 1907 in Uralsk. This group is thought of being the basis for the Galiaskar Kamal Tatar Academic theatre, located in Kazan, Tatarstan. Today, the theater's repertoire mainly includes plays in the Tatar language, but also some plays written by Russians and others. For people who do not speak the language, an opportunity has been arranged to watch Tatar plays with translation. Among notable Tatar playwrights are Mirxəydər Fəyzi, Kərim Tinçurin, Ğəliəsğar Kamal, Ğayaz İsxaqi, and more recently, Zölfət Xəkim.

=== Music ===
Professional Tatar music culture took shape during the Soviet era. In the mid-20th century, many Tatar composers became famous, including Cəwdət Fəyzi, Salix Səydəşev, Mansur Mozaffarov, Nəcip Cihanov. The largest center of Tatar folk music is the Musa Dzhalil Opera and Ballet Theater. The first Tatar opera, Saniyə, was performed in 1925. It was composed by Soltan Ğəbəşi, in collaboration with Vasily Vinogradov. Fərit Yarullin composed the first Tatar ballet, Şürəle. Sofia Gubaidulina has been called one of the "most significant Russian composers of the late 20th century". Compositor Rashid Kalimullin's works have been performed worldwide and Aida Garifullina performed together with Robbie Williams in the 2018 FIFA World Cup.

Notable Tatar folk singers include Rəşit Wahapov, Xəydər Bigiçev, Rafail İlyasov. Modern Tatar musicians include İttifaQ, Usal (Усал), Tatarka, K-Ru, Taraf, Saida Mukhametzyanova (Сайда Мухаметзянова), Malsi Music, Dyshat (Дышать). A "legendary Tatar folk-rock group" Başkarma is from Finland.

=== Celebrations ===
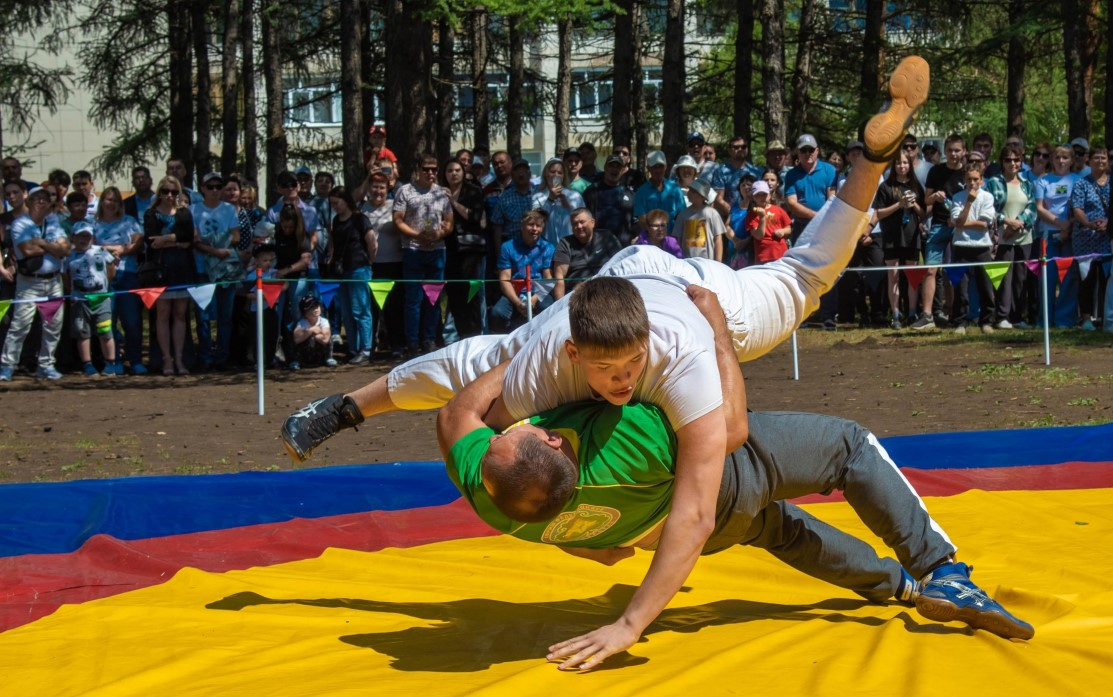
Sabantuy wrestling (körəş, 2023).

The traditional celebrations of the Tatar people include both, ancient Turkic and common Islamic celebrations. The Persian New Year Nowruz (Нәүруз, Nəwrüz) is also celebrated among the Tatars.

The most famous Tatar cultural holiday is Sabantuy (Сабантуй; also Saban tuyı, Сабан туе). It dates back to pre-Islamic times as a harvest festival for farmers. Today, Sabantuy is a national holiday in Tatarstan. It includes competitive sports, such as wrestling and horseback riding. Sabantuy is celebrated not only by neighboring nations, but also for example in Kazakhstan (Sabantoy, Сабантой). The wrestling genre that belongs to it, körəş (көрөш), is also widely known among Turkic peoples (in Turkish güreş, in Uzbek kurash, etc.).

== Status in Russia ==
=== Language reform ===
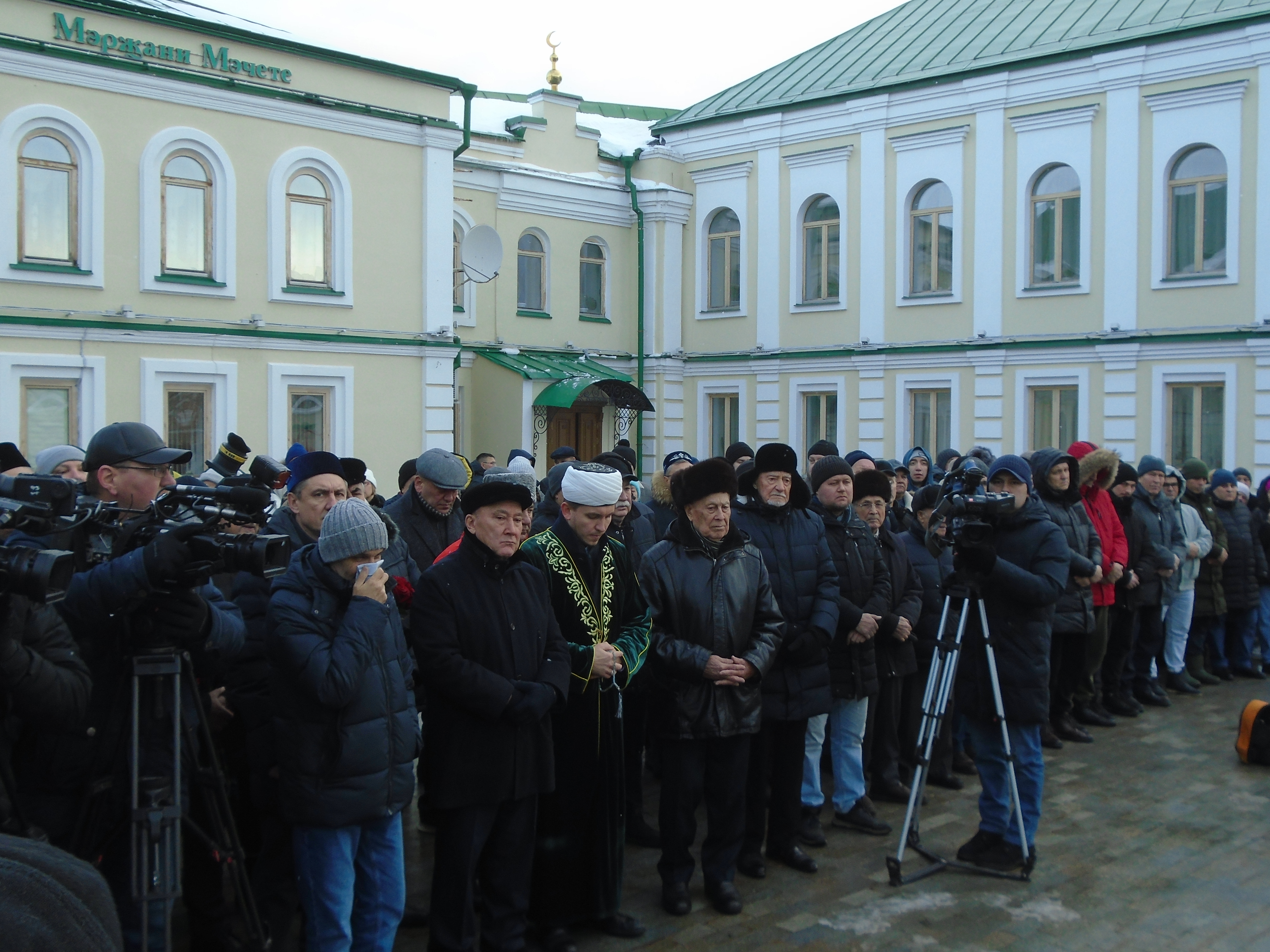
Tatars in Kazan (2023).

In 2017, the amount of hours Tatar language taught in Tatarstan schools was reduced to two hours per week and it can only happen with a written approval from the pupil's parent. President Vladimir Putin reasoned that a person should not be forced "to learn a language, that is not his mother language", which refers to complaints made by parents of Russian students who were dissatisfied that their children had to learn Tatar that in return took time away from studying Russian. Before this, for 25 years, everyone in Tatarstan (including Russians) had to learn Tatar from kindergarten to secondary school. In 2021 there were approximately 53% Tatars in Tatarstan and 40% Russians. In 2015 enquiry, most young people in the state preferred to learn Russian or English and thought that Tatar was not useful in work life.

=== Tatars and Russians ===
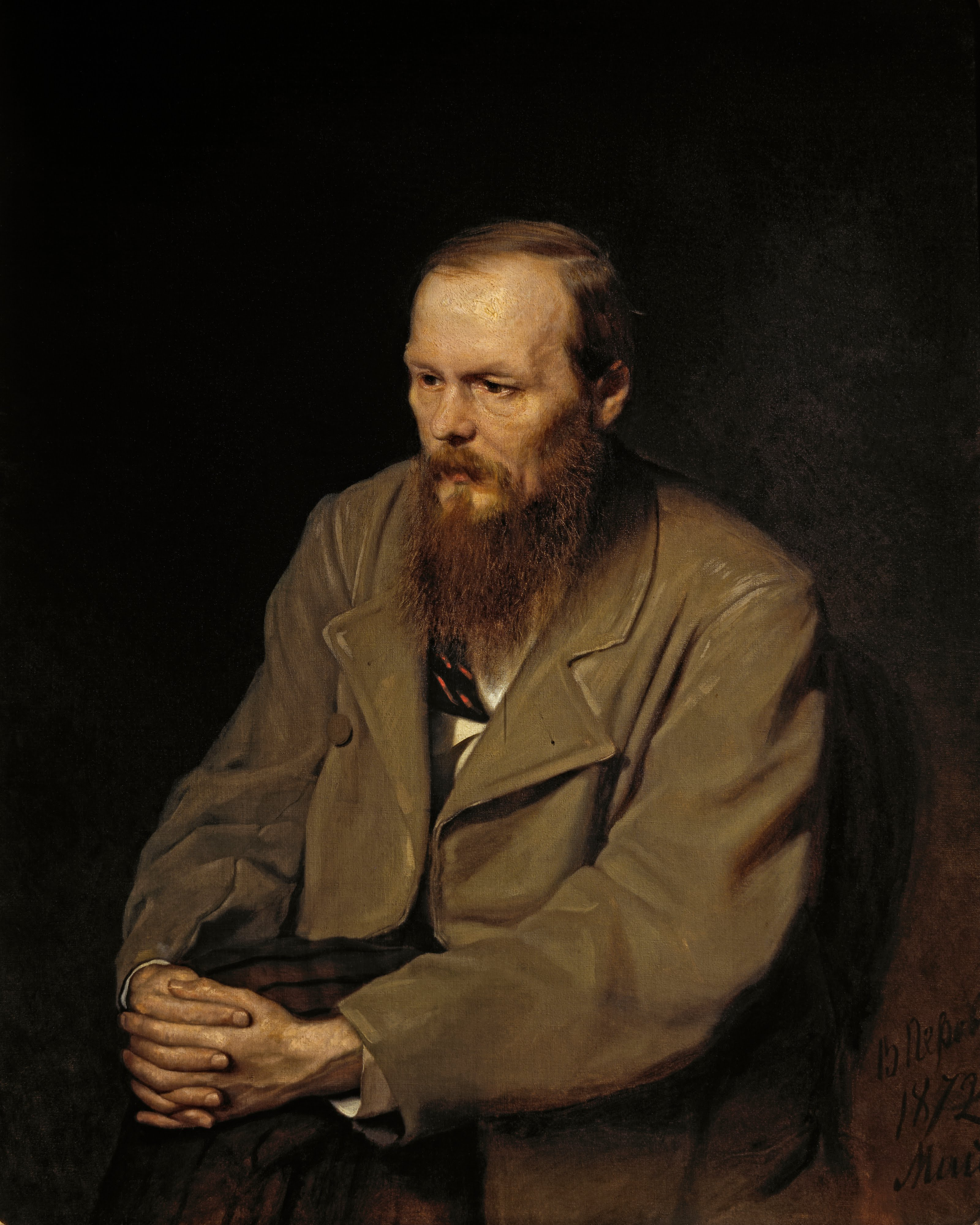
Fyodor Dostoevsky, Russian novelist, short story writer, essayist and journalist. Tatar writers like Ayaz Ishaki were heavily influenced by Russian authors.

A version of the Tatarstan flag sometimes used by Tatar separatists.

Unity Day 2015. President Vladimir Putin and different religious figures. Among them, Tatars Talgat Tadzhuddin (third from left), and Ravil Gainutdin (on the right).

Volga Tatars are the second biggest ethnic group in Russia.

The long and multifaceted history between these two ethnic groups can be traced back to the times of Volga Bulgaria and the Golden Horde. Tatars have been a part of Russia since the 1500s. Later, among Tatars, there is both people, who are against Russia, and those that believe they are an integral part of it. Among Tatar separatists is the ethnic nationalist, founder of independence party İttifaq, Fauziya Bayramova. In 2018 Rafis Kashapov, a Tatar activist founded in Kyiv a separatist movement called "Free Idel-Ural". Famous pro-Russian examples include the Grand Mufti of Russia, supporter of Eurasianism, Talgat Tadzhuddin. He and another Tatar Mufti Kamil Samigullin have supported the Russian invasion of Ukraine. Head of Tatarstan, Rustam Minnikhanov stated in June 2023 that "Tatarstan fully supports the Supreme Commander-in-Chief, President of the country Vladimir Vladimirovich Putin; the most correct thing now is to stand together against those who pose a threat to Russia and its multinational people".

Importance of the independence for Tatarstan comes up usually when discussing the Russification of Tatars, but it has also been noted, that it wouldn't necessarily solve the problem at least entirely. "Increasingly, minority peoples themselves decide to teach their children Russian to ensure economic integration". (K. Zubacheva, 2019). Researcher in Bremen University, Daria Dergacheva thinks independence could happen in time, but also, that it would be very difficult and might not achieve the decolonization desired. She also states, that the ethnic nationalism required for it could fuel inter-ethnic conflicts, since Tatars are only 53% of the population in Tatarstan. Challenges include also the fact that Tatarstan is deeply embedded in Russia's economy, trade, and infrastructure.

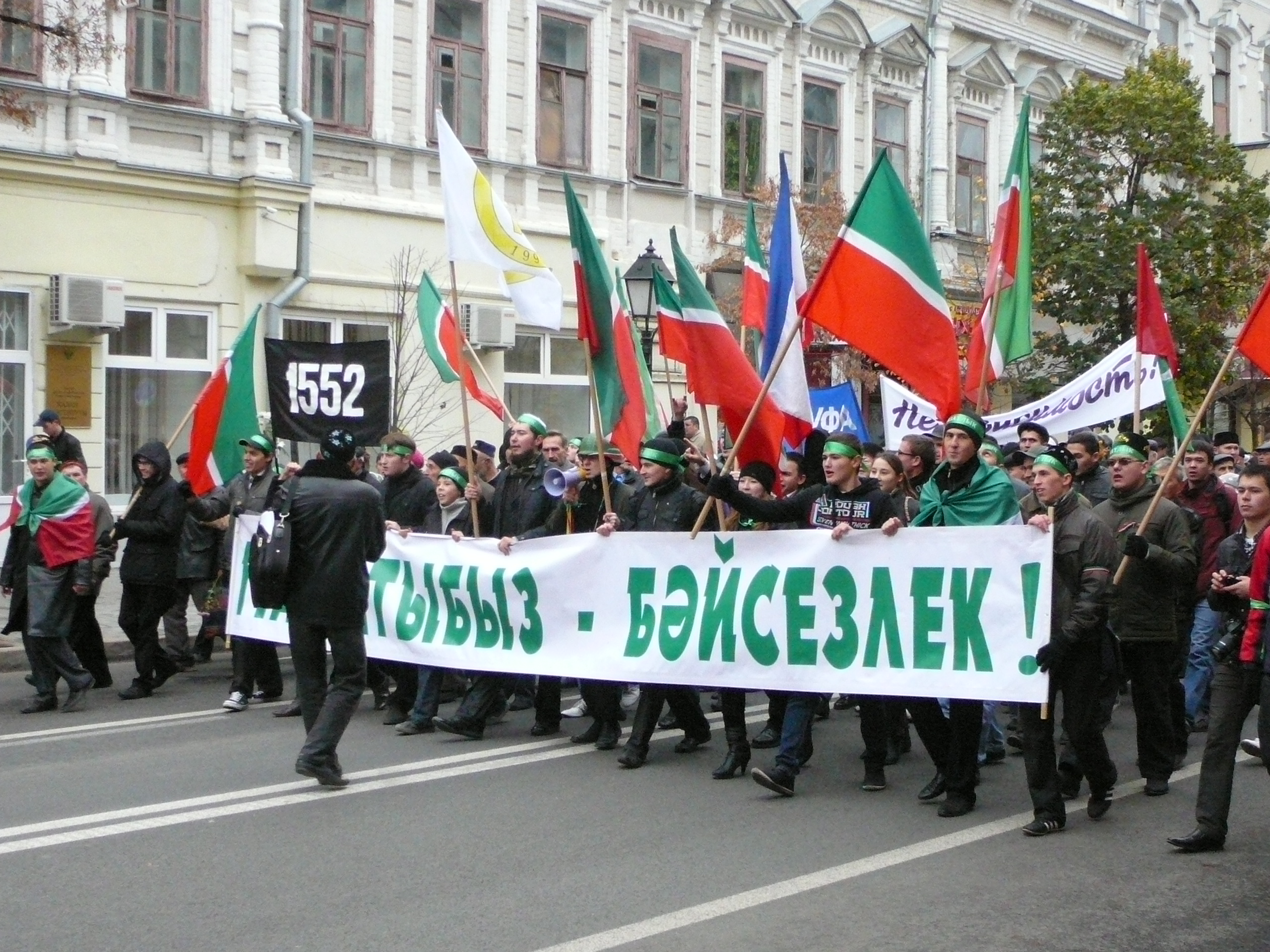
Annual day of remembrance for the victims of the Siege of Kazan (Xəter köne, Tatarstan 2011).

The national poet Ğabdulla Tuqay wrote in response to the Tatar emigration to Turkey that was happening in the late 1800s and early 1900s: "Here we were born, here we grew up, and here the moment of our death will come. Fate itself has bound us to this Russian land". Tuqay called Russians their "brother people".

G. R. Yenikeev states, that "Medieval Tatars played a significant role also in the formation of Russians". He cites the Eurasianist historian Lev Gumilev: "Tatars are in our blood, our history, our language, our worldview. Whatever the real differences with the Russians, the Tatars are not a people outside us, but within us". In Kazan (Tatarstan) there is a statue of Gumilev. Tatar author Galimdzhan Ibragimov: "We Tatars are a nation that joined Russia before others. Despite the dark politics of the autocracy and the differences between the two communities, this created many common features of life among them".

Tatar mufti Ravil Gainutdin has stated, that in his opinion "Russia was created by Turks as much as it was by Slavs". The foundation for such ideas were laid out by Crimean Tatar Jadidist thinker Ismail Gasprinsky, who believed in unity of the two peoples and thought Russia was "a continuation of the Golden Horde".

In his 2016 book, "Moscow and the Tatar World" (Москва и татарский мир), the Tatar historian from Kazan, Bulat Rakhimzyanov makes a claim that "there was no large-scale confrontation between Moscow and the Tatars in the Middle Ages".

Tatar and Russian peasants joined their forces multiple times in the past. For example, the 1606–1609 "mountaineer rebellion", in which the Chuvash and Mordvins also took part. The most famous of these, however, is the Pugachev rebellion, in which a large number of Tatars participated. According to Alfred Khalikov, "the tsarist government and both the Russian and Tatar feudal lords were afraid of friendship between peoples and constantly incited chauvinistic and nationalist fervor".

The first mufti of Russia, Tatar-born Mukhamedzhan Khusainov (1756–1824) had a big impact on bringing Russian rule to the Kazakh steppes and also to Caucasus, especially among Kabardians.

Philologist-journalist Azat Akhunov: "Despite conflicts and national differences, Tatars are very close to Russians in mentality, even more so than Ukrainians and Belarusians. We have a common historical experience that cannot be denied. As long as our culture is respected and not disturbed, we are the best neighbors, friends and colleagues of the Russian people.

== Subgroups ==
=== Kazan / Mishar ===
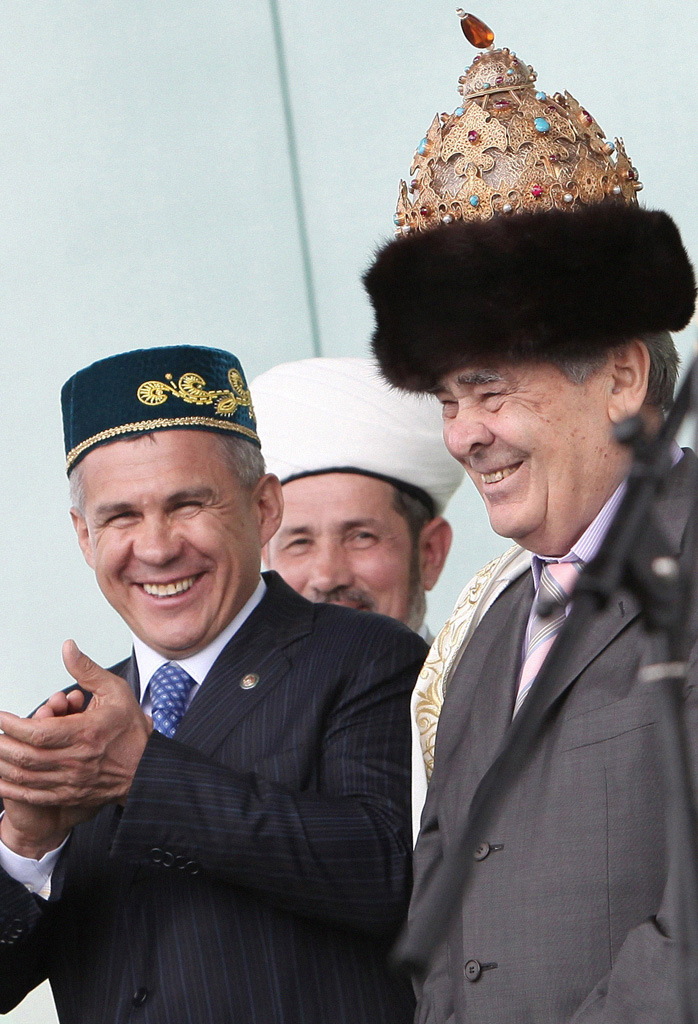
Head of Tatarstan Rustam Minnikhanov (left) and former head Mintimer Shaimiev during the "İzge Bolğar cıyını" festivities in Kazan, the annual anniversary of the adoption of Islam by Volga Bulgaria.

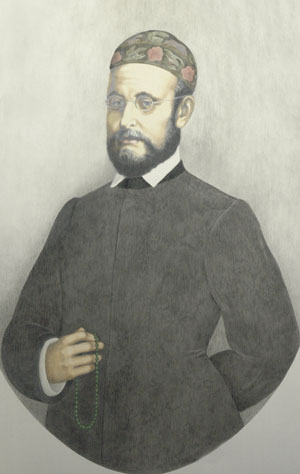
Mishar Tatar historian and philologist, Husain Faizkhanov (1823–1866).

The biggest group of Volga-Ural Tatars are the Kazan Tatars (Qazan tatarları / qazanlılar), and after them, the Mishar Tatars (mişär tatarları, mişärlär). The main separating factor between these groups is their differing dialects. Traditionally however, they are thought to have somewhat different ethnogenetic history.

Both groups are connected to the Golden Horde and its predecessor, Volga Bulgaria. Afterwards, the ancestors of Kazan Tatars formed the Khanate of Kazan, where as the Kasim Khanate was mostly made up of Mishar Tatars. The final formation of each subgroup, with unique features, happened mostly during these khanates. Since then, due to increased contacts with each other, the differences between these groups have lessened.

It has been stated, that Mishars tend to be more symphatetic to Russia due to their "long association with the Russian state". At the same time, Mishar Tatars are thought to be a "faithfully Kipchak" group. Kazan Tatar dialect might have more Bolgar influence while Mishar is closer to Kipchak. Especially the subdialect of Mishar in Nizhny Novgorod Oblast has been emphasized in this regard. Some even propose that Mishar is a Kipchak-Cuman language, rather than Kipchak-Bolgar, which is the usual classification of Tatar.

Kazan Tatars traditionally inhabit the left bank of Volga River and Mishar Tatars the western side. Most Mishars supposedly live in Moscow today. Since the 1926 population census, these groups are not designated separately, but simply as Tatars.

=== Kasimov Tatars ===
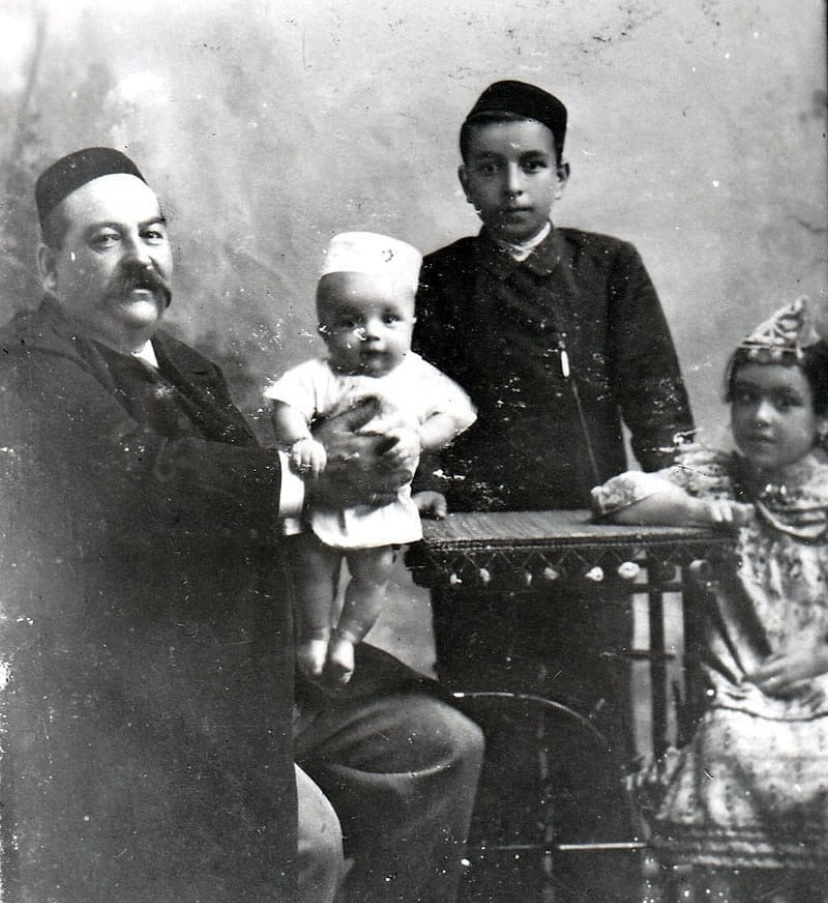
Kasimov Tatar family in Tebenkovo village, late 1800s.

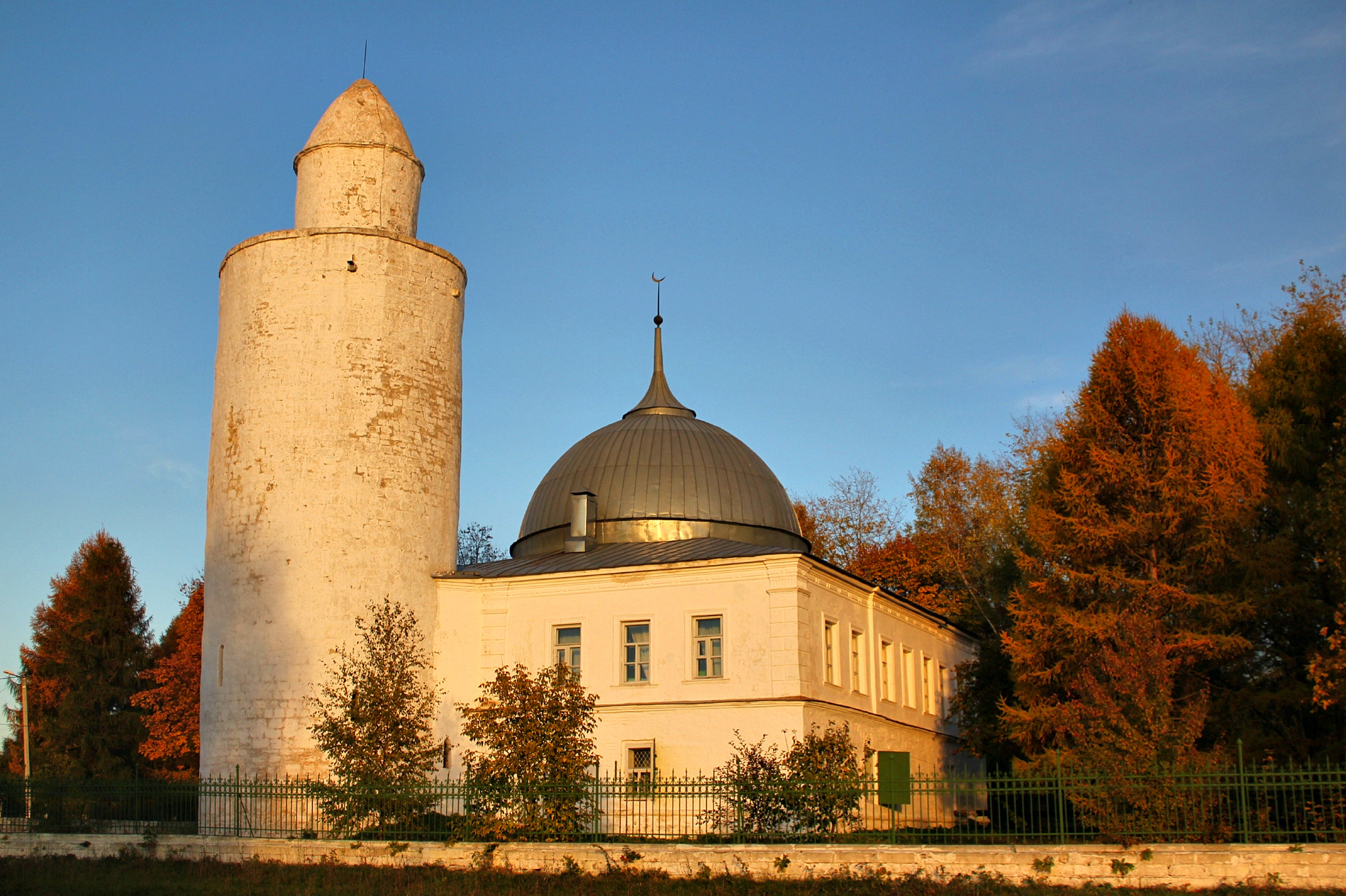
Mosque and minaret in Kasimov.

Kasimov Tatars (Qasıym tatarları) have their capital in the town of Kasimov, Ryazan Oblast. They were formed during the Qasim Khanate. The number of Kasimov Tatars in 2002 was suspected to be less than 1,000. In the late 1800s and early 1900s, some Kasimov Tatars are known to have relocated to the regions of Kazan, Simbirsk, Nizhny Novgorod, Orenburg, and also Central-Asia.

According to S. Ishkhakov, the Kasimov Tatars were an "ethnically transitional group between Kazan Tatars and Mishar Tatars." Kasimov Tatars took part in the Conquest of Kazan and in wars against Sweden in troops of Ivan the Terrible. In some sources, Mishars are called Kasimov Tatars. (They were also largely formed in Qasim Khanate.)

Kasimov Tatars (Self name: Kaçim / Käçim tatarları / xalkı) speak the central (Kazan) dialect of Tatar language. In their dialect there is Mishar and Nogai influence.

The first female Tatar mathematician, graduate of Sorbonne University, Sara Shakulova (1887–1964) is said to have been a Kasimov Tatar.

=== Nukrat Tatars ===
Nukrat Tatars (Noqrat tatarları) live mainly in Udmurtia (Yukamensky, Glazovsky, Balezinsky, Yarsky districts) and Kirov Oblast. They are divided into subgroups Nukrat and Chepetsky. They speak Tatar with characteristic of the southern Udmurt. Their name comes from the village of Noqrat, which was first mentioned in 1542 along with the cities of the Vyatka land. Their formation was influenced by Udmurts and the Besermyan. They practice Islam.

In the 1920s the number of Nukrat Tatars was around 15,000 people.

=== Perm Tatars ===
Perm Tatars (Perm' tatarları), also known as the Ostyaks in Russian sources during 15th and early 17th century, live mainly in the Perm Krai and Sverdlovsk Oblast. The Ostyaks were in the sphere of influence of the Kazan Khanate as a separate ethno-political entity (Ostyak, or Kostyak land). One significant ethnic component of the Perm Tatars was the Nogai-Kipchak population of the Perm region. Also, Kazan Tatars and partly Mishars who moved from the Middle Volga region to the Perm Territory in 16th - early 17th centuries had an influence. Perm Tatars are divided into 4 subgroups: Mullinskaya, Kungurskaya, Tanypovskaya and Krasnoufimskaya. In the early 1900s their number was 52 700 thousand people. Like the Tatar majority, they practice Islam.

=== Kryashens ===
Kryashens (keräşen/keräşennär) are known as the minority Orthodox Christian group of Tatars. A policy of Christianization of the Muslim Tatars was enacted by the Russian authorities, beginning in 1552, resulting in the emergence of Kryashens, also known as "Christianized Tatars". Many Volga Tatars were forcibly Christianized by Ivan the Terrible during the 16th century, and continued to face forced baptisms and conversions under subsequent Russian rulers and Orthodox clergy up to the mid-eighteenth century.

Kryahsen Tatars live in much of the Volga-Ural area. Today, they tend to be assimilated among the Russians and other Tatar groups.

Some of the Kryashens speak the Kazan dialect, others Mishar dialect. In 2010 census, 34,882 identified as Kryashens.

=== Other groups ===
Teptyars (tiptär), Nagaibaks (nağaybäklär) and Astrakhan Tatars (Ästerxan tatarları) can also be included as Volga Tatars according to some.

Teptyars live in Perm Krai, the southeast part of Tatarstan, and northwestern Bashkortostan. Most of them speak the Kazan dialect of Tatar language, and some speak Bashkir. According to one theory, originally Teptyars formed a special peasant group, which, in addition to the Tatars, included Bashkirs, Chuvash, Maris, Udmurts and Mordvins. In 1790, the Teptyars were transferred to the ranks of the military service class, and the Teptyar Regiment was formed. During the Patriotic War of 1812, the 1st Teptyar Regiment under the command of Major Temirov took part in the fighting as part of a separate Cossack troops of Matvei Platov. To this day, there is controversy on whether they should be classified as either Tatars or Bashkirs. In the early 1900s, their number was estimated to be 382 000.

The Nagaibaks live in Chelyabinsk Oblast of Russia. They are Orthodox Christian and multiple researchers think they originated from Christianized Nogais of Nogai Khanate. Other theories exist however. They speak Nagaibak, a sub-dialect of the middle dialect of Tatar. A 2002 census recorded 9 600 Nagaibaks.

Astarkhan Tatars are a regional ethnic group. In 1989, 71 700 Tatars lived in Astrakhan Oblast. They are separated into three subgroups: Jurtov and Kundrov Tatars, and the Karagash. One theory connects the Jurtov and Karagash to Nogai. Another proposes that Jurtov descend from Astarkhan Khanate. A considerable part of the Astrakhan Tatars are descendants of the Volga Tatars who moved to the area in the 18th and 19th centuries. As early as 1702, local Tatar women married Kazan Tatars. At the end of the 18th century, Volga and Ural Tatars began to move to the countryside, where they founded new villages or settled in the same villages with local Tatars. By the beginning of the 20th century, the settlers who mainly mixed with the Jurtov Tatars already made up more than a third of the local Tatar population.

== Population figures ==
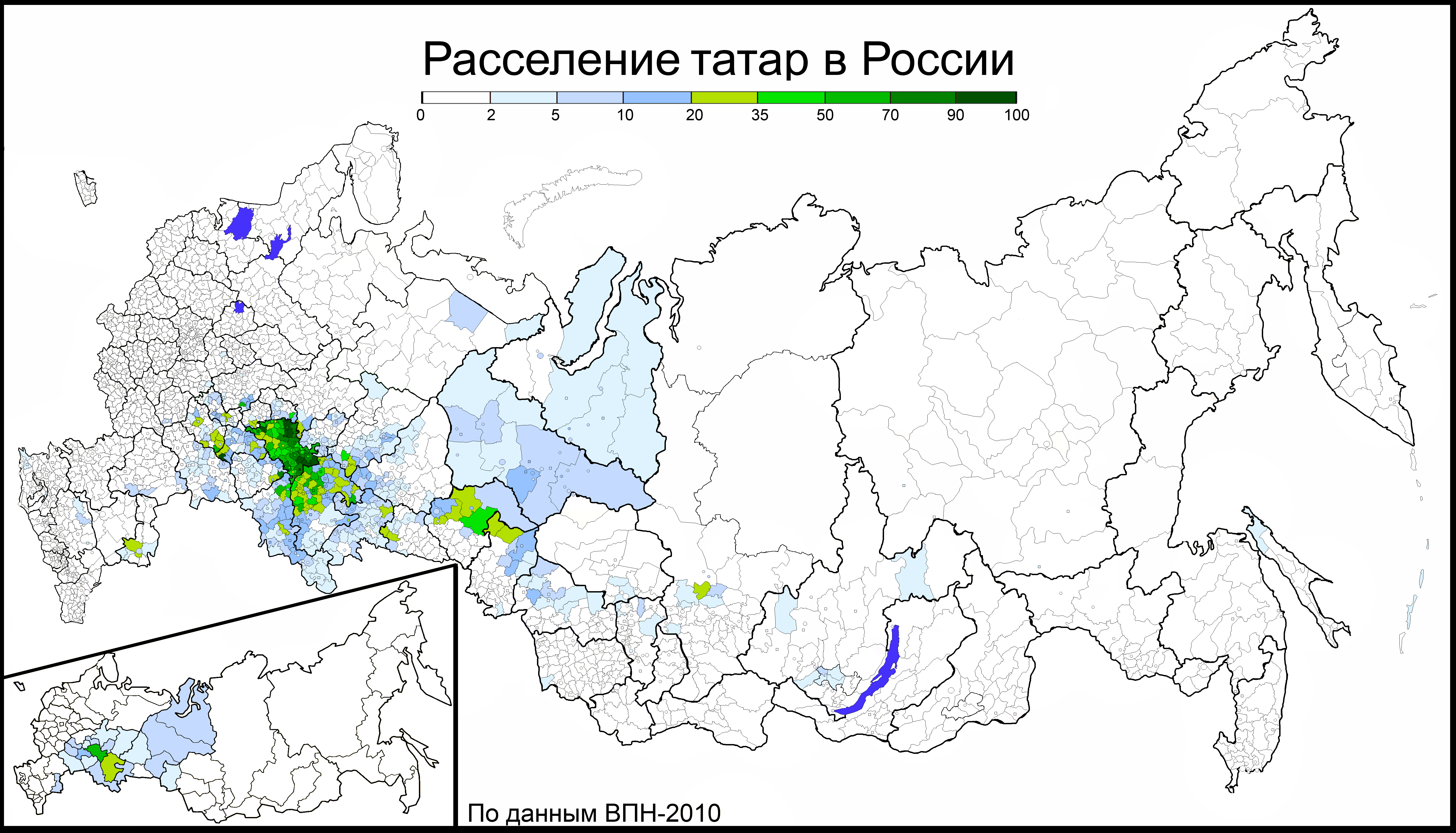
Tatar-inhabited areas in Russia according to the 2010 Russian census

Tatars inhabiting the Republic of Tatarstan, a federal subject of Russia, constitute one third of all Tatars, while the other two thirds reside outside Tatarstan. Some of the communities residing outside Tatarstan developed before the Russian Revolution of 1917, as Tatars were specialized in trading.

In the 1910s, they numbered about half a million in the area of Kazan. Nearly 2 million Volga Tatars died in the 1921–22 famine in Tatarstan. Some 15,000 belonging to the same stem had either migrated to Ryazan in the center of Russia (what is now European Russia) or had been settled as prisoners during the 16th and 17th centuries in Lithuania (Vilnius, Grodno, and Podolia). Some 2,000 resided in Saint Petersburg. Volga-Ural Tatars number nearly 7 million, mostly in Russia and the republics of the former Soviet Union. While the bulk of the population is found in Tatarstan (around 2 million) and neighbouring regions, significant number of Volga-Ural Tatars live in Siberia, Central Asia, and the Caucasus. Outside of Tatarstan, urban Tatars usually speak Russian as their first language (in cities such as Moscow, Saint-Petersburg, Nizhniy Novgorod, Ufa, and cities of the Ural and Siberia).

In 2021, there were 5,310,649 Tatars in Russia.

== Genetics ==
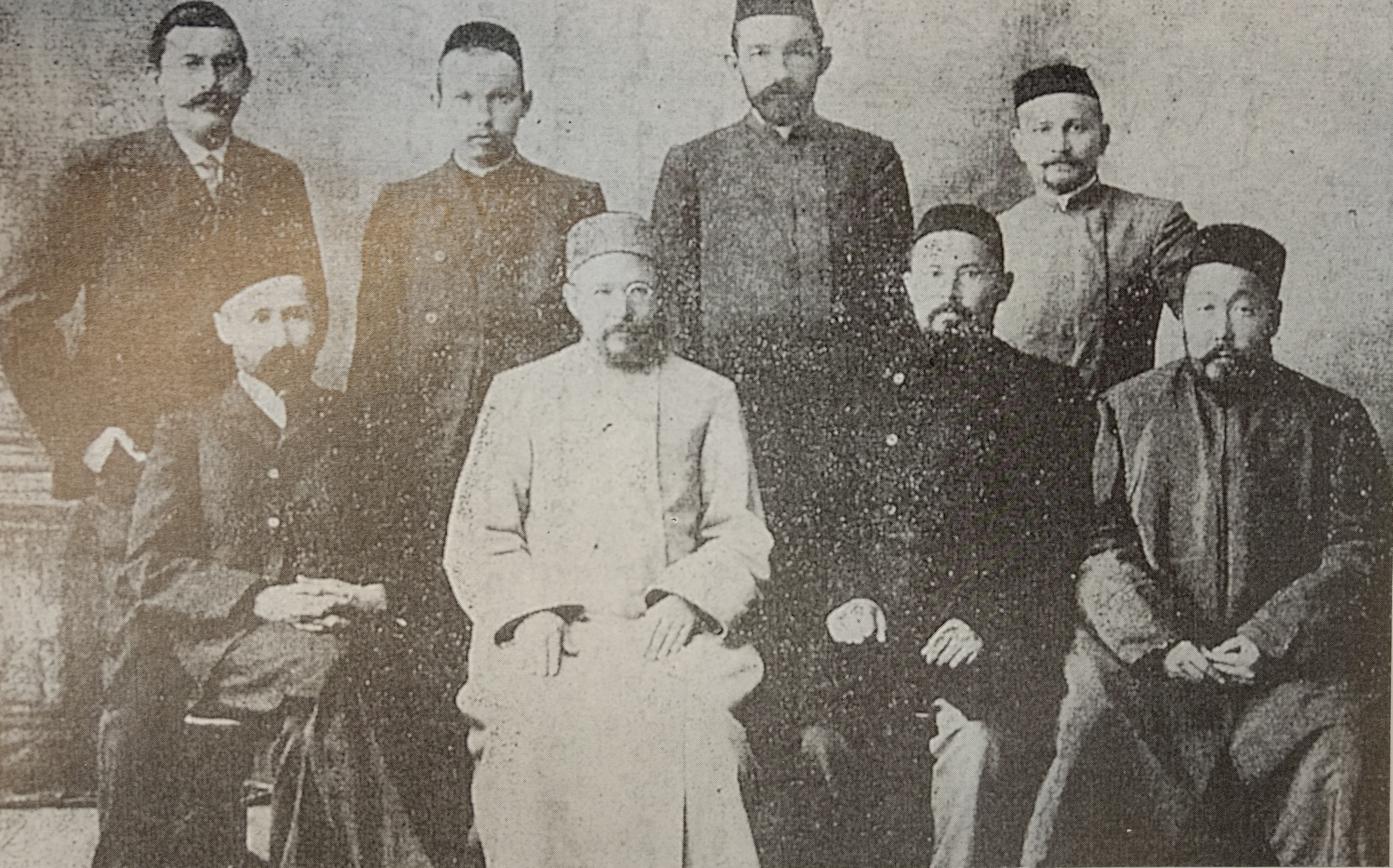
Tatar intelectuals in the Russian Empire.

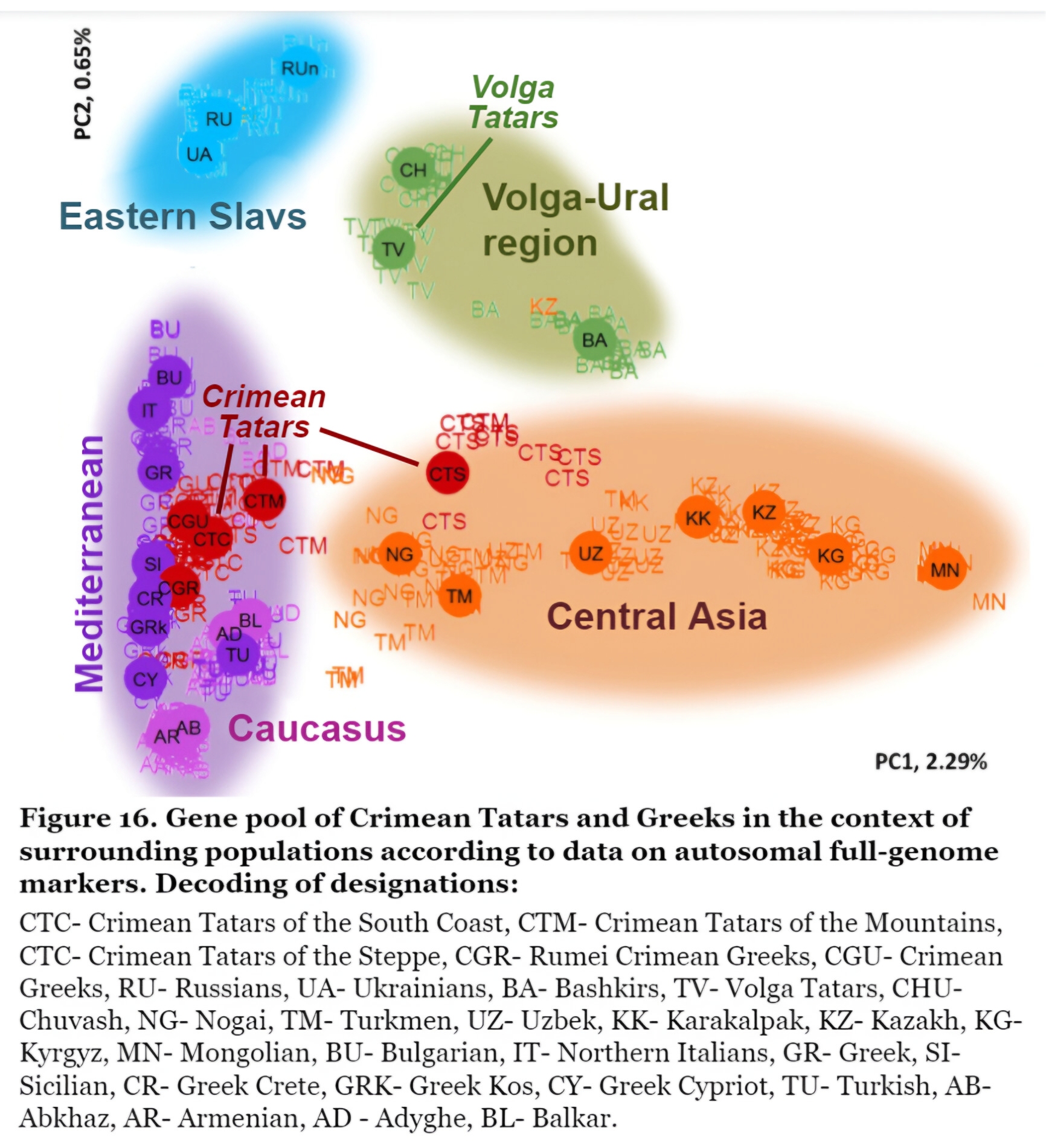
PCA showing relative population affinities of Tatar subgroups.

=== Y-DNA ===
According to over 100 samples from the Tatarstan DNA project, the most common Y-DNA haplogroup of the ethnic Volga Tatars is Haplogroup R1a (over 20%), predominantly from the Asiatic R1a-Z93 subclade. Haplogroup N is the other significant haplogroup. According to different data, J2a or J2b may be the more common subclade of Haplogroup J2 in Volga Tatars. The haplogroups I, Q, E, O, C, G, and L are less frequently represented.

Haplogroups in Volga Tatars (122 samples):

- C2: 2%
- E: 4% (V13: 3%)
- G2a: 2%
- I1: 6%
- I2a1: 5%
- I2a2: 2%
- J2a: 7%
- J2b: 2%
- L1: 2%
- N1c1: 16%
- N1c2: 9%
- O3: 2%
- Q1: 2%
- R1a: 33% (Z282: 19%, Z93: 14%)

=== mtDNA ===
According to Denisova et al. it was found that mtDNA of the Volga Tatars consists of two parts, but western Eurasian mtDNA component prevails considerably (84% on average) over eastern Asian one (16%) among 197 Kazan Tatars and Mishars. The Eastern Eurasian mtDNA component amounts to about 24% in Kazan Tatars and 12% in Mishar Tatars.

=== Autosomal DNA ===
A genetic analysis on genetic data of Hun, Avar and Magyar conqueror samples by Maroti et al. 2022, revealed high genetic affinity between Magyar conquerors and modern day Volga Tatars and Bashkirs. They can be modeled as ~50% Mansi-like, ~35% Sarmatian-like, and ~15% Hun/Xiongnu-like. The admixture event is suggested to have taken place in the Southern Ural region at 643–431 BC.

The study of Suslova et al. found indications of two non-Kipchak sources of admixture, Finno-Ugric and Bulgar:

Together with Tatars, Russians have high frequencies of allele families and haplotypes characteristic of Finno-Ugric populations. This presupposes a Finno-Ugric impact on Russian and Tatar ethnogenesis... Some aspects of HLA in Tatars appeared close to Chuvashes and Bulgarians, thus supporting the view that Tatars may be descendants of ancient Bulgars.

Volga Tatars cluster together with the Karanogays of Dagestan, the Chuvash and Maris.

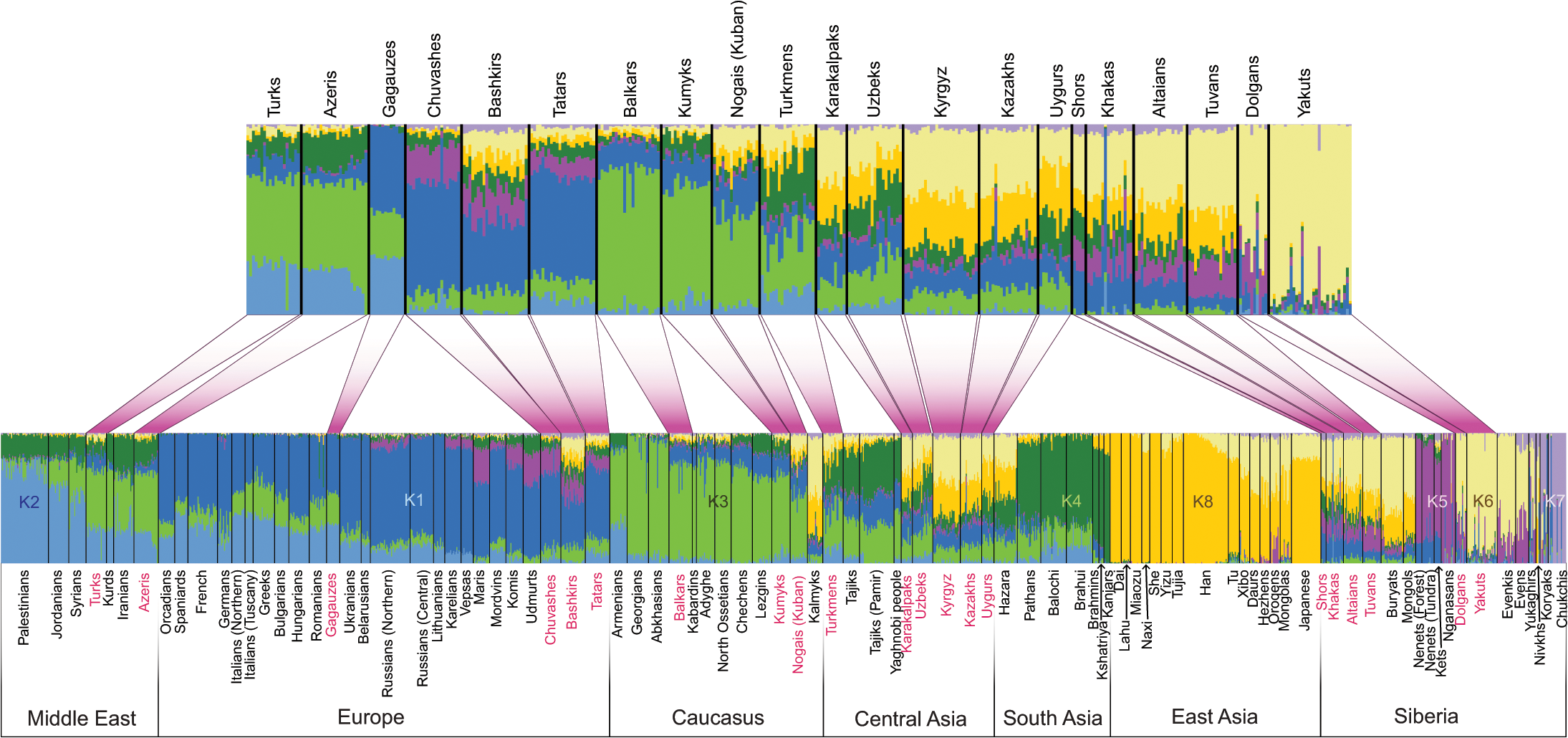
Population structure of Turkic-speaking populations in the context of their geographic neighbors across Eurasia. Volga Tatars derive between 20-30% of their autosomal ancestry from Eastern Eurasian (Siberian and East Asian) groups.

According to a full genome study by Triska et al. 2017, the Volga Tatars are primarily descended from Volga Bulgar tribes "who carried a large Finno-Ugric component", Pechenegs, Kumans, Khazars, and Scythians. The Tatars IBD is shared with various Turkic and Uralic populations, primarily from the Volga-Ural region. The authors suggest that "when the original Finno-Ugric speaking people were conquered by Turkic tribes, both Tatar and Chuvash are likely to have experience language replacement, while retaining their genetic core". The Finno-Ugric groups themselves have previously been found to have formed from local Indo-Europeans and early Uralic-speaking groups.

A 2019 study found that the autosomal admixture of the Volga Tatars can be modeled to be about 70-80% Srubnaya-like and around 20-30% Ulchi-like. The level of Ulchi-like ancestry was slightly higher in Kazan Tatars compared to Mishar Tatars.

Connections to historical Hungarians have been made also, being described to have formed from Western and Eastern Siberian sources.

The three regional groups of Tatars (Volga, Crimean, Siberian) do not have common ancestors and thus, their formation occurred independently of each other.

Main Volga Tatar admix components are 24-46% Conquerors, 20-50% Russians, 16-30% Mansis+Khantys and 9-18% Norwegians.

== Notable Volga Tatars ==
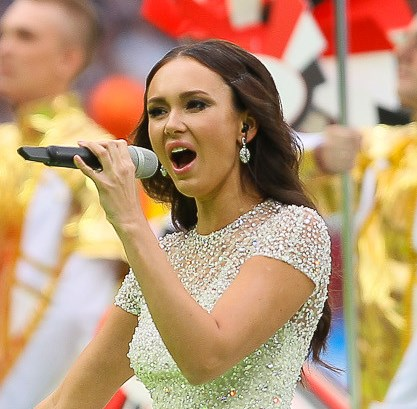
Aida Garifullina, lyric soprano of Volga Tatar descent

- Amirkhan Yeniki – author, poet
- Vadim Abdrashitov – film director
- Dajan Ahmet – actor, director (Estonian Tatar)
- Rinat Akhmetov – billionaire, Ukraine's richest citizen
- Gabdulkhay Akhatov – linguist
- Yusuf Akçura – politician, writer
- Alsou – singer
- Abdulla Aliş – writer, resistance fighter
- Ildar Abdrazakov – opera singer
- Reşit Rahmeti Arat – philologist, professor, writer
- Sadri Maksudi Arsal – politician
- Marat Basharov – actor
- Simeon Bekbulatovich – statesman
- Musa Bigiev – philosopher, theologian
- Zinetula Bilyaletdinov – hockey player, coach
- Fauziya Bayramova – politician, writer
- Saadet Çağatay – turkologist
- Näcip Cihanov – composer
- Musa Cälil – poet, resistance fighter
- Ymär Daher – cultural worker, researcher (Finnish Tatar)
- Rinat Fakhretdinov – mixed martial artist
- Rizaeddin bin Fakhreddin – scholar, publicist
- Emil Galimov – hockey player
- Aida Garifullina – singer
- Rawil Ğaynetdin – Mufti
- Ismagil Gainutdinov – architect
- Ildar Gilmutdinov – politician
- Chulpan Khamatova – actress
- Aisa Hakimcan – artist (Finnish Tatar)
- Ğälimcan İbrahimov – writer
- Alimcan Idris – theologian, reporter
- Airat Ichmouratov - composer, orchestra conductor
- Ğayaz İsxaqıy – writer, journalist, politician
- Äxmät İsxaq – poet, translator, journalist
- Ramilya Iskander – actress, model
- Näqi İsänbät – writer
- Marat Izmailov – footballer
- Nail Yakupov – hockey player
- Guzel Yakhina – author, screenwriter
- Ghabdennasir Qursawi – theologian, Jadidist
- Ğädel Qutuy – poet, writer, playwright
- Aliya Mustafina – artistic gymnast
- Elmir Nabiullin - footballer
- Elvira Nabiullina – economist
- Rashid Nezhmetdinov – chess player
- Rudolf Nureyev – ballet dancer
- Rashid Nurgaliyev – general, politician
- Ğäliäsğar Kamal – playwright
- Dmitry Karbyshev – officer, general (Kryashen)
- Sara Sadíqova – actress, singer, composer
- Marat Safin – tennis player, politician
- Timur Safin – foil fencer
- Fandas Safiullin – politician
- Emil Sayfutdinov – speedway rider
- Habiburrahman Shakir – Imam, theologian (Finnish Tatar)
- Amina Hanum Syrtlanoff – theosophist, mason
- Sahib-Garey Said-Galiev – revolutionary, politician
- Irina Shayk – model
- Salix Säydäş – composer, conductor
- Mirsaid Sultan-Galiyev – revolutionary
- Talgat Tadzhuddin – Shaykh al-Islām, Grand Mufti
- Kärim Tinçurin – playwright
- Ğabdulla Tuqay – poet
- Baqi Urmançe – painter, sculptor
- Gaisa Enikeev – teacher, ethnographer, politician
- Färit Yarullin – composer
- Röstäm Yaxin – composer
- Kamila Valieva – figure skater
- Räşit Wahapov – singer
- Fatix Ämirxan – writer, editor, publicist
- Ildar Akhmetzyanov – footballer
- Alina Zagitova – figure skater

== Diaspora ==
=== United States ===
The Volgar Tatar diaspora has several associations in the United States, such as:

- Tatars of Washington State
- The American Tatar Association
- The American Turko-Tatar Association

=== Finland ===
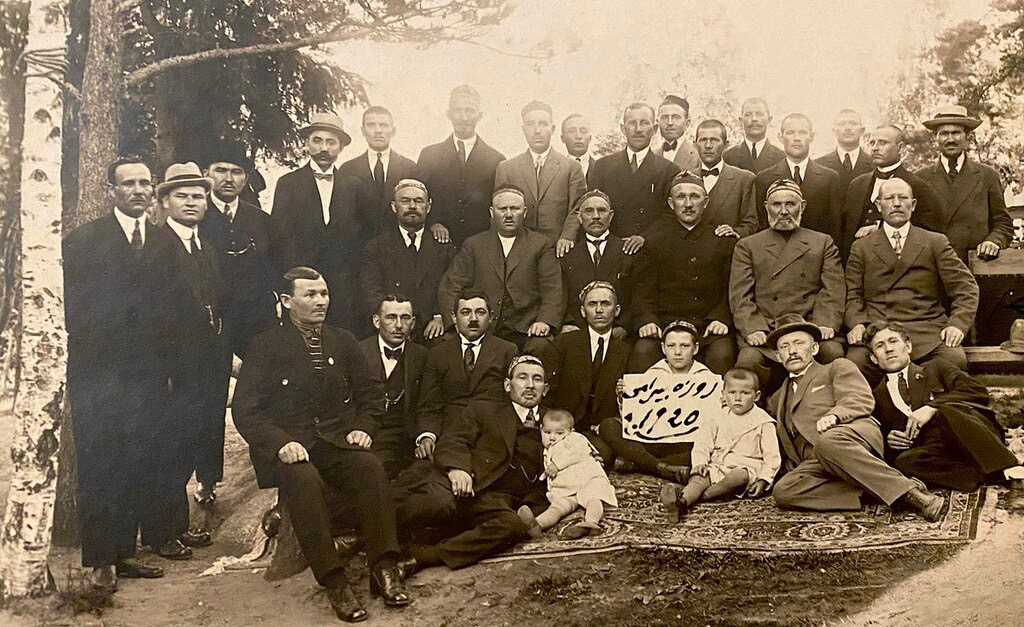
Tatars in Helsinki during Eid al-Fitr 1920.

The Finnish Tatar community was formed when Mishar Tatar merchants settled in the country in the late 1800s and early 1900s. They were born in Nizhny Novgorod Oblast (then-Governorate) and majority in the same village, Aktuk.

The Finnish Tatars number approximately 600–700 today. Mixed marriages with the Finnish people have increased drastically, but the Tatar culture is still very active and alive according to its members. The Finnish Tatars have their own associations and a congregation. Many notable politicians have visited the Finnish-Islamic Congregation in Helsinki, such as Recep Tayyip Erdoğan. A separate and smaller congregation is the Tampere Tatar Congregation. Its imam during 1947–1975 was the respected theologian Habiburrahman Shakir.

In 2024, Туңган як: Суоми (Tuñğan yaq: Suomi), a documentary about the modern Finnish Tatar community, made by Kazan Tatars Rədif Kaşapov and İlyas Gafarov was uploaded on Youtube. The Turkish TRT Belgesel made a documentary Özü Türk: Finlandiya'daki Tatarlar in 2007.

== See also ==
- Tatars
- Tatar cuisine
- Turkic Christians
- Sabantuy
- Bulgarism
- Tatar nobility
- Crimean Tatars
- Siberian Tatars
- Lipka Tatars
- Chinese Tatars
- Finnish Tatars
- Tatars of Kazakhstan
- Tatars in Canada
- Tartary
- Little Tartary
- Idel-Ural State
