= Amirkhan =

Amirkhan may refer to:

- Amirkhan, Iran, a village in North Khorasan Province, Iran
- Fatix Ämirxan (1886–1926), Tatar writer
- Amirkhan Yeniki (1909–2000), Tatar writer
