= Fatix Säyfi-Qazanlı =

Russian public figure and writer

- Born: 22 March 1888; Qaramalı
- Died: 3 August 1937 (aged 49); Moscow
- Resting place: Donskoye Cemetery
- Occupation: Writer
- Spouse(s): Abruy Säyfi

Fatix Säyfi-Qazanlı (Tatar: Фатих Сәйфи-Казанлы, فاتح سيفى-قازانلى, Tatar pronunciation: [fɑˈtɪχ sæjˈfi-qɑzanˈlɯ]; 1888–1938) was a Russian public figure and writer. Executed during the Great Purge, he was subsequently rehabilitated.

== Biography ==
Fatix Säyfi was born on March 22, 1888, in the village of Qaramalı to a middle-class peasant family. During the famine of 1891–1892 his family moved to Kazan, where Säyfi studied at Möxämmädiä madarasa. After graduating from the madrasa, he worked as a teacher in Minzälä Uyezd; then he returned to Kazan to work as a journalist, collaborating with various Tatar-language newspapers and journals, such as Yoldız, Tormış, Añ, Yalt-Yolt and Aq yul. In 1912, Säyfi moved to Ufa and worked as a history lecturer in Ğäliä madrasa between 1915 and 1917.

After the February Revolution Säyfi-Qazanlı began to engage in political activities. Together with Ğalimcan İbrahimof and Şärif Sünçäläy he began to publish a newspaper called İrek (Freedom). In June 1917 he participated in the Second All-Russian Muslim Congress; the same year he was elected to Millät Mäclese, where he was a member of Tupraqçılar (supporters of territorial autonomy) faction and participated in the activities of its finance, legislative, mandate, and territorial autonomy commissions. He was also elected to the Central Committee of the Tatar Socialist Revolutionary Party.

In 1918, Säyfi-Qazanlı returned to Kazan and began to work in the Central Muslim Comissariat led by Mullanur Waxitov. During the Russian Civil War he taught history and social sciences, as well as military-political and military red commander training courses, at technical schools and other institutions and at the same time actively wrote in the first Tatar Soviet newspapers such as Eşçe (Moscow) and Eş (Kazan). In 1920 he became a member of the Communist Party.

After the creation of the Tatar ASSR he worked at its People's Commissariats of Education and Agriculture. In 1923–1925 he was the chief editor of the Qızıl Tatarstan newspaper.

Being an active supporter of Latinisation of the Tatar language, Fatix Säyfi-Qazanlı was elected chairman of the Jaꞑalif Society, the aim of which was the transfer of the Tatar script from Arabic script to Latin script. As the chairman of the society and editor-in-chief of its journal, also called Jaꞑalif (1927–1929), he played one of the most active roles in the implementation of the new script.

In 1930–1935, he worked in various educational institutions of Kazan.

In 1936, Fatix Säyfi-Qazanlı was arrested as a part of a falsified case of the Counter-Revolutionary Trotskyist-Nationalist Terrorist Organization. He was sentenced to death on August 3, 1937, by the Military Collegium of the Supreme Court of the USSR and executed the same day. He was rehabilitated in 1958.

== Literary works ==
Säyfi-Qazanlı's literary works include:

- plays (Bezneñ zaman (Our time, 1912), Yämsez tormış (Ugly life, 1915), Doşmannar (Enemies, 1921), Zäquan mulla şäcäräse (The Genealogy of Zäquan Mullah, 1929) and others).
- stories and novels (Zimagur (A stranger, 1921), Öç narat (Three pines, 1930), Berençe adımnar (First steps, 1933) and others).

His works addressed the dark side of the old life in the post-revolutionary years, and the events of the civil war and socialist construction, and kolkhozization era. These works have a special place in the history of Tatar literature as literary reflections of the life of that period, the phenomena of class struggle, and the characteristics of the birth and formation of a new person in those conditions.

He also wrote articles about literary works of Ğabdulla Qarıyef, Şäyexzädä Babiç, Mäcit Ğafuri, Şamil Ğosman and others; in his work called Öç tatar klassige (Three Tatar classics, 1929) Säyfi-Qazanlı examined literary works of Fatix Ämirxan, Ğäliäsğar Kamal and Säğit Sünçäläy. He participated in the preparation for publication of the collected works of Ğabdulla Tuqay and Ğäliäsğar Kamal. Fatix Säyfi-Qazanlı was also the author of books and booklets about the history of Tatarstan, Russia, the French Revolution, history textbooks for secondary schools and articles of an atheistic nature.

== Family ==
He was married to Abruy Säyfi, a journalist, translator and writer.
