= Volga Tatar =

Volga Tatar may refer to:

- Volga Tatar language
- Volga Tatars
