= Ğälimcan İbrahimov =

Tatar public figure, writer and linguist

- Галимҗан Ибраһимов
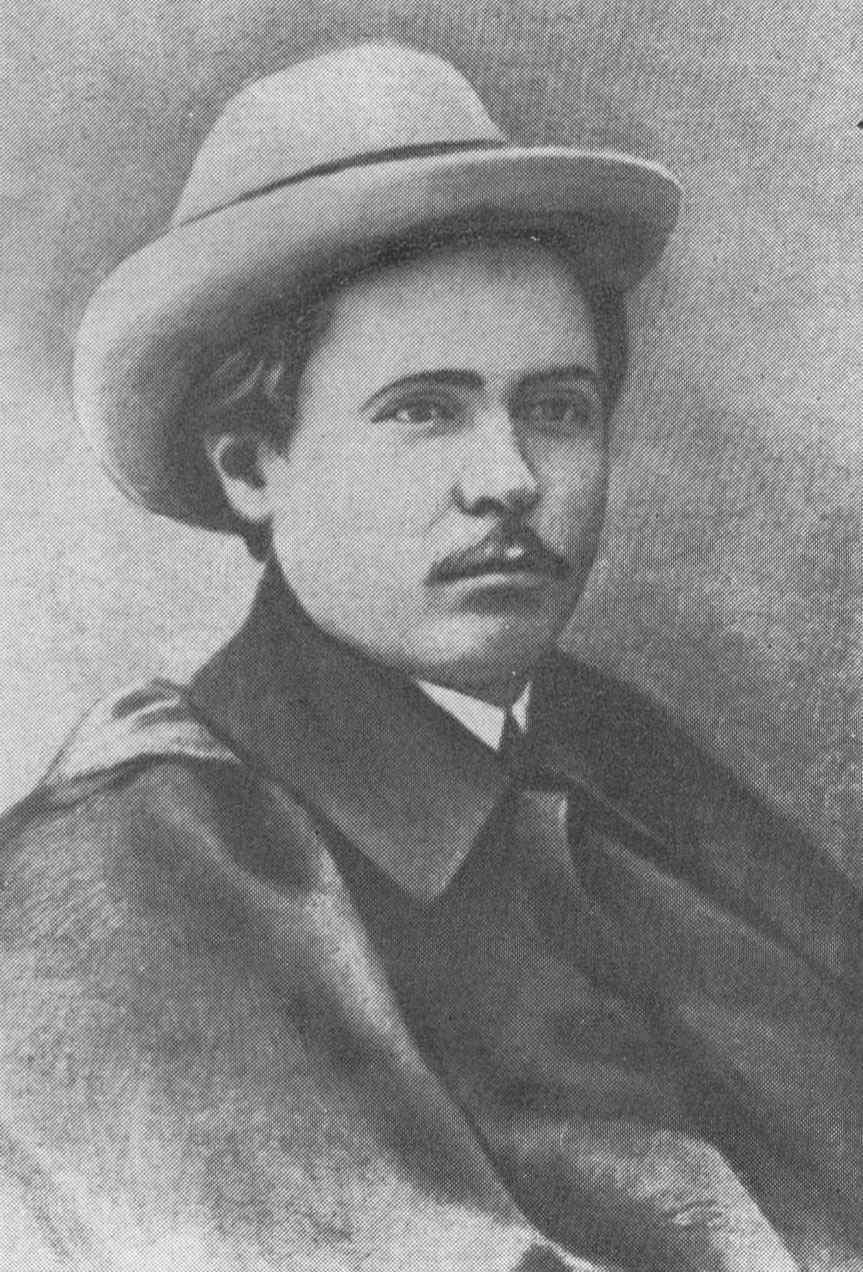
- Born: 12 March [O.S. 28 February] 1887; Sultanmuratovo, Sterlitamaksky Uyezd, Ufa Governorate, Russian Empire
- Died: 12 January 1938 (aged 50); Kazan, Tatar ASSR, Russian SFSR, Soviet Union
- Occupations: writer; linguist

Ğälimcan İbrahimov (Tatar: Галимҗан Ибраһимов, عالمجان ابراهيمف; 1887–1938) was a Tatar public figure, writer and linguist. The Institute of Language, Literature and Art of the Tatarstan Academy of Sciences is named after him.

== Biography ==
Ğälimcan İbrahimov was born in 1887 in the village of Sultanmuratovo in the family of Ğirfan İbrahimov, who was an imam in this village, and his wife, Bibixäsänä. He received his primary education from his father, then he studied in the madrasah of Keşänle, and in the Russian-language zemstvo school in Soltanmorat. In 1898–1905 and 1906–1908 he studied at Wäliä (Orendurg) and Ğäliä (Ufa) madrasahs respectively. After İbrahimof was expelled from Ğäliä, he collaborated with various Tatar-language newspapers, such as Älislax, Yoldız, Waqıt, and Añ, and worked as a teacher in modern-day Qazaqstan, Ural, and vicinities of Ästerxan. In 1912–1913, İbrahimov attended Kiev University as a free listener but was arrested by the police for participating in the underground Muslim revolutionary circle and remained under surveillance until the February Revolution. Upon release from prison, he worked as an executive secretary of Añ journal (Qazan); then, in 1915, İbrahimov began to work as a teacher in the Ğäliä madrasah.

After the February Revolution, İbrahimov, together with Fatix Säyfi-Qazanlı and Şärif Sünçäläy began to publish a newspaper called İrek (Freedom); the same year he was elected to Millät Mäclese, where he was a member of the Tupraqçılar (supporters of territorial autonomy) faction and participated in the activities of its legislative and financial commissions. He was also elected a deputy of the Russian Constituent Assembly from Ufa Governorate. In 1918 together with Mullanur Waxitof and Şärif Manatof participated in the creation of the Commissariat for Muslim Affairs of Inner Russia under the RSFSR's People's Commissariat for Nationalities. In 1919–1920 İbrahimov was a member of the Central Muslim Military Collegium, head of the Press Department Editorial Board of the Central Bureau of Communist Organizations of the Peoples of the East under the Central Committee of the RCP(b), and an employee of the Qızıl Şäreq (Red East) magazine.

From 1920, he worked at the People's Commissariat of Education of Tatar ASSR, and was the chief editor of Bezneñ yul (Our way) and Mäğärif (Education) journals. In 1925–1927, İbrahimof was a head of Academic Center of the People's Commissariat of the Republic Education of Tatar ASSR.

He retired in 1927 due to illness in 1927 and lived in Yalta (Crimea) until 1937, when he was arrested as a part of falsified case of "right-wing Trotskyite anti-soviet nationalist organization." İbrahimof was transferred to Qazan's Pelätän prison and died shortly after in its hospital of pulmonary tuberculosis and tuberculous pleurisy. He was posthumously rehabilitated in 1955

The İbrahimov Institute of Language, Literature and Art at the Tatarstan Academy of Sciences is named after him. There is a museum dedicated to İbrahimov in his home village.

== Works ==
İbrahimof's first literary work, Zäki şäkertneñ mädräsädän quıluı, was published in Älislax newspaper in 1907. Other works indclude Yäş yöräklär (Young hearts, 1912), Bezneñ könnär (Our days, 1919), Qazaq qızı (Kazakh girl, 1924), Tirän tamırlar (Deep roots, 1928) novels, Tatar xatını nilär kürmi (Tatar woman's fate, 1910), Qızıl çäçäklär (Red flowers, 1921), Ädämnär (People, 1923, dedicated to events related to the famine in the Volga area) stories, Yaña keşelär (New people, 1920) play, etc. His collected works were published in 1974–1987 and in 2000 in Qazan.

İbrahimof wrote works on Tatar philology and linguistics, such as Tatar sarıfı (Tatar grammar, 1911), Tatar telen niçek uqıtırğa? (How to teach the Tatar language?, 1916), İmlä-xäref mäs'äläse (The matter of spelling, 1924). Also, Ibrahimof wrote articles about Şihabetdin Märcani, Qäyüm Nasıyri, and historical and publicistic works on revolutionary movement among Tatars.
