= Gaisa Enikeev =

Gaisa Enikeev Russian: Гайса Еникеев Tatar: Гайсә Еникеев
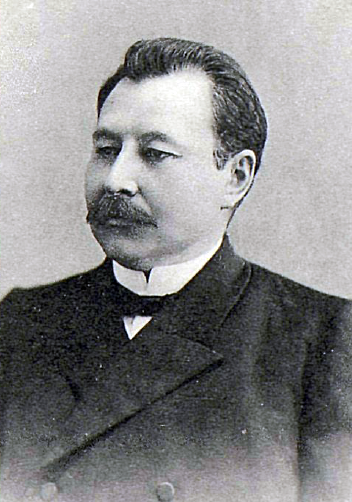
- 1910

Deputy of the Third Imperial Duma
- In office 1 November 1907 – 9 June 1912
- Monarch: Nicholas II

Personal details
- Born: Gaisa Khamidullovich Enikeev; 2 July 1864 Orenburg Governorate, Russian Empire
- Died: March 1931 Ufa, Russian Empire
- Party: Constitutional Democratic Party

Gaisa Khamidullovich Enikeev (Russian: Гайса Хамиду́ллович Енике́ев, Tatar: Гайса Хәмидулла улы Еникеев, romanized: Ğäysä Xämidulla ulı Yenikeev; July 2, 1864, Orenburg Governorate — March 1931, Ufa) was a Tatar teacher, ethnographer, and deputy of the State Duma in its third and fourth convocations from the Kazan and Orenburg Governorates from 1907 to 1917.

Enikeev paid special attention to the protection of the interests of the Muslim population of Russian Empire. Prior to his election to the Duma, he served as the director of a cloth factory in Simbirsk Governorate and the chief administrator of the charitable and educational institutions of Kazan. He was a member of the Provisional Committee of the State Duma in the period of the February Revolution and the organizer of the First All-Russian Muslim Congress in May 1917. During the Soviet era, he was a member of the board of the Vyatka Commissariat of Education and an inspector of Bashselkhozkredit; became also known as a professional connoisseur of Tatar and Bashkir folklore.

Gaisa Enikeev is buried in the Muslim cemetery of Ufa.

== Literature ==
- Еникеев Гайса Хамидуллович (in Russian) // Государственная дума Российской империи: 1906—1917 / Б. Ю. Иванов, А. А. Комзолова, И. С. Ряховская. — Москва: РОССПЭН, 2008. — P. 184—185. — 735 p. — ISBN 978-5-8243-1031-3.
- Члены Государственной думы: (портреты и биографии): Четвертый созыв, 1912—1917 г. / сост. М. М. Боиович. — Москва: Тип. Т-ва И. Д. Сытина, 1913. — P. 208. — LXIV, 454, [2] p. (in Russian)
- Ихтисамов Х. С., Ямаева Л. А. Еникеев Гайса Хамидуллович (in Russian) // Башкирская энциклопедия. — Уфа: ГАУН «Башкирская энциклопедия», 2013. — ISBN 978-5-88185-306-8.
