= Bulgarism =

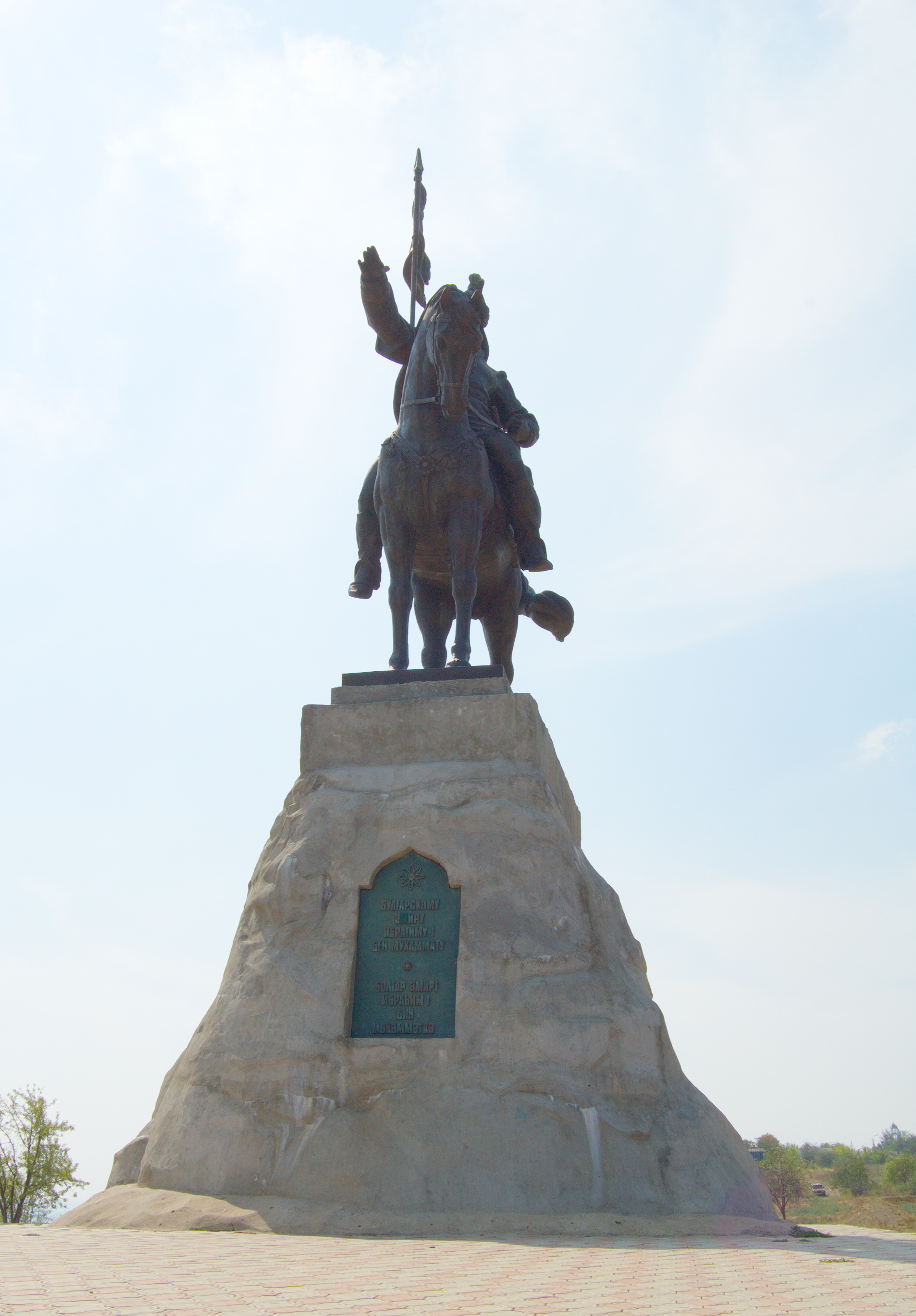
A 2007 monument to emir Ibrahim ibn Muhammad, a ruler of Volga Bulgaria, founder of Elabuga

Bulgarism is an ideology aimed at the "revival of Bulgars' national identity" and Volga Bulgaria statehood. It originated in the second half of 19th century within the Wäisi movement and the Society for the study of the native land (Chuvashia). It was revived at the end of the 20th century as "neobulgarism" in Tatarstan, Bashkortoston and Chuvashia.

The ideology is based on the theory that Volga Tatars, Bashkirs and Chuvash descend from Volga Bulgars. The theory was supported by the Soviet authorities in mid-20th century as an alternative to the "reactionary" theory claiming the Golden Horde descent.

In the 21st century, the ideas of Bulgarism have been revived through the activities of Neo-Bulgarists.

== See also ==
- Cäğfär Taríxı
