= Räşit Wahapov =

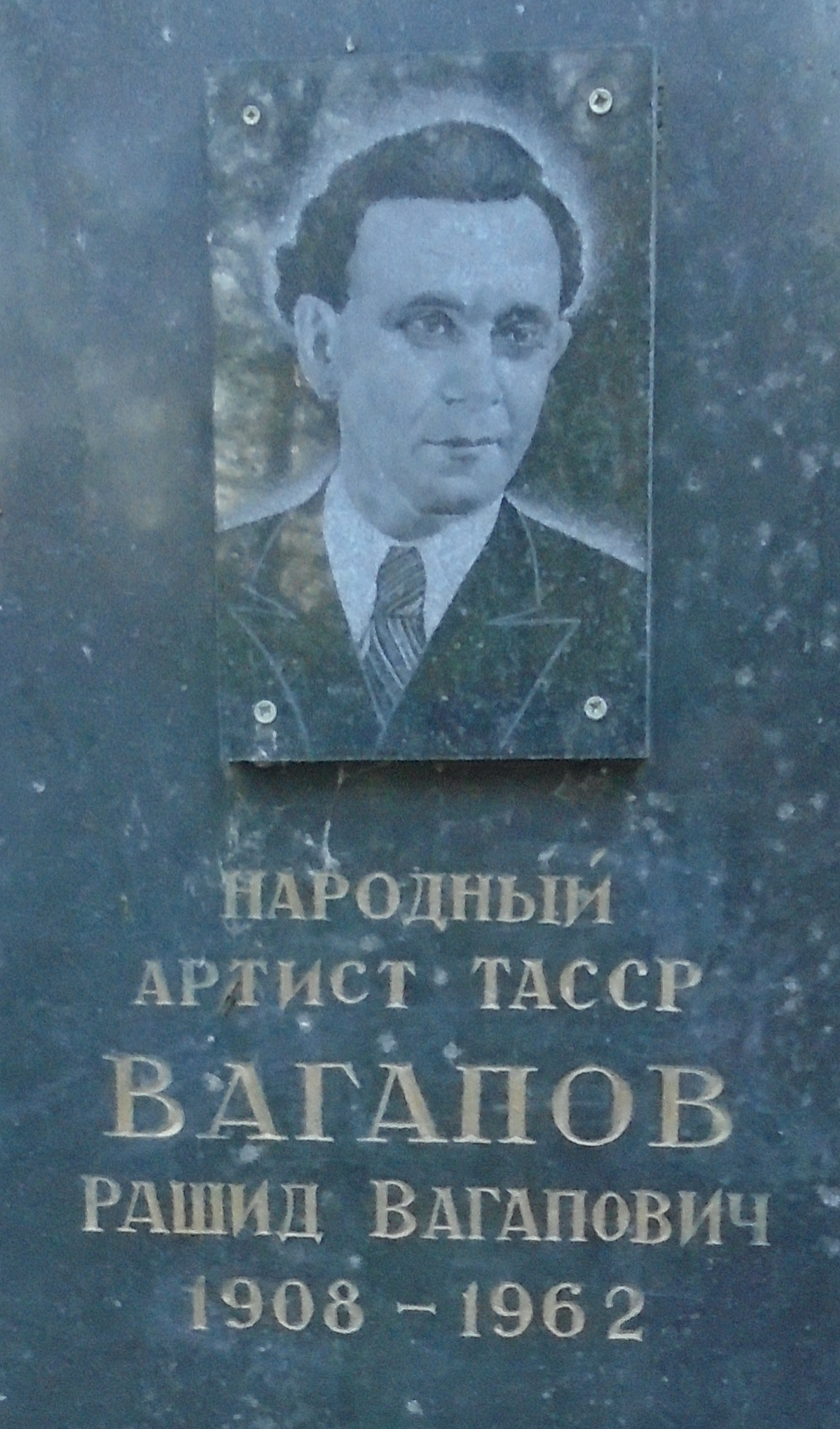
Gravestone in Kazan, Tatarstan.

Räşit Wahap ulı Wahapov (Рәшит Ваһап улы Ваһапов, Russian: Раши́д Вага́пович Вага́пов, romanized: Rashid Vagapovich Vagapov; May 7, 1908–December 14, 1962) was a singer (tenor), awarded with People's Artist of TASSR (1957). Wahapov was "one of the most actively and successfully performing Tatar singers in 1940s and enjoyed enormous popularity among a wide listening audience". In Kazan, capital of Tatarstan, a street is named after the singer.

== Early life ==
Wahapov was born in a village called Aktuk, located in Nizhny Novgorod Oblast.

== Career ==
He was awarded People's Artist of TASSR (1957). In 1941-1962 he was a soloist of the Tatar Philharmonic Society. He performed Tatar folk songs as well as songs by composers such as Sälix Säydäşev, Cäwdät Fäyzi, and Mansur Mozaffarov.

The festival of Tatar song, named after Wahapov, is held every year.

== Sources ==
- "Рәшит Ваһапов". Tatar Encyclopaedia (in Tatar). Kazan: The Republic of Tatarstan Academy of Sciences. Institution of the Tatar Encyclopaedia. 2002.
