= Amirkhan Yeniki =

Poet and Author

Əmirxan Yeniki
- Әмирхан Еники; Амирхан Еники
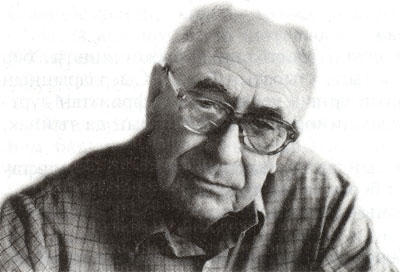
- Born: Əmirxan Niğmətcan ulı Yeniki (Yenikiev); 2 March 1909; Ufa Governorate, Russian Empire
- Died: 16 February 2000 (aged 90); Kazan, Tatarstan
- Other name: Emirhan Yeniki (Turkish spelling)

Amirkhan Yeniki (Russian: Амирхан Нигметзянович Еники / Еникеев, lit. 'Amirkhan Nigmetzyanovich Yeniki / Yenikeev', Tatar: Әмирхан Нигъмәтҗан улы Еники / Еникиев, romanized: Əmirxan Niğmətcan ulı Yeniki / Yenikiev; 2 March 1909, Ufa Governorate – 16 February 2000, Kazan) was a Tatar poet and author, one of the "important names of modern Tatar storytelling", who received the literary state prize of Tatarstan. Yeniki also worked as a translator of authors such as Gogol, Ostrovski and Aitmatov.

== Works ==
- Ozın köy tıñlağanda (Озын көй тыңлаганда, 1926)
- Bala (Бала, 1941)
- Ana həm qız (Ана һәм кыз, 1942)
- Mək çəçəge (Мәк чәчәге, 1944)
- Ber genə səğətkə (Бер генә сәгатькә, 1944)
- Tawlarğa qarap (Тауларга карап, 1948)
- Kem cırladı (Кем җырлады, 1956)
- Yalğızlıq (Ялгызлык, 1957)
- Rəxmət, iptəşlər (Рәхмәт, иптәшләр, 1952)
- Saz çəçəge (Саз чәчәге, 1955)
- Yörək sere (Йөрәк сере, 1957)
- Rəşə (Рәшә, 1962)
- Tönge tamçılar (Төнге тамчылар, 1964)
- Əytelməgən wasıyət (Әйтелмәгән васыять, 1965)
- Wöcdan (Вөҗдан, 1968)
- Göləndəm tutaş xatirəse (Гөләндәм туташ хатирәсе, 1977)
- Xəterdəge töyennər (Хәтердәге төеннәр, 1983)
- Soñğı kitap (Соңгы китап, 1986)
- Qoyaş bayır aldınnan (Кояш баер алдыннан, 1996)
