= Galiaskar Kamal Tatar Academic Theatre =

Tatar theater in Kazan, Tatarstan, Russia

Coordinates: 55°46′58″N 49°07′01.05″E

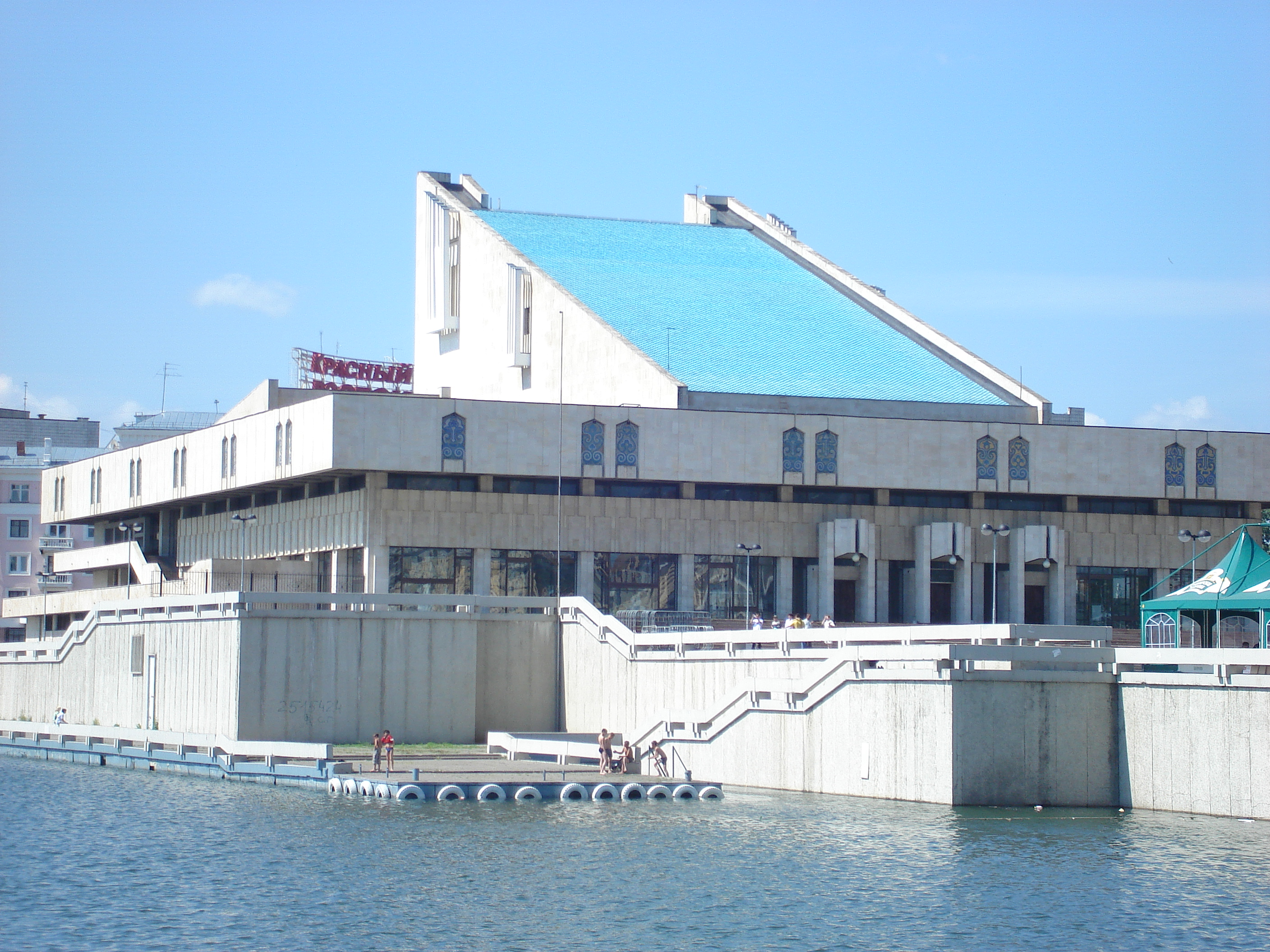
View of the Kamal Theatre from across Lakes Qaban

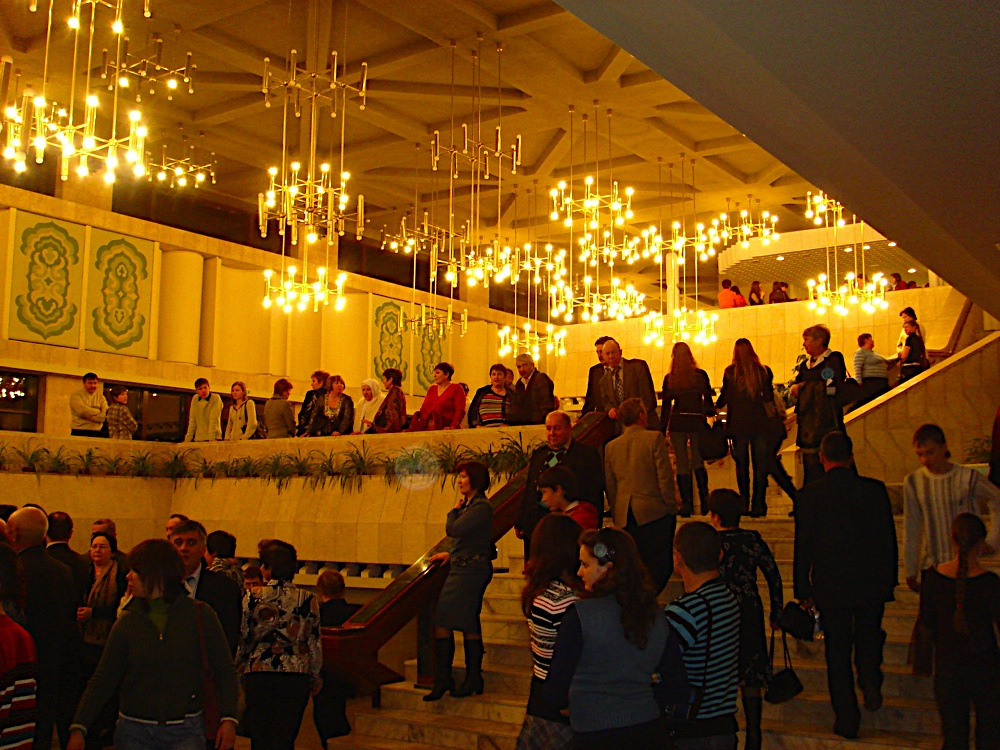
Theatre foyer during intermission

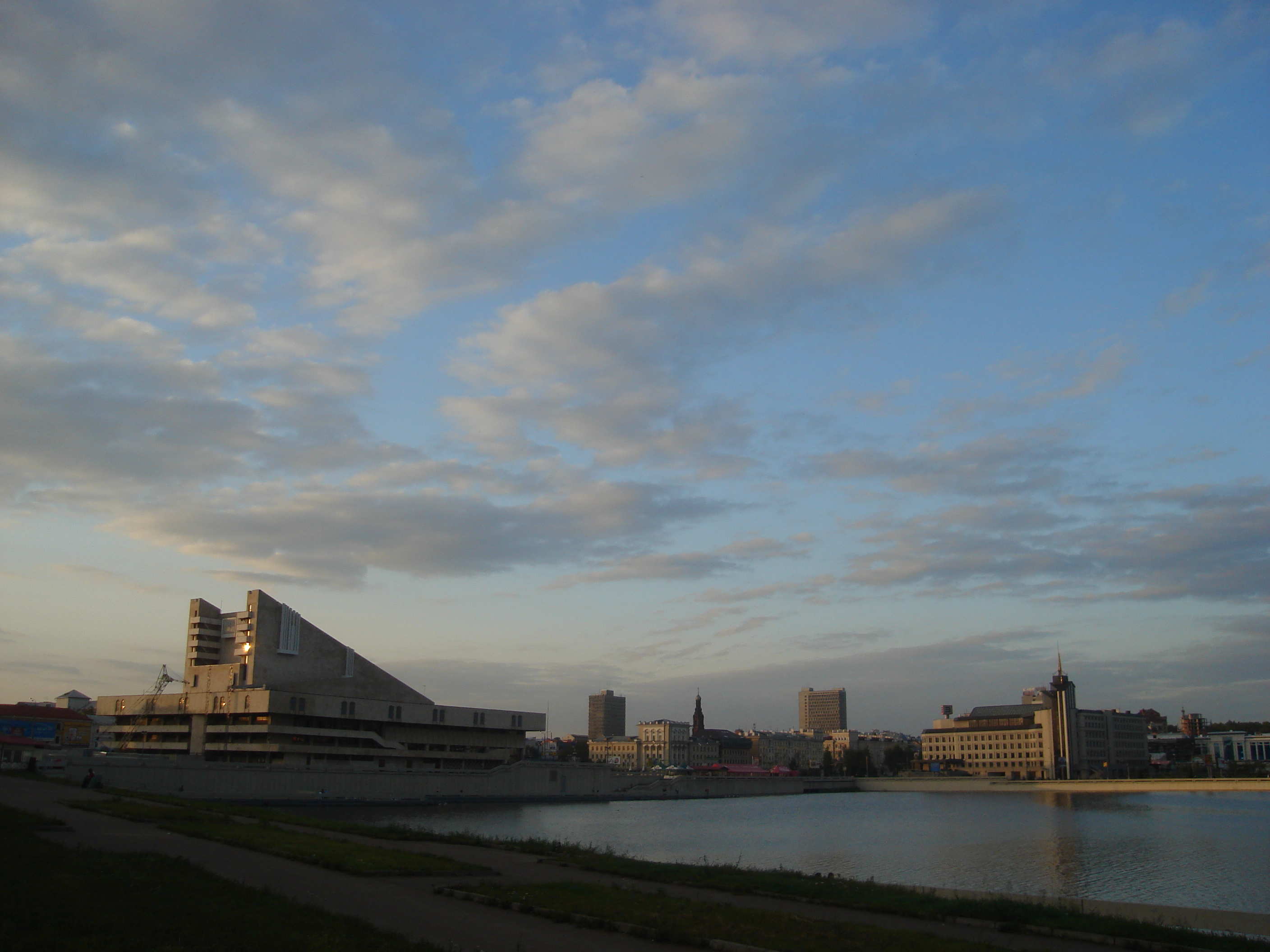
View of Lake Kaban and the Kamal Theatre

The Galiaskar Kamal Tatar Academic Theatre (Russian: Татарский Академический Театр имени Галиаскара Камала, Tatar: Галиәсгар Камал исемендәге татар дәүләт академия театры, romanized: Ğäliäsğar Qamal isemendäge tatar däwlät aqademiyä teatrı) is the leading Tatar theater in Kazan, Russia. Named after the playwright Galiaskar Kamal, it was founded on December 22, 1906.

The first known Tatar theatrical efforts were during the 19th century when Tatar amateur theater groups emerged in some cities and towns of Russia with sizable Tatar populations. The first published Tatar-language play was "Unhappy Girl" (1886) by Gabdrakhman Ilyasi (1856–1895), written perhaps under the influence of the first Turkish playwright İbrahim Şinasi and his play "Şair Evlenmesi" (A Poet's Marriage) which was published in 1860. Both plays deal with the problem of arranged marriages which were very common at that time.

In the middle of the 19th century, Tatar amateur theater groups staged free performances in private houses and were attended by very few people. Their repertoire usually included the plays of Russian and foreign playwrights. The first public performance of a Tatar play in modern times took place in 1906 and was organized by the group "Sayar" (The Traveler). "Sayar" eventually became the leading Tatar professional theater company. In 1939 it was renamed after the playwright Galiaskar Kamal. In 1987, the company moved to its current building on the shore of the lakes Qaban.

The theater's current repertoire consists mostly of plays written by Tatar playwrights but includes many plays of Russian and foreign playwrights as well.

The theater provides special translation devices to audience members who do not understand Tatar.

One of the peculiar features of Tatar culture during Soviet times was that Tatarstan, being an "autonomous republic" rather than a "union republic" within the USSR, was not allowed by Moscow to have its own film studio (whereas each "union republic" was entitled to one). As a result, most Tatar actors, producers and directors could develop their talents only within the realm of theater. All artistic talent in those fields of self-expression was concentrated exclusively in theater rather than both theater and film. This fact might explain the extraordinary commercial success of the Tatar theater and the remarkably high quality of its productions, as well as the enormous popularity of theater as a genre among Tatars.
