= Ghabdennasir Qursawi =

Russian Tatar imam (1776–1812)

Ğäbdennasír İbrahim ulı Qursawí (Tatar: Габденнасыр Ибраһим улы Курсави, Russian: Габденнасыр Курсави, romanized: Gabdennasyr Kursavi), sometimes spelled Kursavi or Koursavi (1776–1812) was a Tatar educator, Hanafi Maturidi theologian, and prominent Jadidist. He was a brother of Ğäbdelxaliq Qursawí. He studied at Machkara (Malmyzhsky District) village madrassah and later at the Mir-i-Arab Madrasah in Bukhara. From 1794 to 1808 he was imam of the mosque in Yughary Qursa village of Kazan Governorate, Russian Empire and the headmaster of his own madrassah. His surname is, actually, a derivative of "Qursa" in Arabic manner, which means "from Qursa". He is credited with the revival of modernism- and reform-oriented Islam (or Jadidism) among the Tatars, and was the author of numerous articles about religion. He died during the hajj and is buried in Istanbul.

Other names include:

- Abunnasyr Gabdennasyr ('Abu an-Nasir) ibn Ibrahim Kursavi (Russian: Абуннасыр Габденнасыр (‘Абу ан-Насир) ибн Ибрахим Курсави)
- Abunnasyr Gabdennasyr ibn Ibrahim ibn Yarmuhammed ibn Ishtiryak al-Bulgari al-Kazani al-Kursavi (Russian: Абуннасыр Габденнасыр ибн Ибрахим ибн Ярмухаммед ибн Иштиряк аль-Булгари аль-Казани аль-Курсави)
- Äbennasıyr Ğäbdennasıyr bine İbrahim Qursawi (Tatar: Әбеннасыйр Габденнасыйр бине Ибраһим Курсави)
