= Sultanmuratovo =

Sultanmuratovo Султанмуратово
- Selo
- Location within Bashkortostan Location within Russia
- Coordinates: 54°06′N 55°44′E
- Country: Russia
- Region: Bashkortostan
- District: Aurgazinsky District
- Time zone: UTC+5:00

Sultanmuratovo (Russian: Султанмуратово; Bashkir: Солтанморат, romanized: Soltanmorat) is a rural locality (a selo) and the administrative centre of Sultanmuratovsky Selsoviet, Aurgazinsky District, Bashkortostan, Russia. The population was 706 as of 2010. There are 6 streets.

== Geography ==
Sultanmuratovo is located 17 km northwest of Tolbazy (the district's administrative centre) by road. Bakayevo is the nearest rural locality.
