= Fatix Əmirxan =

Tatar writer, editor and publicist

Fatix Əmirxan فاتح اميرخان Фатих Әмирхан
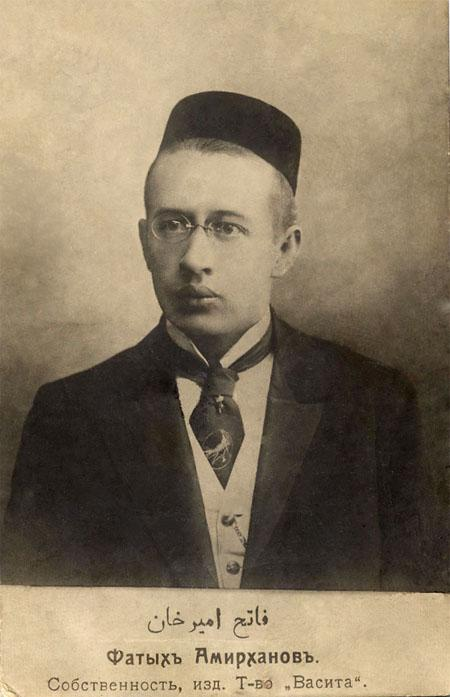
- Fatix Əmirxan
- Born: محمد فاتح محمد ظریف اوغلى اميرخان; 1 January 1886 Kazan, Russian Empire
- Died: 9 March 1926 (aged 40) Kazan, Soviet Union
- Occupation: publicist, editor

Fatix Əmirxan (Möxəmmətfatix Möxəmmətzarif uğlı Əmirxan (Note: Tatar Cyrillic: Әмирханов Мөхәммәтфатих Зариф улы; Tatar Arabic: فاتح اميرخان; pronounced [æmirˈxʌnəf mœxæˌmætfæˈtʲix zʌˌrifuˈlɯ]; Russian: Фатих Зарифович Амирхан, romanized: Fatikh Zarifovich Amirkhan or Мухамметфатых Зарифович Амирханов, Mukhammetfatykh Zarifovich Amirkhanov); 1886–1926) was a Tatar classic writer, editor and publicist.

Əmirxan was born in 1886 in Kazan, Russian Empire. His father Möxəmmətzarif was a mullah of Old Stone Mosque. He was an author of Qur'anical tafsir and the founder of the Əmirxaniyə madrasa.

Əmirxan graduated Möxəmmədiyə madrasa in Kazan, that was the most prominent Tatar educational institution at that time. In 1906-1907 he lived in Moscow and Saint Petersburg, where he published a Tatar journal for children.

Working in Kazan, Əmirxan was an editor of Əl-İslax (The Renewal). He was published in newspapers Qoyaş (The Sun), Yoldız (The star), İdel (Volga); journals Yalt-yolt (The Lightning) and Añ (The Consciousness).

Fatix Əmirxan is an author of the stories Fətxulla xəzrət (1909), Xəyət (1911); plays Yəşlər (1913), Tigezsezlər (1915); novel Urtalıqta (1912). In this writings he had reflected the problems of Tatar society in the beginning of the 20th century, tried to imagine the human behavior of the future generations. In 1926, he criticized the dogmatism and fanaticism of the Bolshevism in satiric manner. Əmirxan was a follower of realism and upheld national character in literature. Fatix Əmirxan explored the heritage of Tatar enlighteners, such as Qayum Nasıyri, wrote articles on the works of Ğəliəsğar Kamal, Ğafur Qoləxmətov. Əmirxan was one of the admirers of Tuqay's literary works and his close friend. For many years Əmirxan was paralyzed and eventually died of pulmonary tuberculosis in 1926.

== Sources ==
- "Fatix Ämirxan/Фатих Әмирхан". Tatar Encyclopaedia (in Tatar). Kazan: The Republic of Tatarstan Academy of Sciences. Institution of the Tatar Encyclopaedia. 2002.
