= Salix Säydäş =

Tatar composer (1900–1954)

Säydäşev Salix Camaletdin ulı (pronounced [sæɪˈdæʃəf sæˈlʲix ʑʌmɑletˌdinuˈlɯ] aka Salix Säydäş, also spelled Salikh Saydash(ev) [sæˈlʲix sæɪˈdæʃ(əf)] (Tatar Cyrillic: Сәйдәш(ев) Салих Җамалетдин улы; Russian: Сайда́шев Сали́х Замалетди́нович, Saydashev Salikh Zamaletdinovich; 1900 – December 16, 1954) was a composer and conductor. People's Artist of Tatar ASSR (1951), Honoured Worker of Culture (1939).

Säydäşev gave a stimulus to development of different genres in Tatar music, such as opera, ballet, musical comedy, symphonic, choral, popular and pop music. The main part of his creative work was music for musical dramatic plays, such as The Blue Shawl (1926) and On Qandır (1932) by Kärim Tinçurin, The Employer by Taci Ğizzät (1928). In 1922-1948 (off and on) Säydäşev was a chief of musical division and conductor in Kazan-based Tatar Academic Theatre. At that time Säydäşev also arranged concerts.

The Salix Säydäşev Museum opened in Kazan in 1990. The State Grand Concert Hall of Tatarstan was named after Säydäşev by the Decree of the President of Tatarstan from December 15, 2000. Also, one of the streets in the Vakhitov district in Kazan is named after Säydäşev.

Tatar composers as Renat Enikeev, Almaz Monasypov, Rezeda Akhiyarova, Leonid Lubovsky composed several works dedicated to the founder of Soviet Tatar professional music.

== Sources ==
- Дулат-Алеев, В. (2007). Татарская музыкальная литература. Казань: Казанская государственная консерватория. pp. 311–328. ISBN 978-5-85401-082-5.
- "Salix Säydäşev/Салих Сәйдәшев". Tatar Encyclopaedia (in Tatar). Kazan: The Republic of Tatarstan Academy of Sciences. Institution of the Tatar Encyclopaedia. 2002.
