= Ğaliäsğar Kamal =

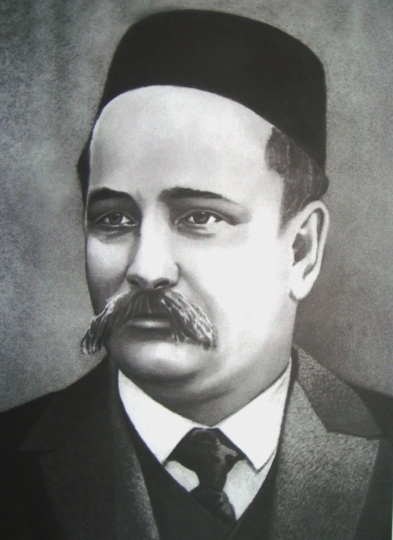
Ğaliäsğar Kamal

Ğaliäsğar Kamal (Ğaliäsğar Ğaliäkbär ulı Kamaletdinov, Tatar: Галиәсгар Галиәкбәр улы Камалетдинов, [ɣæˌliæsˈɣær kʌˈmɑl], Russian: Галиаскар Камал, Galiaskar Kamal;1879-1933) was a Tatar writer, dramatist and playwright. The leading Tatar theater in Kazan is named after him.

== Biography ==
Kamal was born on 6 January 1879 in the family of a furrier craftsman in Kazan. He studied in the Kazan madrasa Ğosmaniyä and Möxämmädiyä in 1889–1897. At the same time he studied the Russian language in a three-years municipal school.

The first play of Kamal was called The Unlucky Youth and it was published in 1900. The history of the Tatar Theater started with staging a play called The Pitiful. He actively participated in the activity of Säyyär troupe as an actor and a playwright.

== Literature ==
The creative activity of G. Kamal gained in scope after 1905, when being impressed by the events of the first Russian revolution, he wrote the plays The First Theater, The Bankrupt and others.
