= Käşşaf Tärcemani =

Muslim religious figure

- Born: 1877; İske Äncerä (Russian Empire)
- Died: 1943; Soviet Union
- Education: Märcaniä
- Employers: Central Spiritual Administration of the Muslims of Russia; White Mosque, Kazan; Möxämmädiä; Ğosmaniä; İslam mäcälläse
- Relatives: Äftaxetdin Tärcemanof

Käşşaf Tärcemani (Tatar: Кәшшаф Тәрҗемани, Käşşaf Tärcemani, كشف ترجمانى, Tatar pronunciation: [kæʃʃɑf tærʑɘmɑˈni]) or Käşşafetdin Tärcemanof (Tatar: Кәшшафетдин Тәрҗеманов, Käşşafetdin Tärcemanof, كشف الدين ترجمانف, Russian: Тарджиманов Кашафутдин Киямутдинович; 1877–1943) was a Muslim religious figure.

== Biography ==
Käşşaf Tärcemani was born in 1877 in a mullah's family. He received his primary education from his father, then he studied at Qazan's Märcaniä madrasah. In 1904 he became an imam in Qazan's White Mosque, which was located in city's Yaña Bistä area; at the same time he was a teacher in his alma mater and a mudarris in the White Mosque's madrasah. In 1906 he participated in the third All-Russian Muslim Congress; in 1917–1918 he was a member of Millät Mäclese and Milli İdärä.

In 1917 he relocated to Ufa, where he began to serve as a qadi in the Central Spiritual Administration of Muslims of Inner Russia and Siberia. At the same time he was a teacher in Ufa's Ğosmaniä madrasah (1920–1930) and a chief editor of İslam mäcälläse (Islamic Journal) journal (1924–1928). In 1926 Tärcemani attended the first World Muslim Congress as a deputy head of the Soviet delegation, the chairman being Rizaetdin Fäxretdin. After Fäxretdin's death in 1936 he was acting mufti.

In 1936 Tärcemani was arrested as a part of a falsified "Central Spiritual Administration of Muslims case" and sentenced to ten years in prison, where he died. He was rehabilitated in 1956.
