= Tatar literature =

Literary works written in Tatar language

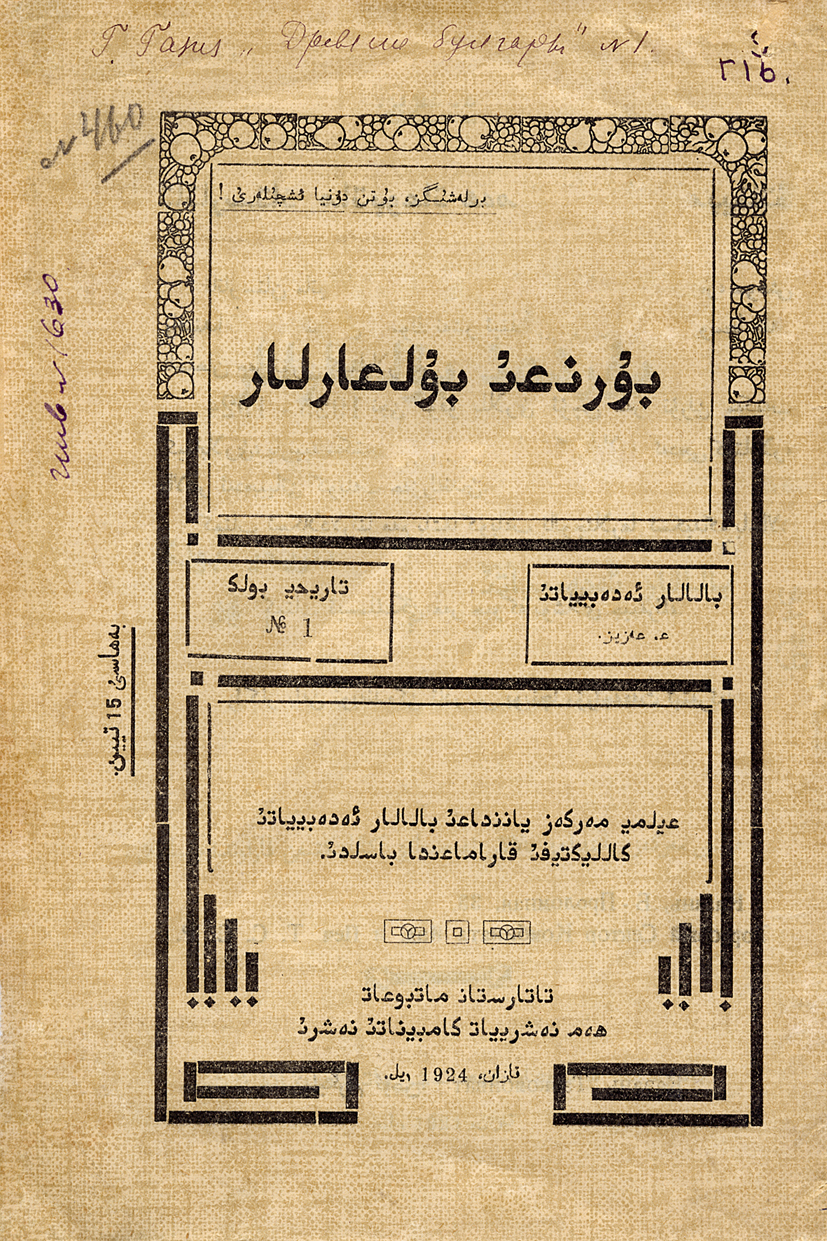
Tatar book written in the Arabic script.

Tatar literature (Tatar: татар әдәбияты) consists of literature in the Tatar language, a Turkic language spoken in the Republic of Tatarstan in Russia. Tatar literature is a part of Tatar society and has been part of Tatar history since the existence of a Tatar state. Notable Tatar poets include Ğabdulla Tuqay and Näqi İsänbät.

== History ==
Tatar literature started nearly one thousand years ago. The most famous piece of early Tatar literature is The Story of Yusuf by Qol Ghali. Grammar of the Tatar literary language was different from standard Tatar as it had more Persian, Arabic, and Old Turkic words and during the Russian invasion of Tatarstan and occupation, Tatar poets still used the Arabic script even though it was banned by the Russian authorities. Tatars also used literature for their religion, Islam. In the 18th century, Kazakh poet, Abay Kunanbayev wrote many poems in Tatar. Tatar literature started to become popular during the 20th century and throughout the Soviet era especially during the Space Race. The city of Kazan was most famous for its literature because of Musa Dzhalil, a poet who wrote works in both Tatar and Russian.

=== Modern Day ===
The government of Tatarstan established an organization for Tatar literature called the Department of Tatar Literature.
