= Säläxitdin Aðnağulof =

- Born: 1893; Sukkulovo
- Died: 16 August 1937 (aged 43–44)
- Alma mater: Ğäliä
- Employer: Qızıl Armiä; Qızıl yaw; Vatanym Tatarstan (1925–1927)

Salakhetdin Atnagulov (Note: Bashkir: Сәләхетдин Аҙнағолов, romanized: Säläxetdin Aźnağolov, Yaña imlâ: سه‌له‌حتدین ئاذناعوُلوف, Jaꞑalif: Sələxetdin Ađnaƣolov; Russian: Салахетдин Садриевич Атнагулов) (1893–1938) was a Bashkir politician, publicist and writer.

== Biography ==
Atnagulov was born in the village of Sukkulovo. He received education in rural madrasa, in rural school and in Ğäliä madrasa. After graduating from the latter worked as a teacher in his alma mater and in village of Äce (Azeyevo) in Tambov Governorate until 1917.

After the February Revolution, he began to engage in political activities. In 1917 he was elected to Millet Mejlisi, where he was a member of Tupraqçılar (or supporters of territorial autonomy) faction and participated in the activities of its territorial autonomy commission. In 1918 he was a secretary of the Collegium for the implementation of the Idel-Ural State; at the same time, he was a chairman of Bashkir Central Council. During Russian Civil War was the chief editor of Tatar-language newspapers Qızıl yaw, Qızıl Armiä (Red Army). In 1921–1922 he was the chief editor of Eşçe (Worker) newspaper.

Since 1922, he worked People's Commissariat of Education of Tatarstan ASSR, in 1927–1929 the head of Academic Center under aforementioned People's Commissariat; at the same time Aðnağulof was the chief editor of Qızıl Tatarstan (Red Tatarstan) newspaper (1922–1924). During 1920s and 1930s he collaborated with many Tatar-language newspapers and journals: Yäş eşçe (Young Worker), Tamaşaçı (Spectator), Suğışçan Allasız (Militant Atheist), İgençelär (Farmers), etc.

Atnagulov was an active supporter of the Jaꞑalif alphabet.

In the mid-1930s, Atnagulov was a lecturer in Tatar Pedagogical Institute. In 1936, Atnagulov was expelled from VKP(b) for "being in touch with Trotskyite double-dealers", and arrested the next year. He was sentenced to death on 16 August 1938, by the Military Collegium of the Supreme Court of the USSR and executed the same day. Rehabilitated in 1956.

== Family ==
Atnağulof was married to Zöhrä Atnağulova (née Mostafina), with whom he had two daughters, Çäçkä and Gölkäy and a son, Wil, a writer; to avoid further persecution, they were forced to change their last names.
