= Akhtyamov =

Akhtyamov is a surname. Notable people with this surname include:

- Artur Akhtyamov (born 2001), Russian ice hockey player
- Daniel Akhtyamov (born 1985), Uzbek-Azerbaijani footballer
- Ibniyamin Akhtyamov (1877–1941), Russian lawyer and politician
