= Idel-Ural State =

1918 Tatar republic in Kazan and Ufa, Russia

Coordinates: 55°47′47″N 49°06′32″E

Idel-Ural State ادیل-اورال Идел-Урал
- 1917–1918
- Flag

- Claimed borders of Idel-Ural
- Status: Unrecognized state
- Capital: Ufa
- Common languages: Tatar, Russian
- Government: Republic
- President
  - 1918: Sadrí Maqsudí Arsal
- Historical era: Russian Civil War
  - Proclamation: 29 November 1917
  - Defeat by the Red Army: 28 March 1918
Preceded by
| Russian Republic |
| Kazan Soviet Workers' and Peasants' Republic |
Succeeded by
| Russian SFSR |
| Tatar ASSR |
| Bashkir ASSR |
| Chuvash ASSR |

The Idel-Ural State (Note: (Tatar: Идел-Урал өлкәсе, İdel-Ural ölkäse, ادیل-اورال اولكسی, also İdel-Ural berlege İdel-Ural ştatı), also known as the Volga-Ural State or the Idel-Ural Republic.) was a short-lasting autonomy of Tatar peoples that claimed to unite the Tatars, Bashkirs, and Chuvash in the turmoil of the Russian Civil War. The republic was proclaimed on 1 March 1918, by a Congress of Muslims from Russia's interior and Siberia, but defeated by Bolsheviks the same month. Idel-Ural means "Volga-Ural" in the Tatar language.

== History ==
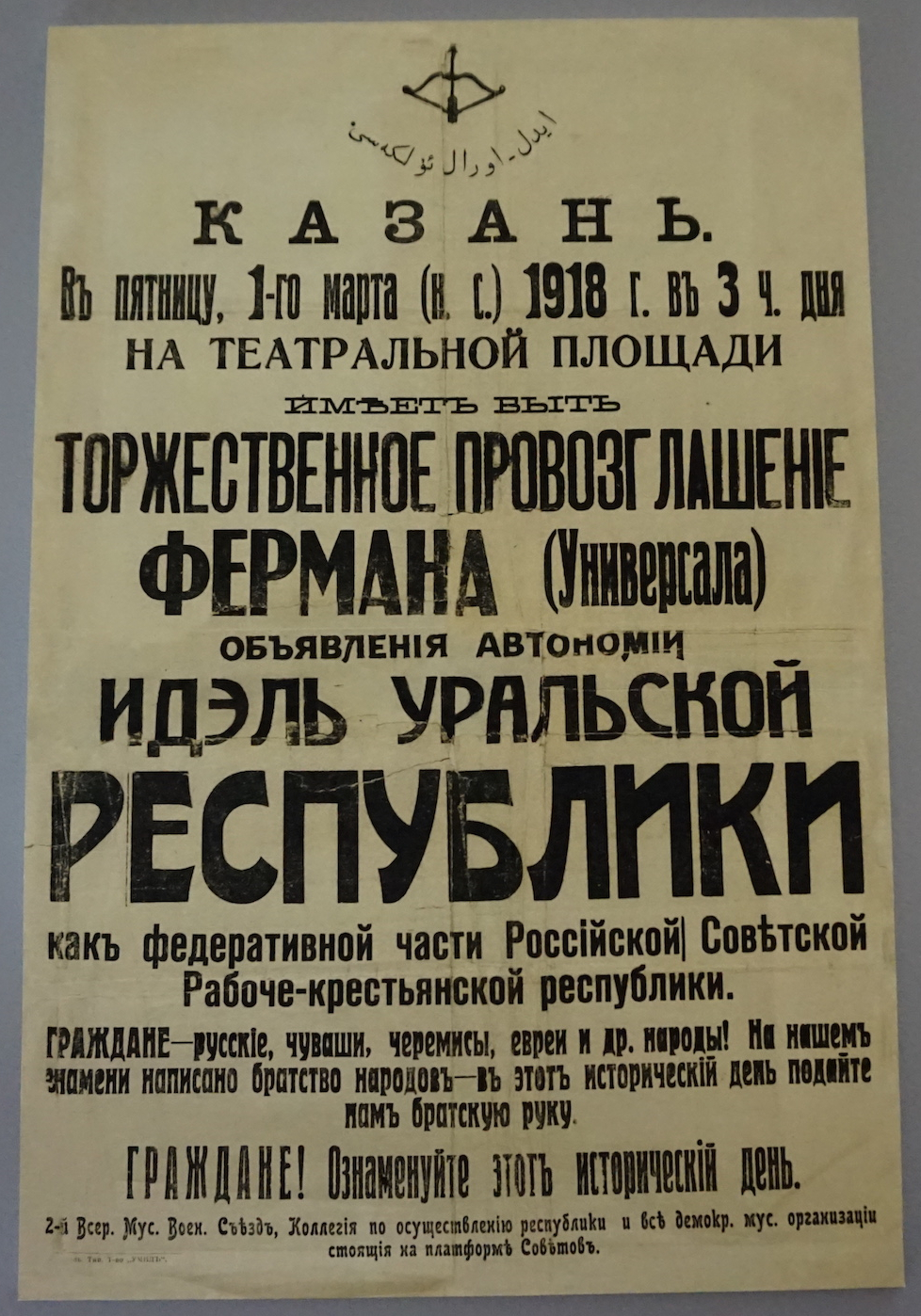
Proclamation of Idel-Ural Republic

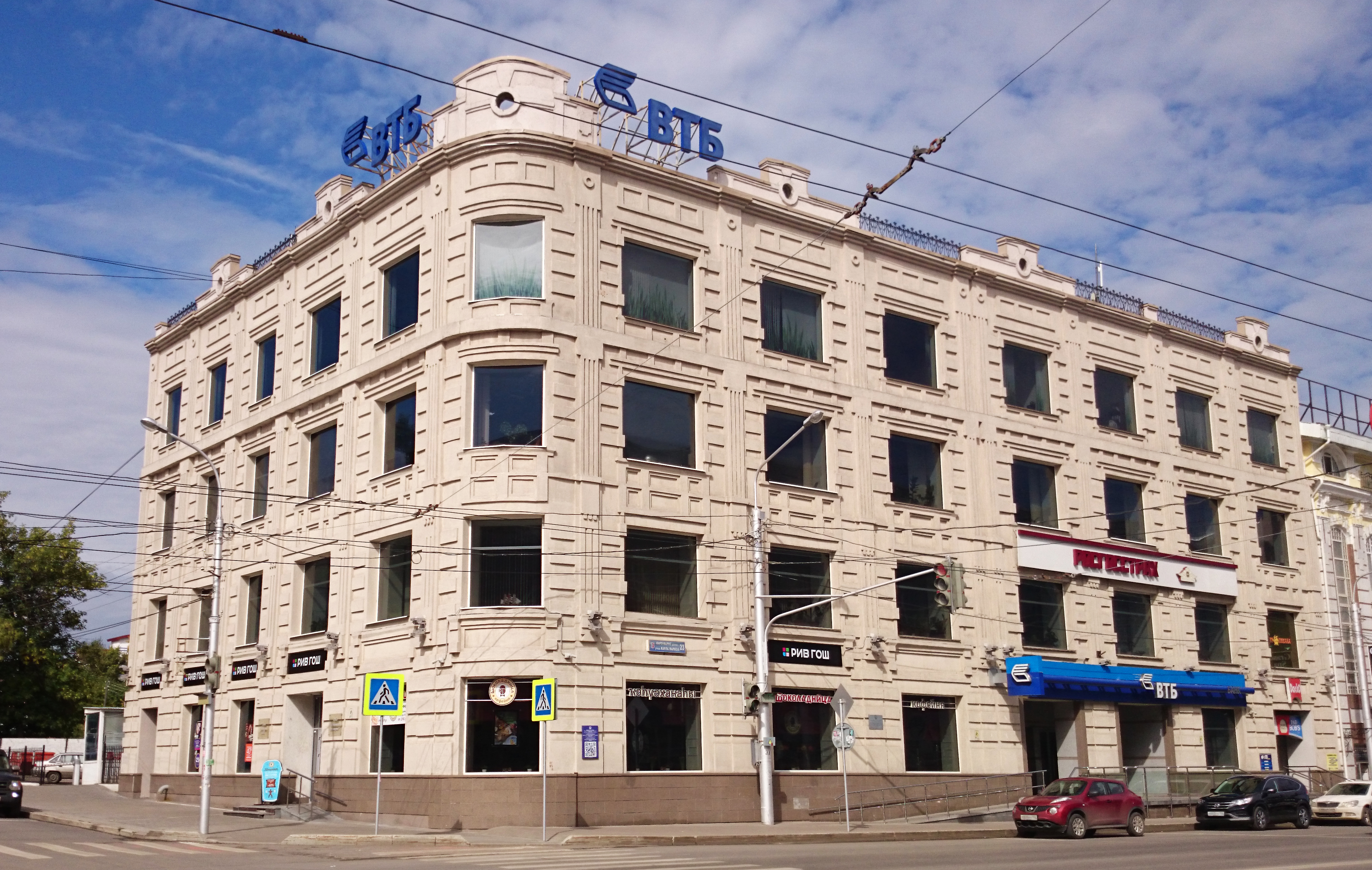
Şämğulof's House in Ufa, where the sessions of the National Parliament (Millät Mäclese) took place.

During the Russian Revolution, various regional political leaders convened in June 1917 in Kazan. The group declared the autonomy of "Muslim Turk-Tatars of Inner Russia and Siberia". Later on, in Ufa, a parliament named the Millät Mäclese (National Council) was created, in which a draft for the creation of the state would be pushed through and accepted on 29 November 1917 following the Second All-Russia Muslim Congress. However, the Idel-Ural State was met with opposition from Zeki Velidi Togan, a Bashkir revolutionary, who declared the autonomy of Bashkiria, as well as from the Bolsheviks, who had initially supported the creation of Idel-Ural but two months after denounced it as bourgeois nationalism and declared the creation of the Tatar-Bashkir Soviet Republic, with around the same borders as Idel-Ural. This struggle between three different movements weakened the Idel-Ural State.

Members of the Tatar-Bashkir Committee of Idel-Ural based outside of Russia such as Ayaz İshaki participated in an anti-Bolshevik propaganda war. Some also joined the Prometey group, a circle of anti-Soviet Muslim intellectuals based in Warsaw. The idea of Idel-Ural by its supporting nationalists included the territory of modern-day Tatarstan, Bashkortostan, and most of Orenburg Oblast. The nationalists also wished for expansion towards the Caspian Sea. In January 1918, the Millät Mäclese adopted a constitution written by Galimzian Sharaf, Ilias and Jangir Alkin, Osman Tokumbetov, and Y. Muzaffarov.

The Millät Mäclese looked to declare the creation of Idel-Ural on 1 March 1918, a plan which never came to fruition due to Bolshevik arrests of deputies of the Millät Mäclese and their official declaration of the Tatar-Bashkir Soviet Socialist Republic. After the arrested deputies were freed, they reconvened in the Tatar part of Kazan beyond the Bolaq stream (hence in Soviet historiography it was called "Transbolaq Republic" (Забулачная республика)). The republic, which in reality included only some sections of Kazan and Ufa, was defeated by the Red Army on 28 March 1918. Its Parliament disbanded in April.

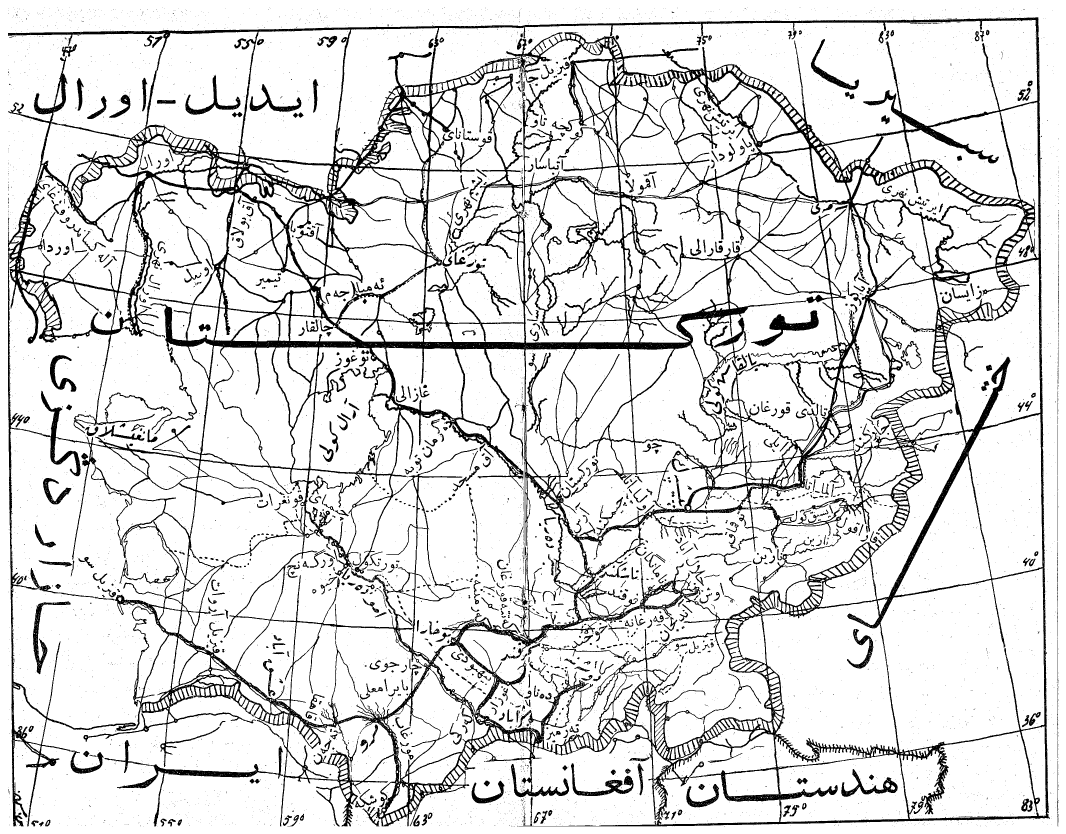
Chaghatay-language map depicting Idel-Ural (ایدیل-اورال) neighboring Turkestan (تورکستان), from the November 1931 issue of the Berlin-based Yash Turkistan magazine

The president of Idel-Ural, Sadrí Maqsudí Arsal, escaped to Finland in 1918. He was well received by the Finnish foreign minister Carl Enckell, who remembered his valiant defence of the national self-determination and constitutional rights of Finland in the Russian Duma. The president-in-exile also met officials from Estonia before continuing in 1919 to Sweden, Germany, and France, in a quest for Western support. Idel-Ural was listed among the "Captive Nations" in the Cold War-era public law (1959) of the United States.

== See also ==
- Free Idel-Ural
- Idel-Ural
- Collegium for the implementation of the Idel-Ural State
- Zeki Validi Togan
