= İske Äncerä =

İske Äncerä Иске Әнҗерә
- selo
- Location within Tatarstan
- Country: Russia
- Region: Tatarstan
- District: Älki District
- Time zone: UTC+3:00

İske Äncerä (Tatar: Иске Әнҗерә, romanized: İske Äncerä) is a rural locality (a selo) in Älki District, Tatarstan. The population was 238 as of 2010. İske Äncerä is located 24 km from Вazarlı Matаq, district's administrative centre, and 169 km from Qazаn, republic's capital, by road. The earliest known record of the settlement dates from 1716/1717. There are 7 streets in the village.
