= Starye Chelny =

Starye Chelny may refer to:

- Starye Chelny, Alkeyevsky District, Republic of Tatarstan, a village (selo) in Alkeyevsky District of the Republic of Tatarstan, Russia
- Starye Chelny, Nurlatsky District, Republic of Tatarstan, a village (selo) in Nurlatsky District of the Republic of Tatarstan, Russia
