= Ğälimcan Şäräf =

Tatar linguist and politician

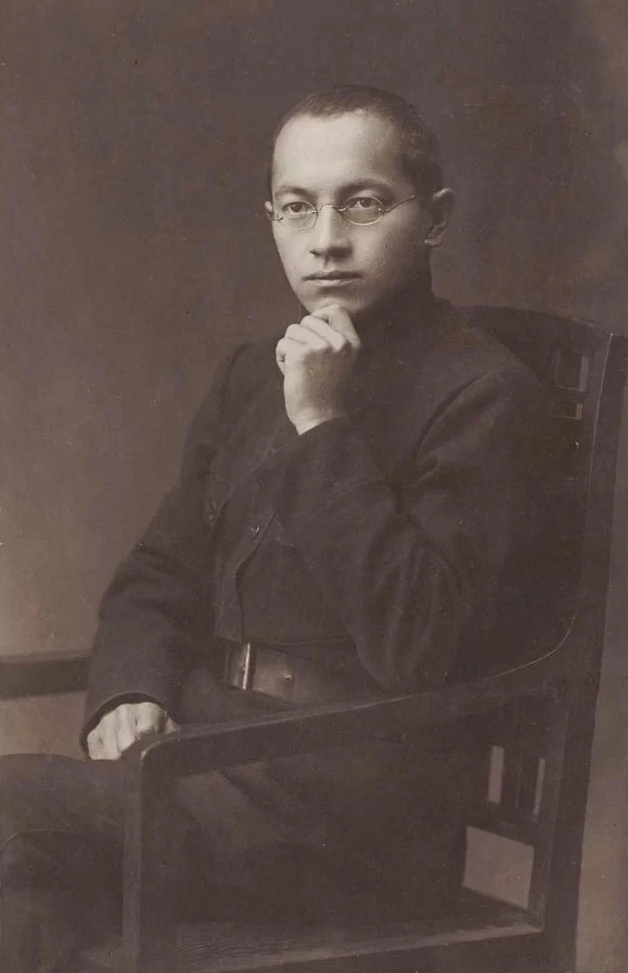
Sharaf 1925.

Ğälimcan Şäräf (Tatar: Галимҗан Шәрәфетдин, Ğälimcan Şäräfetdin, عليم جان شرف الدين, Tatar pronunciation: [ᴚælimˈʑɑn ʃæˈræf]; 1896 – 1950) was a Tatar public figure, linguist and politician of the Soviet Union.

== Biography ==
Ğälimcan Şäräf was born in 1896 in the village of Aqsu (Kazan Governorate) to a family of a wealthy peasant Şäräfetdin, and his wife, Ğäynelnäwal. He received his primary education from his father, then he studied at Möxämmädiyä and 2nd Qazan Realschule. In 1915 Şäräf moves to Petrograd, where he studies at Institute of Railway Engineers and Petrograd State University's history faculty simultaneously.

After the February Revolution Ğälimcan Şäräf began to engage in political activities. He participated in 1st and 2nd All-Russian Muslim Congresses, Millät Mäclese and headed the Collegium for the implementation of the Idel-Ural State. Ğälimcan Şäräf participated in the creation of projects for the Idel-Ural State (together with İlyas Alkin), the Tatar-Bashkir SSR (of which he was an active supporter) and the Tatar ASSR; he was member of the mixed commission for the establishment of borders of the TASSR.

In 1919-1920 Şäräf studied at Qazan State University's faculty of history and philology and began research in the field of experimental phonetics under the direction of professor Vasily Bogoroditsky. In 1920-1921 he was a head of the Department of Oriental Studies of the Academic Center (tt). Between 1922 and 1937 he worked in Oriental Pedagogical Institute (later Tatar Pedagogical Institute).

Being an opponent of the Jaꞑalif alphabet, Şäräf was one of the signatories of the so-called "letter of the 82s". Also, at the First All-Union Turkological Congress he voted against immediate implementation of aforementioned alphabet for USSR's Turkic languages. Since 1929 Şäräf was an active member of the International Association for Experimental Phonetics.

In 1937 Şäräf was arrested as a part of a falsified case of the Anti-Soviet bourgeois nationalist organisation, charged of being "one of the leaders of the nationalist organisation" and of "carrying out intelligence activities" and sentenced to eight years of labour camps; released in 1945 due to serious illness. After returning from imprisonment Şäräf worked as a school teacher in one of the villages of Apas District (Tatar ASSR).

Ğälimcan Şäräf died on January 13, 1950. Rehabilitated in 1958.
