= Aktay =

Aqtay, Aktay
- Location of mouth

Location
- Countries: Tatarstan, Russia

Physical characteristics
- Source
  - location: Verkhnie Mataki, Alkeyevsky District
- Mouth: Volga
  - location: Izmeri, Spassky District
  - coordinates: 55.1209°N 49.5509°E
  - elevation: 53 m (174 ft)
- Length: 89 km (55 mi)
- Basin size: 1,016 km^{2} (392 mi^{2})
- Discharge
  - average: 422 m^{3}/s (14,900 cu ft/s)

Basin features
- Progression: Volga→ Caspian Sea

The Aktay (Russian: Актай) or Aqtay (Tatar: Актай, romanized: Aqtay) is a river in Tatarstan, Russian Federation, a left-bank tributary of the Volga, falling into the Kuybyshev Reservoir near Izmeri. It is 89 kilometres (55 mi) long, and its drainage basin covers 1,016 square kilometres (392 mi^{2}).

The major tributaries are Chelninka, Salmanka, and Romodanka. The maximal mineralization is 500 to 700 mg/L. The average sediment deposition at the river mouth each year is 71 millimetres (2.8 in). Drainage is regulated. In the upper stream use to dry. Bazarnye Mataki is along the river.
