= Millet Mejlisi =

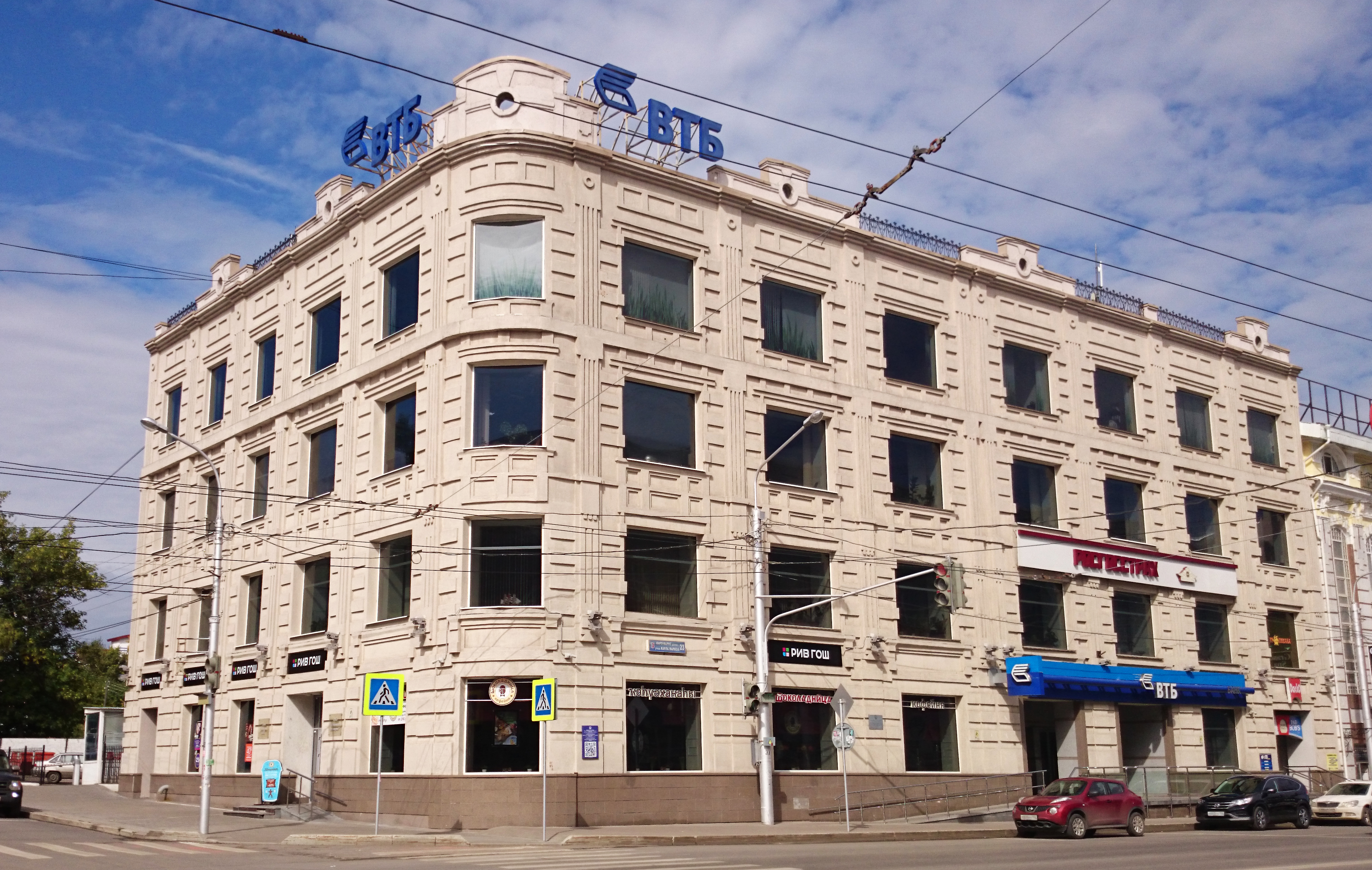
Şämğulov's House in Ufa, where the sessions of Millät Mäclese took place.

The Millät Mäjlese (Note: Bashkir: Милләт Мәжлесе, pronounced [mɪlˈlæt mæʒlɘˈsɘ]; Tatar: Милләт Мәҗлесе, Millät Mäclese, pronounced [milˈlæt mæʑlɘˈsɘ]) (National Assembly) was a national assembly of Muslim Turko-Tatars of Inner Russia and Siberia that was created by the decision of Second All-Russian Muslim Congress and worked in Ufa from 20 November 1917 to 11 January 1918.

Sadri Mäqsudi was elected as the National Assembly's Chairman; İbniämin Äxtämov and Ğabdraxman Fäxretdinov were elected as Deputy Chairman and Secretary, respectively.

Millät Mäclese did not recognize Soviet authority and decided to establish the Idel-Ural State. In order to achieve this goal, the Commission for Implementation of the Idel-Ural State was established in January 1918. In the same month, the executive board of the future autonomy, Milli İdärä (National Board), was established. There were several commissions that worked under the Parliament: legislative assumptions commission, mandate commission, education commission, financial commission, religious commission, territorial autonomy commission, "national regions" commission.

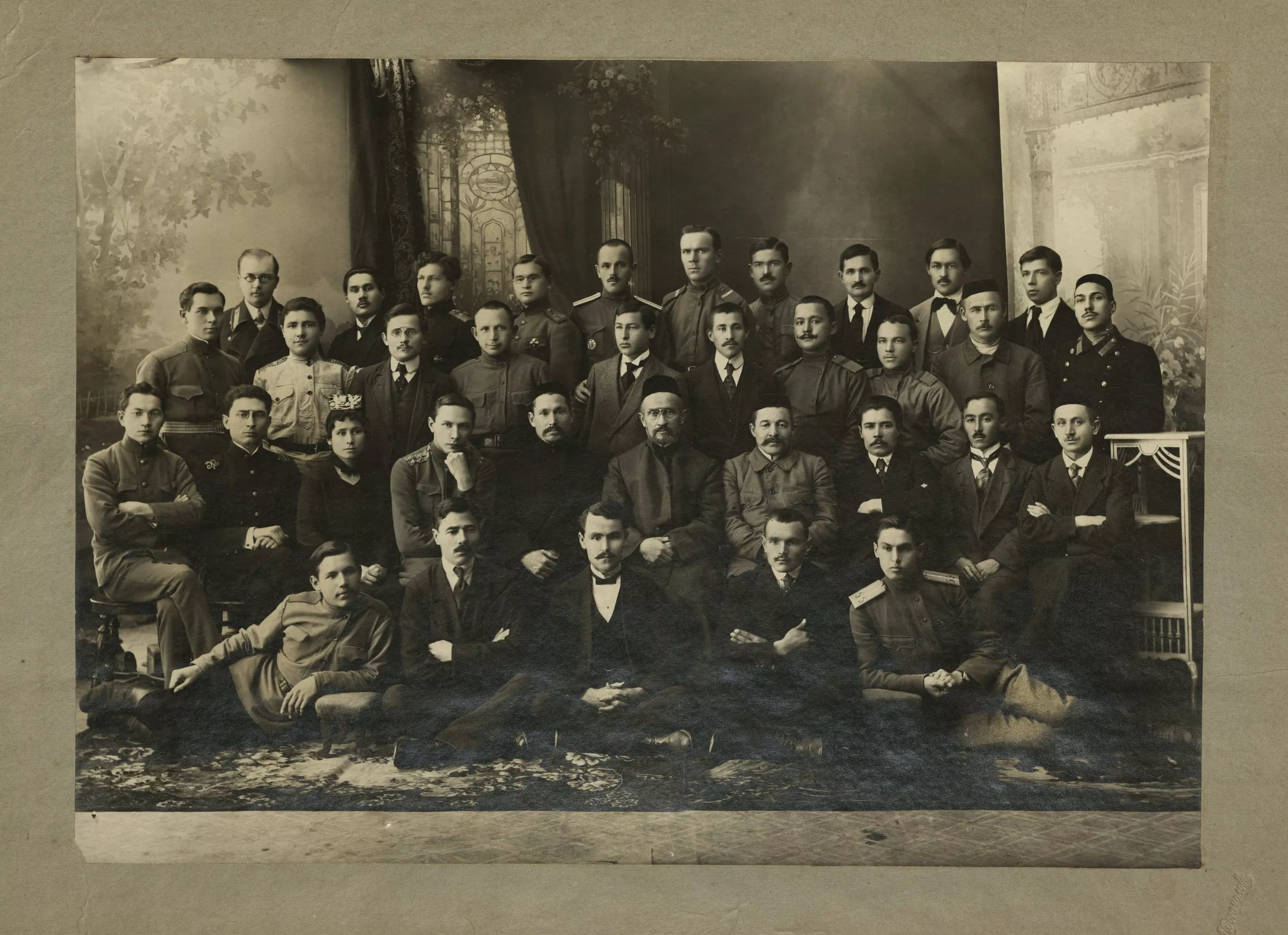
Representatives of the Tuprakchylar faction (territorialists) in the Millet Mejlisi

It consisted of about 110 members which were divided into 2 factions: "Türkiysilər", supporters of national-cultural autonomy (Sadri Mäqsudi, Äxmäthadi Mäqsudi, Ğayaz İsxaqi, Zakir Qadıyri, Ğömär Tereğolof and others), and "Tupraqçılar", supporters of territorial autonomy (İlyas Alkin, Hadi Atlasi, Ğabdulla Sönasi, Ğalimcan İbrahimof, Sələxetdin Aðnagulof, Ğäbdelbari Battal, Sälimgerey Jantörin, Ğalimcan Şäräf and others).

== Members ==
- Zıyaetdin Kâmali (Ufa)
- Ğalimcan İbrahimof (Ufa)
- Ğömär Tereğolof (Ufa)
- İbneämin Äxtämef (Ufa)
- Miñleislam Ğosmanof (Ufa)
- Ğazıym Qasiymof (Ufa)
- İsmağil İslamğolof (Ufa)
- Şäyxulla Alkin (Ufa)
- Ğäbdelxäy Däwkäyef (Ufa)
- Ğäyazetdin Yaqupof (Ufa)
- Cämaletdin Xörämşin (Ufa)
- Salixcan Urmanof (Ufa)
- Zakir Qadıyri (Ufa)
- Möbäräkşa Xänäfi (Ufa)
- Möxetdin Äxmäref (Ufa)
- Äxmädetdin Möxämmätdinef (Ufa)
- Abruy Säyfi (Ufa)
- Ğömär Älmöxämmätef (Ufa)
- Sälimgäräy Cantürin (Ufa)
- Fatix Säyfi (Ufa)
- Musa Ismaqof (Ufa)
- Säläxetdin Atnağulof (Ufa)
- Fätxi Äxmädullin (Ufa)
- Mänsur Xaliqof (Ufa)
- Sähman İsxaqof (Ufa)
- Ğilemdar Bayembätef (Ufa)
- İlyas Alkin (Qazan)
- İsmäğil Ğabdi (Qazan)
- Sädri Mäqsudi (Qazan)
- Ğäbdelbari Battal (Qazan)
- Şähit Äxmädief (Qazan)
- Xäliulla Safiullin (Qazan)
- Säyet Waxitof (Qazan)
- Xänäfi Mozaffarof (Qazan)
- Ğataulla Bahawetdinef (Qazan)
- Wäli Ğällämef (Orenburg (Urınburğ))
- Ğäbdelğäziz Mortazin (Orenburg)
- Ğömär Ğäbdelbaqıyef (Orenburg)
- Ğarif Kitayef (Orenburg)
- Bican Ğäbbasof (Orenburg)
- İsxaq Ğädelgäräyef (Orenburg)
- Näcip Qorbanğälief (Orenburg)
- Hadi Atlasof (Samara (Samar))
- Xösnulla Bahawetdinef (Samara)
- Zakir Ayuxanof (Samar)
- Ğabdraxman Äxmäref (Ästerxan (Astrakhan))
- Şähit Ğäyfi (Ästerxan)
- Sadıyq Ğabdulof (Perm (Pirem))
- Ğirfan Raxmanqolof (Perm)
- Qasıym Xäzrätef (Perm)
- İbrahim Bikqolof (Simbrisk (Sember))
- Ğäbdessamat Şähidullin (Simbirsk)
- Xälil Bäkief (Simbrisk)
- Säğit Yanqılıçef (Saratov (Sarıtaw))
- Sadıyq Räximqolof (Saratov)
- Xäsän Tahirof (Tambov (Tambu))
- Äxmätfärit Şirvanof (Uralsk (Cayıq))
- Ğalim Aqçurin (Akmolinsk (Aqmola))
- Hadi Zöfäref (5th Army)
- İsmäğil Qäderlief (12th Army)
- Zıya Mälikef (12th Army)
- Ğabdulla Ämiref (Romanian Front)
- Xösäyen Bornaşef (Romanian Front)
- Ğayaz İsxaqi (Moscow (Mäskäw))
- Xösäyen Baybäkef (Kasimov (Xankirmän))
- Ğabdraxman Fäxretdinef (Romanian Front)
- Ğosman Diwäyef (Kharkov (Xarkaw))
- Ğabraxman Raxmanqolof (1st Army)
- Ğäni Abızof (Rostov-on-Don)
- Ğäynulla Raxmanqolof (Caucasian Front)
- Fatix Möxämmätyarof (Southwestern Front)
- X. Yähüdin (Southwestern Front)
- Ğ. Fäyzraxmanof (Southwestern Front)
- Ğöbäydulla Bubıy (Vyatka (Wätke))
- Ğirfan Baltanof (Vyatka)
- Xälimbäk Yärmief (2nd Army)
- Cämil Ğälief (10th Army)
- Dawıt Yanalief (Penza (Pinzä))
- Ğabdulla Däweşef (Northern Russia)
- Xäbibulla Zäynetdinef (3rd Army)
- Ğäbdelcälil Ğabdraxmanof (Southwestern Front)
- Ğabdulla Söläymani (Nizhny Novgorod (Nijgar));

Another twenty people were elected but did not participate in the meetings, among them Mullanur Waxitof, Möxetdin Qorbanğälief, Rizaetdin Faxretdin, Xädiçä Yamaşeva (Tanaçeva).

== Place of sessions ==
Millät Mäclese's sessions were held at a house that belonged to Sämiğulla Şämğulof, a merchant, at the corner of Aleksandrovskaya (Aliksandırski) and Malaya Kazanskaya streets. Also, there were plans to move Millät Mäclese to Qazan, namely to Ğabdulla Säğdief's house at Yekaterininskaya (Yıkatirinski) Street.
