= Kärim Tinçurin =

Tatar playwright

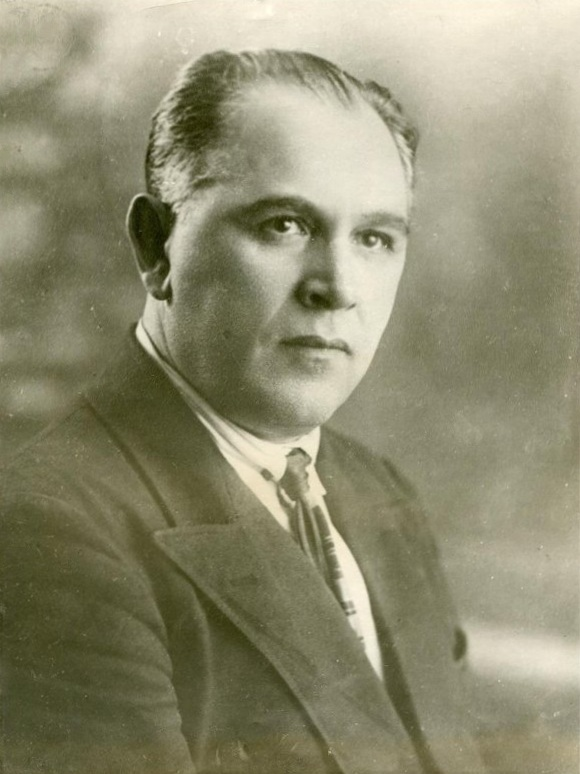
Kärim Tinçurin

Tinçurin Kärim Ğäli ulı (Cyrillic: Тинчурин Кәрим Гали улы), a.k.a. Kärim Tinçurin ([kæˈrim tinˈɕurin]; Cyrillic: Кәрим Тинчурин, Janalif: Kərim Tincurin; Russian: Тинчурин Карим Галиевич, Tinchurin Karim Galievich; 15 September 1887 – 15 November 1938) was a Tatar playwright and actor.

Tinçurin was born to a peasant family, in the village of Tarakanovo (now Akkul in Penza Oblast). After getting work as a dishwasher in his teens, he studied at the famous Tatar madrasah, Möxämmädiä. However feeling dissatisfied with the education process there, he left with 82 other pupils in February, 1906. After visiting several Russian provinces, working as an itinerant teacher in rural schools, in 1910 joined his first professional troupe Säyyär, becoming not just an actor, but also a playwright and one of the leading directors. In 1912 he wrote the play Honest Labour and in 1913 he wrote Fatal Step. Karim was an innovative playwright, studying the complex and contradictory phenomenon of forming personality, and so dealing with the construction of the dramatic conflict in a novel way.

In 1918 Tinçurin was based in Moscow and was appointed chief of the Cultural Department of the Central Muslim Military Collegium, the military wing of Muskom. However, by November 1922, he had founded the Tatar Academic Theatre in Kazan. Here he worked with a number of prominent actors: B.Tarkhanov, K.Shamil, G.Bolgarskaya and others.

Tinçurin wrote more than 30 plays during his short creative life:

- Kazan Guys
- Motherland
- Blue Shawl
- Honest Labour (1912)
- Fatal Step (1913)
- Yusuf and Zuleyha (1918)
- The Parrot (1918)
- The American (1925)
- Without Sails (1926)
- On the Kandra River (1932)
- There Were Three of Them (1932)

A victim of political repression during Stalinism, Tinçurin was rehabilitated posthumously.
