= Kargopol (inhabited locality) =

Kargopol (Russian: Каргополь) is the name of several inhabited localities in Russia.

Urban localities

- Kargopol, a town in Kargopolsky District of Arkhangelsk Oblast

Rural localities

- Kargopol, Republic of Tatarstan, a selo in Alkeyevsky District of the Republic of Tatarstan
