= Ğäliä =

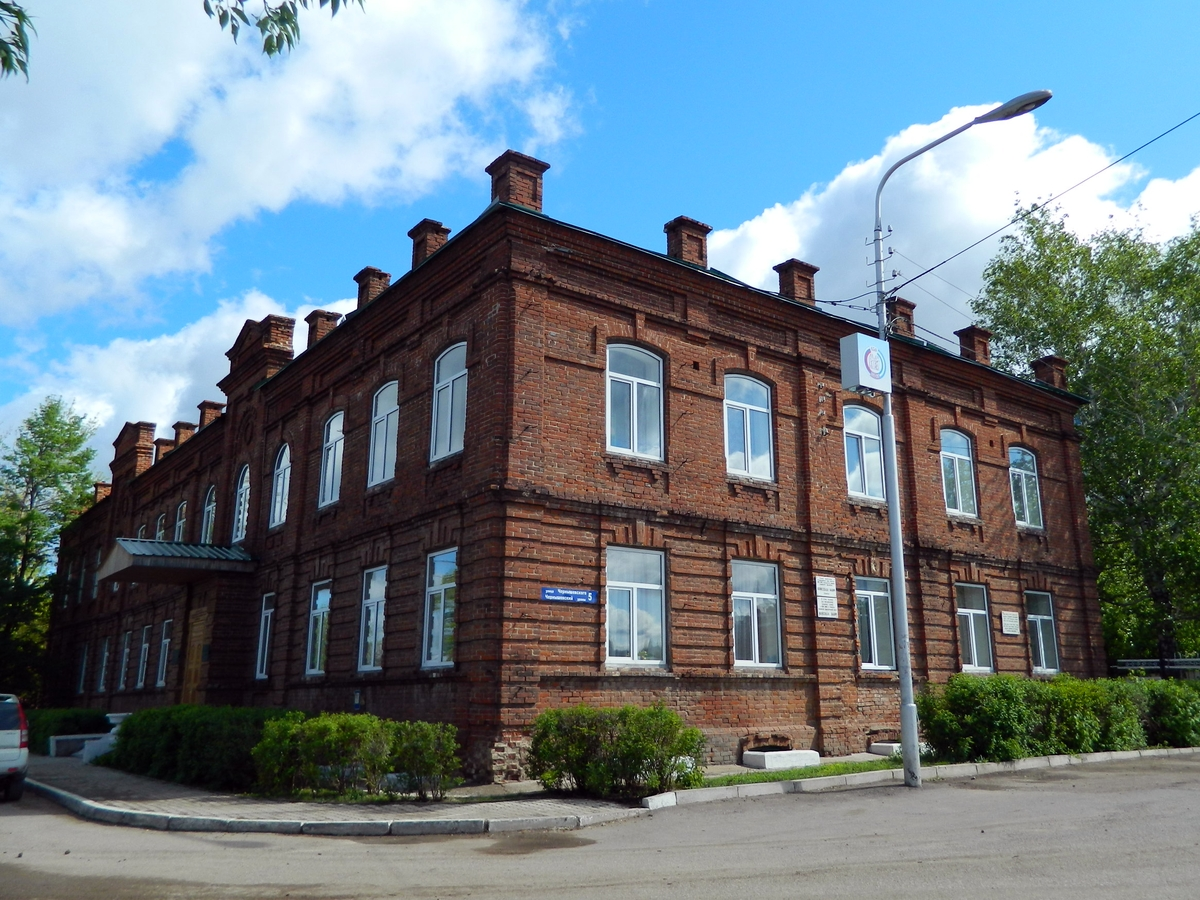
The building of the former madrasa

Ğəliyə (Bashkir: Ғәлиә, علیه, romanized: Ğəliyə) was a madrasa that was attached existed to Ufa's second cathedral mosque and existed between 1906 and 1919. Its founder and director was Zıya Kamali.

Since 1907, Ğəliyə was located in a three-story building, specially built at the expense of Ufa landowner Sofıyabekə Cantürina and merchant Səxdiy Nazirof; madrasa also received large financial assistance from Sälimgerey Jantörin.

Apart from religious disciplines, there were taught Arabic, Old Bashkir and Russian languages, philosophy, rhetoric, geography, history, arithmetic, chemistry, physics, physiology, etc. ― about 30 subjects in total.

Ğəliyə was an alma mater for many Bashkir, Tatar, Kazakh and Uzbek writers, public figures and statesmen such as Galimcan İbrahimof, Şəyixzada Babiç, Məjit Ğafuriy, Ğibadulla Alparof, Soltan Ğäbäşi, Xäsän Tufan, Şärif Sünçäläy, Kärim Xäkimef, Maǵjan Jumabaı, Beıіmbet Maılın, Mirmuhsin Shermuhamedov.

Zakir Qadıyri, Zəkiy Wəlidiy, Xuca Bädiği, Xäbibulla Zäyni, Ğiniätulla Tereğulov, Ğabdulla Sönasi, Ğalimcan İbrahimof, Sələx Aðnağulov and others worked here as teachers in different years.
