= Kazan Soviet Workers' and Peasants' Republic =

Soviet republic in Kazan in 1918

Kazan Soviet Workers' and Peasants' Republic Казанская советская рабоче-крестьянская республика (Russian)
- 1918
- Flag

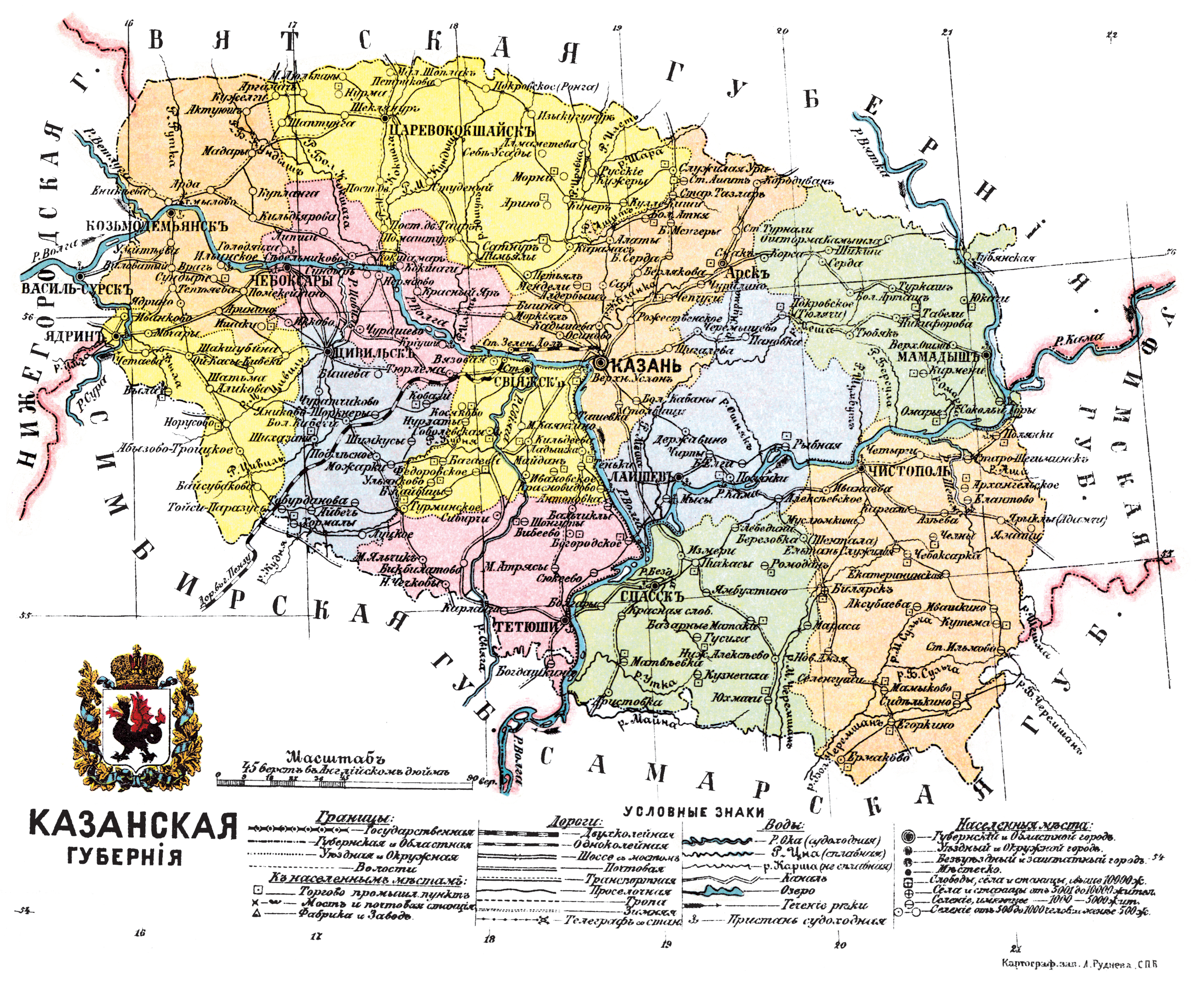
- Map of the Kazan Governorate in 1913
- Status: Unrecognized state
- Capital: Kazan
- Government: Soviet republic
- Chairman of the Council of People's Commissars
  - 1918: Yakov Sheinkman
- Historical era: Russian Civil War
  - Established: February 1918
  - Disestablished: 16 May 1918
Preceded by	Succeeded by
Kazan Governorate	Idel-Ural State
- Today part of: Russia

The Kazan Soviet Workers' and Peasants' Republic (Russian: Казанская советская рабоче-крестьянская республика) was an unrecognised revolutionary state, formed during the Russian Civil War, within the Kazan Governorate, Russia.

== History ==
It was created by agreement of the parties that were part of the Kazan Soviet at the end of February 1918. It was liquidated on May 16, 1918 by decision of the executive committee of the Kazan Provincial Soviet. It was formed in opposition to the formation of the Idel-Ural State.

== Government ==
- Chairman of the Council of People's Commissars - Yakov S. Sheinkman.
- People's Commissar of Internal Affairs - V. I. Mokhov.
- People's Commissar of Agriculture - K. M. Shnurovsky.
- People's Commissar of Food - Yakov S. Sheinkman.
- People's Commissar of Railways - I. O. Anosov.
- People's Commissar of Trade and Industry - A. I. Karpov.
- People's Commissar of Finance - V.N. Skachkov.
- People's Commissar of Labor - S. M. Braude.
- People's Commissar for Nationalities - Sahib-Garey Said-Galiev.

== See also ==
- Aftermath of World War I
- Rat (council)
