= Märcaniä =

Madrasa in Kazan, Russia

Coordinates: 55°46′49″N 49°07′01″E

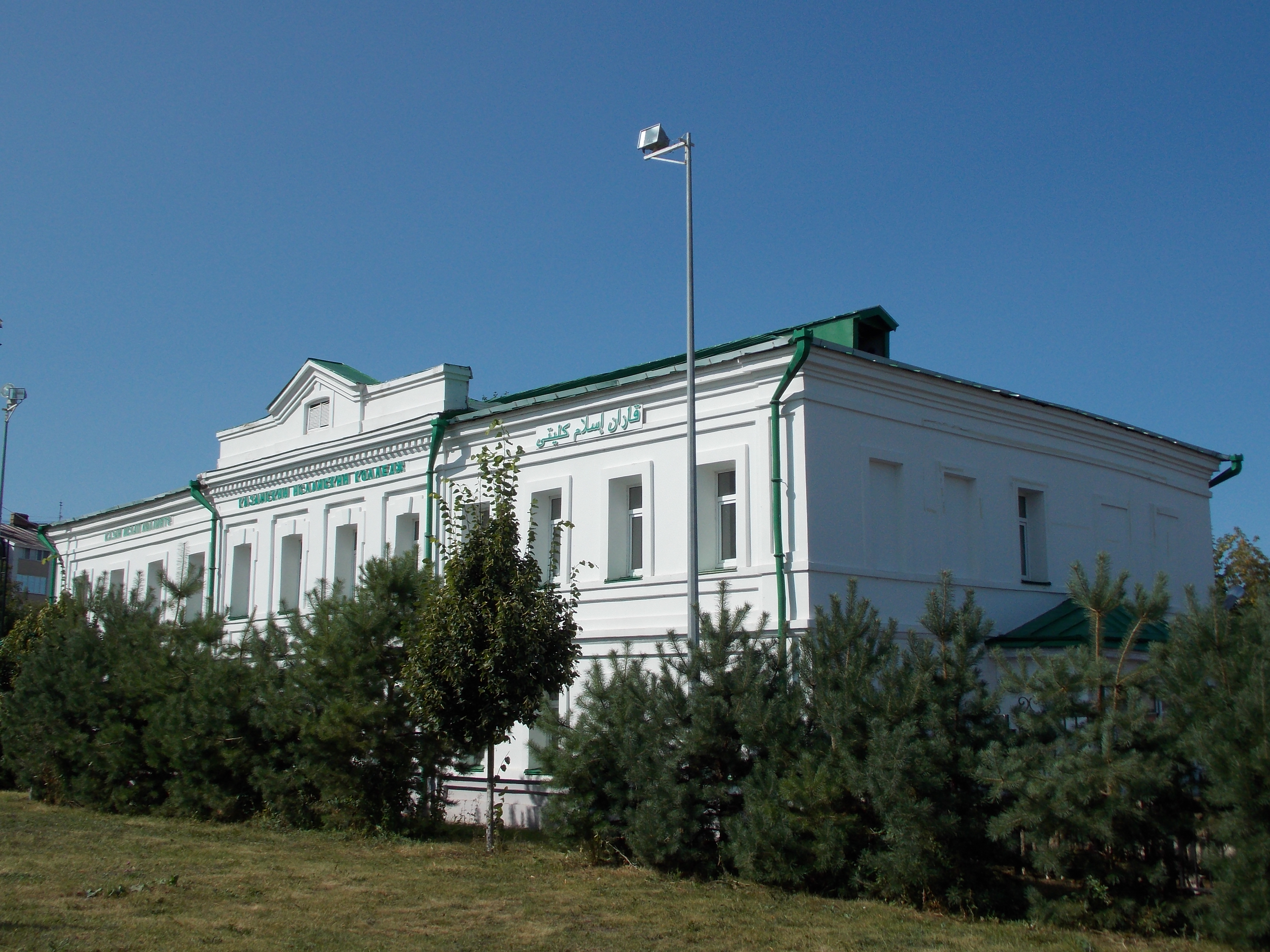
The building of the former madrasa

Märcaniä (Tatar: Мәрҗания, Märcaniä, مرجانیة) was a madrasa in Kazan attached to the Märcani Mosque.

== Brief history ==
It was created around 1770 and had many (often coexisting) names, including The First Cathedral Mosque's madrasa and Yunısof's madrasa. Later, it acquired the name Märcaniä, in honour of Şihabetdin Märcani, who was madrasa's mudarris between 1850 and 1889, during whose leadership the madrasa became a major center of Muslim education in the area; apart from religious subjects, mathematics, astronomy and history and other non-religious subjects were taught.

In 1918, the madrasah was officially closed, but Märcani Mosque's imam Safiulla Abdullin continued to secretly teach shakirds until 1923.

== Famous students ==
Märcaniä was an alma mater for Xösäyen Yamaşef, Salix Säydäş, Xösäyen Fäyezxanof, Ğäbdelğälläm Fäyezxanof, Ğabdraxman Ğömäri, Sitdıyq Aydarof, Käşşaf Tärcemani, Ğabdulla Apanayef, Morat Rämzi and others.
