= Xädiçä Yamaşeva =

Tatar dentist and revolutionary

- Born: 1881; Chistopol (Russian Empire)
- Died: 29 September 1950 (aged 68–69); Estärletamaq (Soviet Union)
- Resting place: Estärletamaq
- Spouse(s): Xösäyen Yamaşev, Walitxan Tanas

Xädiçä Yamaşeva (Yamaşıva, née Bädämşina, Tatar: Хәдичә Ямашева, Xädiçä Yamaşeva, خديجة ياماشيۋا, Yaña imlâ خەدىچە ياماشىٰۋا), Tatar pronunciation: [χædiˈɕæ jɑˈmaʃɯwa]) was a dentist and a member of a revolutionary movement.

== Biography ==
Xädiçä Yamaşeva was born in 1881 in Çistay (Chistopol); her father, Zarif Bädämşin was a merchant. Yamaşeva graduated from Kotova's private gymnasium in 1910 and, after that, from medical school in Qazan.

In 1907 she was an official chief editor of the first Tatar Marxist newspaper "Ural", the actual chief editor being Xösäyen Yamaşef, her husband. During 1917, she was a member of the Board of Qazan Muslim Women Society and Вeputy Chairman of the Presidium of the All-Russian Congress of Muslim Women; she was also elected to Millät Mäclese, but did not participate in its activities. After 1918, she worked as a dentist in Qazan, Moscow and USSR's Central Asian republics.

In 1937 Yamaşeva was arrested for the first time and accused of being a "member of the nationalist pan-Turkist organization" and of "having connections with (White) emigrants" and sentenced to eight years of labour camps (Ukhtizhemlag); released in 1945. In 1949 Yamaşeva was arrested again and sentenced to exile in Krasnoyarsk Krai, namely to the village of Estärletamaq (Sterliamak), which happened to be an ethnic Tatar village, where she died. She was rehabilitated in 1957.

== Relatives ==
Her first husband was Xösäyen Yamaşef, who was a Tatar social democrat revolutionary and publicist. After his death, she married Validkhan Tanachev, who was a member of Russian Constituent Assembly and a member of Alash Autonomy government; her cousin, Mäxmütfuat (Fuat) Tuqtarof, a journalist, also was a member of Russian Constituent Assembly. Her uncle, Ğärif Bädämşin, was a member of 1st and 2nd convocations of the State Duma of the Russian Empire.
