= Baqi Urmançe =

Russian painter

Baqi Urmance Бакый Урманче Baqi Urmançe
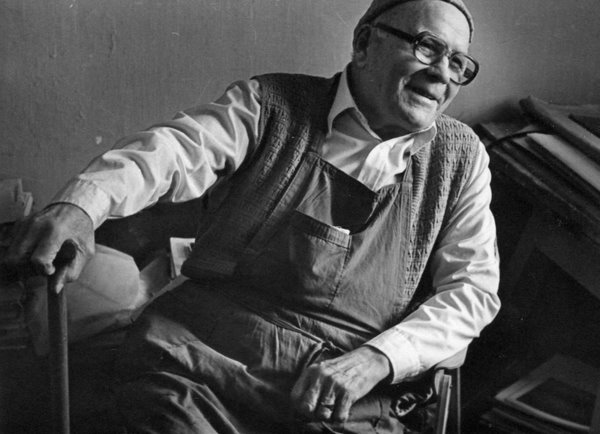
- Born: Ğäbdelbaqí İdris ulı Urmançiev; 23 February 1897; Kül Çerkene, Russian Empire (nowadays Tatarstan, Russian Federation)
- Died: 6 August 1990 (aged 93); Kazan, Tatar ASSR, USSR
- Known for: Sculpture, graphic, painting, Islamic calligraphy
- Awards: People's Artist of Tatar ASSR; People's Artist of the Russian SFSR; Ğabdulla Tuqay Tatar ASSR State Prize

Urmançe Ğäbdelbaqí İdris ulı (pronounced [urmanˈɕe ɣæbˌdelʲbʌˈqɯɪ idˌrisuˈlɯ]), a.k.a. Baqi Urmançe ([bʌˈqɯɪ urmanˈɕe]; Janalif: Baqi Urmance; Tatar Cyrillic: Урманче Бакый (Габделбакый) Идрис улы; Russian: Урманче́ Баки́ (Габделбакы́й) Идри́сович, Urmanche Baki (Gabdelbaky) Idrisovich; 23 February 1897 – 6 August 1990) was a Tatar painter, sculptor and graphic artist, and a pedagogue. He received the following awards and titles: People's Artist of Tatar ASSR (1960), People's Artist of the Russian SFSR (1982), and laureate of the Ğabdulla Tuqay Tatar ASSR State Prize (1967).

== Early life ==
He was born on February 23, 1897, in Kül Çerkene, a village in the modern Buinsky District of Tatarstan as Ğäbdelbaqí Urmançiev. In 1907 the Urmançievs moved to Kazan, where Baqi entered Möxämmädiä madrassah. Studying at the madrassa, he became interested in Oriental languages and Tatar poetry. Ğabdulla Tuqay's poetry particularly impressed him. Other hobbies of his included drawing and playing the violin. However, Urmançe failed to pass the entrance examinations for the Kazan Artist school, so in 1914 he began to work as a loader in the Urals and afterward in Siberia. In 1916, he was mobilized into the army. But his violin, pencil, and water-colors were always with him.

During the 1917 Russian Revolution Baqi became a soldier's deputy. In 1918 the Kazan Art School was reformed into the Free Art and Technical Workshops and in 1919 he became a student. It was his cherished dream. The beginning of this program of study was a critical moment in his life. He studied sculpture with G. I. Kozlov, painting with V. K. Timofeyev, and drawing with N. S. Shikalov. After a short mobilization into the Red Army, he was detached to the Moscow VKhUTEMAS in 1920, where he studied on two faculties. He studied sculpture in Anna Golubkina's workshop and drawing with A. Shevchenko. He also began to study at the Institute of Oriental Studies, where he improved his foreign language skills in Arabic, Turkish, and Persian, and began to study Western languages. Urmançe returned to Kazan in 1926 where he became a teacher at the Kazan Artist Secondary school. He also took part in the reconstruction of the Kazan Art School. Between 1926 and 1929 he lectured at the school and worked in the areas of drawing, etching and illustration. Urmançe attempted to restore the tradition of ceramic production in Kazan.

== Exiles ==
His successful work was interrupted in 1929, when he was arrested and exiled to the Solovki. However, in 1933 he was exempted ahead of time, came home for a short time in Kazan before leaving for Moscow, where he lived from 1934 to 1941. Urmançe participated in the First All-Russia Exhibition of the Young Artists. The graphic products exposed by him were noticed and appreciated by the art-viewing public of the Soviet capital. Urmançe became a member of the Moscow branch of Union of the Artists. Between 1937 and 1941 he was engaged in the creative task of decorating the All-Union Agricultural Exhibition. In 1940 the artist carried out a list of an outside surface of a drum of a dome of pavilion of the Bashkir ASSR. Urmançe has managed to find the expressive decision, in which basis the idea of a round dance laid.

In 1941–1949 he was sent on administrative exile to Almaty and Semipalatinsk. There he worked on illustrations of Kazakh poets and writers Abay, M. Auezov, S. Muqanov, and a Kazakh language translation of Tuqay. In 1946 the government issued the Minus 39 decree, by which exiles were forbidden to come within a certain distance of cities. From the next twelve years Baqi Urmançe lived in Central Asian cities: Samarqand, Toshkent, Almaty and Balkhash. Urmançe portrayed many Central Asian individuals in his work and painted many Central Asian landscapes. In 1952 he designed the House of Culture for the Balkhash Copper-Smelting Factory. Between 1949 and 1958 he lived in the Uzbek capital, working at the Toshkent Theatre and Art Institute. In 1956 he organized the sculpture department there.

== Return ==
1958 was the date in Urmançe's creative destiny. After a long absence, he moved to Kazan and began a constant residence. He was already sixty years old.

There is a art heritage for him. The people of Tatarstan revere the memory of the man who represented an entire epoch in the development of the art culture of the Tatar people. He died at the age of 93 on August 6, 1990. He was buried in the Yaña-Tatar Bistäse (Novotatarskoye) cemetery in Kazan.

A monument to Urmançe was erected in 1996, the museum in Kazan has been in operation since 1998.

== Major works ==
Paintings: Near the separator (1928), triptych Tatarstan (1976, 1985), Saltıq Meadow (1979); sculpture: Grief (1966), Spring Melodies (1968), Tulpar (1968); portraits of Tatar cultural workers, memorial complex of Ğabdulla Tuqay in village of Qırlay (1976), graphic illustration on poetry of Därdämänd häm Tuqay (1954–1968); the first manual of artistic education in the Tatar language (Moscow, 1924), several articles on art.
