= Xösäyen Yamaşev =

Yamaşev Xösäyen Minhacetdin ulı (pronounced [jʌˈmɑʃəf xœsæˈjen minhæʑetˈdin uˈlɯ] in Tatar; Cyrillic: Ямашев Хөсәен Минһаҗетдин улы; Russian: Яма́шев Хусаи́н Мингазетди́нович; transl. Yamashev Khusain Mingazetdinovich, 1882–1912) was a Tatar social democrat revolutionary and publicist. In the Soviet Tatarstan he was known as "The First Tatar Bolshevik".

Xösäyen Yamaşev was born in Kazan, in the family of affluent merchant. He studied in prestigious Märcaniä and Möxämmädiä madrassas in 1890-1893 and 1893-1897 correspondingly and in Tatar Teachers' School in 1897–1902. There he adopted the Marxist ideas. After entering Kazan State University he routinely visit the Marxist circle. Yamaşev entered the Russian Social Democratic Labour Party in 1903, in 1905 becoming a member of Kazan committee of the party.

During 1905 Revolution he prepared an armed revolt, organized workers' Marxist circles. Xösäyen Yamaşev managed the translation of the Marxist literature into the Tatar language. His brochures "Ürmäküç häm çeben" ("The Spider and the Fly"), "Berençe adım" ("The First Step") and many others, as well as leaflets, were printed in the cellar of his revolutionary friend Dulat Ali. In January 1907 Yamaşev established the first legal Tatar Bolshevist gazette Ural in Orenburg, an organ of RSDLP Ural and Ufa Committee. Its official chief editor was Xösäyen's wife Xädiçä Yamaşeva. In May 1907 the Ural was prohibited and Yamaşev had returned to Kazan. Since summer of 1907 he lived in Kazan, often changing residence on an effort of conspiracy. Yamaşev died in 1912 because of a cerebral hemorrhage, five years before the Bolshevik Revolution. He was buried on Yaña-Tatar cemetery. In 1971 Xösäyen Yamaşev Prize was established in Tatarstan for journalists.
