= Collegium for the implementation of the Idel-Ural State =

Short-lived Tatar political committee in 1918

Collegium for the implementation of the Idel-Ural State (Tatar: Идел-Урал өлкәсен гамәлгә кертү һәйьәте) was created in January 7–8, 1918 by the decision of Millät Mäclese. Its chairman was Ğalimcan Şäräf, deputies – İlyas Alkin, Säläx Atnağulof, Ğäziz Ğöbäydullin, Säğit Yanqılıçef, Fatix Möxämmätyarof, Fatix Säyfi-Qazanlı, Näcip Xälfin, candidate members – Ğäni Abızof, Şähit Äxmädief, Sadıyq Ğabdulof, İsmäğil Ğabdi.

The collegium had to negotiate with the Turkic-Tatar national associations and public organizations, announce the creation of the Idel-Ural State together with them, adopt the provisional constitution of the future autonomy, hold a constituent conference in Ufa, form a provisional government and define the borders of the state.

After the publication of the Regulations on the Tatar-Bashkir SSR and the defeat in April 1918 of national organizations (Xärbi Şura, Milli Şura and others), the activities of the collegium were banned.
