= Sahib-Garey Said-Galiev =

Soviet politician (1894 - 1938)

- Сәхибгәрәй Сәетгалиев; Säxibğäräy Säyetğäliev
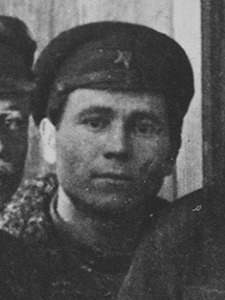
- Said-Galiev in 1919

People's Commissar for Nationalities of the Kazan Soviet Republic
- In office 1918–1918
- Preceded by: Position established
- Succeeded by: Position disestablished

Chairman of the Council of People's Commissars of the Tatar ASSR
- In office 1920–1921
- Preceded by: Position established
- Succeeded by: Kashaf Mukhtarov

Chairman of the Council of People's Commissars of the Crimean ASSR
- In office 1921–1924
- Preceded by: Position established
- Succeeded by: Osman Deren-Ayerly

Personal details
- Born: 6 March 1894 Ufa, Russian Empire
- Died: 29 October 1938 (aged 44) Moscow, Russian Soviet Federative Socialist Republic, Soviet Union
- Party: RSDLP (Bolsheviks)(1916–1918); All-Union Communist Party (Bolsheviks) (1918–1937)

Sahib-Garey Said-Galiev (Tatar: Сәхибгәрәй Сәетгалиев, Säxibğäräy Säyetğäliev, Russian: Сахиб-Гарей Саид-Галиев; 6 March 1894 – 29 October 1938) was a Tatar revolutionary and Soviet politician.

== Biography ==
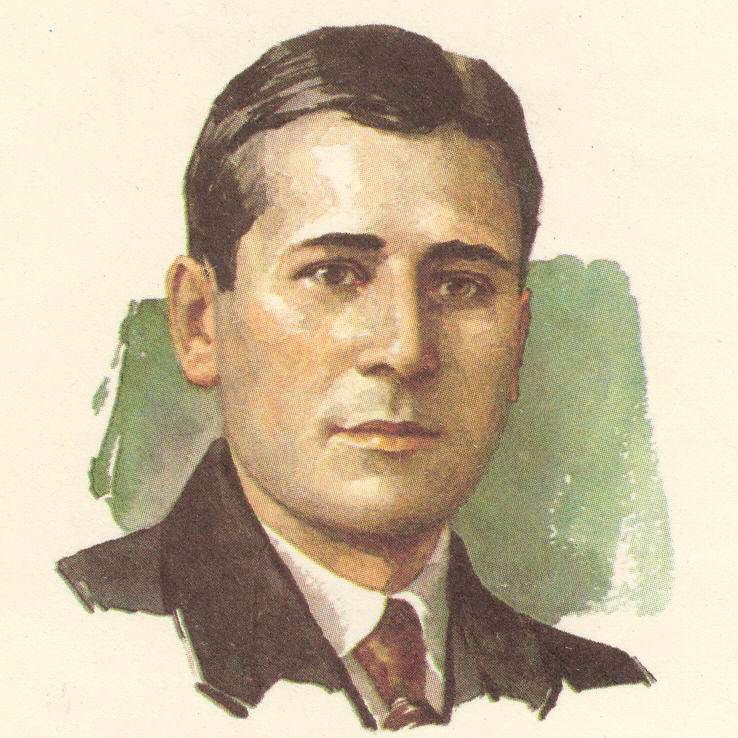
Portrait, undated

Born in Ufa into a working-class family, in 1915 he was drafted into the army, in 1916 he was an agitator of the committee of the RSDLP in Yekaterinburg.

After the February Revolution of 1917 he became a member of the regimental committee and the Yekaterinburg Soviet and chairman of the garrison committee of Muslim soldiers. In March 1917 he joined the Bolshevik Party. From July 1917, chairman of the Ural Regional Muslim Council. In 1918–1919, he was the Commissar for Nationalities of the Kazan Soviet Workers' and Peasants' Republic, a member of the Tatar-Bashkir Bureau of the Ufa Provincial Committee, and a teacher of Muslim military-political courses at the Political Department of the Central Muslim Military Collegium. In November 1919, a delegate to the 2nd All-Russian Congress of Communist Organizations of the Peoples of the East (CONV), was elected chairman of the Central Bureau of the CONV under the Central Committee of the Russian Communist Party (b).

In 1920, Galiev became chairman of the Revolutionary Committee of the Tatar Autonomous Soviet Socialist Republic. In 1920-1922 he was Chairman of the Council of People's Commissars of the Tatar ASSR. During his time as chairman, there was an assassination attempt on Said-Galiev. Two opposing groups formed within the Tatar ASSR, one led by Said-Galiyev and the other one led by Mirsaid Sultan-Galiev. The chairman of the special commission of the All-Russian Central Executive Committee, which investigated the assassination attempt on Said-Galiev, affirmed that "neither the 1st nor the 2nd group should be in the Tatar Republic".

From 1921 to 1924 he was chairman of the Council of People's Commissars of the Crimean ASSR. On December 30, 1921, he became a member of the plenipotentiary delegation from the RSFSR at the First All-Union Congress of Soviets, signatory of the Treaty on the Formation of the Soviet Union.

In 1924 he was sent to Moscow. In 1924-1925 he was a member of the Central Control Commission of the RCP(b). From 1924 to 1926 he worked in the People's Commissariat of the Workers' and Peasants' Inspectorate of the Soviet Union. From 1928 to 1931 he was deputy manager, manager of the Teplo i Sila trust (Moscow). In 1931-1933 he was a member of the board of the People's Commissariat of Labor of the USSR. From 1933 he worked in the People's Commissariat of Communication Routes of the Soviet Union.

He was elegate of the 2nd and 3rd congresses of the Communist International. He was elected a member of the All-Russian Central Executive Committee and the Central Executive Committee of the Soviet Union.

During the Great Purge, Galiev was arrested in 1938 and was sentenced to death the shortly after. He was executed on 29 October 1938.

Sahib-Garey Said-Galiev was rehabilitated in 1955.

== Memory ==
A boulevard in Ufa, is named after Sahib-Garey. In Kazan there is Said-Galiyev Street, as well as the Said-Galiyev Sahib-Garey Palace of Culture.
