= Näqi İsänbät =

Tatar-language writer

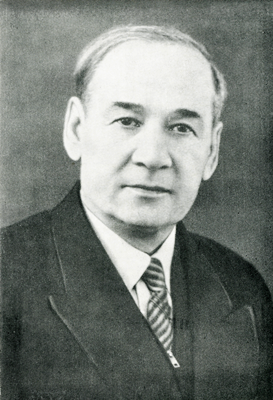
Isanbet 1991.

Näqi İsänbät (Tatar: Нәкый Исәнбәт, IPA: [næˈqi isænˈbæt]; Russian: Наки Исанбет, romanized: Naki Isanbet; December 29, 1899 – September 12, 1992), also anglicized as Nakie Isanbet, was a Tatar-language writer, encyclopaedist, poet, playwright, prosaist, children's writer, specialist in folklore, and philologist. He collected and composed defining and phraseological Tatar dictionaries.

Born Näqi Siracetdin ulı Zakirov (Tatar: Нәкый Сираҗетдин улы Закиров) or Naki Sirazetdinovich Zakirov (Russian: Наки Сиразетдинович Закиров) into a family of a village mullah in the village Maloyaz in the Republic of Bashkortostan. He began attending the village madrasa and continued his studies at the Husania madrasah in Ufa. Being a student of the famous Kazan madrasah Möxämmädiä, at the age of 15 he started publishing his works in magazines.

At that time his interest in regard with a word and the language began arising. Through all his life Isanbet retained his utter love for people's art and his mother tongue.

His verses became a basis for folk songs: Winding water, Accordion, You were playing a pipe. His plays (Hoja Nasreddin, Zifa, Briefcase, Musa Cälil, Fugitives) always were in the repertoires of the Tatar theatres.

Näqi İsänbät wrote for children, including folk-lore genre. A unique edition of Tatar national proverbs in three volumes has been awarded the Ğabdulla Tuqay State Prize.

Näqi İsänbät introduced into cultural turn a heroic epos of the Tatar people - (dastan) İdegäy, first published in 1940. When writing its summary text he used the principle of creative restoration. The new and more precise variant of the epos was ready but the war and later on prohibition of the then authority hampered its publication. The materials had been published in the late 1980s with no appropriate reference to the author.
