= Akkul =

Akkul Аккуль
- Village
- Location within Bashkortostan Location within Russia
- Coordinates: 54°23′N 55°56′E
- Country: Russia
- Region: Bashkortostan
- District: Karmaskalinsky District
- Time zone: UTC+5:00

Akkul (Russian: Аккуль; Bashkir: Аҡкүл, Aqkül) is a rural locality (a village) in Staromusinsky Selsoviet, Karmaskalinsky District, Bashkortostan, Russia. The population was 38 as of 2010. There is 1 street.

== Geography ==
Akkul is located 25 km northwest of Karmaskaly (the district's administrative centre) by road. Novoandreyevka is the nearest rural locality.
