= Sadri Maksudi Arsal =

Tatar politician

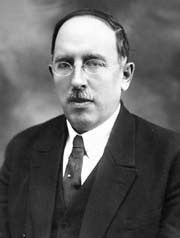
- Sadri Maksudi Arsal in 1930s
- Born: Sadreddīn Nizāmeddin al-Maqsūdī; 1878; Taşsu, Kazan Governorate, Russian Empire
- Died: 20 February 1957 (aged 76); Istanbul, Turkey
- Education: Sorbonne University
- Known for: President of Idel-Ural State
- Spouse: Kamile Arsal

Sadri Maksudi Arsal (İske imlâ Tatar: صدرالدین نظام الدین المقصودی; Tatar: Садри Максуди; Russian: Садретди́н Низаметди́нович Максу́дов; Turkish: Sadri Maksudi Arsal 1878 – 20 February 1957) was one of the leading figures in the national awakening of Tatars in Russia during the early 1900s. He worked as a writer, lawyer, politician, professor, lecturer, researcher of Turkic languages and a delegate of the League of Nations. He was the president of the short-lived Idel-Ural State.

== Name ==
His birthname was Sadreddīn Nizāmeddin al-Maqsūdī, and while operating as a congressman in State Duma, he used the Russified version Sadrutdin Nisamutdinovich Maksudov (Садретдин Низаметдинович Максудов). Later in Turkey, he added "Arsal" to his name and from 1935 forwards went by the name he is now known for.

== Biography ==
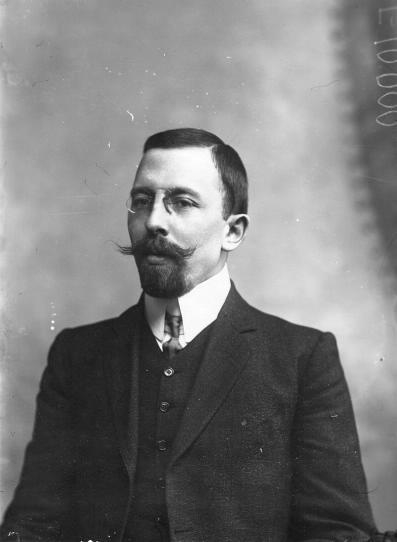
Sadri Maksudi Arsal in 1907

Sadri Maksudi Arsal was born in 1878 in the village of Taşsu near Kazan, Russian Empire. After graduating from the Teacher's Institute in Kazan in 1900, he traveled to Istanbul where he stayed for a while. Two years later, Arsal went to study in Sorbonne University, where he eventually graduated as Master of Sciences in Law. When he returned to Russia, he joined the Islamic Constitutional Party. Arsal operated as a representative of the District of Kazan in the second Duma in 1907 and the third in 1908. Later, Arsal was elected as the president of the short-lived Idel-Ural State. Before that, he had operated as a chairman of a national assembly held in Ufa in 1917, regarding given state.

In 1918, after the rise of Bolshevism and the breaking up of the Islamic party he was a part of, Sadri Maksudi Arsal escaped through Saint Petersburg to Finland, where he stayed in Tampere, at the home of local Finnish Tatar named Imad Samaletdin. From there, the next year he continued his trip to Paris, where at the Peace Conference he spoke for the political rights of people living in the Idel Ural region, though he was not able to produce a positive result with his speech.

In 1922, Sadri Maksudi Arsal returned briefly to Finland, because his family had fled there from Soviet Union. Together they traveled to Germany, settling in Berlin. While living there, Arsal focused mainly on historical studies and refrained from any kind of political activities. After a while, he moved to Paris where he gave lectures in Turkish history at the Slavic Faculty of Sorbonne. In 1925, Arsal moved to Turkey, where among other things he worked as a lecturer and later as professor of legal history and philosophy in universities of Ankara and Istanbul, and was eventually awarded with an honorary title.

Sadri Maksudi Arsal published multiple literary works in the fields of his studies, for example Türk dili için, which deals with the development of Turkish language and in where he proposes different ways of which it could be made better; like removing foreign influences from it. Arsal was elected as member of the Turkish Parliament for three legislative periods. He died in 1957 in Istanbul.

== Bibliography ==
- Margagliotta, Giusy Maria Ausilia; Robiglio, Andrea Aldo (2012). Art, Intellect and Politics: A Diachronic Perspective: Studies on the Interaction of Art, Thought and Power (in German). BRILL. ISBN 9789004242203.
