= Möxämmädiä =

Madrasa in Kazan, Russia

Coordinates: 55.7820°N 49.1108°E

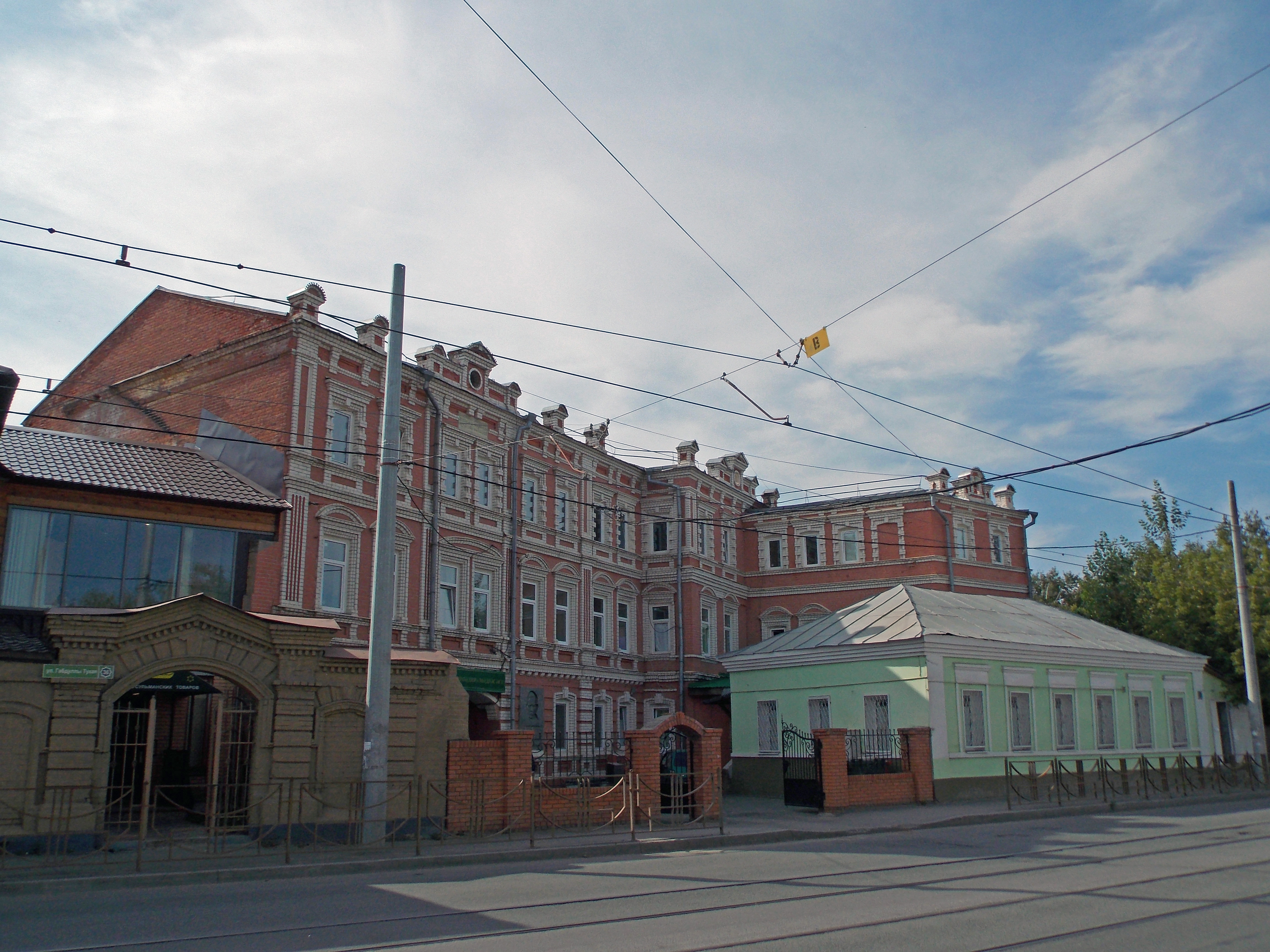
The building of the former madrasa.

Möxəmmədiyə (Tatar: Мөхәммәдия, Möxämmädiyä, محمدية) was a madrasa in Kazan that was attached to Ğəliev Mosque.

== Brief history ==
It was created in 1882 by Ğəlimcan Barudi with the assistance of Zəynulla Rəsül and received its name in honour of Möxəmmətcan Ğəli, a merchant, at whose expense madrasa's building was constructed. The sole head of Möxəmmədiyə was Ğəlimcan Barudi; during his absence his duties were performed by his junior brother, Ğabdraxman.

By the beginning of the 20th century, Möxəmmədiyə was the biggest madrasa in Idel-Ural region with about 800 shakirds (students) studying simultaneously; its educational programs and organization of the educational process was a model for many madrasas in the region. Apart from religious disciplines, there were taught Tatar and Russian languages, mathematics, geography, natural sciences, medicine, hygiene, general history, history of Tatar people and of Russia, pedagogy and other non-religious subjects.

== Famous teachers and students ==
- Teachers: Ğəziz Ğöbəydullin, Borhan Şərəf, Əxmətcan Mostafin, Kəşşaf Tərcemani, Əbübəker Teregulov, Səyetgərəy Alkin, Yosıf Aqçura and others.
- Fatix Əmirxan, Xuca Bədiği, Məcit Ğafuri, Ğəliəsğar Kamal, Baqi Urmançe, Kərim Tinçurin, Xösəyen Yamaşev, Nəqi İsənbət are among the famous students of Möxəmmədiyə.
