= Sukkulovo, Yermekeyevsky District, Republic of Bashkortostan =

Sukkulovo Суккулово
- Selo
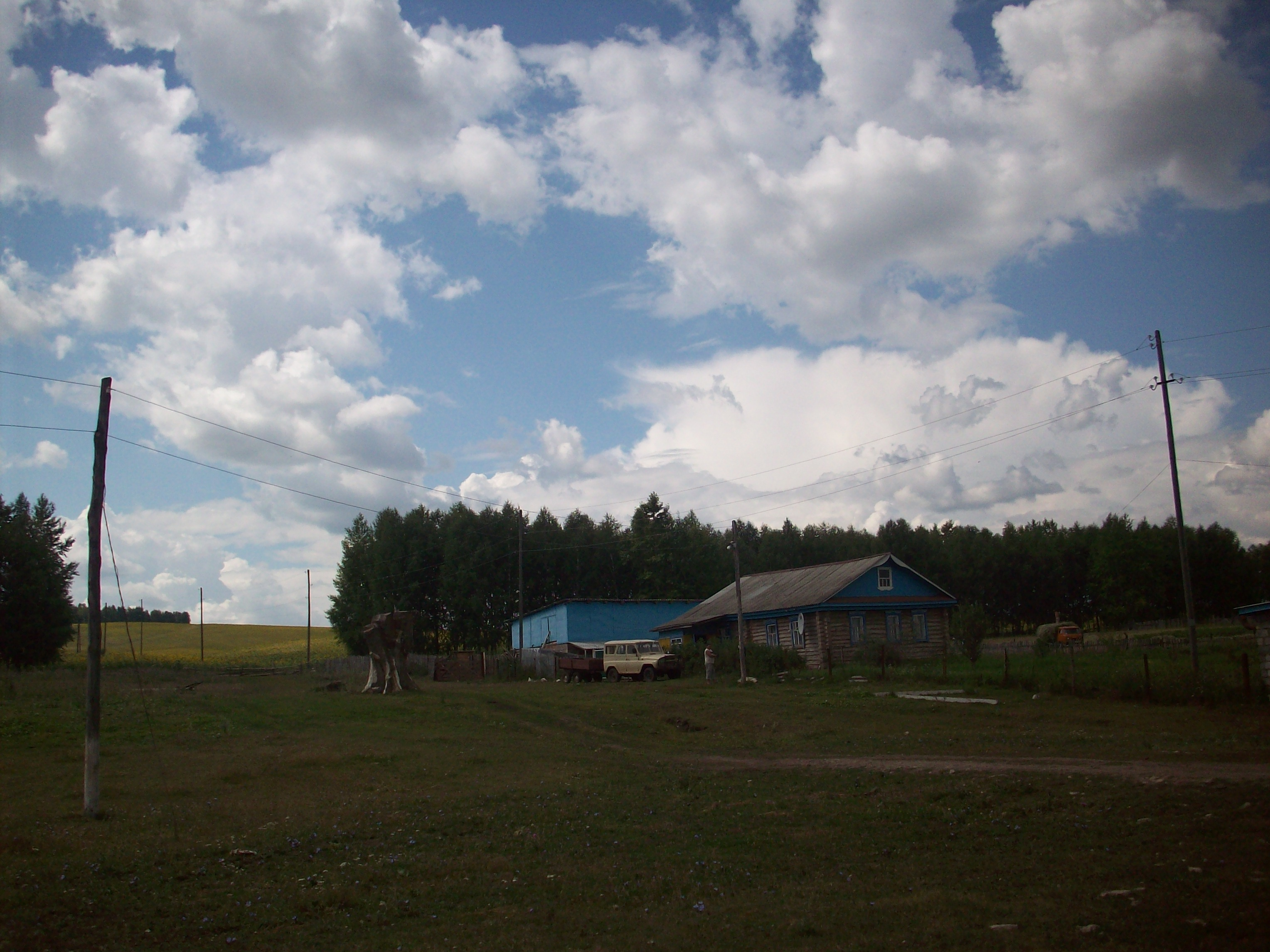

- Location within Bashkortostan Location within Russia
- Coordinates: 54°13′N 53°43′E
- Country: Russia
- Region: Bashkortostan
- District: Yermekeyevsky District
- Time zone: UTC+5:00

Sukkulovo (Russian: Суккулово; Bashkir: Һыуыҡҡул, Hıwıqqul) is a rural locality (a selo) and the administrative centre of Sukkulovsky Selsoviet, Yermekeyevsky District, Bashkortostan, Russia. The population was 777 as of 2010. There are 11 streets.

== Geography ==
Sukkulovo is located 22 km north of Yermekeyevo (the district's administrative centre) by road. Mikhaylovka is the nearest rural locality.
