= Milli İdärä =

Milli İdärä (Tatar: Милли Идарә, Milli İdärä, ملى ادارە) was the national government of Muslim Turko-Tatars of Inner Russia and Siberia that was elected by the delegates of Millät Mäclese and located in Ufa (Öfä) from January 11, 1918, to April 21, 1918. Its Chairman was Sadri Mäqsudi, with İbneämin Äxtämef being deputy chairman.

Its official press organ was "Möxtäriät" (Autonomy) journal.

Three ministries (departments) were created within Milli İdärä:

- Finance Ministry (Maliä Näzäräte, Chairman – Şäyxulla Alkin, members – Zäynedtin Ağafurof, Ğöbäydulla Bubıy, Sälimgäräy Cantürin, Ğärif Kärimi, Ğäli Qormayıf, Latıyf Yawşef, Märdelğälim Mäxmütef);
- Education Ministry (Mäğärif Näzäräte, Chairman – Näcip Qorbanğälief, members – İbrahim Bikqolof, Ğäli Yänekäyef, Zakir Qadıyri, İsmäğil Ütämeşef, Kälimulla Xäsänef, Ğömär Tereğulof);
- Ministry of Religious Affairs (Diniä Näzäräte, Chairman – Ğälimcan Barudi (mufti), members (qadis) – Riza'etdin Fäxretdin, Salixcan Urmanof, Käşşaf Tärcemani, Möxlisä Bubıy, Ğabdulla Söläymani, Xöccätelxäkim Mäxmütef).

In April 1918, activities of Milli Idärä were banned by the Soviet government (except for Diniä Näzäräte, which was allowed to continue its activities with the condition of non-interference in political affairs), and its property was confiscated; some of the members resumed their activities in Petropavlovsk, until it was captured by the Bolsheviks.
