= Bazarnye Mataki =

Bazarnye Mataki Базарные Матаки
- Selo
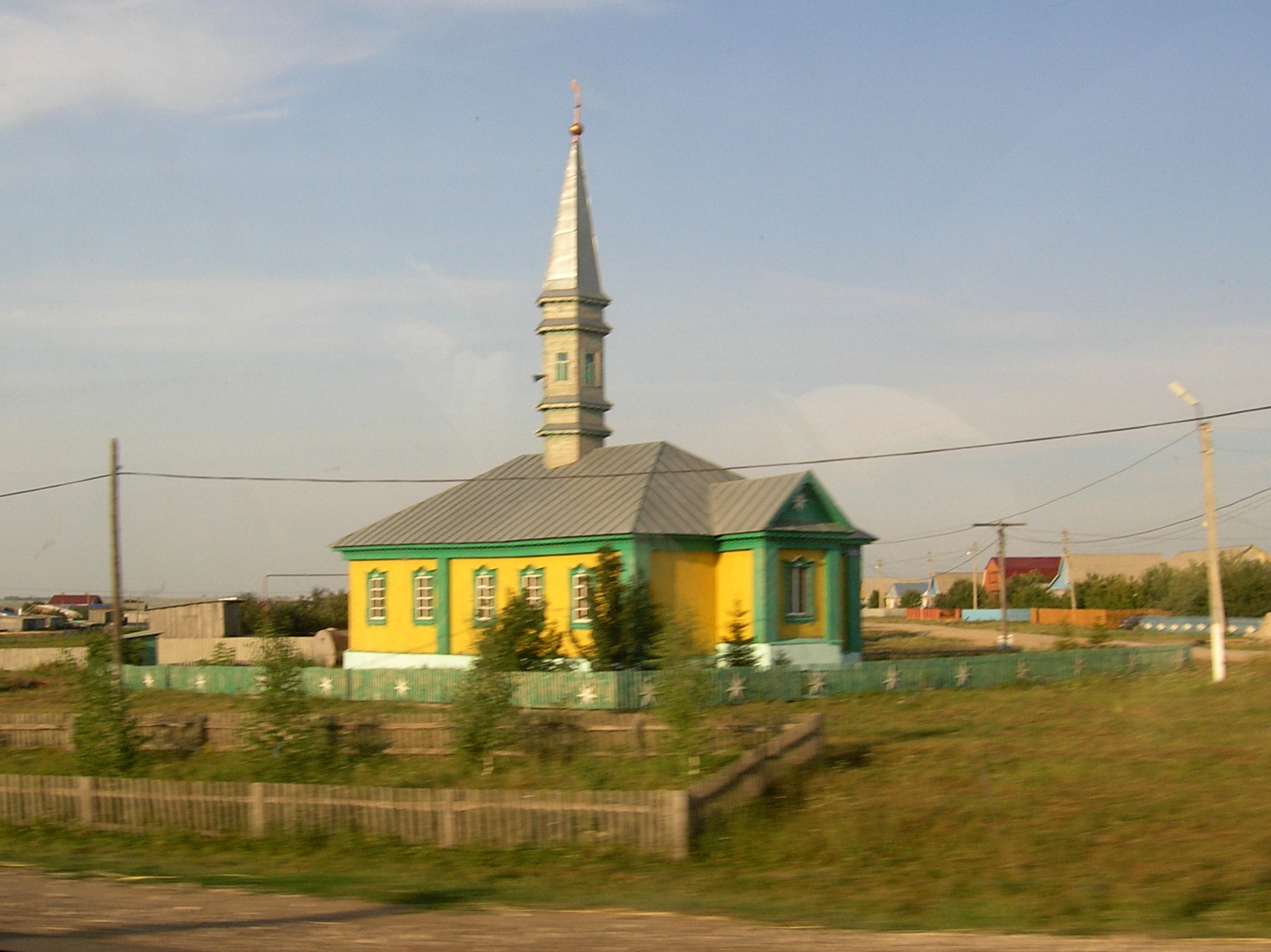
- Interactive map of Bazarnye Mataki
- Location of Bazarnye Mataki Bazarnye Mataki (Tatarstan)
- Coordinates: 54°54′19″N 49°55′33″E
- Country: Russia
- Federal subject: Tatarstan
- Founded: 1730
- Elevation: 130 m (430 ft)

Population (2010 Census)
  - Total: 5,899
  - Estimate (2021): 6,257 (+6.1%)

Administrative status
  - Subordinated to: Alkeyevsky District
- Time zone: UTC+3 (MSK)
- Postal code: 422870
- OKTMO ID: 92607408101

Bazarnye Mataki (Russian: Базáрные Матáки; Tatar: Базарлы Матак) is a rural locality (a selo) and the administrative center of Alkeyevsky District in Tatarstan, Russia. Population: 5,899 (2010 census);
