= Ibniyamin Akhtyamov =

Russian lawyer and deputy

Ibniyamin Akhtyamov Russian: Ибниямин Ахтямов Tatar: Ибниамин Абуссуд улы Әхтәмов
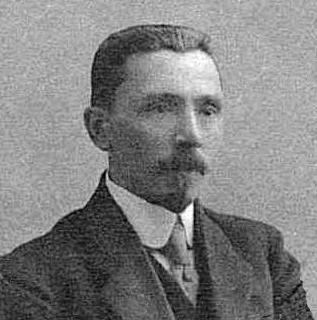
- Akhtyamov in 1913

Deputy of the Fourth Imperial Duma
- In office 20 November 1912 – 6 October 1917
- Monarch: Nicholas II / monarchy abolished
- Succeeded by: post abolished

Personal details
- Born: Ibniyamin Abusugutovich Akhtyamov; 6 November 1877 Ufa, Russian Empire
- Died: 1941 RSFSR, USSR
- Party: Socialist Revolutionary Party

Ibniyamin Abusugutovich Akhtyamov (sometimes — Abusugudovich, Russian: Ибниямин Абусугутович (Абуссугудович) Ахтя́мов; 6 November 1877, Ufa — 1941, USSR) was a lawyer and a deputy of the Fourth Imperial Duma from the Ufa Governorate between 1912 and 1917. He was a chairperson of the All-Russian Congress of Representatives of Muslim Public Organizations, held in Petrograd. In December 1916, he was a lawyer at the trial of the participants in the Central Asian insurrection. After the start of the Russian Civil War, he took part in the Committee of Members of the Constituent Assembly. In Soviet era, he was arrested in 1938 and died in 1941. His brother was a menshevik, Ibrahim Akhtyamov (1880—1931).

== Literature ==
- Усманова Д. М. Ахтямов Ибниямин Абусугутович (in Russian) // Государственная дума Российской империи: 1906—1917 / Б. Ю. Иванов, А. А. Комзолова, И. С. Ряховская. — Москва: РОССПЭН, 2008. — P. 29. — 735 p. — ISBN 978-5-8243-1031-3.
- Ахтямов (in Russian) // Члены Государственной думы (портреты и биографии): Четвертый созыв, 1912—1917 г. / сост. М. М. Боиович. — Москва: Тип. Т-ва И. Д. Сытина, 1913. — P. 355. — LXIV, 454, [2] p.
- Таиров Н. Дальнейшая судьба Ибниамина Ахтямова // Гасырлар авазы — Эхо веков. — 2000. — № 3/4. — ISSN 2073-7483. (in Russian)
