= Alkeyevsky District =

Alkeyevsky District Алькеевский район (Russian)
- District

Other transcription(s)
  - Tatar: Әлки районы
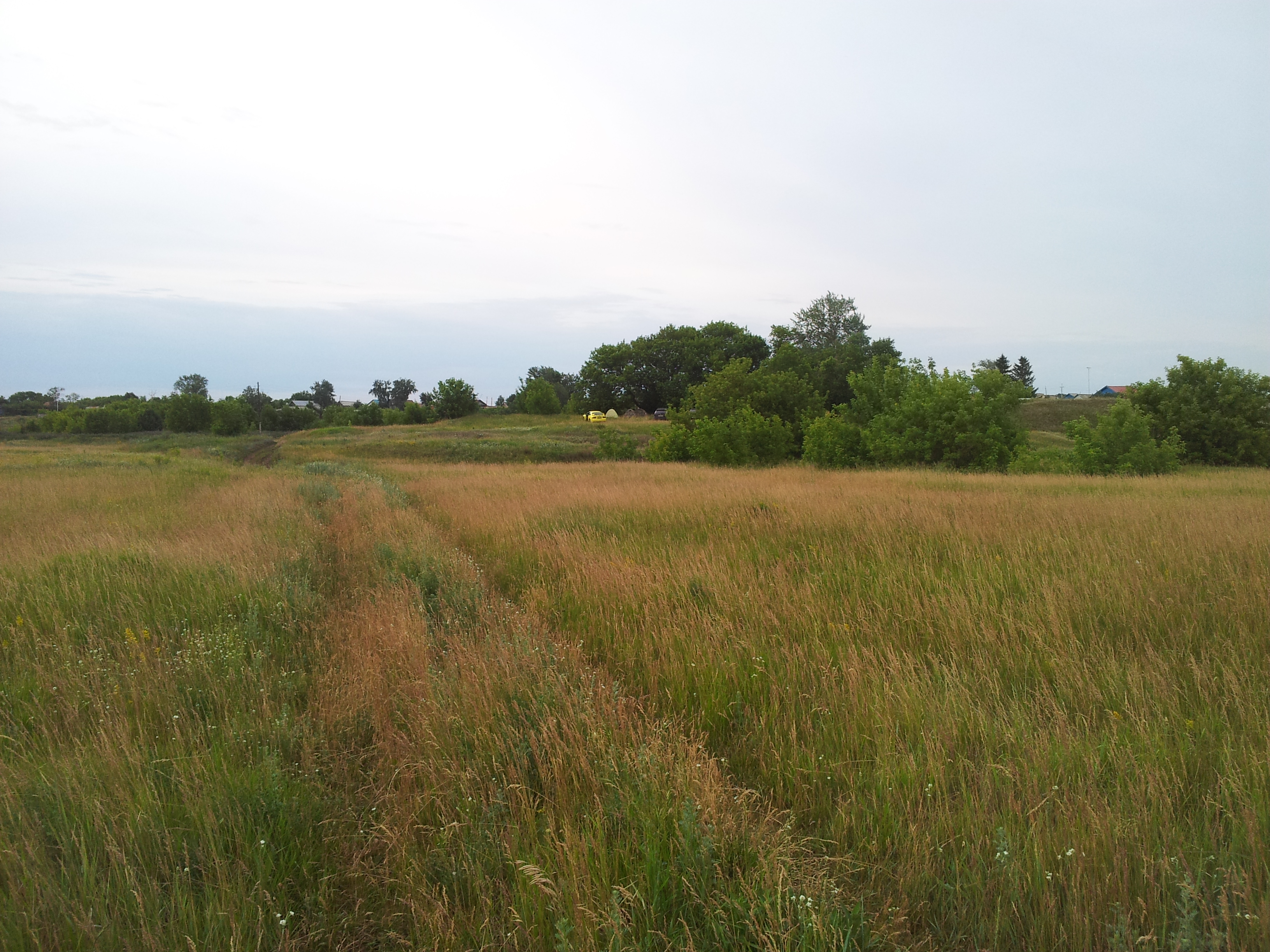
- Landscape in Alkeyevsky District

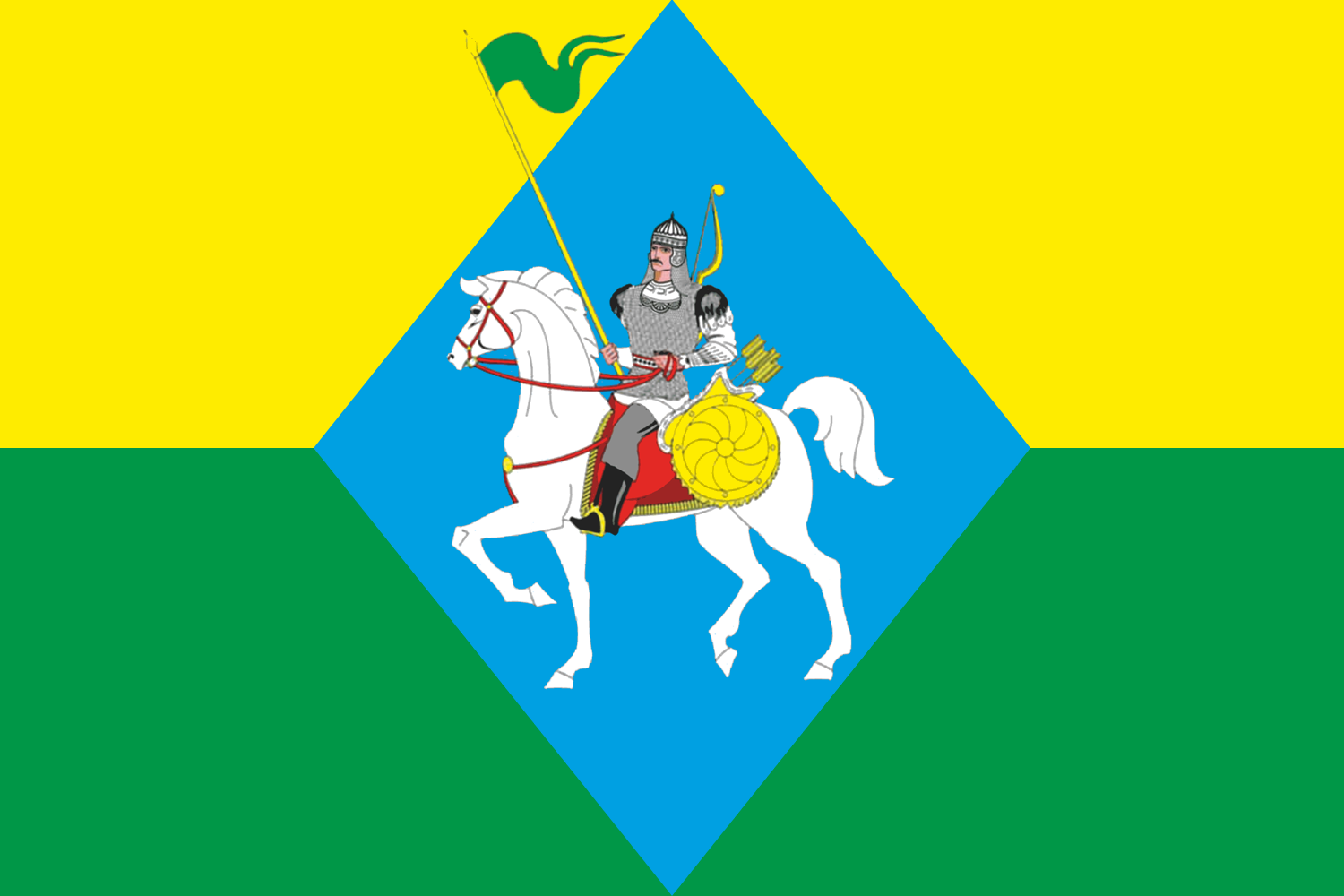
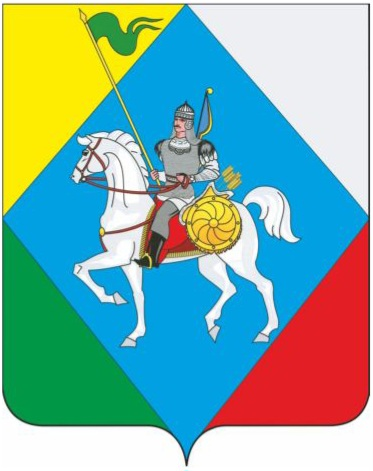
- Flag Coat of arms
- Location of Alkeyevsky District in the Republic of Tatarstan
- Coordinates: 54°48′N 49°56′E
- Country: Russia
- Federal subject: Republic of Tatarstan
- Established: 10 August 1930
- Administrative center: Bazarnye Mataki

Area
  - Total: 1,726.8 km^{2} (666.7 sq mi)

Population (2010 Census)
  - Total: 19,991
  - Density: 11.577/km^{2} (29.984/sq mi)
  - Urban: 0%
  - Rural: 100%

Administrative structure
  - Inhabited localities: 70 rural localities

Municipal structure
  - Municipally incorporated as: Alkeyevsky Municipal District
  - Municipal divisions: 0 urban settlements, 21 rural settlements
- Time zone: UTC+3 (MSK)
- OKTMO ID: 92607000
- Website: http://alkeevskiy.tatarstan.ru/

Alkeyevsky District (Russian: Альке́евский райо́н; Tatar: Әлки районы) is a territorial administrative unit and municipal district of the Republic of Tatarstan located within the Russian Federation. The total land area of the Alkeyevsky District is 1726,8 km2. The district includes 70 urban and 21 rural settlements. The administrative center is the village of Bazarnye Mataki. As of 2020, 18,675 people resided in the district.

== Geography ==
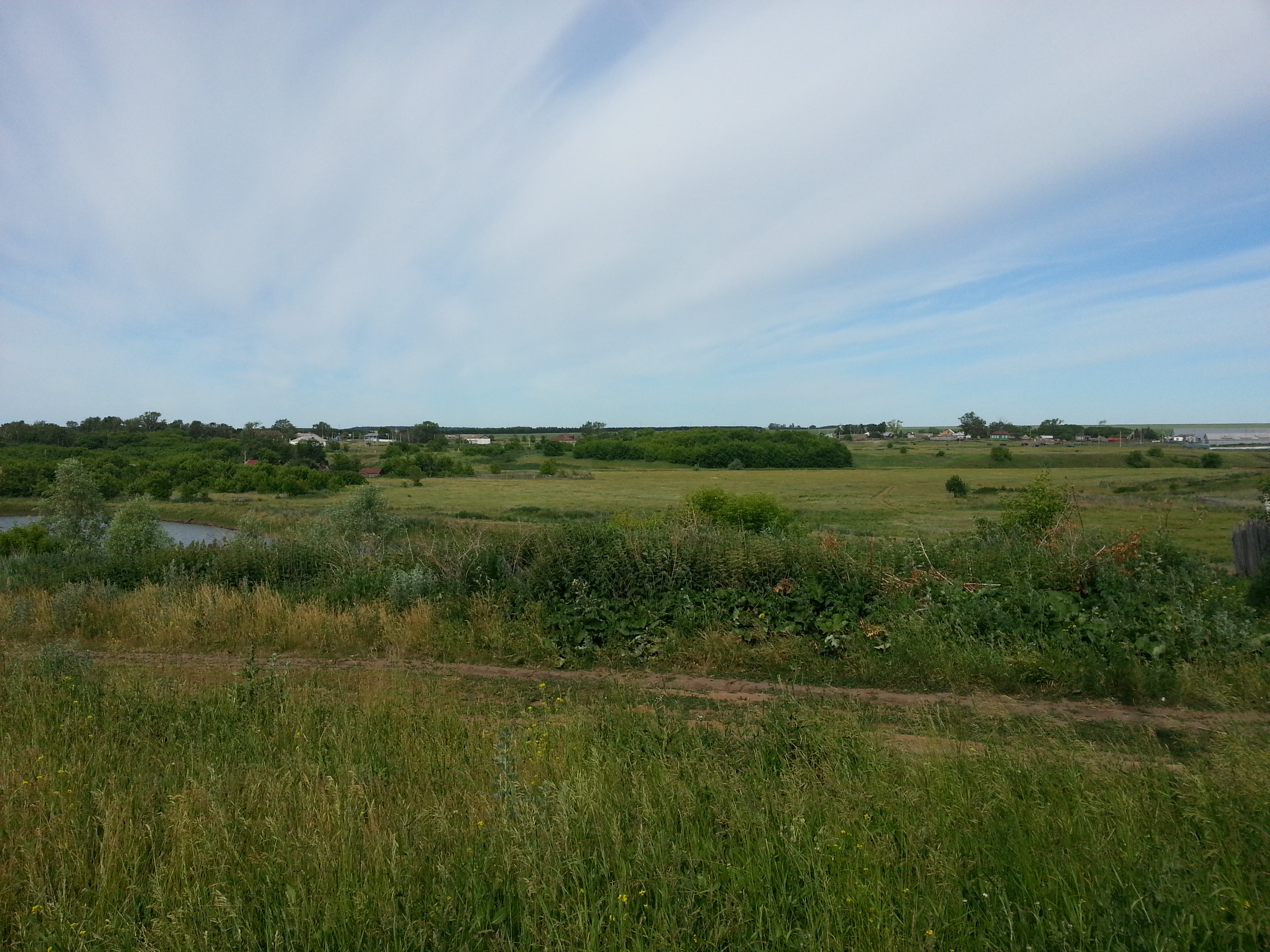
Local relief

The Alkeyevsky District is located in the south the republic of Tatarstan. It borders the Samara and Ulyanovsk Oblasts as well as the Spassky, Alekseevsky and Nurlatsky districts of Tatarstan.

Forested areas remain well preserved in the northern part of the district. The main rivers flowing through the district are the Maly Cheremshan (tributaries of the Ata, Shiya, Yukhmachka), Aktay and Bezdna rivers.

== Coat of arms ==
A horseman is prominently displayed on the district coat of arms, symbolizing the historical links between the state of Volga Bulgaria and the district. Four multi-colored fields symbolize the changing of seasons and the agricultural focus of the region. Gold represents yield, abundance, stability, respect and intelligence. Silver is a symbol of purity, perfection, peace and understanding while red stands for labor, strength, courage and beauty; the blue in the center stands for honor, nobility, spirituality; green signifies nature, health and growth in life; purple invokes fame, honor and greatness; while black is a symbol of wisdom, modesty, eternity of being.

The flag was designed on the basis of the district coat of arms. It has a rectangular form divided horizontally by yellow and green stripes. A blue diamond with a rider in the center reaches the top and bottom of the canvas.

== History ==
In the Stone Age, the territory of the district was one of the centers of human settlement in the Middle Volga region. The Staronokhrat, Staromatak and Tyugulbaevskoe hillforts, around 126 kurgans and 130 villages are among the significant archaeological sites in the district known to scholars. Later, the territory of the modern region became part of Volga Bulgaria. According to one local legend, the name of the region originates from the Bulgar Alp-batyr.

Until 1920, the territory was part of the Spassky district of the Kazan Governorate. Later it would be transferred to the Spassky canton of the TASSR. The Alkeevsky district was formed on August 10, 1930. In February 1935, the Kuznechikhinsky District was separated from the southern and western parts of the district.

Initially, the administrative center of the district was the village of Alkeevo (now Nizhnee Alkeevo). In 1937 (according to other sources - in 1932) the regional center was relocated to Bazarnye Mataki. In February 1944, the Yukhmachinsky district (abolished in 1956) was formed by marrying the southern part of the Alkeevsky and the eastern part of the Kuznechikhinsky districts. In October 1960, most of the territory of the abolished Kuznechikhinsky district was transferred to the Alkeevsky district. On February 1, 1963, as part of reforms to the administrative-territorial structure of Tatarstan, the Alkeevsky district was abolished with its territory being transferred to the Kuibyshevsky district. Yet two years later, on January 12, 1965, the district would find itself restored to its current borders.

Ferdinat Davletshin was appointed head of the district in 1999, holding this position until 2014. In September 2015, this post was taken by Nikoshin Alexander.

== Economy ==
According to 2019 figures, the average monthly salary in the district amounted to 25,620 rubles for employees of organizations; 25,617 rubles for employees of municipal institutions of culture and art, and 17,727 rubles for preschool organizations. In the period from 2010 to 2020, the ratio of wages to the minimum consumer budget increased from 1.88 to 2.3 times, and the unemployment rate slightly decreased in the period 2013 to 2020 from 1.58% to 1.11%.

=== Agriculture ===
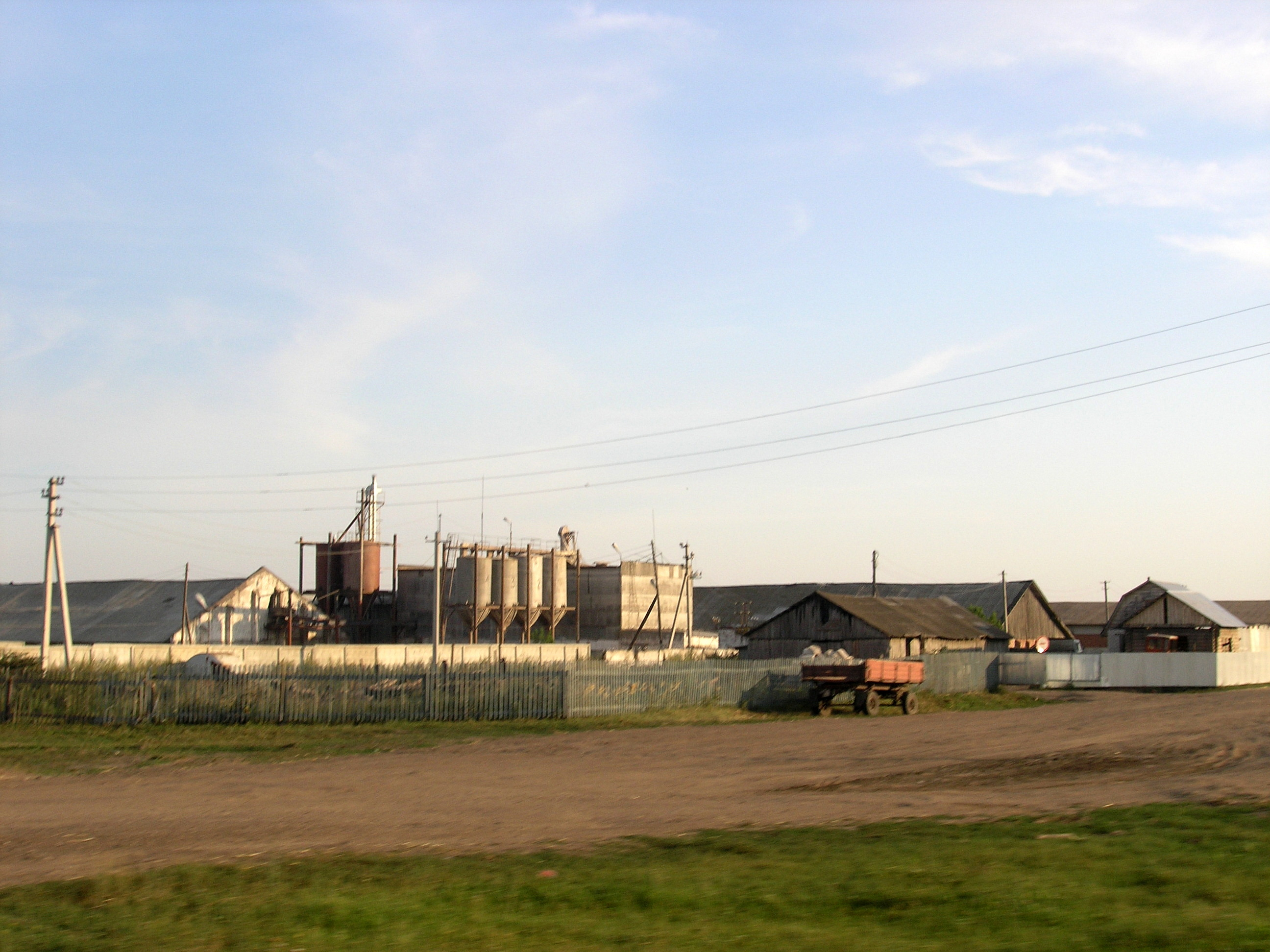
Agro-industrial complex in Bazarny Mataki

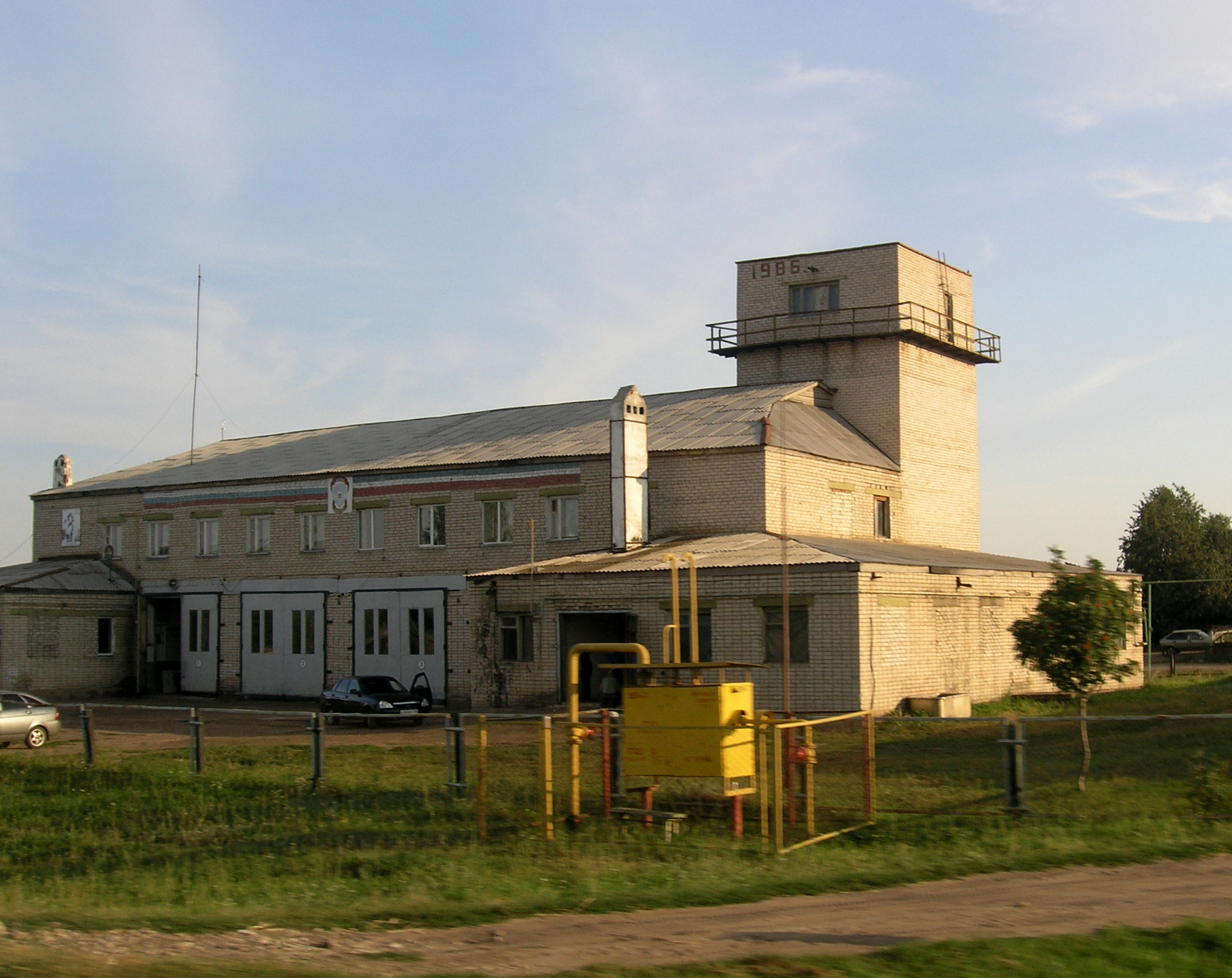
Fire department in Bazarny Mataki

The driving sector of the regional economy is agriculture, with a focus on pastoral farming and pig farming. The district agro-industrial complex produces about 80% of the gross regional product. Over 125 thousand hectares have been allocated for the needs of agriculture, of which 114.8 thousand hectares are arable land. Large food enterprises for the production of bread, bakery, pasta and cereals, flour, vegetable oils, semi-finished products from meat and dairy products operate in the district. Among these main regional enterprises are "Krasny Vostok Agro", the industrial pig-breeding complex "Salman", "Khuzangaevskoye", "Yash Kuch" and 43 private peasant farms.

From January to September 2020, regional companies shipped goods worth 391 million rubles. For comparison, for the entire 2013th the same economical indicator constituted only 104 million. In the first half of 2020, gross agricultural output amounted to almost 1.15 billion rubles (for the entire 2013 this figure was almost 1.8 billion).

=== Investment potential ===
Investments in fixed assets for the first half of 2020 in the Alkeevsky district amounted to 592 thousand rubles, or 0.3% of total investment in Tatarstan. By the share of investment in 2020, the leading sectors are agricultural development, hunting and fishing (a total of 118 million rubles) and the electricity sector (almost 26 million). According to figures released by the Federal State Statistics Service in 2019, the district attracted almost 1.3 billion rubles in investment (in addition to budgetary funds and tax income from small businesses), by comparison the same figure in 2018 constituted 1.1 billion rubles.

=== Transportation ===
The village Bazarny Mataki is located 152 km south-east of Kazan and 72 km north-east of the nearest railway station "Bryandino". There is an inactive airport serving local airlines and regional aviation located in Bazarny Mataki. The main roads are the 16K-0191 Alekseevskoe - Bazarny Mataki - Vysoky Kolok (part of the Kazan - Samara route), 16K-0248 Bazaar Mataki - Mamykovo (to Nurlat) and 16K-0264 Bazaar Mataki - Bolgar, Bazaar Mataki - Izh-Boriskino "," Nizhnee Alkeevo - Kuznechikha "," Bilyarsk - Chuvash Brod ".

== Ecology ==
Natural monuments of regional importance in the district include the floodplain of the Maly Cheremshan River and the Tatarsko-Akhmetyevskoe peat bog. These monuments are home to protected plant species listed in the Red Book of Tatarstan such as the betula humilis, pyrola chlorantha, epipactis palustris, cirsium palustre, marsh dremlik, marsh thistle and others.

== Social Resources and Cultural Sector ==
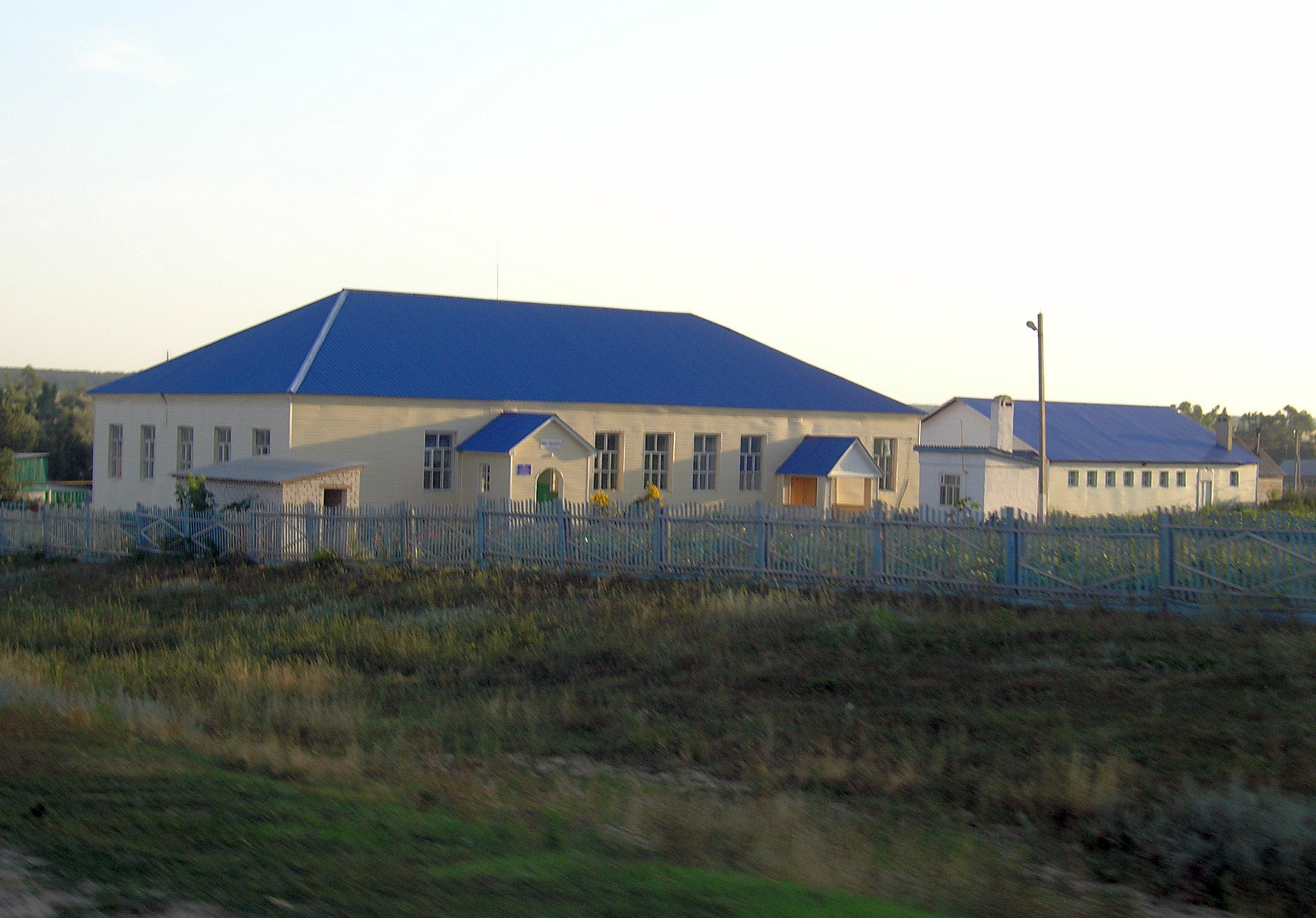
Educational building in the village of Appakovo

There are 33 educational institutions, 40 kindergartens and three institutions of supplementary education in the district including the House of Children's Art, a children's music school, and a children's and youth sports school. The district is also home to 36 libraries and two museums, the "History and Local Lore Museum named after Sergei Mikhailovich Lisenkov" in the village of Bazarnye Mataki and the Museum of the People's Poet of Chuvashia Pyotr Petrovich Khuzangai in the village of Sikterme-Khuzangaevo. The multidenominational population of the district is served by 30 Muslim and 5 Orthodox parishes. A local newspaper "Alkeevskie Vesti" ("Әlki hәbәrlәre") has been published in Tatar and Russian languages since 1932.

== External sources ==
- Official website of the district
