= Attar (name) =

Attar (Arabic: عطار, ʿAṭṭār), or Al-Attar, is both a given name and a surname of Arabic origins, that refers to the occupations apothecary, pharmacist, spice dealer, or perfumer.

There is an exaggerated form related to this name, Atir or Ater (Arabic: عاطِر, romanized: 'āṭir), meaning "perfumed, sweet-smelling, aromatic, fragrant", which is used rarely. Both of these names are derived from the Arabic noun for perfume or fragrance, attar (or ittar).

== People with the given name Attar ==
- Attar Chand Basha, Indian politician
- Attar of Nishapur (c.1142–c.1220), Persian Sufi poet
- Attar Singh, Fijian trade unionist of Indian descent
- Attar Singh Saini, Indian cinematographer

== People with the surname Attar ==
Notable people with the name include:

- Abbas Attar (1944–2018), Iranian photographer and photojournalist known by the mononym Abbas
- Abolfazl Attar (born 1968), Iranian film director
- Ahmad Abd al-Ghafur Attar (1916–1991), Saudi Arabian writer and journalist
- Ali Attar (born 1980), Lebanese footballer
- Asil Attar, Iraqi businesswoman
- Audie Attar (born 1980) is an Iraqi-American sports manager
- Bachir Attar (born 1964), leader of The Master Musicians of Jajouka
- Chaim Ben Attar, 18th century Moroccan rabbi
- Chaim ibn Attar (c. 1696–1743), Moroccan rabbi
- Dalya Attar (born 1990), American politician
- Jay Attar, American real estate developer
- Lior Attar, Australian singer-songwriter
- Muhammad Ilyas Attar Qadri (born 1950), Muslim scholar and spiritual leader
- Nelly Attar (born 1990), Lebanese mountaineer, of Saudi heritage
- Sarah Attar (born 1992), American track and field athlete, of Saudi heritage
- Sayyid Alauddin Attar, Sufi saint and shaykh
- Sibille Attar (born 1981), Swedish singer songwriter
- Zayn-e-Attar (c. 1329–1403), Persian physician

== People with the surname Al-Attar ==
- Abdullah Al-Attar (born 1992), Jordanian footballer
- Hasan al-Attar (1766–1835), Egyptian scholar
- Issam al-Attar (1927–2024), Syrian dissident politician and Islamic preacher
- Layla Al-Attar (1944–1993), Iraqi artist and painter
- Majdi Al-Attar (born 1995), Jordanian footballer
- Mohammad Al Attar (born 1980), Syrian playwright
- Muhammad Said al-Attar (1927–2005), Yemeni politician and diplomat
- Najah al-Attar (born 1933), Syrian politician
- Qahtan al-Attar (born 1950, né Qahtan Salih Mahdi al-Kinani), Iraqi singer, songwriter
- Samar al-'Aṭṭār (born 1945), Syrian writer
- Suad al-Attar (born 1942), Iraqi painter

== See also ==
- Attar (disambiguation)
- Atar (disambiguation)
