= Attar (disambiguation) =

Attar or Attoor (Arabic: عطار) is an essential oil or perfume. Attar or Attoor may also refer to:

== Places ==
- Attar railway station, in Madhya Pradesh, India
- Istgah-e Attar, or Attar, a village in Razavi Khorasan Province, Iran
- Attoor (Kanya Kumari), Tamil Nadu, India
  - Nizhal Thangal, Attoor, a Hindu (Ayyavazhi) temple in Attoor, Kanya Kumari
- Attoor (Kerala), India

== People ==
- Attar (name), an Arabic given name and surname, including a list of people with the name
  - Attar of Nishapur, 12th-century Persian poet

== Other uses ==
- Attar (caste), a Muslim community in India
- Attar (syrup), a type of sweet syrup
- ʿAṯtar, an ancient Semitic god
- Colonel Attar, a fictional character in Planet of the Apes

== See also ==
- Atar (disambiguation)
- Atta (disambiguation)
- Athar (disambiguation)
- Atari (disambiguation)
- Al Attar Tower (disambiguation)
- Attari, a town in Punjab, India
  - Attari (Assembly Constituency)
  - Attari–Wagah border ceremony, a military ceremony on the India-Pakistan border
- Attarwala, a community of perfume makers in India
- Attar of roses, rose oil
