= Ben-Atar =

Ben-Atar, Ben Atar, or Ben Attar (Hebrew: בן עטר) may refer to:

- Doron Ben-Atar
- Haim Ben Atar or Chaim ibn Attar
- Chaim Ben Attar (the elder)
- Maimon Ben-Atar (1867–1958), rabbi and educator in Alexandria, Egypt
- Moses Ben Attar
- Shai Ben-Atar (born 1979), Israeli TV film director and screenwriter

== See also ==
- Benatar
- Atar (name)
