= Atma =

Atma or ATMA may refer to:

- Atma (album), a 2011 album by heavy metal band Yob
- ATMA (electronic musician), the performance name of Romanian psytrance artist Andrei Oliver Brasovean
- Atma, İliç, Turkey
- Atma, Kemah, Turkey
- Atma (tribe), a Kurdish tribe from Turkey
- ATMA Classique, a Canadian record label
- Atma Weapon, a mythical being of pure energy in the video game Final Fantasy VI
- Atme, a village in northern Syria whose name is alternately spelled Atma
- An alternative spelling of Atman, the soul or self in Indian religions
- Atma, a character in the video game Diablo II
- A fictional virus in the Shin Megami Tensei: Digital Devil Saga series

== See also ==
- Atman (disambiguation)
