= Atman =

Atman or Ātman may refer to:

== Religion ==
- Ātman (Hinduism), meaning "Self", a philosophical concept common to all schools of Hindu philosophy
- Ātman (Buddhism), attā or attan, a reference to the essential self
  - Anattā or anātman — "not-self", central concept in Buddhism
- Ātman (Jainism), or Jīva, a philosophical term used within Jainism to identify the soul
- Atman jnana — "knowledge" in the context of Indian philosophy and religions

== Film ==
- Ātman (1975 film), a Japanese experimental short film directed by Toshio Matsumoto
- Atman (1997 film), a documentary film directed by Pirjo Honkasalo

== People ==
- Atman (surname)

== See also ==
- Atman Federation
- Atman Foundation
- Ataman, a title of Cossack and haidamak leaders of various kinds
- Atma (disambiguation)
- Atta (disambiguation)
- Divine soul (disambiguation)
- World Soul (disambiguation)
