= World Soul =

World Soul may refer to:

- Anima mundi, the "world-soul" in Plato and derived traditions in Western philosophy
  - Weltseele "world-soul" in German philosophy, see Weltgeist ("world-spirit")
  - Atman (disambiguation), a Sanskrit term sometimes equated with anima mundi
- World Soul (novel), a 1964 novel by Mikhail Yemtsev and Yeremey Parnov
