= Tatar Americans =

Америка Татарлары Amerika Tatarları أمريكا تاتارلار (Tatar)

Total population
- 11,000

Regions with significant populations
- New York, California

Languages
- American English · Tatar · Russian

Religion
- Majority Sunni Islam

Related ethnic groups
- Tatar Canadians, Tatar Australians

Tatar Americans (Tatar: Америка Татарлары / Amerika Tatarları / أمريكا تاتارلار) are Americans of full or partial Tatar ancestry. They originate became from Russia, but also come from other countries such as China, Turkey, Japan, Afghanistan and Australia.

According to the 2013 census, the Tatar population in the United States is estimated at up to 11,000. A significant number of Tatars live in cities such as New York, Los Angeles, San Francisco, Seattle and Chicago.

== Overview ==
Tatars in United States were arrived from Europe and Asia after World War II. However, the first Tatars began settling in the United States during the period of the Russian Revolution in 1917. A second group, consisting of Tatars who had fled to China during the revolutionary period, began arriving between 1925 and 1935. After World War II, additional Tatars arrived, including former prisoners of war who had been held in Germany. In 1950 a group of Tatars who had previously emigrated to China, Japan and Turkey, was settled in New York. Another wave followed after the Chinese Revolution of 1949, when Tatars fled the newly established People's Republic of China.

On March 15, 1927, the Moslem Unity Association (Tatar: Amerika Islam Cämğıyate / أمريكا يﺱلام جامعئياﻁئ) was established as one of the earliest organized Muslim institutions in the United States. Its founders included Niyaz Maksudov, Abdullah Atlas, Zagidulla Agishev, Rashid Khusainov, Akhtyam Suleimanov, and Ali Wilson. Although the leadership was predominantly Tatar, the organization also included other Turkic and Muslim immigrants, such as Turkmens, Azerbaijanis, Kazakhs, Kyrgyz, Kabardians, Chechens, Adyghe, Karachays, and Crimean Tatars. The organization was originally known as Muslim Unity (Tatar: Möselman Berlege / موﺱئلمان بئﺭلئگئ) and was renamed the Islamic Society of America in 1963.

In 1931, Tatar immigrants who had fled from Poland purchased a building constructed in 1885 at 104 Powers Street in Brooklyn, New York City, and converted it into a mosque, also known as the first mosque established in the city. For many years, it remained the only mosque in New York City. Its importance gradually declined in the postwar period as many Tatars and other early immigrants from the Russian Empire relocated to suburban areas. The building is now inactive as a mosque but remains a significant cultural landmark and is frequently referenced in studies on early Muslim communities in New York City and the history of Islam in the United States.

During the 1950s, the Association of American Tatars was established on the basis of the earlier Tatar Society of the United States (in early 60s the same organizaion was created in Burlingame, California). The association focused primarily on cultural and educational activities. In the postwar decades, particularly during the 1960s and 1970s, many prominent Tatar musicians, scholars, chess players, and other intellectuals became active within the organization.

In 1963, émigrés Niyaz Maksudi and Shigab Nigmati founded the Tatar-Bashkir Service of Radio Liberty, also known as Radio Azatlyk (Tatar: Азатлык Радиосы, Azatlıq Radiosı), which continues to operate today.

In the early 1990s, following the dissolution of the Soviet Union and the political instability that followed, a new wave of Tatar emigration to the United States began. Unlike earlier émigré communities, many of these newer immigrants had limited proficiency in the Tatar language as a result of Soviet-era Russification policies. Religious knowledge was also often limited due to decades of state-sponsored atheism in the USSR. Because many were from mixed Tatar-Russian families, they were frequently associated with the broader Russian-speaking immigrant community and often settled in predominantly Russian-speaking areas of the United States, such as Brighton Beach in New York City and Sunny Isles Beach.
