= Benatar =

Benatar is a surname. Notable people with the surname include:

- David Benatar (born 1966), South African professor of philosophy
- Hélène Cazès-Benatar (1898–1979), Moroccan Jewish lawyer and human rights activist
- Pat Benatar (born 1953), American singer-songwriter
- Stephen Benatar (born 1937), English author

== See also ==
- Ben Atar
