= Atar (disambiguation) =

Atar is the Zoroastrian concept for "burning and unburning fire" and "visible and invisible fire".

Atar may also refer to:

== People ==
- Atar (name)

== Places ==
- Atar, Mauritania, a city
  - Atar Department, containing the city
  - Atar International Airport, serving the city
- Atar, Padang Ganting, a village in Indonesia

== Other uses ==
- Atar Roto Presse, a Genevan printing company
- ATAR, Australian Tertiary Admission Rank, for admission to Australian universities
- Atelier Technique Aéronautique de Rickenbach, producer of jet engines:
  - ATAR-23
  - SNECMA Atar Volant
  - SNECMA Atar, a French jet engine
- AT-AR, a type of Imperial Walker from the Star Wars fictional universe

== See also ==
- Advanced Tactical Airborne Reconnaissance System (ATARS)
- Attar (disambiguation)
- Atari (disambiguation)
