= Old Yishuv Court Museum =

Museum and synagogue in Jerusalem

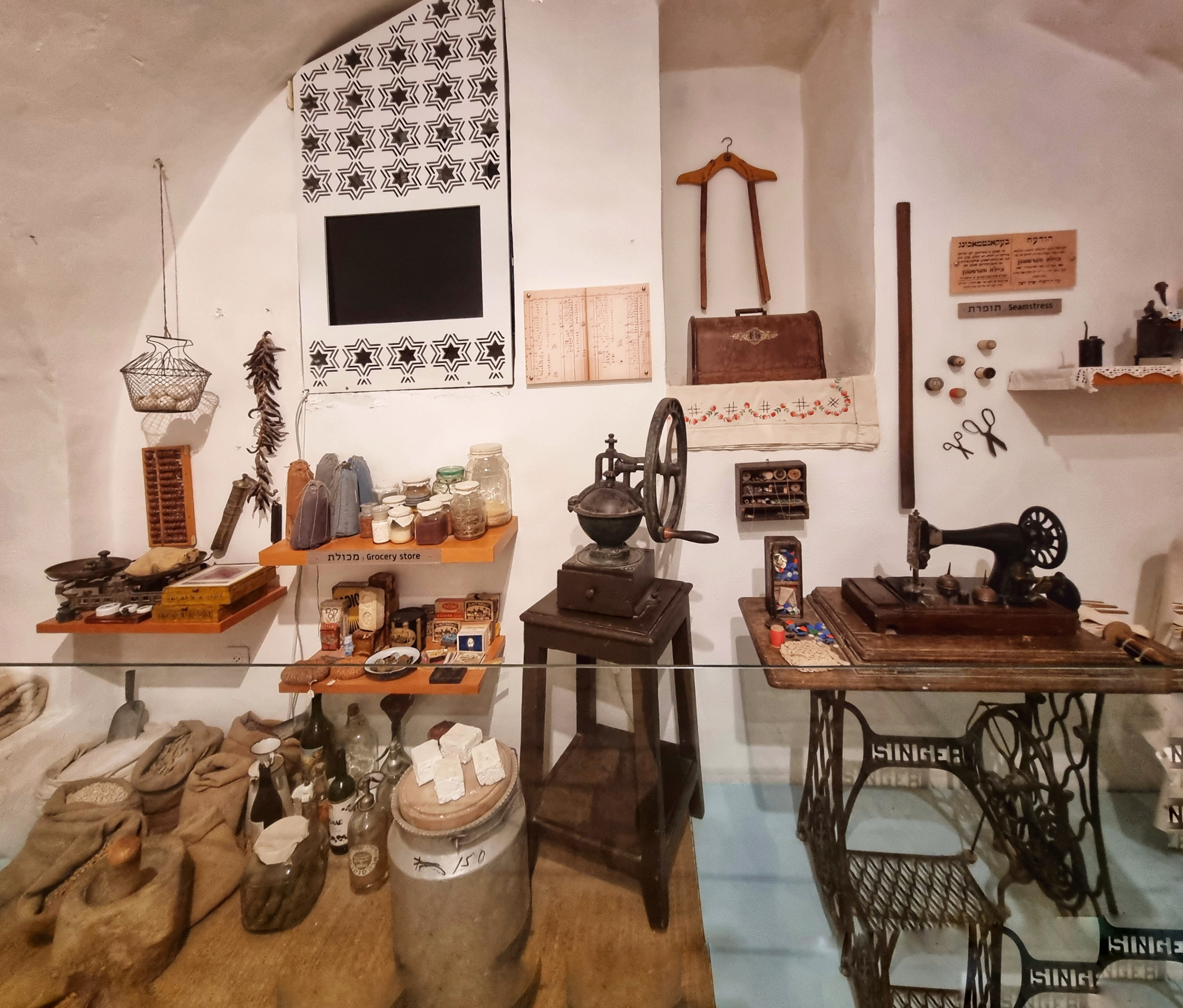
- The museum interior, in 2021
- Interactive fullscreen map
- Established: 1967
- Location: 6 Or HaChaim Street, Jewish Quarter, Jerusalem
- Coordinates: 31°46′31.1″N 35°13′49.0″E
- Type: Ethnographic museum
- Website: www.oyc.co.il/en/

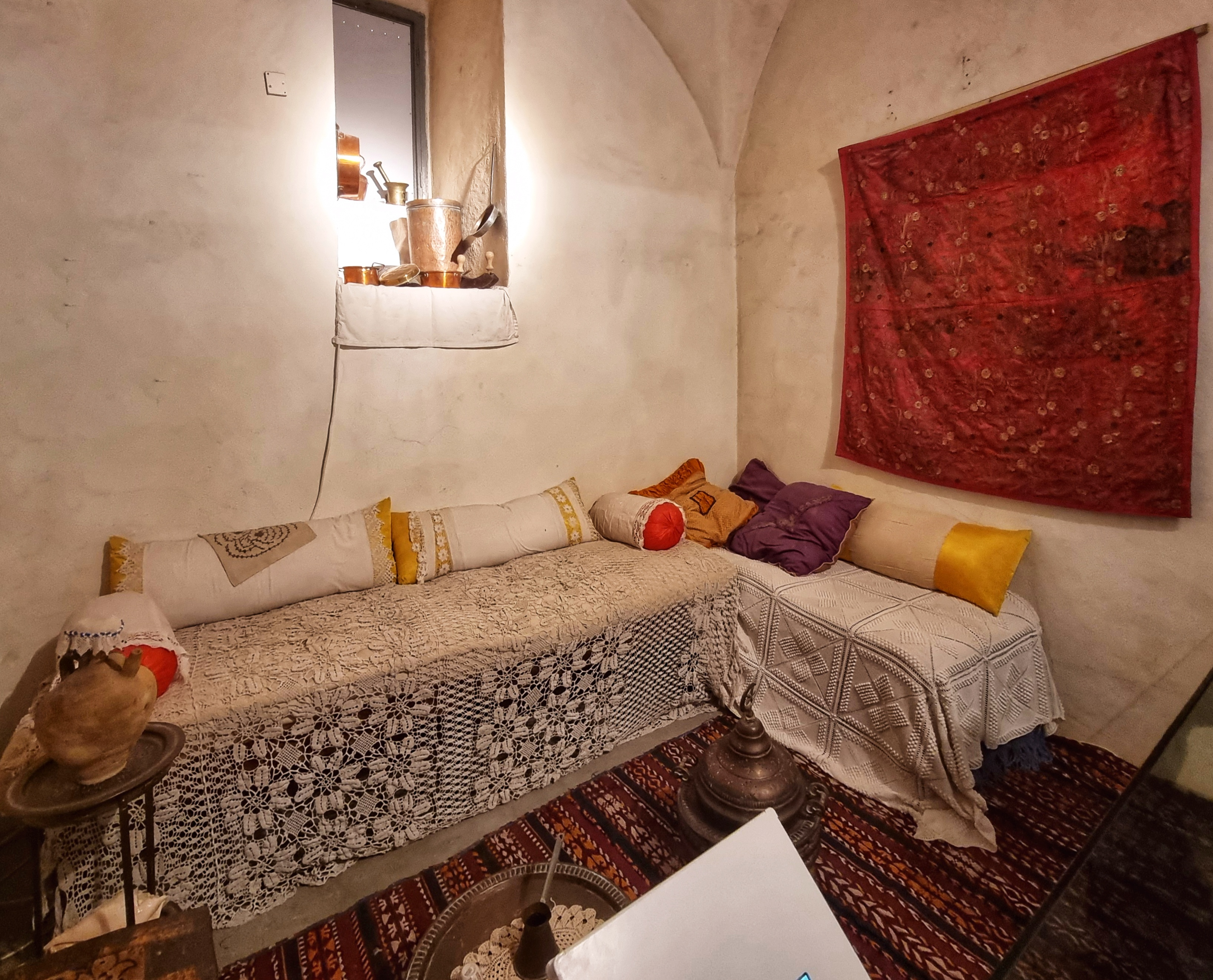
Sofa

The Old Yishuv Court Museum (Hebrew: מוזיאון חצר היישוב הישן, romanized: Muzeon Chatzer HaYishuv HaYashan) is an ethnographic museum on Or HaHaim Street in the Jewish Quarter of the Old City of Jerusalem. It showcases the traditional lifestyle of the Jewish Old Yishuv community during the late Ottoman and Mandatory periods, leading up to the fall of the Jewish Quarter to the Jordanian army in the 1948 Palestine war.

The museum complex includes the Ari Synagogue, an old Sephardic synagogue associated with and named after 16th century kabbalist, Rabbi Isaac Luria. Another part of the complex, on the second floor, houses the Ohr ha-Chaim Synagogue, which was formerly used by the Italian and Sephardic communities and now follows Ashkenazi nusach, though it is not part of the museum and has a separate entrance.

== Museum ==
The Old Yishuv Court Museum showcases the history of the Jewish community in Jerusalem from the mid-19th century to the Mandatory period. Located in one of the oldest and most well-known courtyards in the Jewish Quarter, it was home to the families of F"h and Rosental, early pupils of Vilna Gaon, for five generations after their arrival in the 19th century. During the Mandatory period, Rabbi A. Mordechai Weingarten's family lived there until the fall of the Jewish Quarter to the Arab Legion in the 1948 Arab-Israeli War. After Jerusalem's reunification, the Weingarten family returned.

Rebuilt and adapted into a museum after the Six-Day War, the museum depicts daily life, customs, and typical works of the Old Yishuv, with many items collected from veteran Jerusalemite families or purchased from collectors and shops.

The house is built in the typical style of past generations in the Jewish Quarter. Exhibits include two rooms displaying different hosting styles, Sephardic and Ashkenazi. In the bedroom, there is a birthing bed that was passed from house to house for women about to give birth. The kitchen features baking and cooking areas with many items, and the courtyards display water holes, a manual pump, gutters, ornamental plants, a laundry corner, and a warehouse. The craft room presents professions and trades from the past, such as a goldsmith, shoemaker, tailor, peddler, wool breaker, knife sharpener, and shoe shiner.

== Ari Synagogue ==
Ari Synagogue
- Hebrew: בית הכנסת הארי
- Interior of the synagogue, in 2002

- Location of the synagogue in the Old City of Jerusalem

Religion
- Affiliation: Judaism
- Ecclesiastical or organisational status: Synagogue
- Status: Active

Location
- Location: Above the Old Yishuv Court Museum
- Coordinates: 31°46′31.1″N 35°13′49.0″E

Architecture
- Type: Synagogue architecture
- Style: Ottoman architecture

The Ari Synagogue (Hebrew: בית הכנסת הארי) is a Jewish congregation and synagogue, located on the ground floor of a building which also houses the Ohr ha-Chaim Synagogue and Old Yishuv Court Museum. It is named after Rabbi Isaac Luria, (1534–1572), who was known as the Ari. (Note: Ari: (Hebrew: אֲרִי; trans: The Lion), an acronym for haEloqi Rabbeinu Yitzhak, the divine, our teacher, Isaac.) Luria was a great kabbalist who founded a new school in Kabbalistic thought, known as the "System of the Ari" or "Lurianic kabbalah".

According to tradition, it was in this building where Rabbi Isaac Luria was born and where he lived for 20 years. It is told that prophet Elijah was the sandek at his Brit milah. At some stage, the room of his traditional birthplace became a Sephardic synagogue. The Jews of the yishuv were forbidden by Ottoman Law to establish any new synagogues. This led to inconspicuous prayer houses which, like the Ari Synagogue, were located in residential homes. During the riots of 1936 the synagogue was looted and burned.

== See also ==
- History of the Jews in Israel
- List of synagogues in Israel
- List of Israeli museums
- Synagogues of Jerusalem
- Oldest synagogues in the world
