= Parnov =

Parnov (masculine, Russian: Парнов) or Parnova (feminine, Russian: Парнова) is a Russian surname. Notable people with the surname include:

- Liz Parnov (born 1994), Russian–born Australian athlete, sister of Vicky
- Vicky Parnov (born 1990), Russian–born Australian athlete, sister of Liz
- Yeremey Parnov (1935–2009), Soviet–Russian publicist and writer
