= Atta =

Atta or ATTA may refer to:

- Atta (ant), a genus of ants
- Atta (novel), a 1953 novel by Francis Rufus Bellamy
- Atta flour, whole wheat flour made from durum wheat commonly used in South Asian cooking
- Atta (Buddhism) or Ātman, Pali for "self" or "soul", central to the core Buddhist concept of Anatta, no-self
- Atta, Jalandhar, a village in India
- Átta, a 2023 album by Sigur Rós
- A group of Lumad peoples
- Princess Atta, a character from the Disney and Pixar film A Bug's Life
- Ata (name), people with the first name or family name, sometimes spelled Atta
  - Mohamed Atta (1968–2001), ringleader of the September 11 terrorist attacks.
- An abbreviation of American Turko-Tatar Association.

== See also ==
- ATA (disambiguation)
- Atman (disambiguation)
- Attar (disambiguation)
