= Atman (surname) =

Atman is a surname. Notable people with the surname include:

- Cynthia Atman (fl. 1979), American engineer
- Pavel Atman (born 1987), Russian handball player

== See also ==
- Atman (disambiguation)
