= USS Point Cruz =

Commencement Bay-class escort carrier of the US Navy

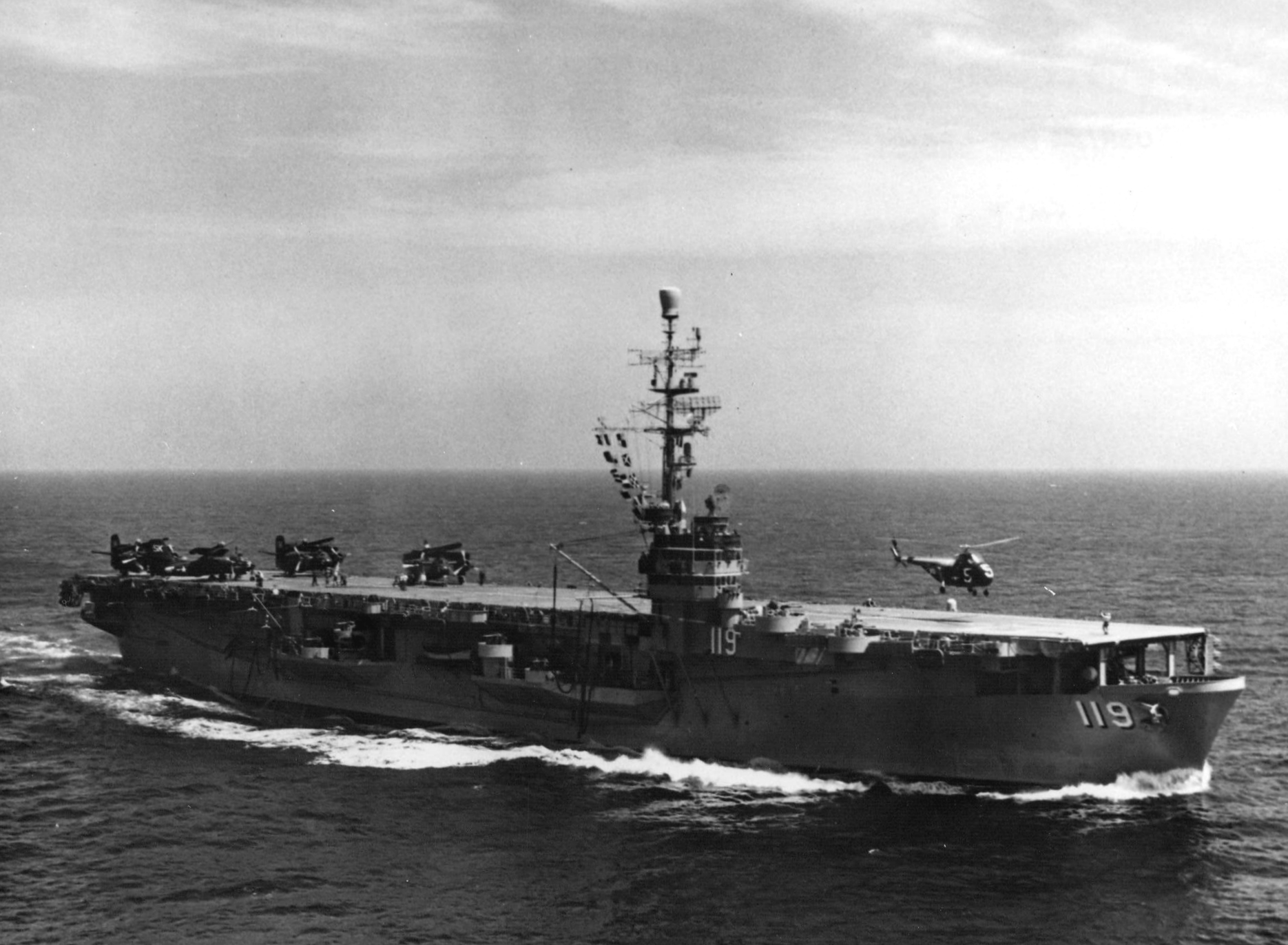
- USS Point Cruz (CVE-119), 25 June 1955

History

United States
- Name: USS Point Cruz
- Builder: Todd Pacific Shipyards
- Laid down: 4 December 1944
- Launched: 18 May 1945
- Commissioned: 16 October 1945
- Decommissioned: 30 June 1947
- Stricken: 15 September 1970
- Recommissioned: 26 July 1951
- Decommissioned: 31 August 1956
- Reclassified: Cargo Ship and Aircraft Ferry, AKV-19, 17 May 1957

General characteristics
- Class & type: Commencement Bay-class escort carrier
- Displacement: 21,397 long tons (21,740 t)
- Length: 557 ft 1 in (169.80 m) loa
- Beam: 75 ft (23 m)
- Draft: 32 ft (9.8 m)
- Installed power: 16,000 shp (12,000 kW); 4 × boilers
- Propulsion: 2 × Steam turbines; 2 × screw propellers
- Speed: 19 knots (35 km/h; 22 mph)
- Complement: 1,066
- Armament: 2 × 5 in (127 mm) dual-purpose guns; 36 × 40 mm (1.6 in) Bofors AA guns; 20 × 20 mm (0.8 in) Oerlikon AA guns
- Aircraft carried: 33
- Aviation facilities: 2 × aircraft catapults

USS Point Cruz was a Commencement Bay-class escort carrier of the United States Navy. The Commencement Bay class were built during World War II, and were an improvement over the earlier Sangamon class, which were converted from oil tankers. They were capable of carrying an air group of 33 planes and were armed with an anti-aircraft battery of 5 in (127 mm), 40 mm (1.6 in), and 20 mm (0.8 in) guns. The ships were capable of a top speed of 19 knots (35 km/h; 22 mph), and due to their origin as tankers, had extensive fuel storage.

Originally named Trocadero Bay until 5 June 1944 when it was renamed after the Honiara suburb Point Cruz, which was the site of heavy fighting during the Guadalcanal campaign. She was laid down on 4 December 1944 by Todd Pacific Shipyards Incorporated, Tacoma, Washington; launched on 18 May 1945, sponsored by Mrs. Earl R. DeLong; and commissioned on 16 October 1945.

== Design ==
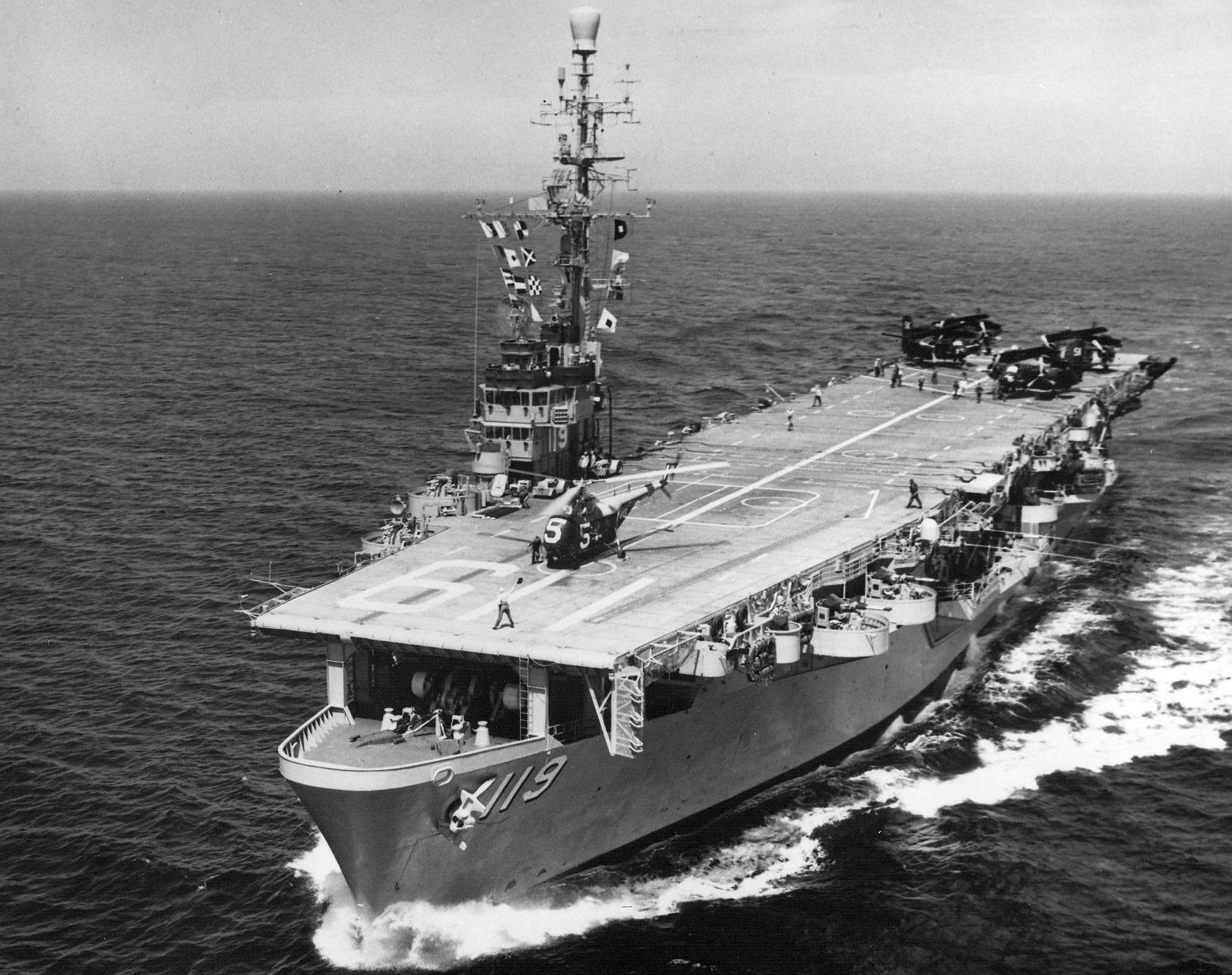
Point Cruz underway in 1955

In 1941, as United States participation in World War II became increasingly likely, the US Navy embarked on a construction program for escort carriers, which were converted from transport ships of various types. Many of the escort carrier types were converted from C3-type transports, but the Sangamon-class escort carriers were instead rebuilt oil tankers. These proved to be very successful ships, and the Commencement Bay class, authorized for Fiscal Year 1944, were an improved version of the Sangamon design. The new ships were faster, had improved aviation facilities, and had better internal compartmentation. They proved to be the most successful of the escort carriers, and the only class to be retained in active service after the war, since they were large enough to operate newer aircraft.

Point Cruz was 557 ft 1 in (169.80 m) long overall, with a beam of 75 ft (23 m) at the waterline, which extended to 105 ft 2 in (32.05 m) at maximum. She displaced 21,397 long tons (21,740 t) at full load, of which 12,876 long tons (13,083 t) could be fuel oil (though some of her storage tanks were converted to permanently store seawater for ballast), and at full load she had a draft of 27 ft 11 in (8.51 m). The ship's superstructure consisted of a small island. She had a complement of 1,066 officers and enlisted men.

The ship was powered by two Allis-Chalmers geared steam turbines, each driving one screw propeller, using steam provided by four Combustion Engineering-manufactured water-tube boilers. The propulsion system was rated to produce a total of 16,000 shp (12,000 kW) for a top speed of 19 knots (35 km/h; 22 mph). Given the very large storage capacity for oil, the ships of the Commencement Bay class could steam for some 23,900 nautical miles (44,300 km; 27,500 mi) at a speed of 15 knots (28 km/h; 17 mph).

Her defensive anti-aircraft armament consisted of two 5 in (127 mm) dual-purpose guns in single mounts, thirty-six 40 mm (2 in) Bofors guns, and twenty 20 mm (1 in) Oerlikon light AA cannons. The Bofors guns were placed in three quadruple and twelve twin mounts, while the Oerlikon guns were all mounted individually. She carried 33 planes, which could be launched from two aircraft catapults. Two elevators transferred aircraft from the hangar to the flight deck.

== Service history ==
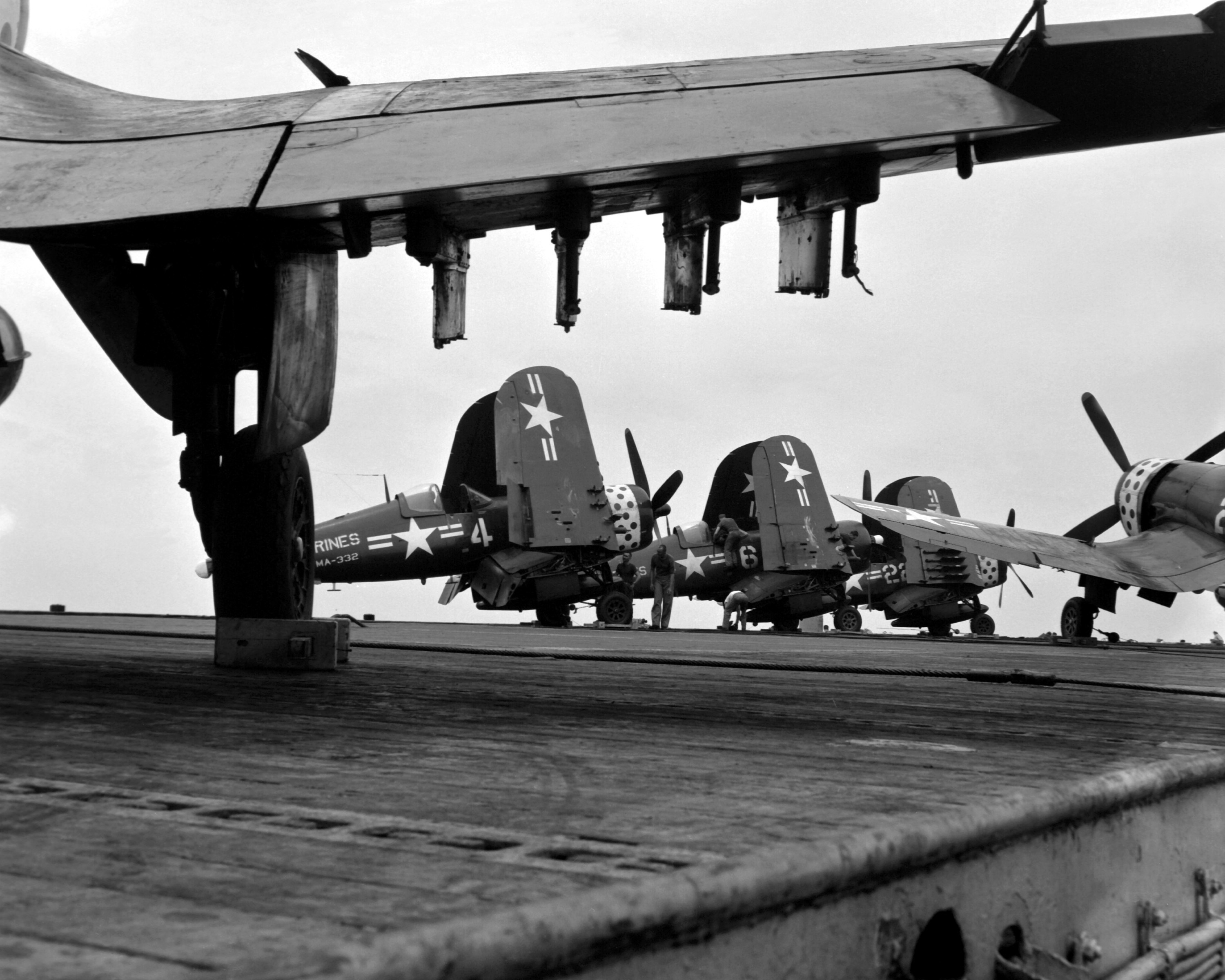
Corsairs aboard Point Cruz in July 1953 off Korea

The first fifteen ships of the Commencement Bay class were ordered on 23 January 1943, allocated to Fiscal Year 1944. The ship was laid down at the Todd Pacific Shipyards in Tacoma, Washington, originally under the name Trocadero Bay, on 4 December 1944. During construction, she was renamed Point Cruz, after a significant battle fought during the Guadalcanal campaign in November 1942. The completed hull was launched on 18 May 1945 and commissioned into active service on 16 October, after the end of World War II. The ship thereafter conducted acceptance sea trials, followed by a shakedown cruise. From October 1945 to March 1946, she carried out pilot qualification training off the West Coast of the United States. Point Cruz was then used to transfer aircraft to American military bases in the western Pacific over the next year. She returned to the Puget Sound Naval Shipyard on 3 March 1947, where she was mothballed and then decommissioned on 30 June. She was assigned to the Pacific Reserve Fleet, based in Bremerton, Washington.

The Korean War broke out in 1950, preparations were made to reactivate Point Cruz as part of wartime mobilization. She was recommissioned on 26 July 1951, and then underwent extensive modifications to convert the ship for helicopter operations. She got underway on 4 January 1953 for operations off the coast of Korea as part of an anti-submarine warfare hunter-killer group. During this period, she was based in Sasebo, Japan. During this period, she carried squadrons VMA-332, flying Vought F4U Corsair fighters and Grumman TBF Avenger anti-submarine patrol bombers, respectively. She patrolled the coast of Korea through early 1953, until the Korean Armistice Agreement ended hostilities in July. Point Cruz thereafter contributed her helicopters to an airlift effort to move Indian soldiers to Panmunjon to supervise the exchange of prisoners of war at the Joint Security Area.

Point Cruz arrived back in San Diego, California, in late December 1953. She took part in training exercises and then underwent an overhaul for periodic maintenance. On 24 August 1955, she got underway for another deployment to the western Pacific, serving as the flagship of Carrier Division 15, part of 7th Fleet. Her stay in the western Pacific was short, and on 31 January 1956, she left Yokosuka, Japan, to return home, arriving in Long Beach, California, in early February. From there, she returned to Puget Sound to be mothballed again. She was decommissioned on 31 August and allocated to the Bremerton Group of the Pacific Reserve Fleet. During this period, on 17 May 1957, she received the new hull number AKV-19. The Commencement Bay-class ships were no longer useful to the Navy, as they were to small to operate the latest generation of anti-submarine aircraft, which were much larger and heavier; instead, over the course of the mid-1950s, they replaced them with much larger Essex-class aircraft carriers. Proposals to radically rebuild the Commencement Bays either with an angled flight deck and various structural improvements or lengthen their hulls by 30 ft (9.1 m) and replace their propulsion machinery to increase speed came to nothing, as they were deemed to be too expensive.

On 23 August 1965, Point Cruz was recommissioned and transferred to the Military Sea Transportation Service, now using the hull number T-AKV-19. She was used as an aircraft transport in Southeast Asia, supporting American forces during the Vietnam War. The ship was eventually struck from the Naval Vessel Register on 15 September 1970.
