= Attar (caste) =

Muslim caste in Maharashtra and Andhra Pradesh, India

- Religions: Islam
- Country: India
- Original state: Maharashtra; Andhra Pradesh

The Attar are a Muslim community and caste found in the states of Maharashtra and Andhra Pradesh in India. This community has no connection with the Attarwala of Gujarat, other than both communities at one time having been involved in the manufacture of attars (perfumes).
