= Al Attar Tower =

Al Attar Tower can refer to a number of properties developed by the Al Attar Group including:

- Al Attar Business Tower, a Dubai office tower
- Khalid Al Attar Tower 2, a Dubai mixed-use skyscraper
- Ahmed Abdul Rahim Al Attar Tower, former name of the Gevora Hotel, a Dubai skyscraper hotel
