= VMFA(AW)-332 =

Marine All Weather Fighter Attack Squadron 332
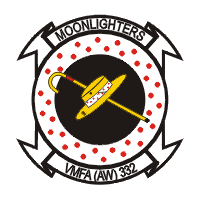
- VMFA(AW)-332 Insignia courtesy of www.military-graphics.com
- Active: 1 June 1943 – 30 March 2007
- Country: United States of America
- Branch: United States Marine Corps
- Type: Fighter/Attack
- Role: Close air support Air interdiction Aerial reconnaissance
- Part of: Inactive
- Nickname: Moonlighters
- Tail Code: EA
- Engagements: World War II; Operation Allied Force; Operation Iraqi Freedom

Aircraft flown
- Attack: Douglas AD-1 Skyraider; Douglas A4D Skyhawk; Grumman A-6 Intruder
- Bomber: Douglas SBD Dauntless; Grumman TBM Avenger
- Fighter: Grumman F6F Hellcat; Vought F4U Corsair; McDonnell-Douglas F/A-18D Hornet

VMFA(AW)-332 Marine All Weather Fighter Attack Squadron 332 was a United States Marine Corps F/A-18 Hornet squadron. Also known as the "Moonlighters", the squadron was based at Marine Corps Air Station Beaufort, South Carolina as part of Marine Aircraft Group 31 (MAG-31), 2nd Marine Aircraft Wing (2nd MAW). The squadron flew its last flight in the F/A-18 Hornet on 30 March 2007. At the time of their deactivation, they held the longest streak of mishap-free flight hours for a tactical jet squadron at 109,000 hours.

== Mission ==
Attack and destroy surface targets, day or night, under the weather; conduct multi-sensor imagery reconnaissance; provide supporting arms coordination; and intercept and destroy enemy aircraft under all weather conditions.

== History ==
=== World War II ===
Marine Scout Bomber Squadron 332 (VMSB-332) was commissioned on 1 August 1943 at the newly constructed Marine Corps Air Station Cherry Point, North Carolina. The squadron initially flew the Douglas SBD Dauntless dive bombers and regularly trained at Bogue Field while stationed in North Carolina. On 16 December 1943 the squadron received orders to prepare to move to the west coast of the United States beginning the first week of January 1944. In California, additional training took place at Marine Corps Air Station Mojave before departing for the Pacific Theatre during World War II. After a brief stay at Marine Corps Air Station Ewa, Hawaii, the squadron relocated to Midway Island. Its mission was to escort and provide air cover for all incoming and outgoing surface craft and submarines. In July 1944, the squadron relocated back to Ewa, where it would remain until after the war. On 1 March 1945, the squadron would make the first of four changes in squadron designations. Re-designated Marine Torpedo Bombing Squadron 332 (VMTB-332), the squadron transitioned to the TBM Avenger. After the war, 332 relocated to San Diego in November 1945 for deactivation.

=== 1950s ===
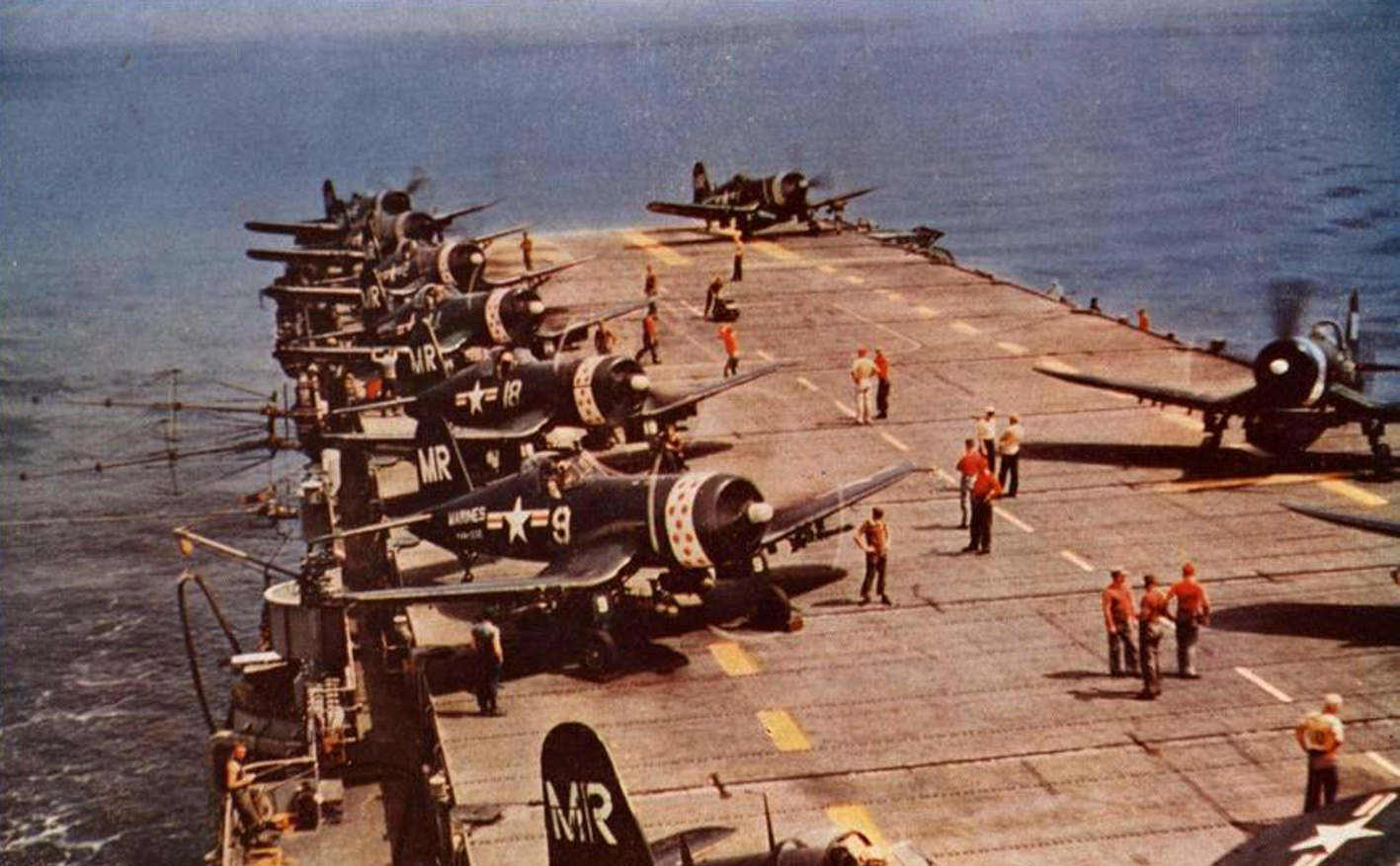
"Polka-dot" F4U-4s on USS Point Cruz in 1953.

Marine Attack Squadron 332 (VMA-332) was re-commissioned on 23 April 1952 as part of 3rd Marine Aircraft Wing at Marine Corps Air Station Miami, Florida flying the F6F Hellcat and later F4U Corsairs. During the Korean War, 332 was assigned a combat role operating from the USS Bairoko. It was at this time the famous polka-dots, hat, and cane originated. Replacing the VMF-312 "Checkerboards", who had a black and white checkerboard painted around the engine cowlings, VMA-332, somewhat mockingly, adopted the red polka-dots on white background. The design was reminiscent of Captain Eddie Rickenbacker's 94th Hat in the Ring Squadron of World War I. The addition of the hat and cane was derived from the squadron tail letters of "MR". Being the abbreviation of mister, and feeling they were gentlemen in every regard, the hat and cane was adopted as accouterments every gentleman has. It was then that the squadron picked up the nickname VMA-332 "Polka-dots". The squadrons last cruise of the war would be on board the USS Point Cruz (CVE-119) from April to December 1953. H Upon return from the war in 1953, VMA-332 transitioned to the AD-1 Skyraider. From 1953 to 1957, VMA-332 rotated annually between the East Coast and the Far East. In 1958, the squadron relocated back to MCAS Cherry Point, North Carolina, and entered the jet age transitioning to the venerable A4D Skyhawk and the tail letters were changed from "MR" to "EA".

=== 1960s - 1980s ===
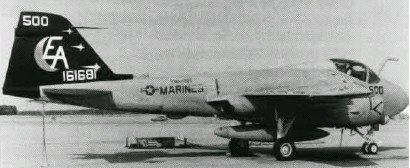
VMA(AW)-332 retired the last USMC A-6E Intruder in 1993.

VMA-332 continued its yearly rotation to Japan until 1962. In 1962, VMA-332 was the first Marine Corps squadron deployed to Udorn Royal Thai Air Force Base, Thailand, as part of a buildup of US forces in Thailand in response to the worsening situation of the Royal Lao Government in the Laotian Civil War. Later in 1962, the squadron would redeploy back home. It was during this time that the squadron's nickname was mysteriously changed to "Moonlighters". Although there are speculations, no written explanation exists for the change.

On 20 August 1968, the "Moonlighters" transitioned to the A-6 Intruder and was designated Marine All Weather Attack Squadron 332 (VMA(AW)-332). On 1 March 1975, the squadron received its first A-6E Intruder and in July 1982, they again upgraded to the A-6E TRAM (Target Recognition and Attack Multi-Sensor). VMA (aw) 332 was awarded Marine all weather attack squadron of the year in 1985.

=== 1990s ===
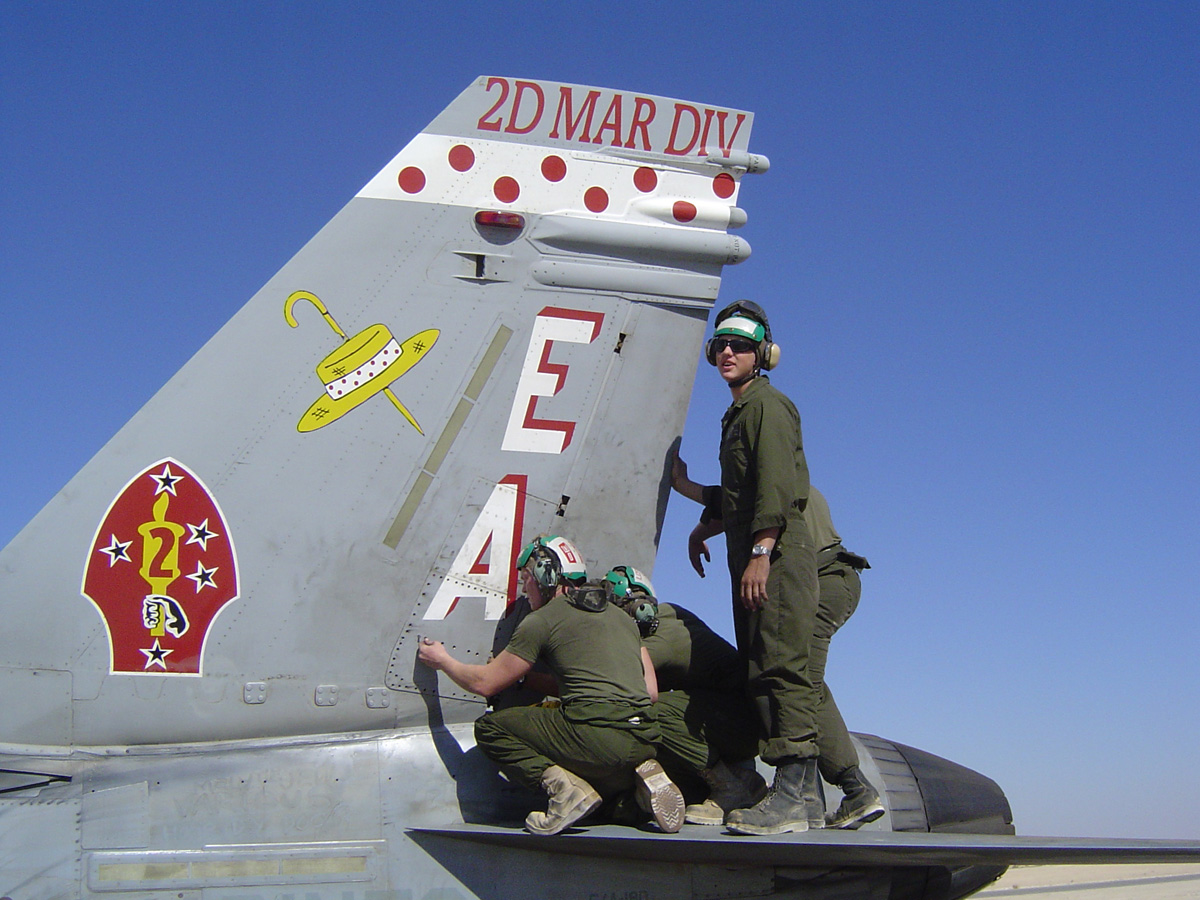
VMFA(AW)-332 polkadots, top hat and cane.

On 16 June 1993 the "Moonlighters" were redesignated Marine All Weather Fighter Attack Squadron 332 (VMFA(AW)-332), moved to MCAS Beaufort, South Carolina, and transitioned to the F/A-18D Hornet. Having to ramp up rapidly as a "new" squadron, the "Moonlighters" were called on to support NATO's Operation Deny Flight and Operation Provide Promise in the former Yugoslavian republic of Bosnia, deploying to Aviano Air Base, Italy from October 1994 to March 1995. During the deployment, the squadron led what was the largest NATO air strike to date against the Udbina Airfield as well as participating in several other strikes. The squadron deployed a second time to Aviano Air Base, Italy, in March 1996 in support of Operation Decisive Edge and Operation Joint Endeavor and returned home August of that year.

In May 1999, the squadron deployed to Taszar Air Base, Hungary in support of Operation Allied Force and Operation Joint Guardian. From 28 May to 7 June 1999, the "Moonlighters" flew 120 combat sorties over the Federal Republic of Yugoslavia, performing every type of mission required of an F/A-18D squadron during both day and night, expending 175,000 pounds of ordnance. VMFA(AW)-332 was, along with VMFA(AW)-533, one of the first deployable units flying appropriately configured Hornets for the Joint Direct Attack Munition (JDAM). After the bombing campaign ceased, the "Moonlighters" continued to fly contingency operations in support of NATO peacekeeping forces in Kosovo. During the deployment, the squadron utilized the Advanced Tactical Airborne Reconnaissance System (ATARS) operationally for the first time ever. The squadron returned to MCAS Beaufort in July 1999.

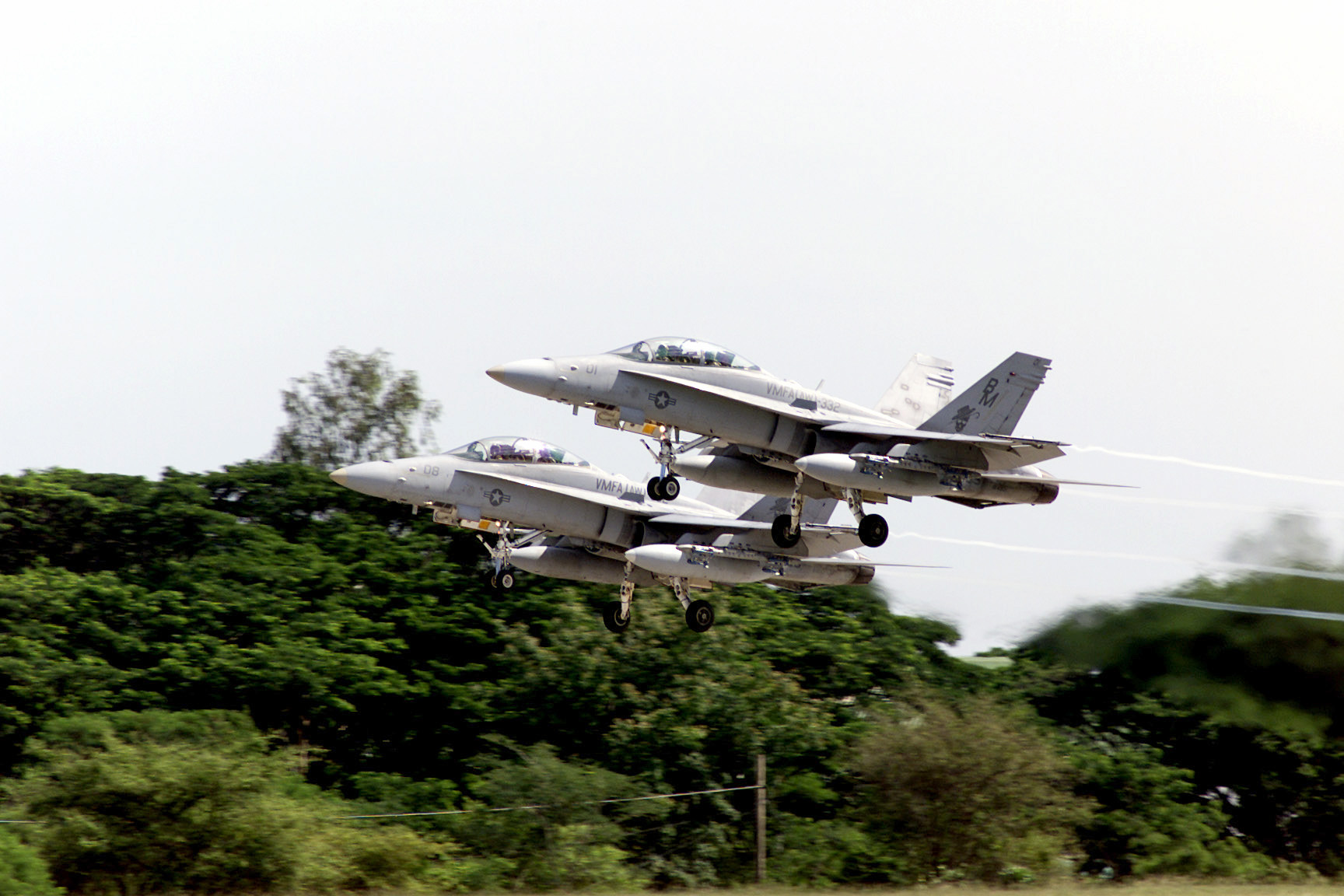
Two VMFA(AW)-332 Hornets take off from Korat, May 2000.

=== 2000s ===
In January 2000, VMFA(AW)-332 deployed to Marine Corps Air Station Iwakuni, Japan. The deployment would take the squadron to mainland Japan, Okinawa and Korat, Thailand. On 1 March 2000, the "Moonlighters" reached the milestone 81,000 mishap free flight hours, a safety record spanning 21 years.

=== Global War on Terror ===
The Moonlighters arrived at Andersen Air Force Base, Guam, on 11 January 2002 and took over Operation Noble Eagle, relieving VMFA-212 and VMFA-232. During the squadron’s tour in Guam, they flew 262 sorties and amassed 582.7 hours of flight time.

In January 2002, VMFA(AW)-332 joined the VMFA-212 to form two composite squadrons, providing the Lancers the capability of conducting ATARS reconnaissance missions and FAC(A) in support of Operation Enduring Freedom (OEF) and Operation Southern Watch (OSW). The squadrons exchanged four aircraft as well as aircrew and maintainers for this effort. During this deployment, the squadron deployed to Okinawa, the Philippines, Khorat and MCAS Iwakuni, and surpassed 90,000 mishap-free flight hours.

On 11 September 2003, they again returned to Japan to as part of the Unit Deployment Program. During this deployment, the squadron deployed to Dhaka, Bangladesh in support of Operation Sumo Tiger as well as to Thailand, Guam, and Townsville, Australia. On 26 May 2005, the "Moonlighters" reached the 100,000 mishap-free flight hour mark, recognizing 27 years of professionalism and safety. LtGen James Amos presented the squadron with the 100,000 award on 20 July 2005. This achievement represents the longest record of mishap-free flight of any tactical aviation squadron in Marine Corps history.

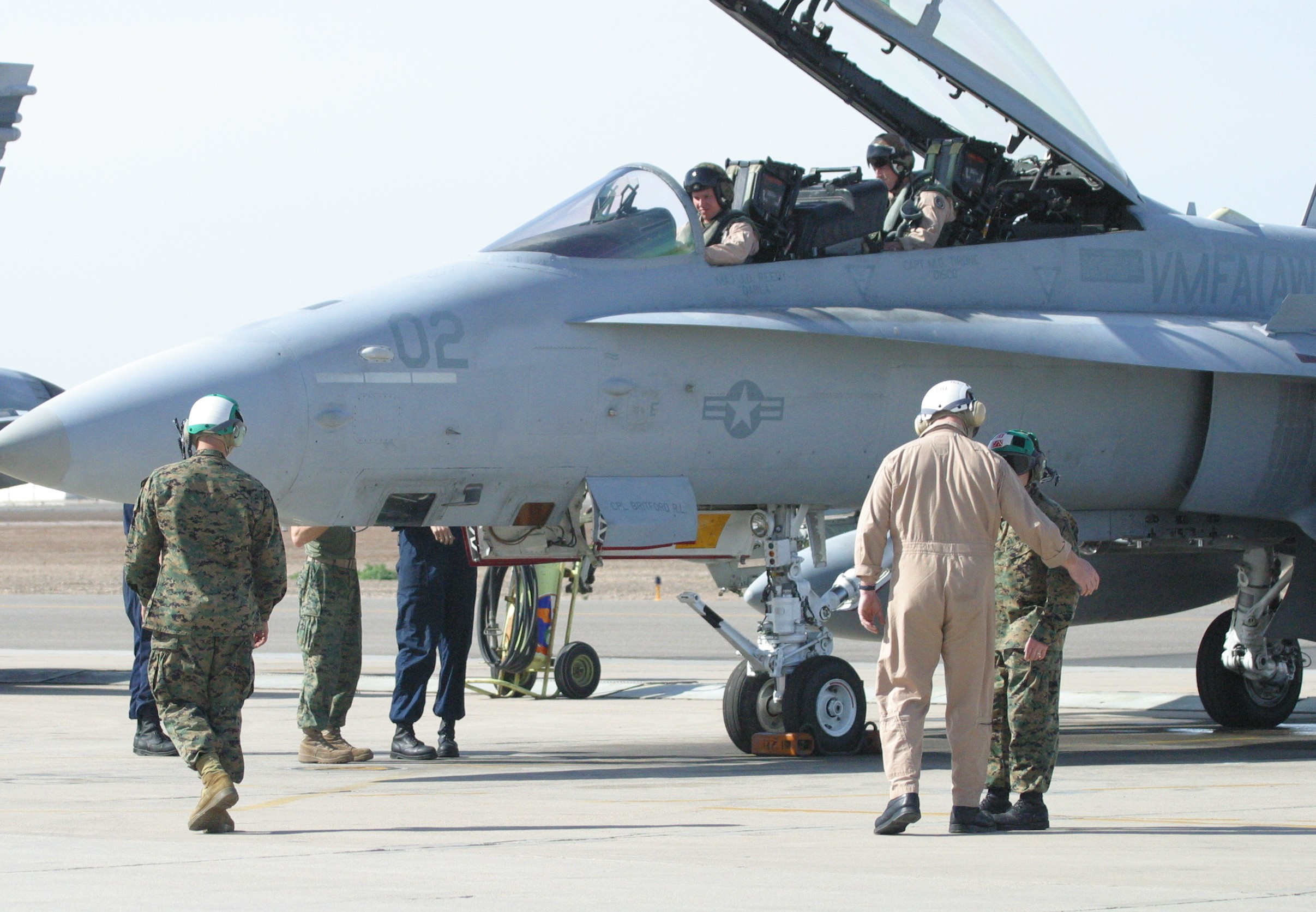
A VMFA(AW)-332 F/A-18D with ATARS in the nose of the aircraft.

On 26 July 2005, VMFA(AW)-332 departed MCAS Beaufort for its combat deployment in support of Operation Iraqi Freedom (OIF). 332 regularly flew a twelve-sortie Air Tasking Order cycle with intermittent surge days and ground alerts. Typical missions included close air support (CAS), Armed Reconnaissance (AR), Infrastructure Intelligence, Surveillance and Reconnaissance (ISR), Advanced Tactical Airborne Reconnaissance System (ATARS) and Convoy Escort. These missions were conducted on a daily basis, during both day and night, in support of Marine, Army, and various Joint Special Operations units. The most common tasking from these ground units required use of the LITENING Pod to identify, monitor, and report any activity in the vicinity of historical insurgent mortar and rocket Points of Origin (POO) sites. Most of these POO sites were in the vicinity of Forward Operating Bases (FOBs) and coalition airfields throughout Al Anbar province.

During just 7 months of combat operations, which included both the Iraqi Constitutional Referendum and National elections, the Moonlighters participated in such named Operations as Rivergate, Iron Fist, Steel Curtain, Blue Devil, Trifecta, Tigers, Skinner, Spiderweb and Liberty Express. During this deployment, the "Moonlighters" flew 2406 sorties for a total of 6031.9 hours. The squadron departed the Al Anbar province successfully on 11 February 2006 with another combat deployment of zero missed sorties. The total ordnance expended for the deployment was: 50 GBU-38s, 270 GBU-12s, 23 AGM-65s, 10 5" rockets, 2 GBU-16s, 6 GBU-32s, 16 LUU-19s and 7640 rounds of 20mm for a total of 160,966 lbs of ordnance. During the deployment they used the combat callsign of "Dealers."

In late 2006 the squadron began downsizing in preparation for the decommissioning of the squadron. Flight operations focused on preparing aircrew and Marines for follow on units. The squadron flew its last flight in the F/A-18 Hornet and was deactivated on March 30, 2007. The Moonlighters were named the 2006 Marine Corps Aviation Association Fighter/Attack Squadron of the Year and held the longest streak of mishap-free flight hours for a tactical jet squadron with a remarkable 109,000 hours.

== Popular culture ==
Revell GMBH distributed a 1:48 plastic model kit of a Korean era 1953 Corsair F4U-4 of VMA-332 "polka dots", ship No. 14, (modelled from the same photo used in this wiki above, the F4Us aboard the USS Point Cruz)

== Unit awards ==
- Asiatic Pacific Campaign Medal
- National Defense Service Medal with one Bronze Star
- Armed Forces Expeditionary Medal
- Navy Unit Commendation
- Kosovo NATO Medal
- Kosovo Campaign Medal

== See also ==
- United States Marine Corps Aviation
- List of active United States Marine Corps aircraft squadrons
- List of decommissioned United States Marine Corps aircraft squadrons
