= Mordechai Weingarten =

Jewish community leader in Jerusalem (1896–1964)

Mordechai Weingarten (Hebrew: מרדכי ויינגרטן; 1896–1964) was a Jewish community leader in Jerusalem during the British Mandate.

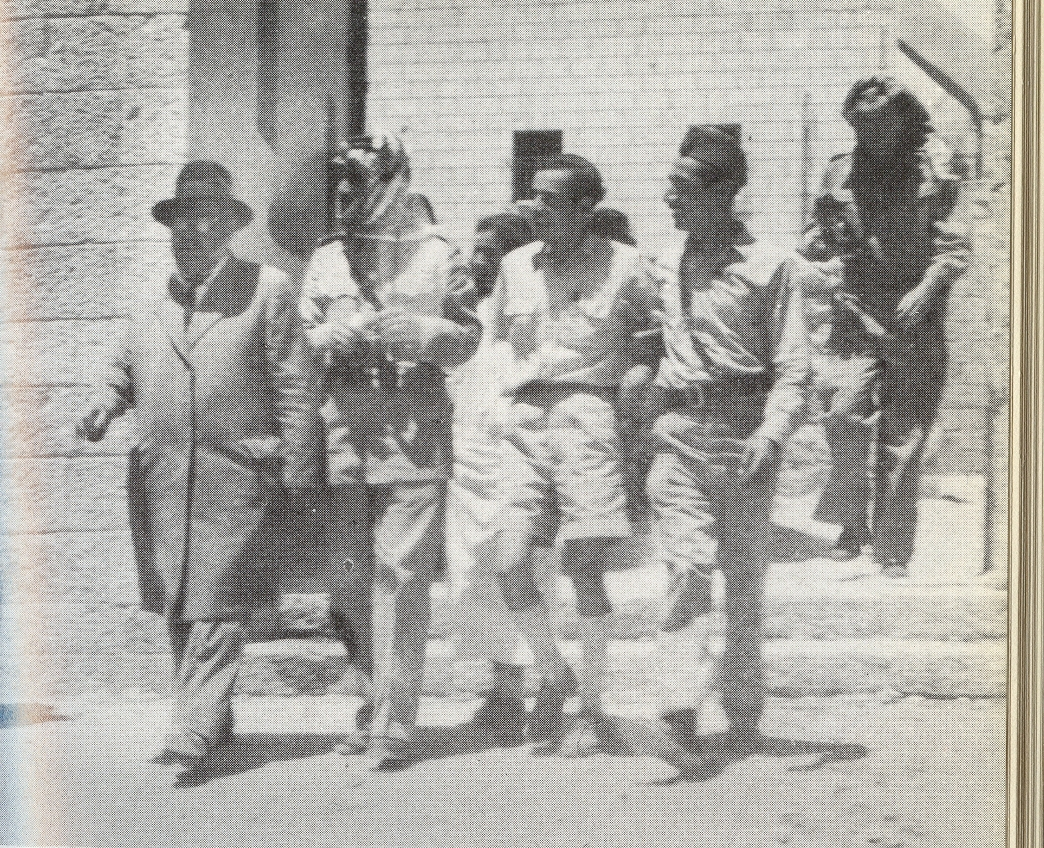
Mordechai Weingarten and Abdullah el Tell in Jerusalem, 28 May 1948

Mordechai Weingarten was born in the Old City of Jerusalem. His family had moved to the Old City in 1813 and lived in the courtyard of the Ohr ha-Chaim Synagogue, on the way to the Armenian Quarter, for five generations. In 1912, he married Esther Toibe Rosenthal (1898-1973), who had also been born in Jerusalem to a family which was long-established in the city. Her family had moved to Jerusalem from Lithuania in 1740 and were the first Ashkenazi Jews to settle in the Jewish Quarter. They had five daughters.

Weingarten was the mukhtar of the Jewish Quarter from 1935 to 1948. In this role, he was responsible for the distribution of funding from the Jewish Agency, which by 1948 amounted to £5,000 per month. He maintained an office in the New City and worked closely with the Agency and the Haganah. He provided written assurances to the British authorities that the Haganah commander in the Old City, Abraham Halperin, was a male nurse thus allowing him to take up his post in the Jewish Quarter. On several occasions the eldest of Weingarten's five daughters, Yehudit, was used to smuggle weapons into the Quarter some of which were stored in the family home.

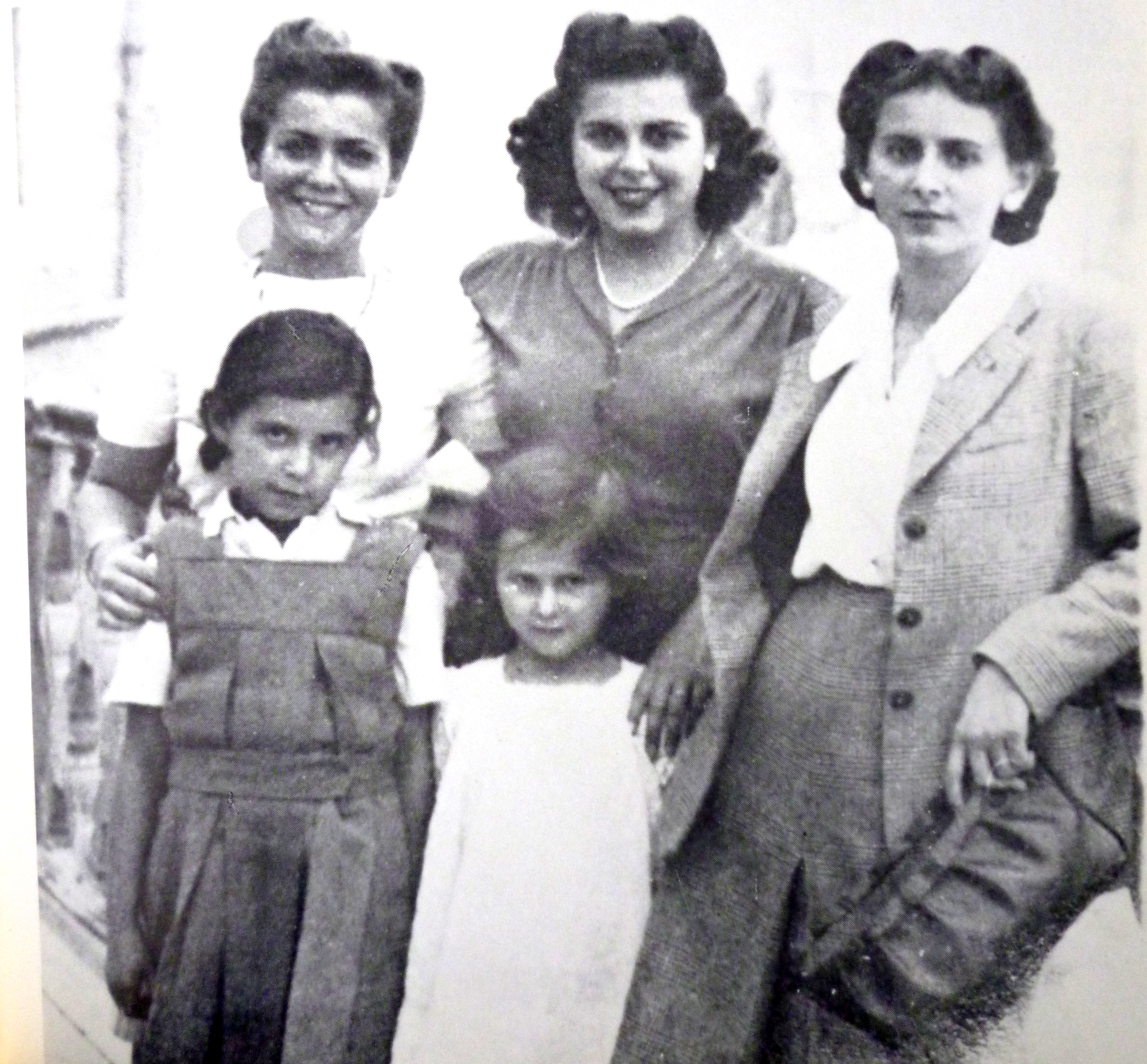
Weingarten's daughters in 1947.

As the situation deteriorated at the end of 1947, Weingarten advocated co-operation with the British authorities and opposed the Haganah's presence in the Old City. His relationship with the Jewish Agency broke down in February 1948, when the Haganah took charge of food distribution in the Jewish Quarter. Some weeks later Weingarten was apparently involved in the arrest by the British of Abraham Halperin, who was returned to the New City.

On May 13, 1948, as the British Army left Jerusalem, a major from the Suffolk Regiment presented Weingarten with the key for the Zion Gate. With the British soldiers' departure, Haganah forces began occupying parts of the Armenian Quarter. That night, after a long meeting with the Armenian Patriarch, Guregh II Israelian, Weingarten insisted that the Haganah withdraw, on condition that the Armenians prevented their properties being used for attacks on the Jewish Quarter.

Fifteen days later, on Friday May 28, with the Jewish Quarter completely cut off, Weingarten and a Haganah representative met Abdullah el Tell, the local commander of the Arab Legion, to discuss surrender terms. Under the surrender terms 'all men capable of bearing arms, were to be made prisoners of war. Weingarten 'succeeded in rescuing some fifty to sixty men' and insisted on accompanying the 340 POWs to Transjordan. The total number of Jews killed during the fighting for the Jewish Quarter was 39 combatants and 30 residents.

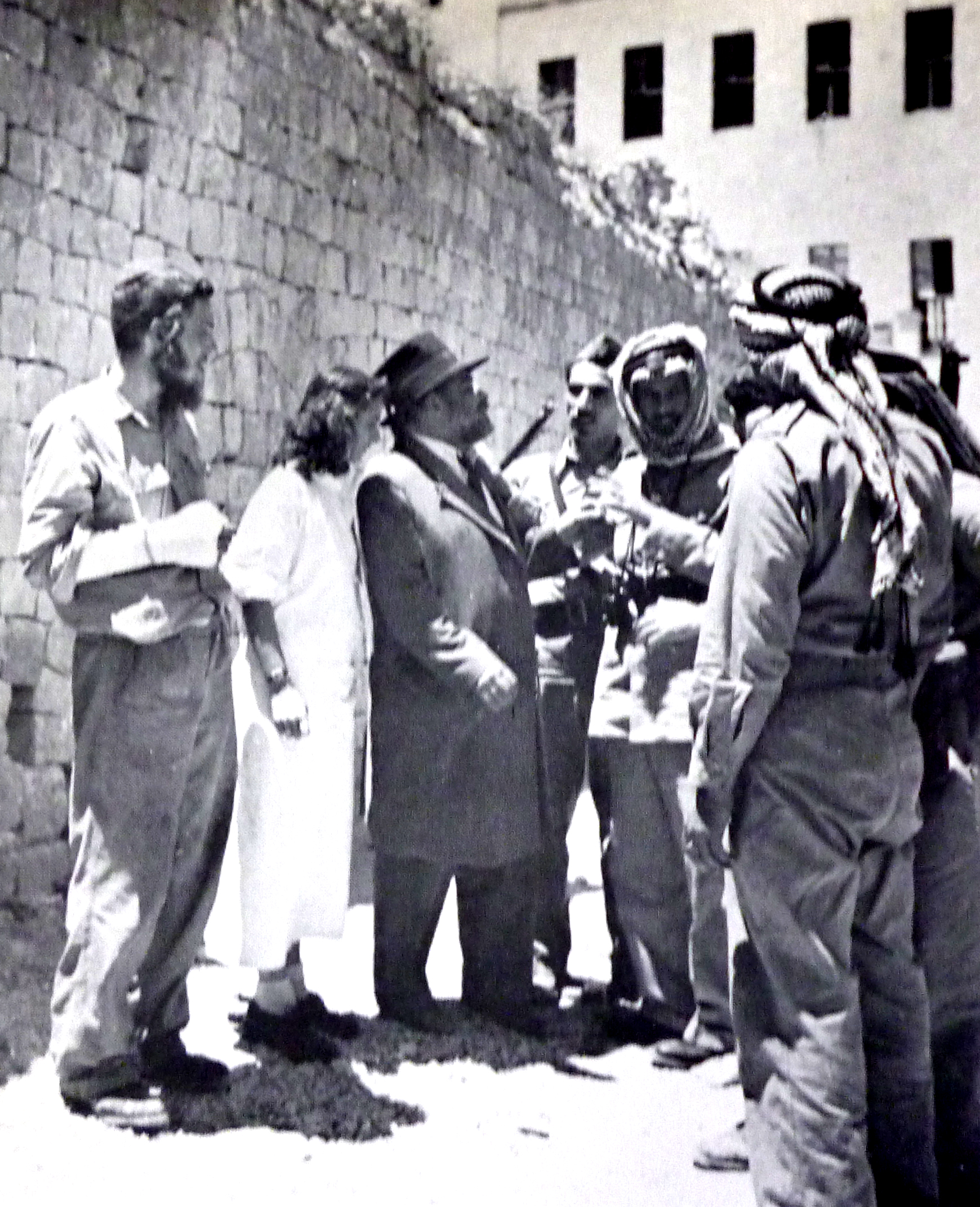
Weingarten and daughter Yehudit negotiating surrender in 1948

On his return to 'New Jerusalem' on June 7 he was put under house arrest. Despite this, on July 9, he was chosen to meet Abdullah el Tell, now the Jordanian Military Commander of the Old City, to discuss the release of the prisoners taken in the Jewish Quarter, the burial of bodies left in the Quarter, and the rescue of any Torah scrolls that had survived. On August 17 he appeared before a commission investigating events in the Old City. His evidence was critical of the Haganah's actions, describing "complete confusion during the last week of fighting, with no military effort to maintain contact with the civilians."

Weingarten died in 1964. After Israel captured the Old City during Six-Day War three years later, his family reclaimed his old home and established a museum there.
