= Mikhail Yemtsev =

Mikhail Tikhonovich Yemtsev
- Born: 1930 October 20; Kherson, Ukraine, USSR
- Died: 2003 August 25
- Writing career
- Genre: Science fiction
- Notable work: Dusha Mira (translated as World Soul)

Mikhail Yemtsev (Russian: Михаил Тихонович Емцев, June 3, 1930 – August 25, 2003) - Soviet and Russian science fiction writer who worked mostly in collaboration with Yeremey Parnov.

== Collaborative works with Yeremey Parnov ==
Collected stories

- Uravneniye s Blednogo Neptuna; English translation: The Pale Neptune Equation
- Padeniye sverkhnovoy
- Posledneye puteshestviye polkovnika Fosetta
- Zelyonaya krevetka
- Tri kvarka
- Yarmarka teney

Novels

- Dusha Mira; English translation: World Soul
- More Diraka
- Klochya tmy na igle vremeni
