= Tatar Canadians =

Канада татарлары

Total population
- 2,850 (by ancestry, 2011 census)

Regions with significant populations
- Ontario and Quebec

Languages
- Canadian English · Canadian French · Tatar · Russian

Religion
- Sunni Islam · Irreligion

Related ethnic groups
- Tatar Americans

Tatar Canadians are Canadian citizens of Tatar descent residing in Canada. According to the 2011 census, there were 2,850 Canadians who claimed Tatar ancestry. Most of them (1,245−2,000) live in Toronto, Ontario.

Every year, a group of Tatar activists organizes Sabantuy festival in Montreal, Toronto, and Calgary which brings together Tatars and Bashkirs and members of other Turkic diasporas from all over the country.

== Notable Tatar Canadians ==
- Daria Gaiazova, Canadian cross-country skier
