= Atar (name) =

Atar is both a given name and a surname. Notable people with the name include:

- Atar Arad (born 1945), Israeli-American violist
- Danny Atar, Israeli politician
- Eliran Atar (born 1987), Israeli footballer
- Reuven Atar (born 1969), Israeli footballer
- Roi Atar, Israeli footballer
- Tirtza Atar, Israeli poet

== See also ==
- Attar (name)
- Ben Atar
