= Moses Ben Attar =

Jewish merchant and diplomat

Moses Ben Attar was a Jewish merchant and diplomat from Salé, Morocco.

== Career ==
Born into a family in Salé which was known for rabbinic learning and business acumen. He served under Moulay Zaidan, Ismail's son, experiencing regular penalties. However, he gained prominence after receiving support from Lalla Zaidana, Moulay Zaidan's influential mother.

Moses Ben Attar held a diplomatic role under Sultan Moulay Ismail. Notwithstanding continuous fines and mistreatment, he was tasked with negotiating a peace treaty with Britain. His role as a diplomat was highlighted when he concluded a peace treaty with George I of Great Britain in 1721. Post this diplomatic success, Ben Attar was appointed Nagid of the Jews in the kingdom, replacing the late Abraham Maimran. However, his tenure as Nagid was cut short due to the Sultan's unpredictable anger, and he was narrowly saved from a sentence of being burnt, instead being fined once again.

Ben Attar's influence was remembered posthumously in diplomatic correspondences acknowledging his trade with European nations.
