= Advanced Tactical Airborne Reconnaissance System =

Reconnaissance system used in US Marine aircraft

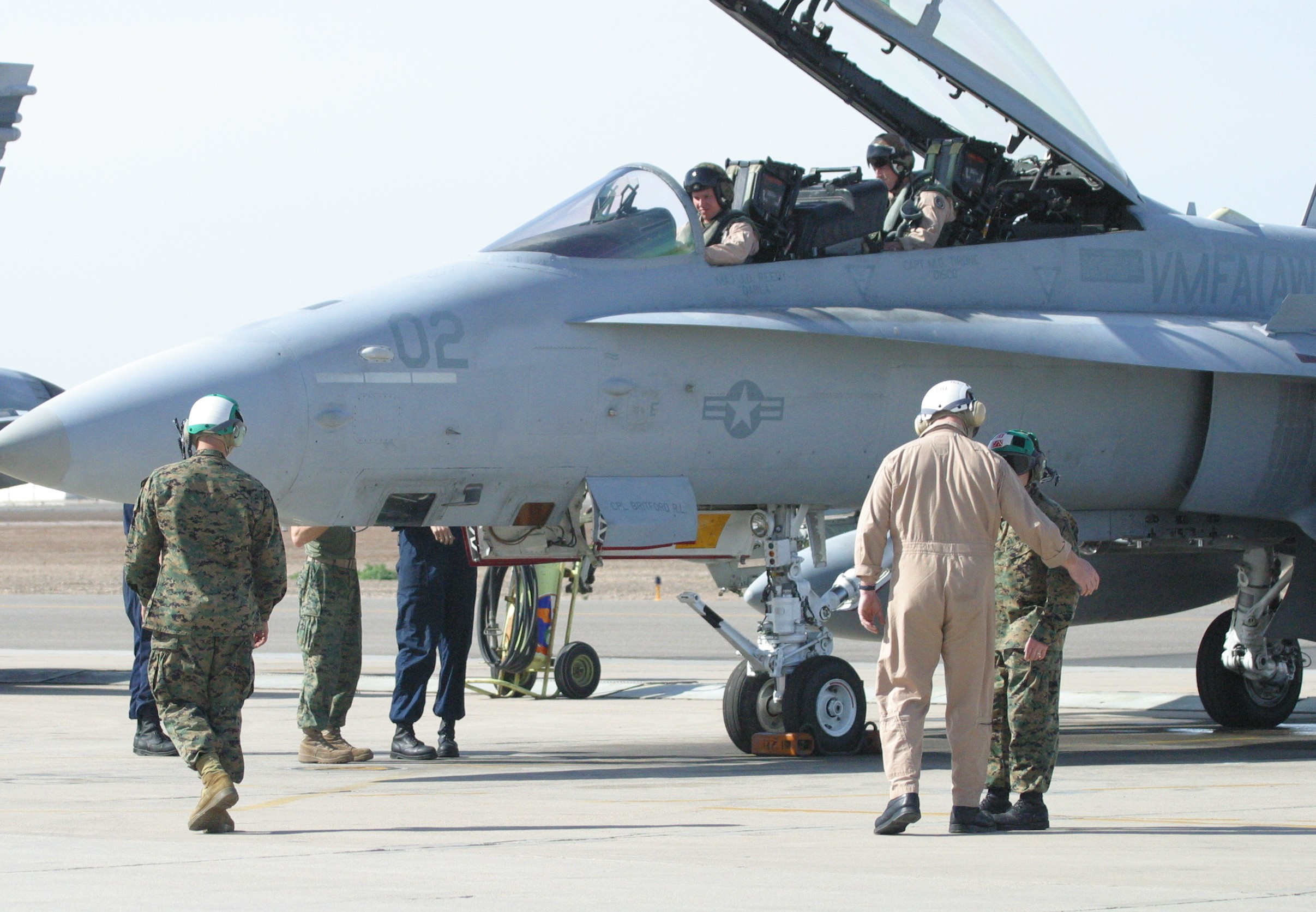
An F/A-18D from VMFA(AW)-332 with the ATARS system in the nose of the aircraft

Advanced Tactical Airborne Reconnaissance System (ATARS) is a system for image acquisition, data storage, and data link used by the United States Marine Corps on its F/A-18D Hornet aircraft. It consists of the Advanced Tactical Airborne Reconnaissance System (ATARS) with infrared and visible light sensors, two digital tape recorders, and a Reconnaissance Management System (RMS); an interface with the APG-73 Radar Upgrade (Phase II) which records synthetic aperture radar (SAR) imagery; and a digital data link mounted in a centerline pod. ATARS fits in the nose in place of the nose gun, with a small datalink pod mounted on the centerline station. The digital data link will transmit imagery and auxiliary data to any Common Imaging Ground/Surface Station (CIG/SS) compatible system including the Joint Services Imagery Processing System (JSIPS) or Marine Tactical Exploitation Group (TEG) based ashore and Navy JSIPS (JSIPS-N) aboard ship.

== Operational use ==
Each of the four U.S. Marine Corps F/A-18D squadrons have three ATARS aircraft, giving a total of 12 ATARS equipped aircraft altogether. The first operational use of ATARS equipped aircraft occurred in February 2000 when MCAS Beaufort based VMFA(AW)-332 deployed to Hungary in Operation Allied Force. ATARS is a considerable advance in capability on the Marines' old RF-4B/C aircraft.
