= Ohr ha-Chaim Synagogue =

Kabbalistic synagogue in Jerusalem

- Hebrew: בית הכנסת אור החיים
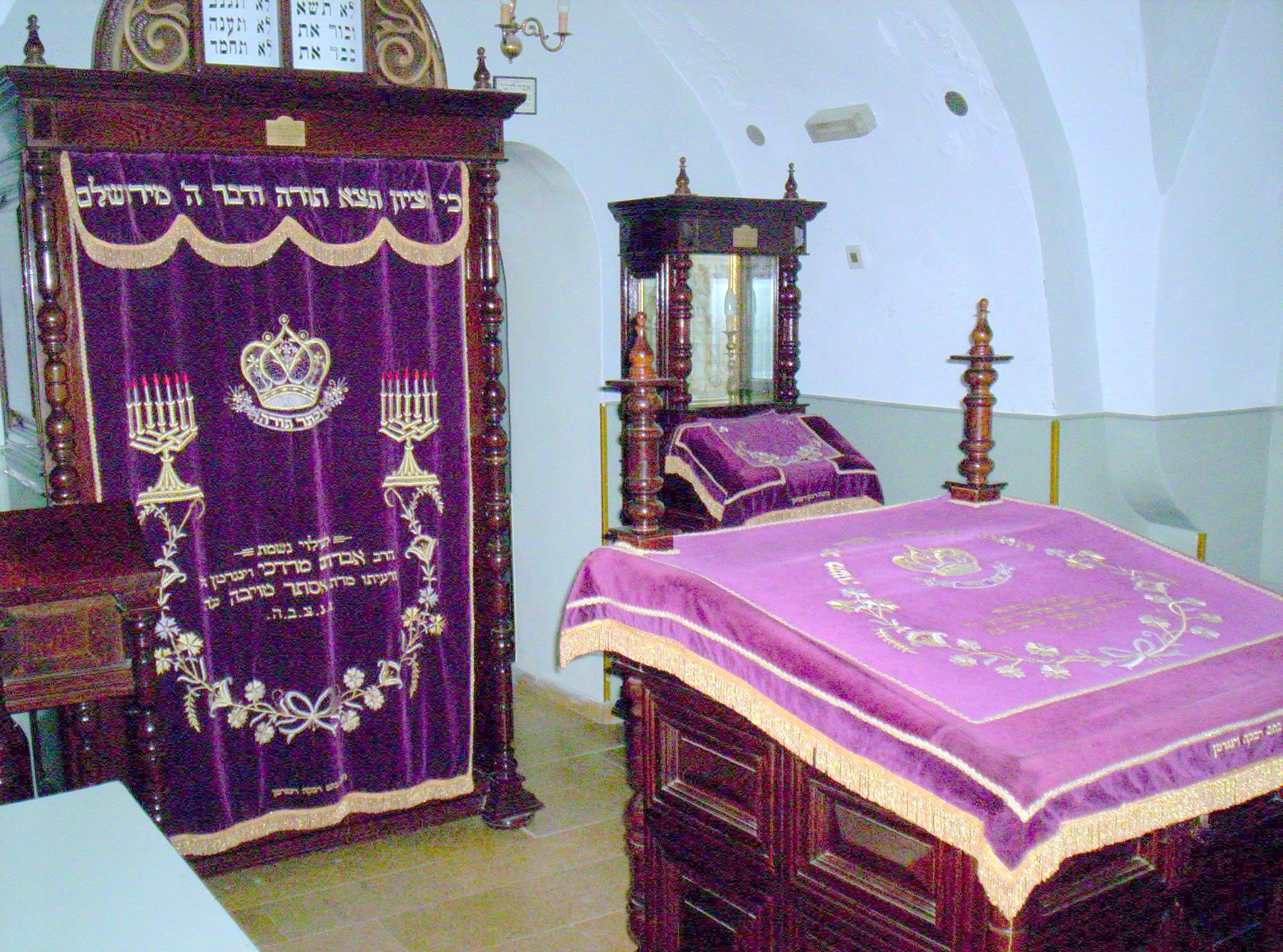
- Interior of the synagogue, in 2007

- Location of the synagogue in the Old City of Jerusalem

Religion
- Affiliation: Judaism
- Rite: Kabbalistic; Nusach Ashkenaz
- Ecclesiastical or organizational status: Yeshiva (1742–1948); Synagogue (1742–1948); Profane use (1948–1967); Synagogue (since 1967)
- Status: Active

Location
- Location: Ohr ha-Chaim Street (Ezra Street), Jewish Quarter, Old City, Jerusalem
- Interactive map of Ohr ha-Chaim Synagogue

Architecture
- Founder: Rabbi Chaim ibn Attar
- Established: 1742 (as a congregation)

The Ohr ha-Chaim Synagogue (Hebrew: בית הכנסת אור החיים), is a Kabbalistic Jewish congregation and synagogue, located on Ohr ha-Chaim Street, in the Jewish Quarter of the Old City of Jerusalem. The synagogue was named in honour of Chaim ibn Attar.

== History ==
Arriving in Jerusalem from Morocco in 1742, Rabbi Attar established a study hall in this building together with a women's section. In a room at the back of the men's section is where, according to tradition, Rabbi Attar would study with Eliyahu Ha-Navi. A number of years ago, a mikveh was uncovered near the stairs which lead to the women's section, confirming a long-standing tradition of its existence.

The synagogue is located on the top floor of a building which also houses the Ari Synagogue and Old Yishuv Court Museum. It is named after Rabbi Chaim ibn Attar's magnum opus, the Ohr ha-Chaim, a popular commentary on the Pentateuch.

Though the synagogue was founded by a kabbalist of Sephardic descent, the synagogue eventually came to serve the Ashkenazi community, headed by Rabbi Shlomo Rosenthal. When the Jewish Quarter fell to the Arab Legion in 1948, during the Arab-Israeli War, the synagogue was closed. It was reopened and refurbished after Israel captured the Old City in 1967.

== See also ==
- History of the Jews in Israel
- List of synagogues in Israel
- Synagogues of Jerusalem
