= World Soul (novel) =

Book by Michail Tichonovitsj Emtsev

- First English edition
- Author: Mikhail Yemtsev and Yeremey Parnov
- Original title: Dusha Mira
- Translator: Antonina W. Bouis
- Cover artist: Richard Powers
- Language: Russian
- Series: Best of Soviet SF Series
- Genre: Science fiction
- Publisher: Macmillan
- Publication date: 1964
- English publication date: 1978
- Media type: Print
- Pages: 178 pp
- ISBN: 0-02-536020-5
- OCLC: 3203598
- Dewey Decimal: 891.7/3/44
- LC Class: 77010908

World Soul is a science fiction novel written by Mikhail Yemtsev and Yeremey Parnov.
