= ATMA (electronic musician) =

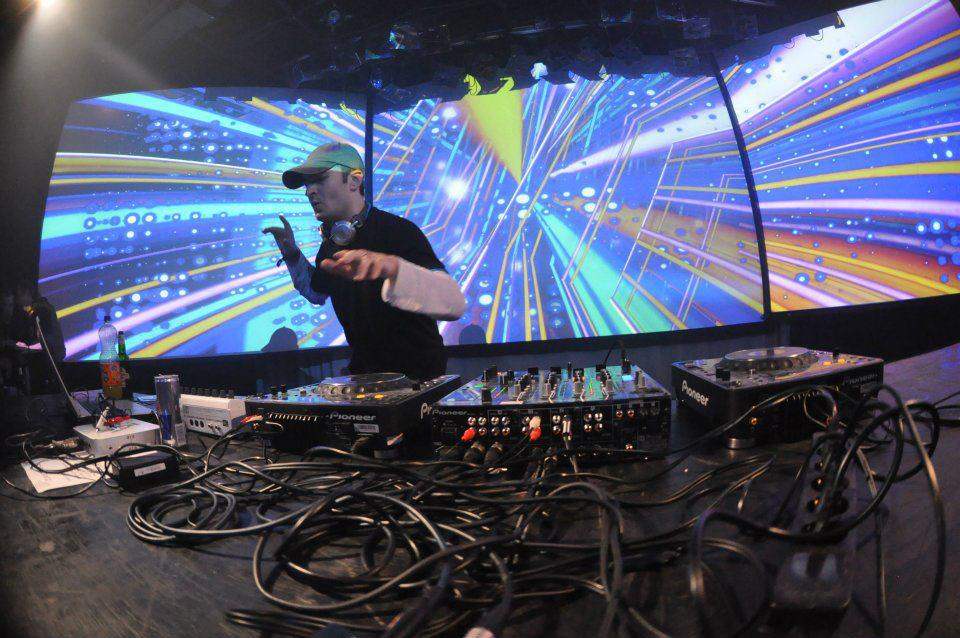

Background information
- Born: Andrei Oliver Braşovean; 20 August 1979 (age 46); Sibiu, Romania
- Genres: Electronic; Trance; Psy-Trance; Techno; Downtempo
- Occupation: Composer
- Years active: 1991–present
- Labels: Bmss Records; Y.S.E / Millennium Rec; Geomagnetic.Tv; Dacru Rec
- Website: https://www.facebook.com/ATMASTUDIO

Andrei Oliver Braşovean aka ATMA (born 20 August 1979 in Sibiu) is a Romanian composer, performer and electronic music producer.

Andrei Oliver Brasovean is one of the pioneers of electronic music in Eastern Europe. Born in Sibiu (Romania) and now living in Germany, he started to produce electronic music in 1991. Few years later he focused his productions mostly on trance, techno, downtempo and epic music.

Known around the globe for his unique style, and with more than 25 years of electronic music production and hundreds of live performances, ATMA made his entrance between the most established names in the electronic music scene.

With his long musical background and the experience of working different musical styles he developed a totally unique style of electronic dance music. Deep melodies, perfect harmonies, psychedelic sounds and pumping basslines, it's his "new definition" of the trance dance music.

After the great success of his first three solo albums, Beyond Good & Evil (Geomagnetic.Tv), The Secrets of Meditation (Millennium Records) and Music Revolution, released in December 2011 on the German label BMSS, Atma is back in business with his brand new album, Fall of the Idols, released in December 2017 on the Belgium label Dacru Records.

Beside his trance projects, Andrei works as music composer for commercial bands (house, techno, dance, pop, rock, hip hop..) but also as a film music producer.

On the international scene he performed on over 1000 festivals and music events all around the world: Dubai (U.A.E), Germany, United Kingdom, Swiss, Denmark, Austria, Italy, Sweden, Bulgaria, Romania, Macedonia, Serbia, Chile, Slovakia, Czech Republic, Poland, Hungary, Portugal, Russia, Ireland, Spain, Turkey, Greece, Ukraine, Cyprus, Singapore, Thailand, Indonesia, Malaysia, France, India and many more.

== Discography ==
=== Albums ===
- Beyond Good & Evil (Geomagnetic.TV 2006)
- The Secrets of Meditation (YSE / Millennium Records 2009)
- Music Revolution (BMSS Records 2011)
- Fall of the Idols (Dacru Records 2017)

=== Compilations / Ep's ===
- Various – North Influence Vol.2 (Skills Records 1998)
- Various – Mouse in House 04 (Roton Records 2002)
- Various – Mouse in House 05 (Roton Records 2002)
- Ov-Silence – Chapter Three (Ov-Silence Recordings 2004)
- Various – Delahoya 2004 (CD) (Skills Records 2004)
- Various – Revolve Magazine Winter 2006 (Revolve Magazine 2006)
- Various – Map of Goa Vol. 2 (2xCD) (Yellow Sunshine Explosion 2006)
- Various – Goa Trance Volume 5 (2xCD) (Yellow Sunshine Explosion 2006)
- Various – Goa Trip Vol. 1 (2xCD) (Goa Records 2007)
- Various – Goa 2008 Vol.2 (2xCD) (Yellow Sunshine Explosion 2008)
- Various – Goa Trance Missions Volume 4 (Goa Records 2008)
- Various – Goa Trance Missions Volume 6 (Goa Records 2008)
- Various – Goa Visions Vol. 1 (MIDIJUM Records 2008)
- Fed X – Overnight Xpress (CD) (Morning Star Records 2008)
- Various – Goa-Head Volume 25 (2xCD) (Leguan Records 2008)
- Goa 2008 Vol. 3 (2xCD, Comp) (Yellow Sunshine Explosion 2008)
- Goa – Neo Full On & Progressive Trance – Vol 5 (Yellow Sunshine Explosion 2008)
- Goa Moon Vol. 1 (2xCD) (Goa Records 2008)
- Various – Global Goa Trance Network Volume 2 (Yellow Sunshine Explosion 2009)
- John '00' Fleming – Goa Culture Vol. 1 (2xCD) (Yellow Sunshine Explosion 2009)
- Goa Trip Vol. 2 (2xCD) (Goa Records 2009)
- DJ Bim – Goa 2009 Vol. 1 (2xCD) (Yellow Sunshine Explosion 2009)
- Cosmic Connections – Chapter One (2xCD, Comp) (BMSS Records 2010)
- Various – Goa X – Volume 4 (CD) (Yellow Sunshine Explosion 2010)
- The Second Coming (CD) (Mind Tweakers Records 2011)
- Atma – Freedom Ep (Bmss Rec 2011)
- Goa Trip Vol 1 (Midijum Rec 2011)
- Various – 2012 Revival (Planet BEN Rec 2012)
- Insomnia Electronic Music Festival (Global Army Music 2014)
- Various – Summer Never Ends (Flying Spores Records 2014)
- DJ Bim & El Fabio – Goa Volume 61 (Yellow Sunshine Explosion 2016)
- Uncharted Vol VI (Dacru Rec 2017)
- Utopia Electrifying (Boundless Rec 2017)
- Atma – The Soul Mechanic EP (Dacru Rec 2019)
- Utopia Electrifying Vol 2 (Boundless Rec 2019)
- Uncharted Vol XIV (Dacru Rec 2019)
- Atma – Inner Balance EP (Dacru Rec 2020)
