= Divine soul (disambiguation) =

Divine soul in kabbalah is the source of good inclination and Godly desires.

Divine soul may also refer to:

- Ātman (Hinduism), inner self or soul
- Ātman (Buddhism), the concept of self
- Jīva (Jainism), a philosophical term to identify the soul
- Divine soul, concept in Sufi cosmology

== See also ==
- Soul
