= Al Attar Business Tower =

Office tower in Dubai, UAE

- Location within Dubai

General information
- Status: Completed
- Type: Office
- Location: Dubai, U.A.E.
- Coordinates: 25°12′49.95″N 55°16′41.26″E
- Construction started: 1998
- Completed: 2000
- Cost: $40,000,000

Height
- Roof: 158 metres (518 ft)

Technical details
- Floor count: 30
- Lifts/elevators: 6

Design and construction
- Architect: RTKL Associates Inc.
- Developer: Qatar Airways

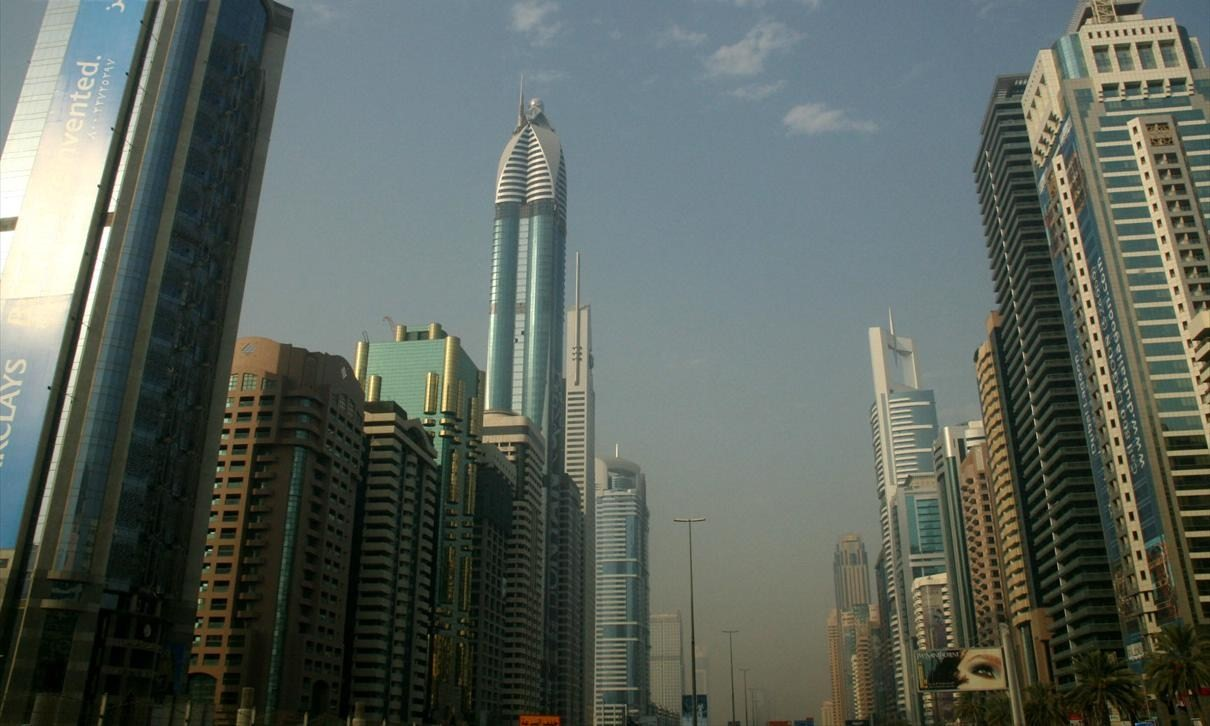
The building on the far left is the Al Attar Business Tower.

The Al Attar Business Tower is a 38-floor tower in Dubai, United Arab Emirates. The tower has a total structural height of 158 m (518 ft). It was built by South African construction contractor Murray & Roberts. The owner of this business tower is Al Attar Properties which did not deliver any of their promised project even after 10 years. They have been subject of extensive lawsuits by the investors.

== See also ==
- List of tallest buildings in Dubai
- List of tallest buildings in the United Arab Emirates
- Qatar Airways Inc
