= Stephen Benatar =

English author

Stephen Royce Benatar (born 26 March 1937) is an English author from London. His first published novel, The Man on the Bridge, was published in 1981. His second novel, Wish Her Safe at Home, was published in 1982 and reissued in 2007 and 2010. He is known for self-publishing and self-promoting his novels.

== Early life and education ==
Benatar was born 26 March 1937 to Jewish parents who lived in Baker Street, London; he grew up on Marylebone High Street. He attended King's College London and Sittingbourne College of Education. He has worked as a salesman, a hotel porter, and an English teacher at the University of Bordeaux.

== Writing career ==
His first novel, written at the age of 19 and titled A Beacon in the Mist, was rejected, as were 11 subsequent novels. At the age of 44 his novel The Man on the Bridge was accepted by Harvester, and edited by Catharine Carver. He received a £400 advance for the novel. His second published novel, Wish Her Safe at Home, was published by The Bodley Head the following year. The book was inspired by the 1947 film The Ghost and Mrs. Muir. It was runner-up for the James Tait Black Memorial Prize. He also won an Arts Council bursary. One novel, Such Men Are Dangerous, was published by Scunthorpe Borough Council. However, sales of his published books were poor, and he took to self-publishing subsequent novels, including Father of the Man, Recovery and The Golden Voyage of Samson Groves.

In 2007, he tried to get Wish Her Safe at Home republished by Penguin Classics but they turned him down despite an introduction by Professor John Carey hailing it as a masterpiece. He was turned down by 36 other publishers, so after slightly rewriting some of the passages he self-published 4,000 copies under his own Welbeck Classics imprint. He bumped into a man when returning some leftover wine from his book launch, and asked him to look at his book; that man was Edwin Franks, the managing editor of The New York Review of Books's publishing arm. Franks "read the book straight away and was knocked out", and The New York Review of Books published the novel in January 2010. Screen rights have been bought by a screenwriter who met Benatar in a bookshop, Henry Fitzherbert,. In March 2011, Capuchin Classics will re-issue When I Was Otherwise in the UK with an introduction by academic Gillian Carey. Manuscripts and proofs of plays and novels by Benatar are archived by the Howard Gotlieb Archival Research Center at Boston University, along with drafts, short stories, notebooks, research material, book review, and letters.

Benatar is known for his presence in bookstores every weekend, inviting people to read his work. He usually sells around 50-100 copies a day.

=== Reception ===
NPR said that "Benatar is a sharp wit whose many quirky novels have been unjustly neglected in the States". Emma Thompson, Joan Bakewell and Joanna Lumley are fans of his work.

NPR said of Wish Her Safe at Home that "Benatar has written a surprising and piercing depiction of one woman's unraveling and the type of alienated urban life that can drive a sensitive soul to the depths of madness." John Carey called it a "masterpiece". Doris Lessing wrote that it is "a most original and surprising novel". The Observer wrote that the book has "a brilliantly clever technique, with an impact particularly unsettling for those who choose to live alone." The Independent on Sunday wrote that "this horrifying exploration of madness at least deserves to be called a cult classic."

== Personal life ==
Benatar married Eileen Dorothy Bird on 23 January 1965; they remained married for 29 years until he came out as gay. They have two sons (Adam Luke and Piers Crispin) and two daughters (Prudence Hope and Dorothea Nan).

In 2007 Wish Her Safe at Home was reissued by Welbeck Modern Classics. John Murphy, his then partner, is credited with designing the cover.

== Works ==
- The Man on the Bridge, 1981, Harvester. A coming-of-age story about a young man in 1950s London who has a tragic affair with a rich gay painter.
- Wish Her Safe at Home, 1982, The Bodley Head. A tragi-comic drama about a genteel middle-aged woman who inherits a Georgian house in Bristol and slowly goes mad. The story is told from her perspective. The New York Review of Books reissued the book in its "Modern Classics" series in 2010.
- When I Was Otherwise, 1983, a black comedy about three people living in a run-down house in North London.
- Such Men Are Dangerous, 1985, Scunthorpe Borough Council.
- Father of the Man, Eagle, Nottingham, 1993
- Recovery, 1996
- The Golden Voyage of Samson Groves, 1998
- Letters for a Spy, 2005
- Two On a Tiger and Stars, 2006
- Stars, 2006
- A Christmas Story, 2009

Unpublished works include Across My Grave; Dead Reckoning; Firebrand; The Moving Staircase; The Road to Trevor Lomax, or Swimming with William; Superman in a Blue Suit; and Until We Met.
