= Yeremey Parnov =

- Born: 20 October 1935; Kharkiv, USSR
- Died: 18 March 2009 (aged 73); Moscow, Russia
- Occupation: Publicist
- Writing career
- Genre: Science fiction
- Notable work: Dusha Mira (translated as World Soul)

Yeremey Iudovich Parnov (Russian: Еремей Иудович Парнов; 20 October 1935 – 18 March 2009) was a Soviet and Russian-Jewish writer and publicist. Parnov attended the Moscow Peat University and worked as a chemical engineer. He also used to work as a professional journalist. Parnov is an author of several popular scientific works such as Фантастика в век НТР or Зеркало Урании (Science fiction in the age of scientific and technological revolution or Mirror of Urania), as well as dozens of articles, sketches and essays.

Strikingly foreshadowing concerns of later decades, in 1964 he collaborated with Mikhail Yemtsev to write the Soviet novel World Soul, (translated into English by Antonina W. Bouis). The authors write about a supercomputer which uploads all human identities and downloads them in a global nightmare of scrambled individuality. After several years of co-authorship with Yemtsev, this ceased in 1970. He died in 2009.

== Works ==
Screenplays

- The Casket of Maria Medici

=== Collaborative works with M. Yemtsev ===
Collected stories

- Uravneniye s Blednogo Neptuna; English translation: The Pale Neptune Equation
- Padeniye sverkhnovoy
- Posledneye puteshestviye polkovnika Fosetta
- Zelyonaya krevetka
- Tri kvarka
- Yarmarka teney

Novels

- Dusha Mira; English translation: World Soul
- More Diraka
- Klochya tmy na igle vremeni
