= Qahtan al-Attar =

Qahtan al-Attar قحطان العطار
- Born: September 14, 1950 (age 74); Ali al-Gharbi, Maysan, Iraq
- Occupations: Singer; songwriter; musician
- Musical career
- Genres: Iraqi music
- Instruments: Vocals; Oud
- Years active: 1971-1993
- Labels: Al-Nazaer Media Group

Qahtan Salih Mahdi al-Kinani better known by his artistic name as Qahtan al-Attar (Arabic: قحطان العطار; born September 14, 1950) is an Iraqi singer, songwriter, musician. He is known as el-Andaleeb el-Muhajer (Arabic: العندليب المهاجر).

== Early life ==
al-Attar was born in Ali al-Gharbi district, Maysan, Iraq on September 14, 1950. his family moved to Baghdad where he started his musical career in a talent show called rukn al-huwwat.
