= Chaim ibn Attar =

Moroccan rabbi (c. 1696–1743)

Ḥayyim ibn Attar
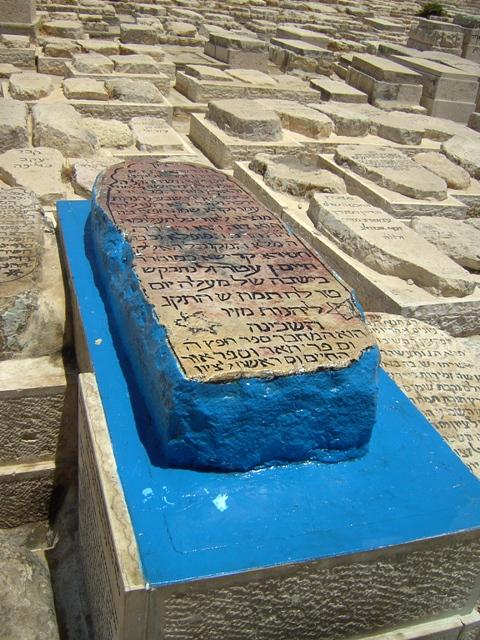
- Grave of ibn Attar on the Mount of Olives, Jerusalem

Personal life
- Born: 1696 Salé, Morocco
- Died: 7 July 1743 (aged 46–47) Jerusalem, Ottoman Empire
- Buried: Mount of Olives Jewish Cemetery
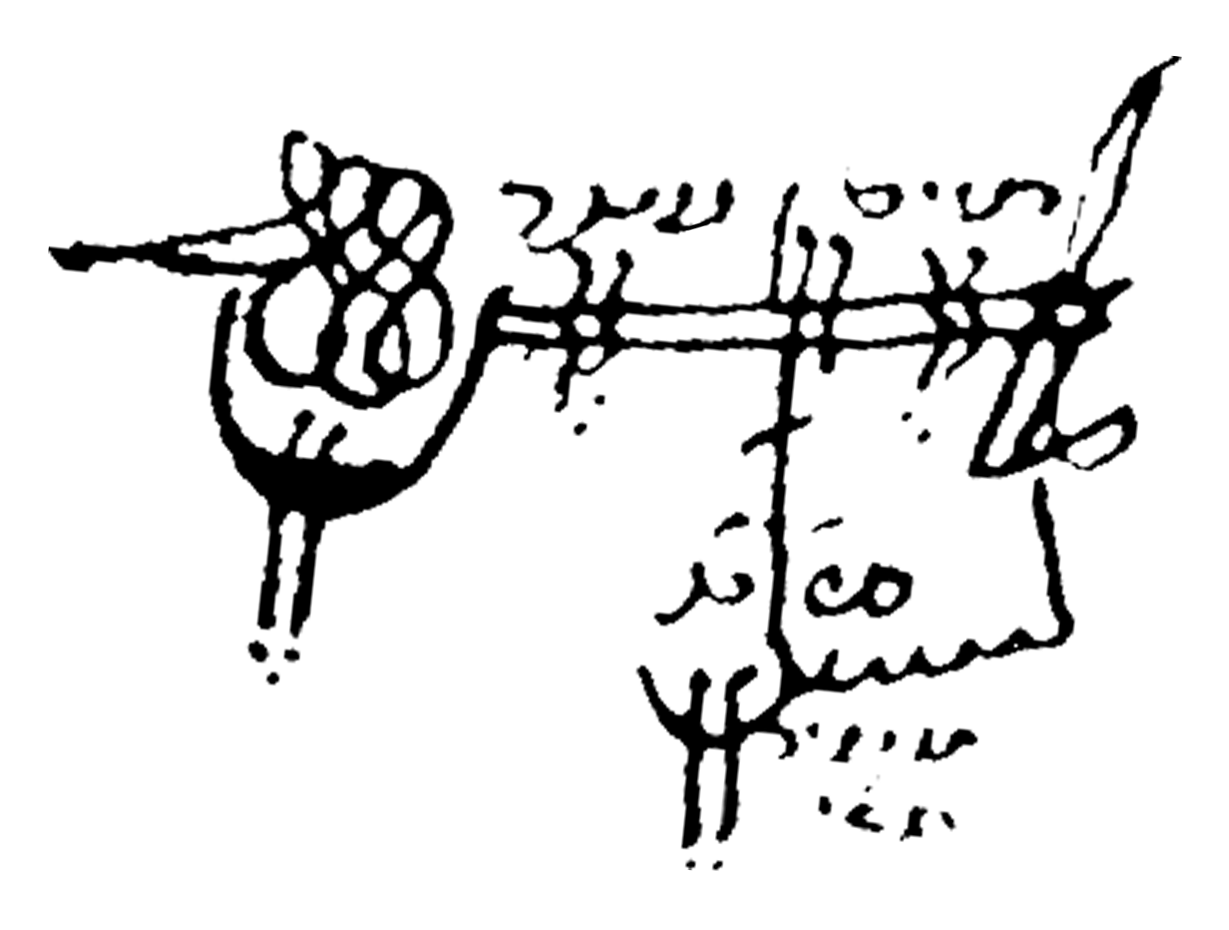
- Signature

Religious life
- Religion: Judaism
- Denomination: Sephardi

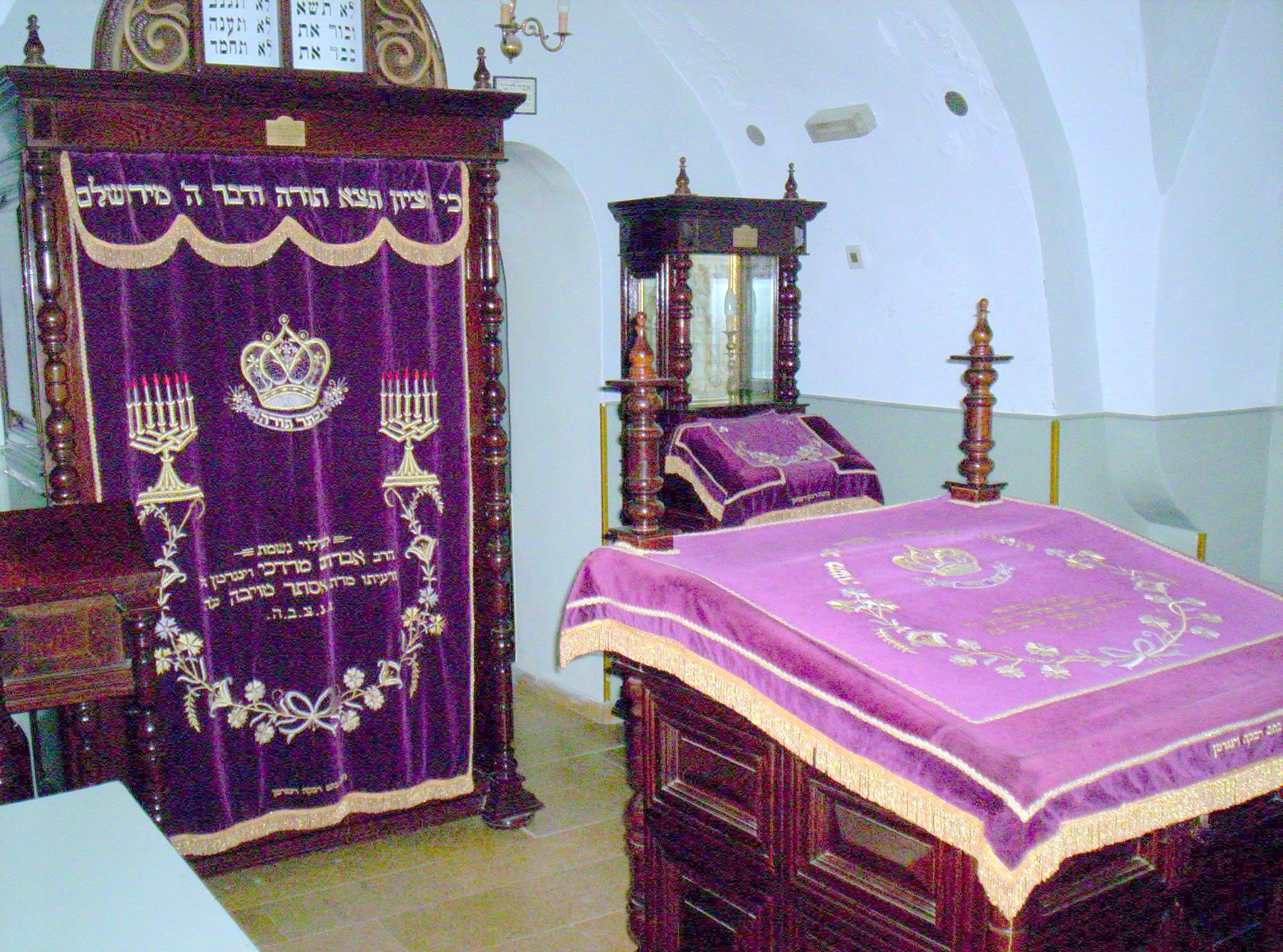
Ohr ha-Chaim Synagogue, Jerusalem

Chaim ibn Attar or Ḥayyim ben Moshe ibn Attar (Arabic: حاييم بن موشي بن عطار, Hebrew: חיים בן משה בן עטר; c. 1696 – 7 July 1743) also known as the Or ha-Ḥayyim after his popular commentary on the Torah, was a Talmudist and Kabbalist. He is arguably considered to be one of the most prominent Rabbis of Morocco, and is highly regarded in Hassidic Judaism.

== Biography ==
Born in Salé, Morocco in 1696, Chaim was the son of Rabbi Moshe Ben-Attar and the grandson of Rabbi Chaim Ben Attar (the elder), whom he learnt with in his early years. When he was nine years old, his family fled to Meknes, Morocco, escaping the local jew-hating vizier. He soon married a relative of his, named Fatzunyah, whose father supported him, letting him study Torah without the burden of supporting a household; he did not end up having any children with her, so he later would marry a second wife named Esther Bibas, with whom he had 5 daughters and no sons . He studied with them every Friday night the Torah portion of the week with explanations that was later written down and developed into his famed commentary 'Or ha-Hayyim al ha-Torah.' When his father-in-law died in 1724, his financial situation worsened, although the burden of support shifted to his father. At this time, he also ran a yeshiva in Salé.

When a famine hit Morocco, he decided to leave his native country and settle in the Land of Israel, then part of the Ottoman Syria. En route, he was detained in Livorno by the rich members of the Jewish community who established a yeshiva for him. This was in 1739. Many of his pupils later became prominent and furnished him with funds to print his Or ha-Ḥayyim (Hebrew: light of life).

Chaim was received with great honor wherever he traveled because of his extensive knowledge and keen intellect. Before permanently settling in the Land of Israel, he went to Algiers where he recruited students for a yeshiva he was planning on opening in the Land of Israel. He soon arrived at the Acre port in the Land of Israel with his two wives and thirty students. However he could not immediately proceed to Jerusalem, due to an epidemic. In the middle of 1742 he arrived in Jerusalem, where he founded Yeshivat Knesset Yisrael.

One of his disciples there was Chaim Yosef David Azulai, who wrote of his master's greatness: "Attar's heart pulsated with Talmud; he uprooted mountains like a resistless torrent; his holiness was that of an angel of the Lord,... having severed all connection with the affairs of this world."

On July 7, 1743, less than a year after his arrival in Jerusalem, Chaim died; it was on a Shabbat. It is said that that week in Europe, the Baal Shem Tov was sitting at Seudah shlishit, and before anyone in the area could have found out about Chaim's death, he exclaimed, "The light from the West has been extinguished!" He is buried in the Mount of Olives Jewish Cemetery in Jerusalem, Israel.

== Works ==
1. Ḥefetz Hashem (God's Desire), Amsterdam, 1732—dissertations on the four Talmudic treatises Berakhot, Shabbat, Horayot, and Ḥullin.
2. Or ha-Ḥayyim (The Light of Life), Venice, 1742—a commentary on the Pentateuch after the four methods known collectively as Pardes; it was reprinted several times. His renown is based chiefly on this work, which became popular also with the Hasidim.
3. Peri Toar (Beautiful Fruit), novellae on the Shulchan Aruch, Yoreh De'ah, dealing especially with Hiskiah de Silva's commentary Peri Ḥadash, Amsterdam, 1742; Vienna and Lemberg, 1810.
4. Rishon le-Zion, Constantinople, 1750—consisting of novellae to several Talmudic treatises, on certain portions of the Shulḥan Arukh, on the terminology of Maimonides, on the five Megillot, on the Prophets and on Proverbs.
5. Under the same title were published at Polna, 1804, his notes on Joshua, Judges, Samuel, and Isaiah.
6. See also one of his prayer we get today

== See also ==
- Chaim Joseph David Azulai
- Ohr ha-Chaim Synagogue

== Bibliography ==
- Michael, Or ha-hayyim, No. 894;
- Benjacob, Otzar ha-Sefarim, p. 541;
- Luncz, in Jerusalem, i.122 (epitaphs);
- Nacht, Mekor Chayyim, Hebrew biography of 'Attar, Drohobycz, 1898;
- Azulai, Shem ha-Gedolim;
- Franco, Histoire des Israélites d'Orient
- Assaf, David (2009). "'A Heretic who has No Faith in the Great Ones of the Age': The Clash Over the Honor of or Ha-Hayyim". Modern Judaism. 29 (2): 194–225. doi:10.1093/mj/kjp003. S2CID 7927756.
