= American Turko-Tatar Association =

Organization that represents Tatar interests in the US

- Американ Төрки-Татар Ассоциациясе
- Abbreviation: ATTA
- Formation: May 15, 1960; 66 years ago
- Type: Non-Profit NGO
- Purpose: Promote Tatar language and culture
- Headquarters: Burlingame, California
- Coordinates: 37°35′8.48″N 122°22′5.96″W
- Website: www.attasf.org

American Turko-Tatar Association (Tatar: Американ Төрки-Татар Ассоциациясе, Amerikan Törki-Tatar Assotsiatsiyäse, ئامەرىكان تۆركى تاتار ئاسسوتسىئاتسىياسە; abbreviated ATTA) is one of the oldest and most significant cultural and educational organizations of the Tatar diaspora in the United States. It is a non-profit organization located in Burlingame, California.

The mission of the association is to represent the cultural, ethnic, and religious interests of the local Tatar community.

== History ==
The association was founded on May 15, 1960, and traces its origins to the Moslem Unity Association (Tatar: Möselman Berlege / موﺱئلمان بئﺭلئگئ), which was established in New York City on March 15, 1927. Its founders were Tatar immigrants from Russia, China, Japan and Turkey.

Initially, the association held its meetings in the private homes of its members. As membership grew, the need arose for a dedicated building to accommodate meetings, cultural activities, religious education for children, evening prayers during Ramadan, and festival observances. In 1966, the association's board of directors unanimously approved the purchase of a building on El Camino Real in Burlingame, California. Because the building did not fully meet the community's needs, a task force was formed to oversee an extensive renovation. Construction took approximately one and a half years and was largely carried out by members of the Tatar community. Upon completion, the building became an important center for preserving Tatar culture, traditions, and religious life.

== Missions ==
- Preserving the Tatar language, culture, and national traditions.
- Organizing and holding festive and religious events.
- Strengthening ties between Tatars worldwide.
