= Chaim Ben Attar (the elder) =

18th century rabbi in Sala, Morocco

Personal life
- Born: Salé
- Died: 1720 (5481)
- Children: Rabbi Moshe ben Attar
- Known for: Head of the Yeshiva in Salé, Morocco
- Other name: Chaim ben Attar the Elder
- Occupation: Rabbi, Rosh Yeshiva
- Relatives: Rabbi Chaim ibn Attar (grandson)

Religious life
- Religion: Judaism

Rabbi Chaim ben Attar (also known as Rabbi Chaim ben Attar the Elder), was the head of the yeshiva in the city of Salé in Morocco and the grandfather and teacher of Rabbi Chaim ibn Attar.

== Biography ==
Rabbi Chaim ben Attar was the Rosh Yeshiva in the great synagogue of in Salé, called "the Ben Attar Synagogue (Tzalat Ben Attar)" because it was either founded, or belonged to, Rabbi Attar and his brother Shem Tov. The name "Ben Attar" means "spice seller."

He learned Torah from the Meshulachim Rabbi Chiya Dayan and Rabbi Elisha Chaim Ashkenazi..He was known for his diligence and he devoted even the short summer nights to Torah study. He used to rise every night and tearfully recite Tikkun Chatzot. He was known for hosting Torah scholars, and his house was considered a gathering place for rabbis.

In 1705, his brother and business partner Shem Tov ben Attar died, so he traveled with his son Rabbi Moshe and his grandson Rabbi Chaim to the city of Meknes, to supervise the business, along with his brother's children. However, according to Rubenstein, the family was forced to flee due to the persecution of the Jews by the local vizier.

He remained in Meknes for two and a half years, staying with the Nagid Rabbi Moshe De Avila.

Among his students were his grandson, Rabbi Chaim ibn Attar, Shmuel de Avila, the son-in-law of his son Rabbi Moshe, and the son of Rabbi Moshe de Avila, and Shalom Buzaglo.

Some of his teachings are cited in the writings of Moroccan rabbis. These were collected in the book "Iggrot Hamasa Lerabbeinu Chaim ibn Attar".

He lived a long time, probably more than a hundred years, and died in the year 1720. Rabbi Moshe Berdugo wrote a sermon that he gave as a eulogy.
