= Attarwala =

Indian muslim community

The Attarwala are a Muslim community found mostly in the state of Gujarat in India.

== History and origin ==
The Attarwala claim to be descended from a group of Mughal Hazara soldiers who were initially settled in Agra, during the rule of the Mughal Emperor Jahangir. According to their recorded documents, they then migrated to Ahmedabad via Gwalior, Ratlam and Godhra. This migration followed their participation in the community in the 1857 Indian War of Independence. Once settled in Gujarat, India, the community took up the occupation of manufacturing perfumes known as ittars. The word attarwala means the manufacturer of perfumes. A second migration took place in 1947 from Agra, after the partition of India, with some members immigrating to Pakistan, while others joining their co-ethnics in Ahmedabad. The Attarwala are now found mainly in Ahmedabad, India and some of them in Karachi, Pakistan.

== Present circumstances ==
The Attarwala are distinct from other Gujarati Muslims, as their mother tongue is Urdu. They are divided into fourteen lineages, the main ones being the Peer Baksh, Ammer Ali, Khorata, Mandusa, Hussainsa, Zahur Hussain, Mohammad Hussain, Khodar Baksh, Barkhan, Mashoob Khan and Ghulam Khan. These lineages are named after an ancestor. There is no system of clan hierarchy, and all the clans intermarry. The community marries among close kin and practice both cross-cousin and parallel-cousin marriages.

The Attarwala are a landless community and are still involved in the manufacture of attar, the traditional perfume of North India. Many now are wage labourers, involved in pulling a rickshaw. They are Shia Muslims and have their own caste association, the Shia Jafria Attarwala Jamat. The caste association runs a madrasa as well as other welfare activities.

== See also ==
- Hazara tribes
