= Tukay =

Tukay may refer to:

- Gabdulla Tukay (1886–1913), Tatar poet
- Tukay, Republic of Tatarstan, a settlement in the Republic of Tatarstan, Russia
- Tukay, name of several other rural localities in Russia
