= In the Rhythms of Tuqay =

In the Rhythms of Tukay (Tatar: Тукай аһәңнәре; romanized: Tukáy ahäñnäré, Russian: В ри́тмах Тука́я) is a vocal-symphonic poem based on the poems of Gabdulla Tukay, consisting of seven songs for voice and chamber orchestra, which Almaz Monasypov composed in 1975.

== Origin ==
The texts are by Ğabdulla Tuqay (1886–1913). He was one of the most famous representatives of the Tatar Renaissance of the early 20th century. Almaz Monassypov took the seven poems from different years. The work was completed in 1975 on the poet's 90th birthday. The first edition of the poem, arranged for baritone and piano, was published in 1976 by the Tatar Book Publishing House. The work was premiered in 1976 by baritone Emil Cӓlӓletdinov with the TASSR Chamber Orchestra under the composer's direction.

== Contents ==
The composer's interest in jazz is partly due to his collaboration with the Oleg Lundstrem Orchestra. Vocal-symphonic poetry is based, on the one hand, on features of Tatar and, to a greater extent, general Turkish music characteristic of the pre-revolutionary period. On the other hand, the work reflects the techniques of jazz, neoclassicism and even pop music. The work uses the Tatar folk melodies Täftiläw and A Few Horses. The 5/8 and 7/8 time signatures that are widespread in the poem, i.e. H. the metric features are characteristics, as in the folk songs Munadjat and Bajet.

There are two editions of the poem. The first edition was intended for the baritone Emil Cӓlӓletdinov, the second edition was published in 1993 for the tenor Idris Gasiew. The second edition uses the following instrumentation:

- Tenor with microphone;
- Two electric guitars;
- organ or electronic organ;
- piano with microphone;
- percussion with microphone;
- Doira;
- String orchestra.

No.	Name of the parts	Original title of the parts	Poems' title	Original name of the poems	Year of the poem	First Edition	Second Edition
1	(Introduction)	—	—	—	—	c-moll	d-moll
1	For the Homeland	Tuğan ciremä	For the Homeland	Tuğan ciremä	1907	C-dur	D-dur
2	Try to Reach People's Hearts	Quzğatmaqçı bulsañ xalıq küñellären	The Unnamed	Serläwxäsez	1909	fis-moll	g-moll
3	The Home Village	Tuğan awıl	The Home Village	Tuğan awıl	1909	c-moll	f-moll
4	Repentance	Täwbä wä istiğfar	Repentance	Täwbä wä istiğfar	1911	d-moll	e-moll
5	Broken Hope	Özelgän ömid	Broken Hope	Özelgän ömid	1910	F-dur	G-dur
6	I Did Not Know	Belmädem	Voice from the Murid Cemetery	Möridlär qӓberstanınnan ber awaz	1906	c-moll	d-moll
7	This Dark Cloud Over Us Will Disappear	Bu yämsez bolıt baştan kitär	Tatar Youth	Tatar yäşläre	1912	e-moll	f-moll

== Music ==
=== Introduction ===
The poem begins with an introduction to the theme of the folk song "A Few Horses" in the text by Tukaj. This theme, combined with Tukaj's arrival in Kazan, "the city of his destiny", becomes the leitmotif of the main character's fate. The introductory music is a gradually developing folk song melody accompanied by a growing rhythmic ostinato. The ostinato rhythm imitates the sounds of a running horse's hooves. Without using words, "A Few Horses" is in a way Tukaj's eighth poem in this poetry.

=== For the Homeland ===
The richly ornamented melody in a narrow vocal range is similar to Tatar book songs (a genre of Tatar folklore). The singing is accompanied by pentachords in the orchestra. Of the nine stanzas of Tukaj's poem, only six are used and form the three verses of the part.

=== Try to Reach People's Hearts ===
In the second part of the poem, the poem "The Unnamed" by G. Tukaj is used in its entirety. Most of the techniques used in this song, including the diatonic fifth fall sequence, correspond to the style of 1970s Soviet popular music. The episodes in which the organ sounds solo between verses are reminiscent of oriental music.

=== The Home Village ===
In the third part, only three of the four stanzas of Ğabdulla Tuqay's poem are used. The second verse, which mentions the Quran and the Prophet Mohammad, was deleted. The melody, which is reminiscent of a Munadjat chant with a time signature of 5/8, is accompanied by organ chords.

=== Repentance ===
The part completely uses the poem of the same name by Ğabdulla Tuqay, which is a response to Alexander Pushkin's poem "The Tenth Commandment". This poem is written in the genre of oriental poetry Nazire, as a retelling by the author of another author's poem. Small seconds and rhythmic features used in the passage are reminiscent of classical oriental music. In the introduction, Sornay's shrill sound is imitated with an abundance of small seconds. This duet between sornay and doira brings the song closer to the light music of the East (e.g., although the Nay is a wind instrument associated with Sufi ideas, it is more commonly used in the serious music of the East).

=== Broken hope ===
In the introduction to the part, the leitmotif "A few horses" sounds. The song is based on one of Ğabdulla Tuqay's most famous poems - "Broken Hope", sung to the folk melody "Täftiläw". The richness of the song lies in the fact that sections of singing and recitation alternate. This part is the lyrical center of the vocal-symphonic poem.

In bars 48–64 in the orchestral section there is a quote from the Tatar folk melody "Täftiläw". In order to make the counterpoint of the soloist's melody and the quotation sound more distinctive, the composer combines them in different time signatures. In other passages the folk song is used in modifications.

In bars 43–46 of the song, the first half of the leitmotif "A Few Horses" appears in the singer's part.

=== I Did Not Know ===
The sixth part is written on the poem "Voice from the Murid Cemetery" by Ğabdulla Tuqay, which was created under the influence of Ayaz İshaki's novel "Disappearance in 200 Years". One of the main ideas of this poem by G. Tukay is criticism of Sufism, but not rejection. Almaz Monasypov was forced to use a version of the poem approved by the Soviet censors: the 10th bayet above the novel "Disappearance" concluding the main idea was omitted, the word "Quran" in the sixth bayet was replaced by "Chulpan". This part was published with the original words by Ğabdulla Tuqay and a version adapted to the modern Tatar language by Nuri Arslan. In the repertoire of Idris Gasiev and Emil Cӓlӓletdinov, the song is performed only after the words of Nuri Arslan.

The music is based on the ascending and descending ostinato movement along the tetrachord.

=== This Dark Cloud Over Us Will Disappear ===
The last part is written based on the poem "Tatar Youth". The form of the song goes back to a version of the basso ostinato variations. With each new variation the changes increase. At the end of the sixth variation, the theme modulates into C minor (or C sharp minor in the II edition). At the end of the seventh variation they return to the tonality. In addition to basso ostinato, melismas, figures and textures are close to baroque music and are therefore reflected in the neoclassicism characteristic of European music of the 20th century.

== Reception ==
So far, "In the Rhythms of Tukaj" has been performed in concert halls in Kazan, Ufa, Moscow, Saint Petersburg, Yekaterinburg and other cities. The work with the voice of Emil Djalaletdinov was recorded on the ninth CD of the Tatar Musical Phonochrestomatie.

The third song, "The Home Village," is used as the main theme of the second movement in Almaz Monasypov's "Chamber Concerto for Three Flutes and Harp."

== Recordings ==
- Emil Cӓlӓletdinov, baritone; TASSR Chamber Orchestra under the direction of Almaz Monasypov; 1976
- Idris Gasiew, tenor; State Academic Symphony Orchestra of the Tatarstan Republic under the direction of Almaz Monasypov; 1993
