= Almaz Monasypov =

Almaz Monasypov Almaz Zakir ulı Monasıypov
- Born: 11 July 1925; Kazan, Tatar ASSR, USSR
- Died: 22 July 2008 (aged 83) Moscow, Russia
- Genres: classical, jazz, ethnic, pop music
- Occupations: composer, conductor, cellist
- Years active: 1953–2008

Almaz Monasypov (Tatar: Almaz Zakir ulı Monasıypov, Russian: Алмаз Закирович Монасыпов, 1925–2008) was a Soviet and Russian composer of Tatar origin. He was an art worker of the Russian Soviet Federative Socialist Republic (1987), People's Artist of the Tatarstan Republic (2000), and laureate of the State Prize of the Republic of Tatarstan named after Gabdulla Tuqay (1991). He used traditional Tatar musical techniques such as baits (Tatar: бәет), munajats (Tatar: мөнәҗәт), and booksinging (Tatar: китап көе) in modern music. The symphony-poem Musa Jalil (Symphony II) and the vocal-symphonic poem In the Rhythms of Tuqay (Tatar: Тукай аһәңнәре, Russian: В ритмах Тукая) are recognized as Tatar national musical classics.

== Life and career ==
Almaz Monasypov was born on 11 July 1925, in Kazan. His family often played music, including his father who played the violin. At the age of eleven, Monasypov entered the children's music school in Kazan to study the cello. His teacher at the music school and later at the Kazan Music College was Ruvim Polyakov.

In 1943 when Monasypov turned 18, he was drafted into the Red Army to serve on the Eastern Front. After the end of World War II, Monasypov entered the Kazan State Conservatory, where he graduated in 1950 as a cellist under Professor Alexander Brown. He returned to the Conservatory in 1952 to study composition. In 1956, he graduated from the Kazan Conservatory for the second time under Professor Albert Leman, and received a diploma as a composer. In 1964, Monasypov completed a post-graduate studies course at the Conservatory, specializing in opera and symphony conducting under Professor Isay Sherman.

From 1959 to 1970, Monasypov worked as a conductor at the Tatar State Opera and Ballet House named after Mussa Jalil. From 1970 to 1973, Monasypov was the conductor of the Symphony Orchestra of the Tatar State Philharmonic named after G. Tuqay. From 1968 to 1973 and from 2000 to 2003, he taught at the Kazan Conservatory in the Department of Composition.

Starting in 1972, Monasypov continued to participate in the musical life of the Republic of Tatarstan while living in Moscow through the work of the Union of Composers of Tatarstan and in the education of young composers. In 1991, he was awarded The State Prize of the Republic of Tatarstan, named after G. Tuqay.

Monasypov died on 22 July 2008 in Moscow and was buried at the Mitinskoe Cemetery.

== Music ==
Monasypov's works include several symphonies; he also authored hundreds of songs, romances, music for solo instruments, and a violin sonata.

=== Symphony-poem Musa Jalil ===
Dedicated to the famous Tatar poet-hero, the symphony-poem Musa Jalil (also Second Symphony, 1971) brought great success to Monasypov. The symphony-poem was intended to embody images of courage, heroism, and war.

=== Symphony III (1974) ===
In the Third Symphony (1974), Monasypov aimed to expand upon the philosophical themes of man's search for his place in the world and the necessity of resisting cruelty and violence. Embedded in the symphony's score is the rhythm from the Morse code SOS signal, which breaks through at climax zones in the development of the theme.

=== Symphony IV "Dastan"(1978) ===
The Fourth Symphony "Dastan" (1978) is an example of Tatar symphonic music. Monasypov often utilized rhythms of ancient baits (Tatar: бәет) and munajats (Tatar: мөнәҗәт), including them in his instrumental and vocal compositions. The symphony touches on themes of the spiritual world of Tatar culture.

=== Other works ===
Though he primarily created more serious pieces of music, Monasypov was also the author of many popular songs within the Republic of Tatarstan and far beyond its borders. One of his most popular works was the vocal-symphonic poem In the Rhythms of Tuqay, written in 1975. His compositions have also been performed by pop orchestras, including the Foxtrot "Hallar" ("Dreams"), which was included in the repertoire of a famous jazz orchestra under Oleg Lundstrem. In 1990, Musical offering to Salih Saidashev was written for the symphony orchestra, in which the author pays homage to the founder of Soviet Tatar professional music.

== Works ==
- In the Rhythms of Tuqay (1975)
- Symphonies I – IV (1963, 1968, 1974, 1978)
- "Musical offering to Salih Saidashev" (1990)
- "Kryashen melodies" (1998)
- Violin Sonata (1954)
- Incidental music
- More than 300 songs and romances with Tatar and Russian lyrics
- Various pieces for solo instruments

== Articles ==
- Монасыпов, А. Неразрывная связь: [воспоминания композитора о годах учебы в консерватории] // Казань. – 2005 – No. 5 – С. 18–19.
- Монасыпов, А. Как создать элиту. Оценки и прогнозы. Век ушедший и наступивший век. XX-XXI. // Казань. – 2001 – No. 2 – С. 71.
- Монасыпов, А. Неангажированный оптимист: [беседа с композитором накануне его юбилея] / Беседовала Т. Алмазова. // Республика Татарстан. – 2001 – 20 января.

== Sources ==
- Алмазова, А. (1986). Нигмедзянов, М. (ed.). Алмаз Монасыйпов // Композиторы и музыковеды Советского Татарстана (in Russian). Kazan. pp. 102–105.
- Дулат-Алеев, В. (2007). Татарская музыкальная литература. Казань: Казанская государственная консерватория. pp. 311–328. ISBN 978-5-85401-082-5.
- Shamsutdinova, Masguda. "В ритмах Тукая". Masguda I. Shamsutdinova's site (in Russian).
- Маврина, Ирина (3 April 1998). "Композитор Алмаз Монасыйпов: "Кайчак рус көйләре язсам да, мин татар композиторы"". World congress of the Tatars (in Tatar).
- "Моң патшасы Алмаз Монасыйповның тууына 90 ел". Сәхнә: мәдәният һәм сәнгать журналы (in Tatar). 31 August 2016.
