= Grigory Klyachkin =

Russian and Soviet physiotherapist, neurologist and scientist-physician

Grigory Abramovich Klyachkin
- Григорий Абрамович Клячкин
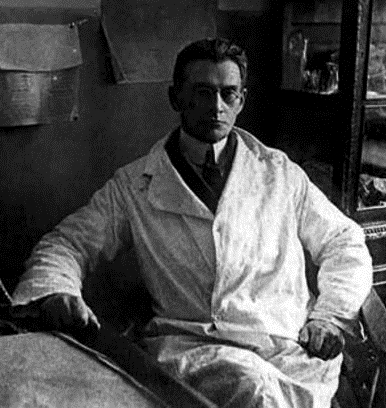
- Grigory Klyachkin
- Born: 3 October 1866; Ryazan, Ryazan Governorate, Russian Empire
- Died: 27 February 1936 (aged 86); Nyasvizh, Slutsky Uyezd, Russian Empire
- Education: Kazan Federal University
- Known for: Klyachkin Hospital's holder, Gabdulla Tuqay's doctor
- Scientific career
- Fields: Physical therapy, neurology
- Workplaces: Klyachkin Clinics, Kazan Military Hospital, Kazan State Medical Academy, Kazan State Medical University

Grigory Abramovich Klyachkin (Russian: Григо́рий Абра́мович Кля́чкин; 3 October 1866, Nyasvizh, Slutsky Uyezd, Minsk Governorate, Russian Empire – 21 July 1946, Kazan, Tatar ASSR, RSFSR, USSR) was a Russian and Soviet physiotherapist and neurologist, and scientist-physician.

He was born in 1866 in Nyasvizh to a Jewish family, he moved to Kazan and graduated from the Medical Faculty of Kazan Imperial University in 1891, then he worked in the clinic of neurologist Professor L. O. Darkshevich. In 1897, he defended his dissertation on the study of cranial nerves and received the academic degree of Doctor of Medicine. Inspired by the progress in physiotherapy and balneology he observed in Europe, he opened his own clinic in Kazan that same year. He introduced advanced treatment methods, becoming the founder of physiotherapy in Kazan. In 1905, he served in hospitals during the Russo-Japanese War. He participated in organizing the first emergency medical services in Kazan, taught, and was a member of the Kazan Merchant Assembly. In 1913, he treated the Tatar poet Gabdulla Tuqay, who soon died of tuberculosis.

In 1914, he joined the First World War, managing a neurological hospital in the frontline zone. In 1917, he returned to Kazan and joined the Kazan Military Hospital. During the Kazan capture by the White Army, he hid Bolsheviks under the guise of patients in his clinic, which was requisitioned by the Soviet authorities after the arrival of the Red Army in 1918. In 1920, he participated in organizing the Kazan Clinical Institute, becoming the head of the physiotherapy department. In 1921, he was appointed head of the newly established physiotherapy department, organizing a physiatric clinic based on his former hospital. In 1925, he was elected professor of the physiatry department. Simultaneously, in 1931–1932, as an associate professor, he headed the physiatry course at the Kazan Medical Institute. He retired in 1937 and died in Kazan in 1946 at the age of 79.

== Biography ==
=== Family and origin ===
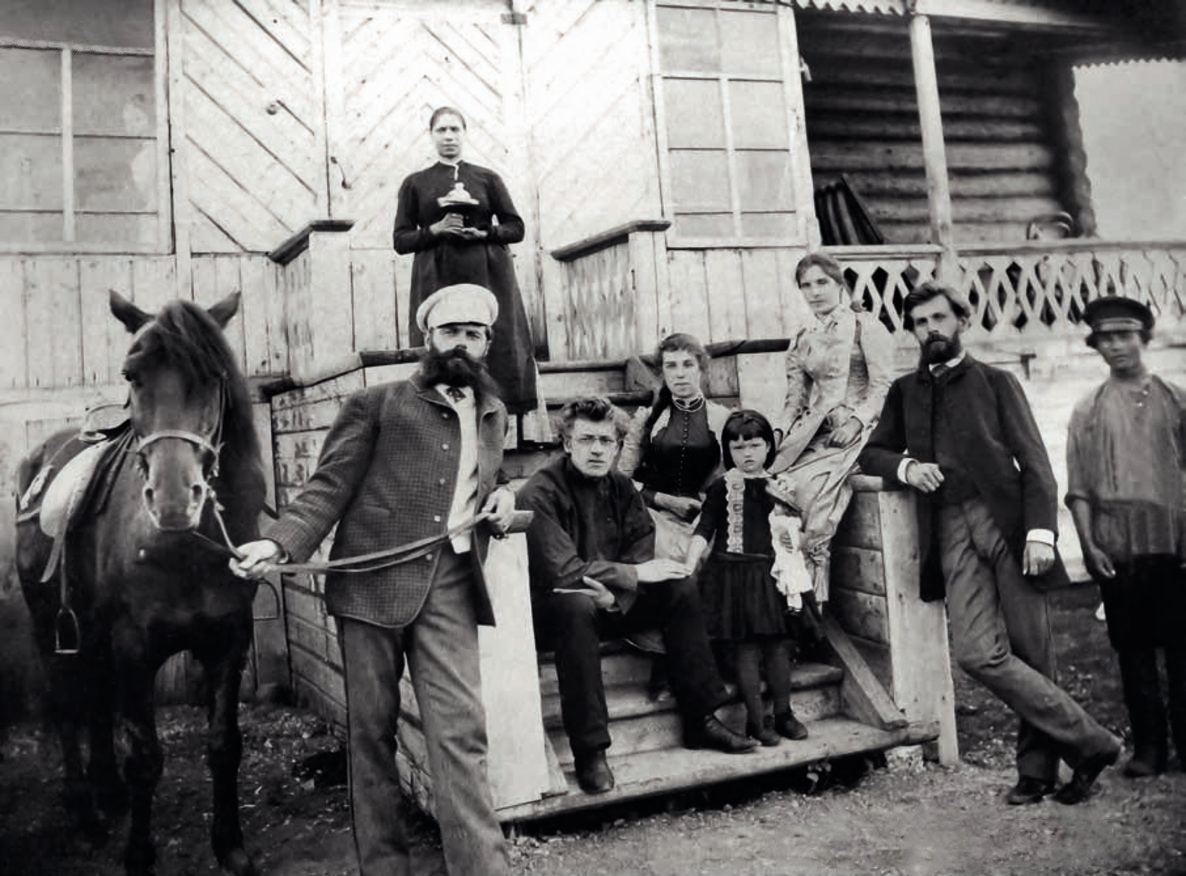
The Klyachkin family in Nyasvizh

Girsh-David or Grigory Abramovich Klyachkin was born on 3 October 1866 in the county town of Nyasvizh, Minsk Governorate.

By religion, he was Jewish. His parents were Abram Leibov Klyachkin and his wife Basya. The Klyachkin surname originated from the neighboring town of Klyetsk. His father was a craftsman engaged in furrier work, became wealthy, and rose to the rank of second guild merchant. In Nyasvizh, he owned a large house with a garden, governesses, servants, and a carriage. Having the right to live outside the Pale of Settlement, Abram moved the family to Kazan —a city known for its advanced education system— for the sake of his children's well-being. In Kazan, he did not confirm his merchant status and returned to being a furrier. After living in Kazan for about half a century, Abram Klyachkin died in 1917.

The Klyachkin family had six children: four sons and two daughters. Grigory was the eldest of the brothers. Nota (Naum, Nikolai) graduated from Kazan University, worked in Verkhneuralsk, was awarded the title of Hero of Labor, and died in prison during the Stalinist repressions. Mikhail (Meilakh, Meinar) also graduated from Kazan University and moved to Samara, where he became a well-known physician and owned his own clinic. David became an architect and emigrated to America during the revolution. The daughters, Ginda and Meri, lived and worked in Moscow, and before the Great Patriotic War, moved to Leningrad, where they died of starvation during the Siege of Leningrad.

=== Education ===
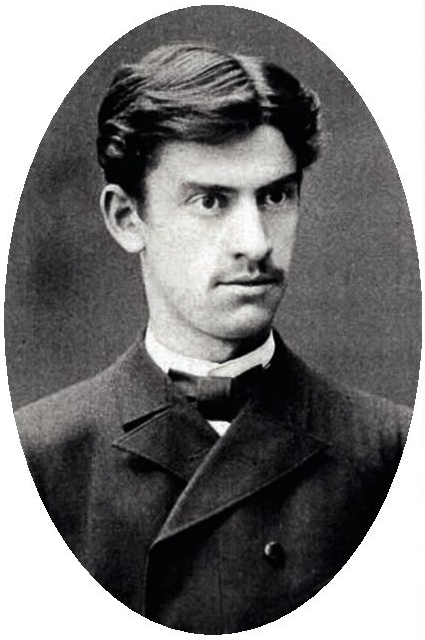
Klyachkin as a university student, 1887

He graduated from the Second Kazan Men's Gymnasium, where, despite a negative note in calligraphy, he received a silver medal, which exempted him from the taxable estate. In 1886, he enrolled in the Medical Faculty of Kazan Imperial University under a five percent quota for Jews without taking an entrance exam. During his studies, he prepared a paper titled Pathological Changes in the Nervous System Under the Influence of Phosphorus Poisoning, which won an award. He graduated from the university in 1891 and began working in Kazan's medical institutions. He was accepted into the neurological clinic of Kazan University, having worked for a year as a district doctor in a zemstvo hospital. In 1893, he joined the clinic of neurologist Professor L. O. Darkshevich, where he worked as an unpaid resident, living and studying on his father's funds. In Darkshevich's clinic, where Klyachkin worked for the next four years, his name was Russified from Girsh to Grigory.

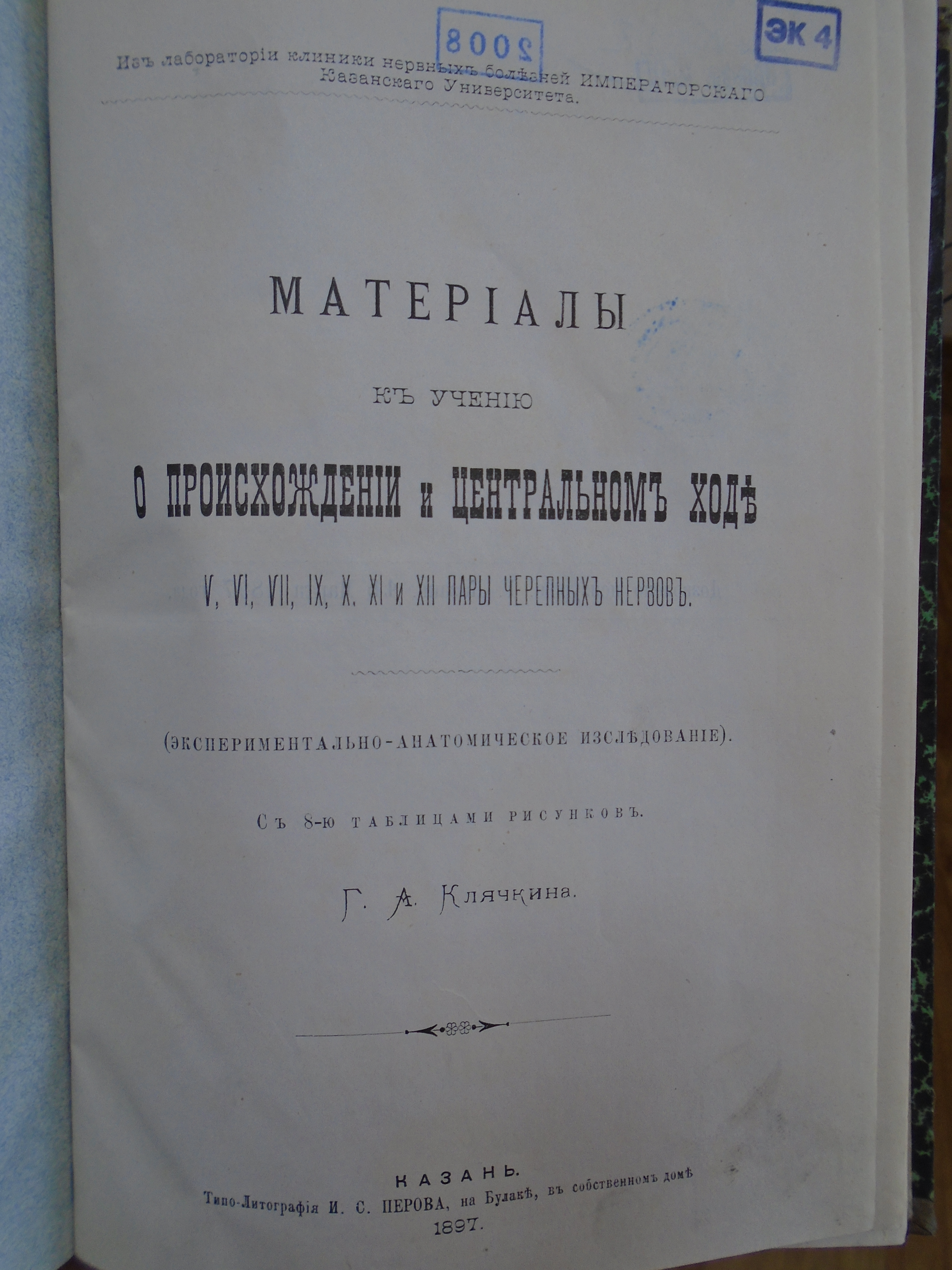
Klyachkin's dissertation, 1897

In 1894, Darkshevich suggested a topic for Klyachkin's doctoral dissertation, namely, to study the origin and central pathways of several cranial nerves using the embryological method of Flechsig through experiments on cats and dogs, staining their myelin sheaths with a solution of osmic acid and Müller's fluid. Funded by his father, Klyachkin was sent on a European trip to visit Darkshevich's colleagues, including the institute of Professor Rudolf Virchow in Berlin. Upon returning to Kazan, he began the experimental part of his dissertation. While working in the laboratories of Darkshevich and N. A. Mislavsky, Klyachkin identified differences in the staining of damaged and healthy myelin through experimental-analytical studies on cross-sections of the brains of experimental animals. Thus, he traced the pathways and connections of the V, VI, VII, IX, X, XI, and XII cranial nerves, refining or refuting the conclusions of his predecessors in the nascent field of brain structure studies.

In 1897, his doctoral dissertation, Materials for the Study of the Origin and Central Pathways of the V, VI, VII, IX, X, XI, and XII Pairs of Cranial Nerves (Experimental-Anatomical Study), was published. Its defense at the medical faculty council of Kazan University was successful, and Klyachkin received the academic degree of Doctor of Medicine. The work attracted attention in the neurological community, sparked some criticism, and even led to correspondence between Klyachkin and neurologist V. P. Osipov, who disagreed with his scientific conclusions. Klyachkin's extensive study of seven of the twelve cranial nerves later became the basis for training numerous students at many medical universities. However, the path to university science was closed to him as a Jew who refused to convert.

=== Medicine ===
For some time, Klyachkin worked at the country's first sanatorium for alcoholics, opened by Darkshevich in collaboration with the Kazan Temperance Society, excelling as a clinician and practicing, like all of Darkshevich's students, at the intersection of neurology, neurosurgery, and psychiatry. Nevertheless, he was deeply impressed by his European experiences, where he was struck by the organization of medical care, the development of private clinics and therapeutic institutes, and treatments using electric currents, light, heat, cold, mud, water, and massage. The scarcity of domestic treatment methods prompted him to open his own clinic modeled on the best European examples. Klyachkin aimed to introduce physiotherapy and balneology equipment in Kazan, which had only recently begun appearing in the markets of Saint Petersburg and Moscow. At that time, he lived in Nikolsky Rooms on Prolomnaya Street in Kazan.

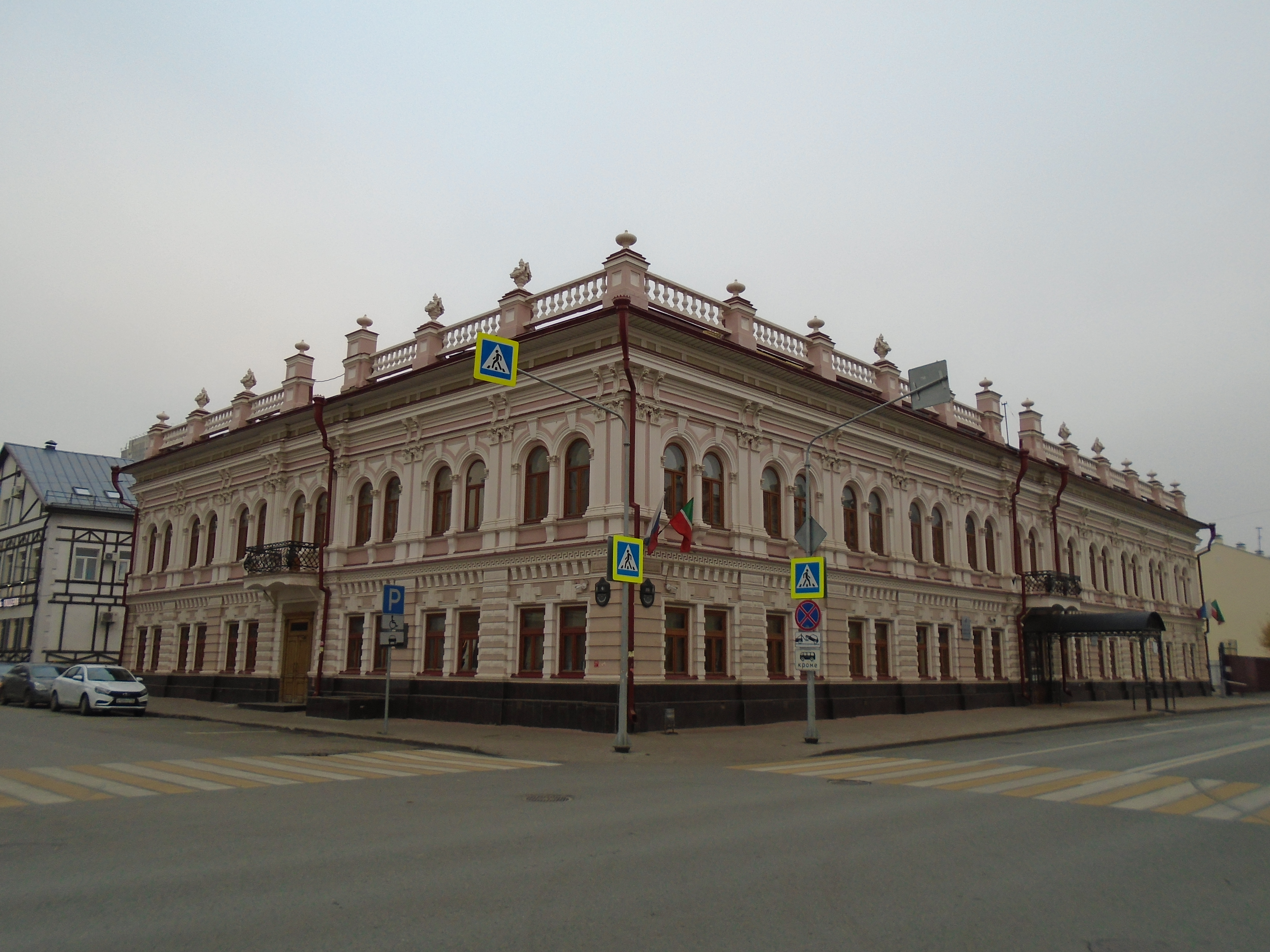
Klyachkin Clinic building, modern view, 2020

Based on several published scientific works, Klyachkin prepared a project for his medical facility, which was approved on December 22, 1897, by the Ministry of Internal Affairs of the Russian Empire as the Charter of a Hydrotherapy Clinic with a Cabinet for Electric and Massage Treatments by Doctor of Medicine G. A. Klyachkin in Kazan. Initially, he rented space in the tenement house of merchant Zhuravlyov at the corner of Voznesenskaya Street and Molochny Lane for the clinic and his apartment. Advertisements were placed in Kazan newspapers, and Klyachkin's business thrived. On May 22, 1903, at his request, the ministry approved a new clinic charter with an inpatient facility, an outpatient clinic for walk-in patients, therapeutic, surgical, and gynecological departments, and a large physiotherapy and hydrotherapy department. For this purpose, Klyachkin rented the entire building and courtyard structures from Zhuravlyov's heirs. According to some sources, his father also provided funds for the clinic. In his clinic, Klyachkin used cutting-edge electrical equipment modeled on the best foreign sanatoriums, including ultraviolet lamps by Nobel laureate Niels Finsen. According to newspaper advertisements, the hospital, called the Institute of Physical Treatment Methods, operated year-round, accepted walk-in patients daily, had permanent beds, offered consultations with doctors, and included departments for nervous, internal, and gynecological diseases. It offered massage, a hydro-electro-phototherapy facility, an X-ray room, and equipment for D'Arsonval currents and radioactive quackery for treating gout, neuralgia, rheumatism, and diabetes with radium. The clinic was unparalleled among state and private hospitals, renowned for its high-quality medical care and the democratic attitude of its staff. Klyachkin himself held unquestionable authority and was widely known in Kazan. As the founder of Kazan physiotherapy, he authored works on hydro- and electrotherapy methods and the physiological foundations of heliotherapy. It is even possible that he invented the germicidal lamp. Klyachkin prospered and became a member of the Kazan Merchant Assembly; he owned a two-story apartment with a garage and a car in the city center on Lobachevsky Street.

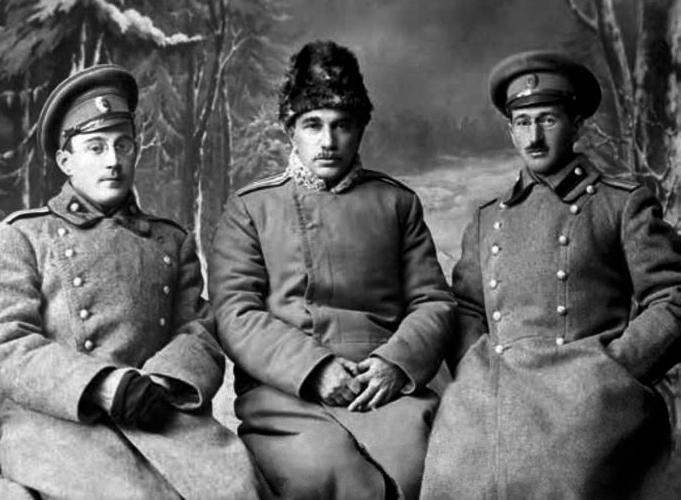
Elinson (center) and Klyachkin (right) — military hospital doctors, 1905

In 1905, together with his friend an ophthalmologist A. A. Elinson, he was drafted as a doctor for the Russo-Japanese War, where he worked in a hospital. Elinson, also a student of Mislavsky, discovered the vasomotor nerves of the retina under his guidance in 1896, taught at the Kazan Paramedic School, headed the eye department of the Kazan Provincial Hospital, and later ran a large ophthalmological clinic on Voskresenskaya Street. Nearby, on Prolomnaya Street, was the clinic of R. A. Luria, who also served as a doctor in the Russo-Japanese War. Elinson, Luria, and Klyachkin were friends and collaborated on medical projects. Thus, in 1902, with the support of the Kazan Physicians' Society and Luria personally, the first free ambulance service in Kazan was organized at Klyachkin's clinic. Klyachkin and Elinson funded a carriage stationed in the clinic's courtyard, created a duty schedule for staff, who responded immediately to calls.

=== Gabdulla Tuqay's treatment ===
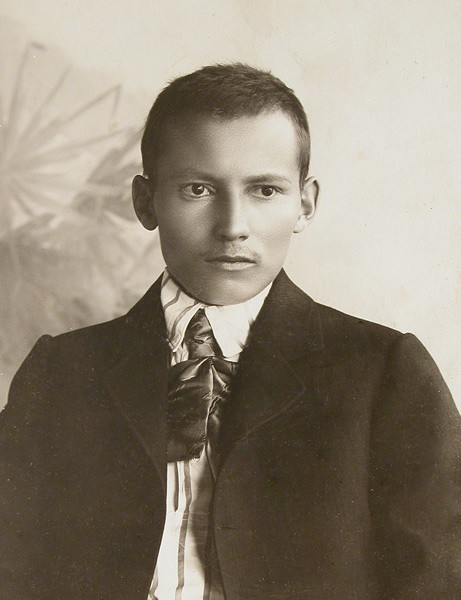
Gabdulla Tuqay, 1912

On 26 February 1913, the Tatar poet Gabdulla Tuqay was admitted to Klyachkin's clinic due to a worsening of his condition. As a child, Tuqay was an orphan, suffered from hunger and cold, and likely contracted tuberculosis of the eye at that time, (Note: A village sorceress “treated” the boy's eyes with powdered sugar, as a result of which an “eyesore” formed on one of them and he became completely blind. Wandering through foster homes, Gabdullah was considered an “extra mouth” and when he became ill, everyone looked forward to his death. Nevertheless, despite the lack of care and affection, Tuqay survived.) which later spread to his lungs, exacerbated by poor living conditions and malnutrition. Settling in the city, Tuqay rented the cheapest room in Bulgar hotel, damp and cold, on one of Kazan's ugliest streets, specifically at the corner of Moskovskaya and Evangelistovskaya. The poet lived in dire poverty and penury, earning almost nothing from publishers profiting off his books' circulation. This further harmed his health. Tuqay suffered from chills, fever, and coughing, compounded by heavy smoking.

Later, Tuqay moved to Amur hotel room, from where he was hospitalized due to a sharp deterioration in his health. Tuqay knew his diagnosis, his condition were getting worse, even leading to hemoptysis, yet he avoided doctors, as he «did not believe in medicine» and had «decided to live alone, go nowhere, receive no one, eat and sleep, read and write, be ill and not groan»; finally, out of despair, unable to care for himself or fight the disease alone, he was forced to seek hospital care. Tuqay's friends, revolutionary-minded youths, saw a kindred spirit in Klyachkin and decided he could help the poet. Klyachkin met Tuqay in his office, personally examined him, and decided to admit him to the inpatient ward. Klyachkin violated his clinic's charter, which prohibited admitting contagious patients, such as Tuqay, who had an open form of tuberculosis. The clinic was under constant supervision by the medical department of the Kazan Provincial Administration, to which urgent reports and patient information were sent. For registration at the local police station during treatment, patients presented identity documents, which Klyachkin was obliged to keep in his safe until discharge. Nevertheless, he concealed Tuqay's hospitalization from the authorities and kept his passport in his safe.

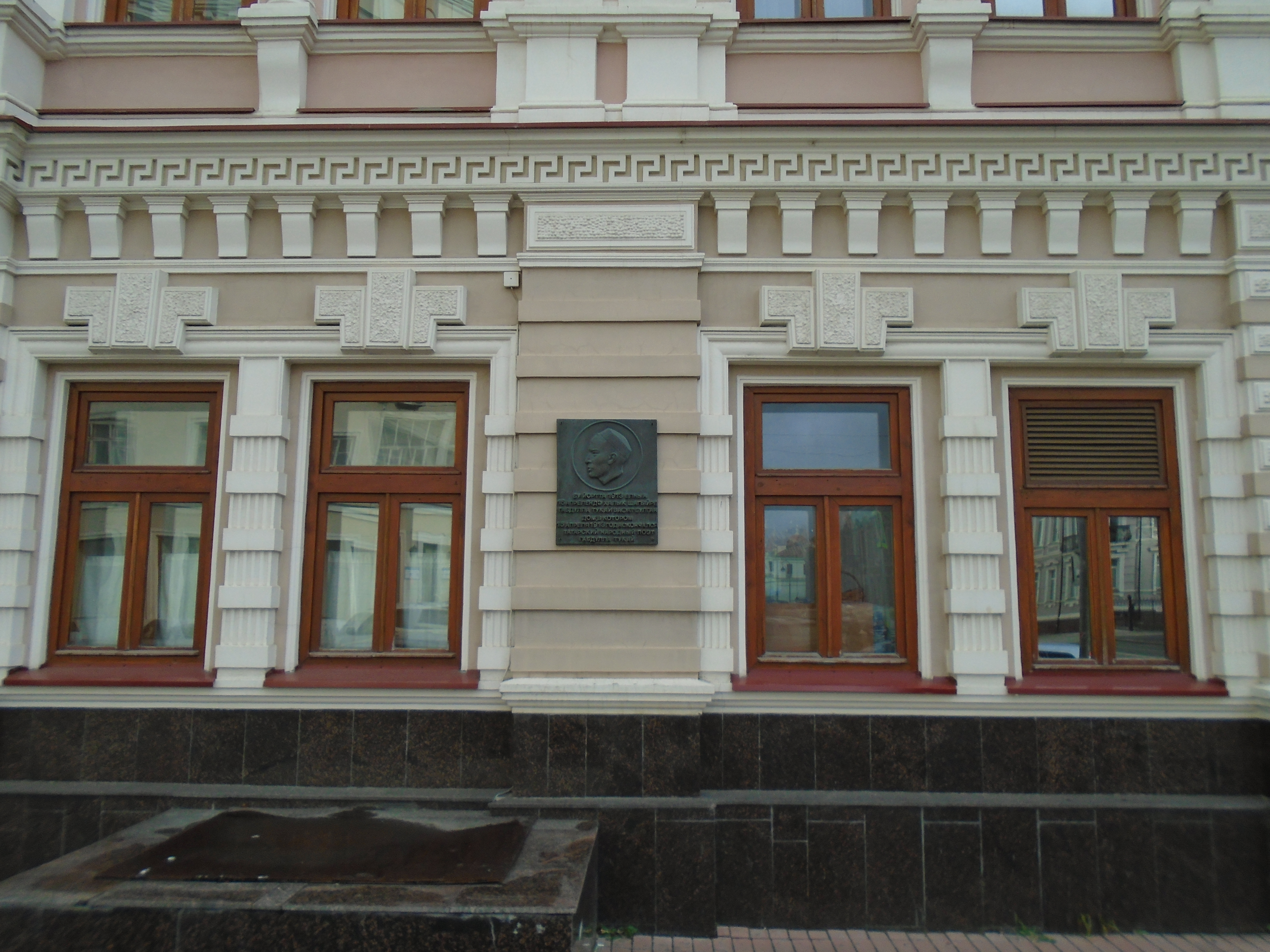
Windows of Tuqay's ward, 2020

The clinic was not the most expensive in the city, but a month's treatment cost 150 rubles, a significant amount for that time. According to the charter, Klyachkin could admit indigent patients free of charge at his discretion, for which one free bed was allocated in the general ward. Due to Tuqay's condition, he was placed on the ground floor in a single room with two windows overlooking Molochny Lane. Unlike hotel rooms, it was a warm, bright room with a high ceiling, running water, a faience washbasin, and a toilet. Tuqay had a bed with pillows and a blanket, linens, pajamas, a flannel robe, towels, slippers, and clean dishes. He was fed three times a day and cared for by orderlies and nurses. For consultations, Klyachkin invited his doctor friends from nearby streets: Luria agreed to be Tuqay's attending physician, while Elinson treated his eyes.

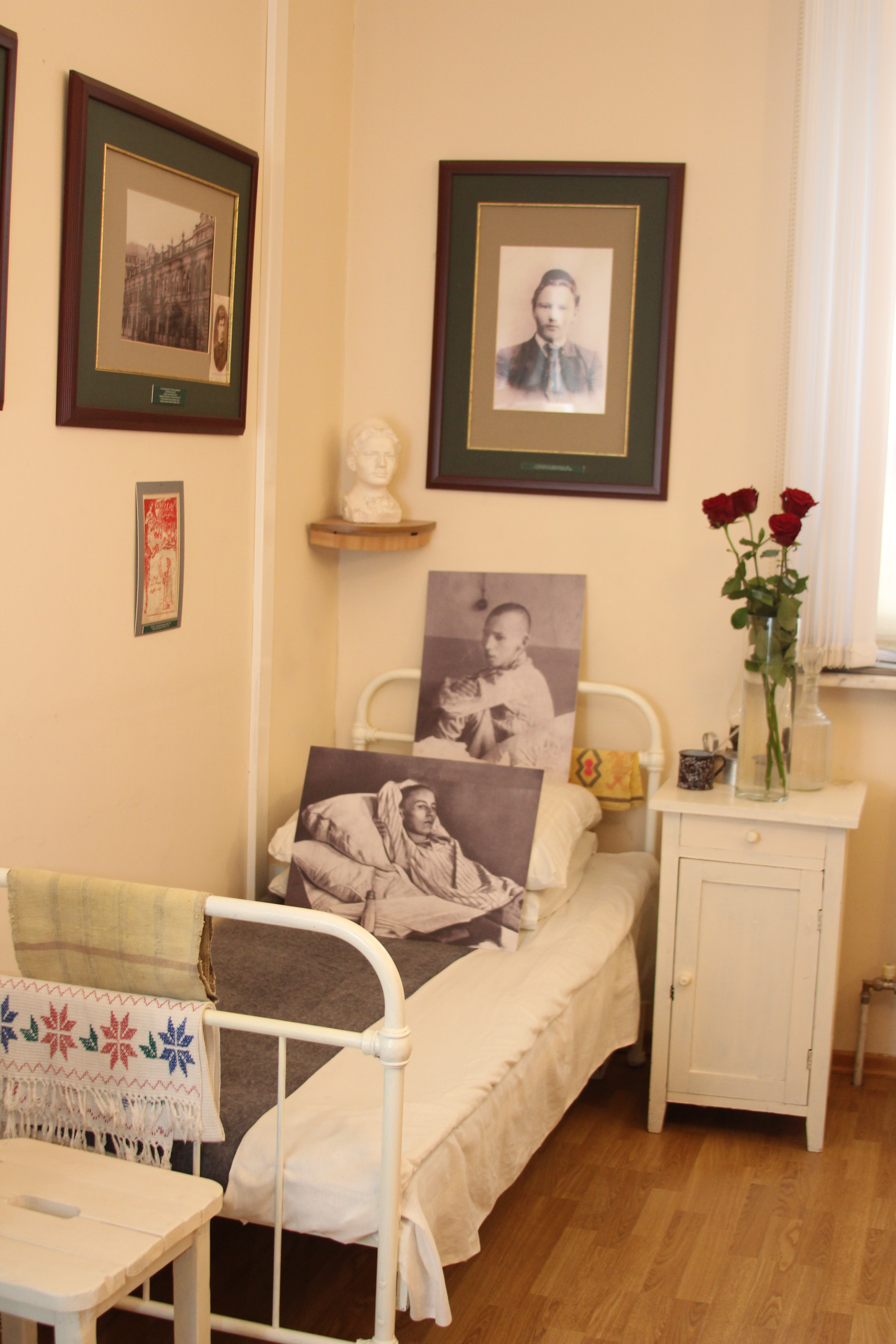
Reconstructed Tuqay ward, 2019

Diagnosing consumption, complete destruction of one lung, preservation of only a small part of the other, advanced tuberculous eye disease and blindness, severe wasting, pulmonary, and cardiac failure, the doctors concluded that Tuqay had less than a month to live. At the time, tuberculosis was not effectively treatable; Tuqay may have received camphor injections and strophanthus tincture. Klyachkin effectively gave the poet a month of productive work, his last. The hospital saw a stream of Tuqay's friends, admirers, and strangers. He worked extensively, sending poems, articles, and feuilletons to various newspapers and magazines, regularly reading Tatar and Russian periodicals, and preparing a large collection of his selected works for publication. On March 14, the Koyash newspaper published an article written from his hospital bed, The First Task Upon Awakening, (Note: "Me myself, coming closer and closer to my desire to "at least get sick," kept waiting for the time to somehow clean my spiritual room, hoping that Allah would give me a way. Now Allah has given me a way and I have been freed to clean my "room". Already swept clean. Hey, Turkish child in every corner of the world! Scholar, philosopher, padishah, or beggar! Now I am not ashamed to let you into my room, whoever you are; I can present my book of poems to you myself, praising it".) a kind of poetic testament and Tuqay's own literary-critical assessment of his work.

The 47-year-old Klyachkin, despite a twenty-year age difference, spent entire evenings at Tuqay's bedside discussing literature, sharing books from his personal library, and even sending his lawyer to protect the poet's copyrights from encroaching publishers. Though gravely ill, Tuqay, who called himself a true socialist, continued to be interested in Russian public thought, artistic and political literature, including banned works.

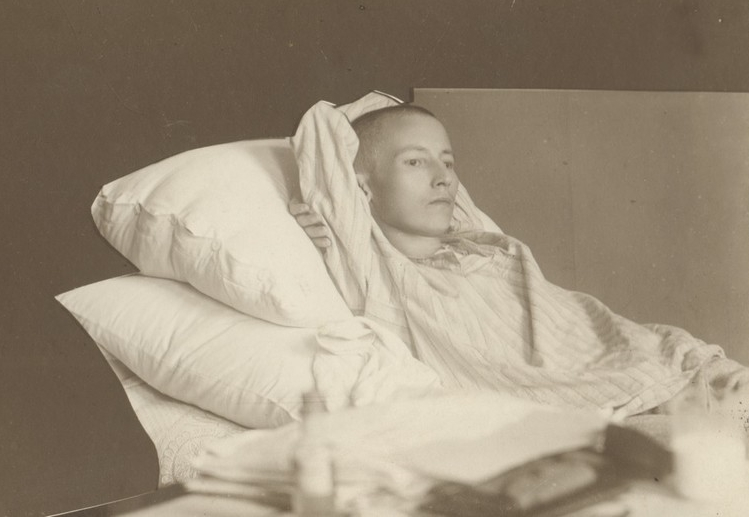
One of Tukay's last photographs, 1 April 1913

On March 28, four days before his death, Tuqay wrote his final poems (Tolstoy's Words, At Leisure, School). Two days later, he could no longer write, setting down his pen. On March 31, Luria visited Tuqay, comforting him with words of recovery, but privately told the poet's friends he had only days left. By evening, Tuqay's condition worsened sharply, with a fever and breathing difficulties, keeping him awake all night. On April 1, when asked about his condition, the poet replied with one word: death. That same day, Tuqay's friends invited photographer I. M. Jacobson, who, with the poet's permission, captured his image. It was at Klyachkin's hospital, the day before Tuqay's death, that his last photographs were taken. That day, the poet also left a verbal will: the five hundred rubles owed by publishers were to be used as a scholarship for a talented Tatar orphan child to study at a higher educational institution.

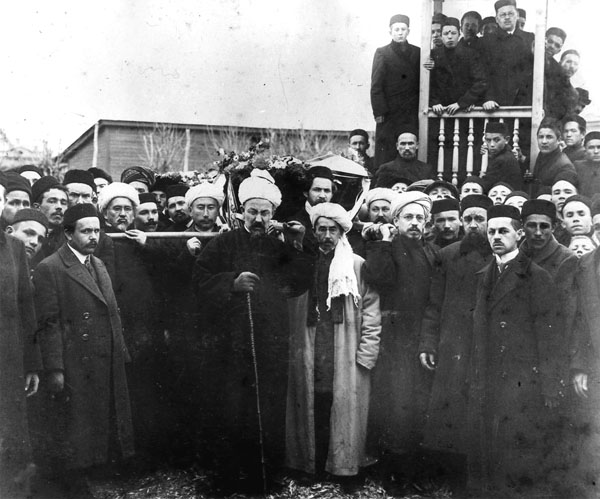
Funeral procession at Tuqay's funeral, April 4, 1913

That night, Tuqay felt some relief and had a lively conversation with friends over tea, but the improvement was brief. On 2 April 1913, at 8:15 p.m., the poet died at the age of 26. Tuqay spent just over a month in the hospital; he died in the same month he was born, at the height of his creative powers and talent. Klyachkin handed Tuqay's passport and the hospital's urgent ticket, detailing the diagnosis, treatment duration, and methods, signed by him, to the local police station. During the revolutionary chaos, these documents, along with other police archives and the entire Klyachkin clinic archive, were destroyed. On April 4, a final photograph of Tuqay's open face was taken, and a death mask was made. His body was placed in a coffin adorned with wreaths and ribbons of his poems. The funeral procession then proceeded on foot from the Klyachkin Hospital courtyard. A janaza was recited at Yunusov Square, and Tuqay was buried at the Old Tatar Cemetery. The farewell turned into a spontaneous demonstration, with about ten thousand people participating. Years later, Klyachkin frequently recalled his role in treating and bidding farewell to Tuqay, describing him as an extraordinary and erudite person, and sharing stories with his family and clinic about the spring of 1913, calling the brief encounter with the poet the most significant event of his life. (Note: The Okhrana who persecuted Tukai during his lifetime did not abandon him after his death: the gendarmes actively monitored funerals, and participation in them was interpreted as grounds for prosecution. At the same time, many businessmen, shops, and newspapers made a considerable amount of money from photographs, publications, and things associated with Tukai's name, even though they did not pay him the attention he deserved during his lifetime.) He consistently emphasized that humanism should be the mindset and way of life for both a doctor and a person in general.

=== During wars and revolutions ===
As the director and doctor of his hospital, Klyachkin also served as a consultant at the Alexandrovskaya Clinic for walk-in patients and taught at a private women's paramedic-midwifery school, while occasionally experimenting in Darkshevich's laboratory and participating in the scientific meetings of his clinic. Like V. I. Bekhterev, Klyachkin studied the connection between nervous and psychiatric disorders, describing the clinical presentations of their various forms. For treating neuroses and alcoholism, he used combined-reflex therapy, psychotherapy through distraction, and group psychotherapy.

Klyachkin eagerly shared with journalists his interest in studying human superpowers, discussing the foundations of giftedness and genius, intuition, unusual abilities, and strange phenomena, as well as recounting stories of prophetic dreams. He also actively supported the use of hypnosis, arguing that «a doctor's duty requires using all knowledge and skill to alleviate a patient's suffering». He frequently traveled abroad to advance his expertise in neurology and physiatry, notably participating in the International Neurology Congress in 1912.

In 1914, after the outbreak of war with Germany, 48-year-old Klyachkin, already beyond conscription age, volunteered for the front. As a volunteer, he managed a neurological military hospital in the frontline zone for three years. In 1917, he returned to Kazan and became a consulting physician at the Kazan Military Hospital, working as a resident in one of the city's hospitals. After the capture of Kazan by Komuch troops, he hid Bolsheviks under the guise of patients in his clinic. In 1918, he did not leave with the retreating Komuch troops and remained in Kazan, despite his clinic being requisitioned by the Soviet authorities. For the next two years, he worked as a neurologist in the city's military hospital.

=== In Soviet medicine ===
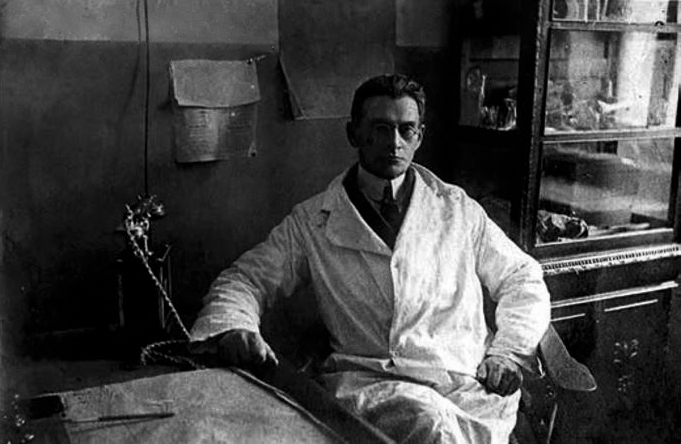
Professor Grigory Klyachkin in his office, 1925

In 1920, he participated in organizing the Kazan Clinical Institute, established at a ceremonial meeting of the Kazan Provincial Executive Committee dedicated to the 50th anniversary of V. I. Lenin. Luria was elected director of the institute, having served as the chief physician of Kazan's ambulance station since 1919. The institute was designed for retraining and further education of temporary doctors returning from the front, who were drafted without diplomas and could no longer practice, and who could not complete their education at Kazan University, which was on the verge of closure. Kazan, a rear hospital base, was filled with wounded and disabled individuals, for whom physical and balneological treatment methods were proposed. This is why Luria invited Klyachkin to join the institute.

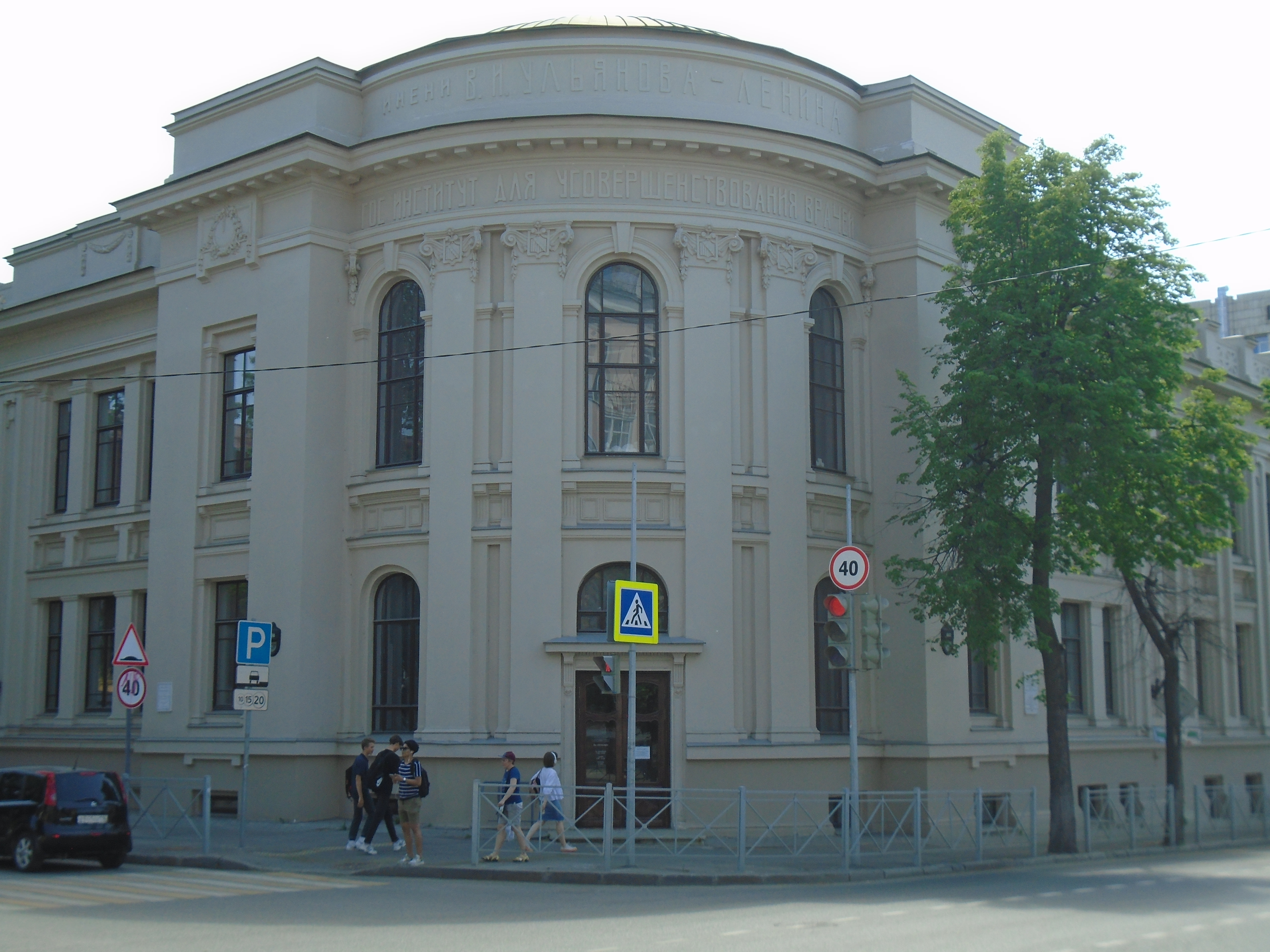
Kazan GIDUV, 2021

In 1920, Klyachkin became head of the physiotherapy department established at the institute's outpatient clinic, and in 1921, he was appointed head of the newly created physiotherapy department. Organizing a physical treatment methods clinic, Klyachkin established one of the first physiatric clinics in the USSR with an inpatient facility, polyclinic, and hydro-mud and electro-phototherapy departments, based on his former hospital. Two basement rooms in the lazaretto of the Kazan Community of Sisters of Mercy of the Russian Red Cross on Bolshaya Krasnaya Street were allocated for the department and clinic. After Klyachkin's appeal to the Bolsheviks he had sheltered in his clinic, the institute moved to the vacant massive building of the former Peasant Land Bank on Gorshechnaya Street. Klyachkin personally oversaw the design, construction, and equipping of the new scientific-methodological center's premises, complete with its own clinic, scientific staff, and training base for doctors. He donated all the equipment from his former clinic to the state for the new facility.

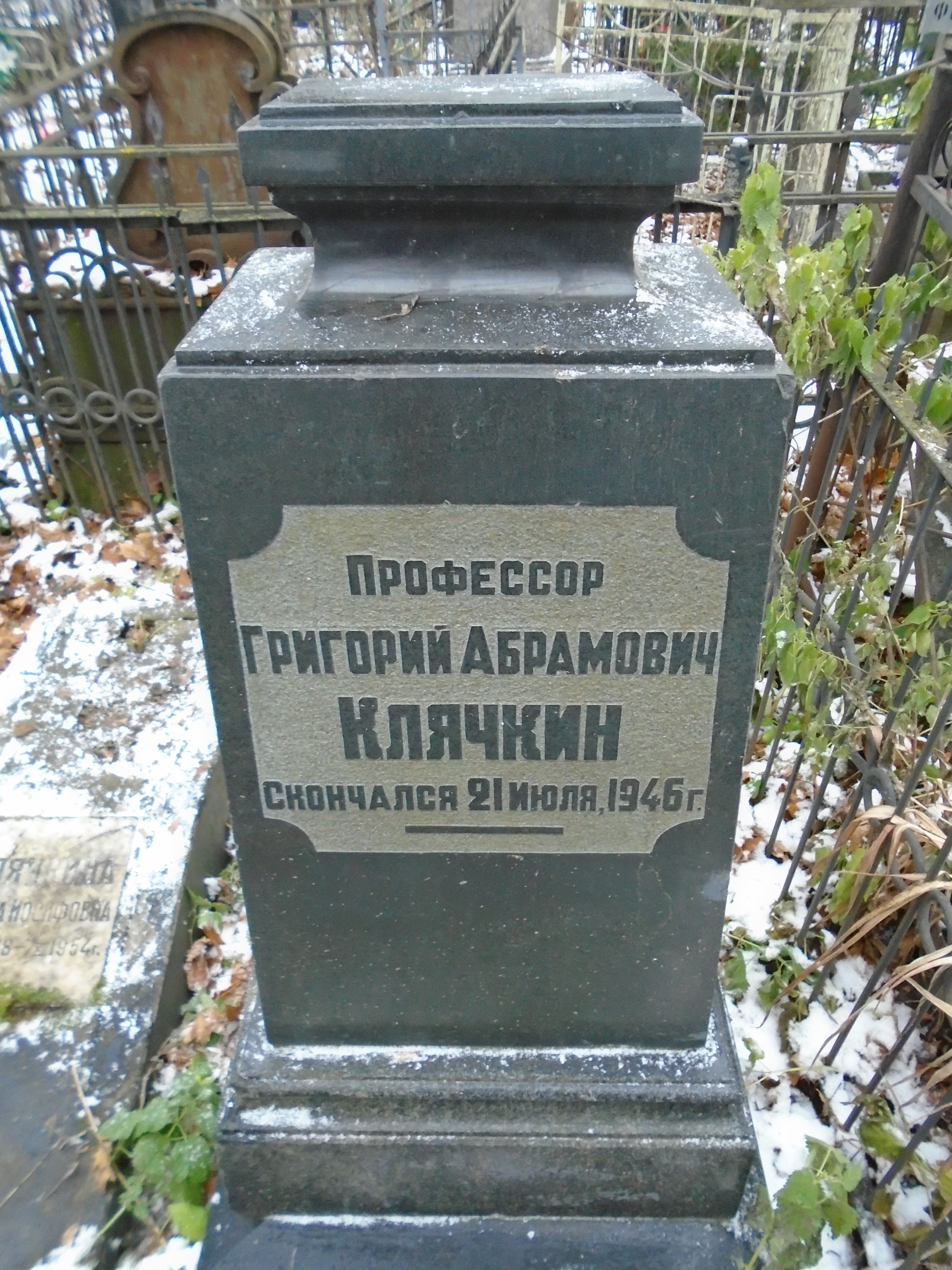
Tombstone at Klyachkin's grave, Arskoe Cemetery, 2020

In 1923, the institute was included among the scientific institutions of the People's Commissariat of Health of the RSFSR as the State Institute for Advanced Medical Training named after V. I. Lenin (GIDUV). In 1925, Klyachkin was elected professor of the GIDUV physiatry department, with a recommendation from Moscow — from Darkshevich. In 1929, the GIDUV council organized a celebration of Klyachkin's 35 years of medical, teaching, and scientific activity, despite his refusal of official festivities.The institute's clinic was in high demand, and Klyachkin saw a constant stream of patients, as in pre-revolutionary times. Nevertheless, he faced denunciations, defending himself by stating he had always only treated people and even helped Bolsheviks.

From 1931 to 1932, alongside his professorial work, Klyachkin, as an associate professor, headed the physiatry course at the Kazan Medical Institute, served as a consultant to the People's Commissariat of Health of Tatarstan, was a member of the Society of Neuropathologists and Psychiatrists at Kazan University, and chaired the physiotherapy section of the Scientific-Medical Association. In 1935, he was reapproved for the same Doctor of Medical Sciences degree by the Committee for Higher Education under the Council of People's Commissars of the USSR. He remained in his post until 1937; then retired; the department was then headed by L. N. Klyachkin. In 1941, he celebrated 50 years of medical and public activity, rightfully considered one of the founders of Kazan's GIDUV, who laid the foundation for organizing all physiotherapy and medical rehabilitation services in Tatarstan.

Grigory Abramovich Klyachkin died on July 21, 1946, in Kazan after a prolonged serious illness.

== See also ==
- Gabdulla Tuqay

== Bibliography ==
- Список почётным и действительным членам Казанского купеческого собрания на 1914 год [The list of honorary and full members of the Kazan merchant assembly for 1914] (in Russian). Казань: Cкоропечатня «Окунь». 1916. p. 16.
- Н. Г. Чернышевский в общественной мысли народов СССР, Pustarnakov (1984). V. F. [N. G. Chernyshevsky in the public thought of the peoples of the USSR] (in Russian). Москва: Издательство «Наука». p. 384.
- Zulkarnaeva, F. M. (1986). Слово о Тукае. Писатели и учёные о татарском народном поэте [Word about Tukay. Writers and scientists about the Tatar folk poet] (in Russian). Казань: Татарское книжное издательство. p. 430.
- Smykov, Yu. I. (1993). Республика Татарстан: памятники истории и культуры (каталог-справочник) [Republic of Tatarstan: historical and cultural monuments (catalog-guidebook)] (in Russian). Казань: Издательство «Эйдос». p. 453. ISBN 5858760023.
- Khekhenov, M. Kh. (2002). Клячкин Григорий Абрамович [Grigory Abramovich Klyachkin] (in Tatar). Казан: Академия наук Республики Татарстан. p. 341. ISBN 5902375010.
- Khasanov, M. Kh. (2006). Казань [Kazan] (in Russian). Vol. 3 (К — Л). Казань: Институт Татарской энциклопедии Академии наук Республики Татарстан. pp. 152–171, 324. ISBN 9785852470355.
- Abdullin, Ya. G. (1978). Н.Г. Чернышевский и татарская общественная мысль [N.G. Chernyshevsky and Tatar public thought] (in Russian). Казань: Татарское книжное издательство. p. 64.
- Aksoy, G. G. (2021). Образ врача в современной татарской литературе [The representation of doctor in modern Tatar literature] (in Russian). Казань: Издательство Казанского университета. pp. 143–149. ISSN 2074-0239.
- Akhmetova, D. I. (2016). "Тукай в фотографиях, Фотографы Габдуллы Тукая" [Tuqay in photos, Photographers of Gabdulla Tuqay]. Габдулла Тукай и тюркский мир: материалы международной конференции, посвящённой 130-летию со дня рождения Г. Тукая [Gabdulla Tuqay and the Turkic World: Proceedings of the International Conference on the 130th Anniversary of G. Tuqay's Birth] (in Russian). Казань: Институт языка, литературы и искусства им. Г. Ибрагимова Академии наук Республики Татарстан. pp. 44–48.
- Bikbulatov, R. Kh. (2004). «Народ сам нашёл и выбрал своего певца…». Габдулла Тукай в Казани // Сокровища культуры Татарстана: историческое наследие, культура и искусство [“The people themselves found and chose their own singer...”. Gabdulla Tuqay in Kazan // Cultural Treasures of Tatarstan: Historical Heritage, Culture and Art]. (Наследие народов Российской Федерации: проблемы государственной охраны памятников истории и культуры) (in Russian). Москва: НИИЦентр. pp. 272–276. ISBN 978-5-902156-05-5.
- Gainanova, L. P. (1990). «Четвёртая тетрадь» (новые факты к истории одного сборника Тукая) // Поэт свободы и правды: Материалы всесоюзной научной конференции и юбилейных торжеств, посвящённы 100-летию со дня рождения Г. Тукая [“The fourth workbook” (new facts to the history of one collection of Tuqay) // Poet of freedom and truth: Materials of the All-Union scientific conference and anniversary celebrations dedicated to the 100th anniversary of the birth of G. Tuqay] (in Russian). Казань: Татарское книжное издательство. pp. 204–214. ISBN 5298004253.
- Gainanova, L. P. (2016). Тукай в документах жандармерии (новые факты к истории одного сборника Тукая) // Габдулла Тукай и тюркский мир: материалы международной конференции, посвящённой 130-летию со дня рождения Г. Тукая [Tuqay in the documents of the gendarmerie (new facts to the history of one collection of Tuqay) // Gabdulla Tuqay and the Turkic world: materials of the international conference dedicated to the 130th anniversary of the birth of G. Tuqay] (in Russian). Казань: Институт языка, литературы и искусства им. Г. Ибрагимова Академии наук Республики Татарстан. pp. 110–117.
- Gainullin, M. Kh. (1948). Тукай — тәнкыйтьче // Габдулла Тукай. Шагыйрьнең тууына алтмыш ел тулуга багышланган гыйльми сессия материаллары: 1886–1946 [Tuqay-critic // Gabdulla Tuqay. Materials of the scientific session devoted to the sixtieth anniversary of the poet's birth: 1886-1946] (in Tatar). Казан: Татгосиздат. pp. 51–93.
- Gainullin, M. Kh. (1966). Татарская литература и публицистика начала XX века [Tatar literature and journalism of the early XX century] (in Russian). Казань: Tаткнигоиздат. p. 435.
- Gainullin, M. Kh. (1983). Татарская литература и публицистика начала XX века [Tatar literature and journalism of the early XX century] (in Russian). Казань: Татарское книжное издательство. p. 350.
- Glukhov, M. S. (2002). Казанский ретро-лексикон: Первый опыт родословно-биографической и историко-краеведческой энциклопедии [Kazan retro-lexicon: The first experience of genealogical-biographical and local history encyclopedia] (in Russian). Казань: Основа. p. 575.
- Kazansky, M. V. (1899). Путеводитель по Казани [Kazan Travel Guide] (in Russian). Казань: Типо-литография Императорского университета. p. 298.
- Klyachkina, N. K. (2015). Образ человека и неопределённость // Бехтерев и современная психология человечности (к 130-летию организации первой в России психофизиологической лаборатории в г. Казани): сборник статей V Международной научно-практической конференции, 10—12 сентября 2015 г. [Human image and uncertainty // Bekhterev and modern psychology of humanity (to the 130th anniversary of the organization of the first psychophysiological laboratory in Russia in Kazan): collection of articles of the V International Scientific and Practical Conference] (PDF) (in Russian). Казань: Отечество. pp. 178–183.
- Klyachkina, N. L. (2012). Психотерапевты и психоаналитики Казани на рубеже XIX–XX веков // Московский Международный конгресс, посвящённый 110-летию со дня рождения А. Р. Лурия: тезисы сообщений [Psychotherapists and psychoanalysts of Kazan at the turn of XIX-XX centuries // Moscow International Congress dedicated to the 110th anniversary of the birth of A. R. Luria: abstracts] (in Russian). М.: Факультет психологии МГУ имени М. В. Ломоносова. p. 74. ISBN 9785756706697.
- Laisova, N. Kh. (1985). Габдулла Тукай (К столетию со дня рождения) [Gabdulla Tuqay (On the centenary of his birth)] (in Russian). Казань: Татарское книжное издательство. p. 86.
- Minnegulov, Kh. Yu. (2016). Размышления о Тукае // Габдулла Тукай и тюркский мир: материалы международной конференции, посвящённой 130-летию со дня рождения Г. Тукая [Reflections on Tuqay // Gabdulla Tuqay and the Turkic World: Proceedings of the International Conference on the 130th Anniversary of the Birth of G. Tuqay] (in Russian). Казань: Институт языка, литературы и искусства им. Г. Ибрагимова Академии наук Республики Татарстан. pp. 258–264.
- Mikhailov, N. K. (2006). Казанская государственная медицинская академия [Kazan State Medical Academy] (in Russian). Vol. 3 (К — Л). Казань: Институт Татарской энциклопедии Академии наук Республики Татарстан. pp. 46–47. ISBN 9785852470355.
- Nurullin, I. Z. (1977). Тукай [Tuqay]. Жизнь замечательных людей (in Tatar). М.: Молодая гвардия. p. 236.
- Podolskaya, M. A. (2017a). Невролог и физиотерапевт [Neurologist and physiotherapist] (in Russian). Невроньюс. Новости неврологии: газета. pp. 11–13.
- Podolskaya, M. A. (2017b). Гирш Клячкин — последний врач Тукая [Hirsh Klyachkin - Tukai's last doctor] (in Russian). Наш дом — Татарстан: журнал. pp. 48–55.
- Sadyikov, A. Kh. (2016). Клячкин Григорий Абрамович // Габдулла Тукай: энциклопедия [Klyachkin Grigory Abramovich // Gabdulla Tuqay: encyclopedia] (in Tatar). Казан: Татарстан Республикасы Фәннәр академиясенең Г. Ибраһимов исем. Тел, әдәбият һәм сәнгать институты. pp. 369–370. ISBN 9785930912036.
- Sultanbekov, B. Kh. (2003). Татарстан, XX век: События, документы, публицистика [Tatarstan, XX century: Events, documents, publicism] (in Russian). Vol. 2: События, документы, публицистика. Казань: Татарское республиканское издательство «Хэтер». ISBN 5941131836.
- Tuqay, G. (1992). Избранная проза [Selected prose] (in Russian). Казань: Татарское книжное издательство. p. 126. ISBN 978-5-298-00964-5.
- Faseev, K. F. (1955). Из истории татарской передовой общественной мысли: вторая половина XIX — начало XX века [From the History of Tatar Advanced Public Thought: the Second Half of the XIX - the Beginning of the XX Century] (in Russian). Казань: Таткнигоиздат. p. 278.
- Chugunova, N. S. (2002). Клячкин Григорий (Гирш-Давид) Абрамович // Казанский университет, 1804—2004: Биобиблиографический словарь [Klyachkin Grigory (Hirsh-David) Abramovich // Kazan University, 1804-2004: Biobibliographical Dictionary] (in Russian). Vol. 1: 1804—1904. Казань: Издательство Казанского университета. pp. 241–242. ISBN 5746407429.
