= Koshlauch =

Rural locality in Arça District, Tatarstan

Coordinates: 56°10′N 49°34′E

Koshlauch (Russian: Кошлау́ч; Tatar: Кушлавыч, romanized: Quşlawıç, [quʃlɑˈwɯɕ]) is a village (selo) in Arsky District, Republic of Tatarstan, Russia, located 24 kilometers (15 mi) north-west of Arsk, district's administrative center. The village is situated on the Krasnaya, Kazanka's right tributary. Population: 151 (2000 est.); 137 (1989); all ethnic Tatars. The main occupations of the residents are agriculture and cattle breeding.

The village is known since the Khanate of Kazan epoch. It is the native village of the Tatar poet Ğabdulla Tuqay. The museum is placed in his home.
