= Uchili =

Rural locality in Arça District, Tatarstan

Coordinates: 56°11′N 49°49′E

Uchili (Russian: Учили́; Tatar: Өчиле, [œɕiˈle]) is a village (selo) in Arsky District of the Republic of Tatarstan, Russia, located on the bank of the Berezinka River, 13 kilometers (8.1 mi) south of Arsk, the administrative center of the district. Population: 243 (2000 est.); 224 (1989); all ethnic Tatars. There is a primary school and a club in the village. The main occupation of the population is cattle breeding. There is a club, a secondary school, and a mosque, attributed to the 19th century, in the village.

The village has been known to exist since the 17th century as Malaya Berzinka (Малая Березинка) or Keçe Biräzä (Кече Бирәзә). In the 19th century shoulder-yokes and spindles were produced there. The imam of the village mosque was Zinnätulla Zäynelbäşir ulı, grandfather of Ğabdulla Tuqay, who also lived in Öçile.
