= Masguda Shamsutdinova =

Russian composer

Masguda Islamovna Shamsutdinova
- Мәсгудә Ислам кызы Шәмсетдинова
- Born: June 1, 1955 (age 70); Kshlau-Yelga, Bashkir ASSR
- Education: Kazan State Conservatoire, Tatar History Institute, Saint Petersburg State University
- Occupations: Writer, composer

Masguda Islamovna Shamsutdinova (Tatar: Мәсгудә Ислам кызы Шәмсетдинова, romanized: Mäsğudä İslam qızı Şämsetdinowa; born June 1, 1955, in Kshlau-Yelga, Bashkir ASSR) is a Tatar writer and composer.

== Biography ==
Masguda Shamsutdinova was born in Bashkortostan. She studied music in Kazakhstan and graduated from Kazan State Conservatoire in the Republic of Tatarstan. She continued her studies at the Tatar History Institute and St. Petersburg State University and received a Ph.D. in 2002. The same year Shamsutdinova moved to Seattle, Washington, where she lives and works.

== Honors and awards ==
- 2003 Best Composer, Art-Horde International Theater Festival
- 2002 Best Composer, Nauruz International Theater Festival
- 2000 1st Place, Tatar Theater Festival
- 1994 Best Composer, Tatar Theater Festival
- 1993 Tatarstan Republican Award for contributions to national music
- 1983 Diploma, Romanian Drama Festival in the USSR

== Works ==
Shamsutdinova's compositions are influenced by Tartar folk music. She composes chamber and symphony music, and for film soundtracks. Selected works include:

- Dervish symphonic poem 2006
- Symphony No.3, Genghis-Khan 2004
- Marriage of Geese choral 2001
- Amazons of Tartary 2002
- The Butterfly on the Snow 2002
- Hymn to Prophet Muhammad, Maulid an-Nabi 2006

Shamsutdinova's works have been recorded and issued on media, including:

- Fables from Tartary – CD by CD Express, Issaquah, WA., 2003
- The dedication Audio Tape, Songs and romances, Kazan, Tatarstan, Bars Records, 2001
- Symphonic and Choir music of Tatar composers Leningrad, Melody, 1990
- Music for children of Tatar composers Leningrad, Melody, 1990
- Mehdi – Sufi musical mystery, Leningrad, Melody, 1990

Other publications include:

- 2002 - Music for piano (13 pieces for children), Publisher - Tatarstan Kitap Neshriati
- 2001 – Prophet’s birthday, Kazan, State University Publishing House
- 1999 – Sifted Time (Ilekten ilengen zaman), Ethnography research book, Publisher – Tatarstan President's Publishing House
- 1995 (nr.10), 1997 (nr. 1.) – Swedish music magazine "Music" (Stockholm)
- 1994 (nr.23) - "Kultur ve Sanat" (Turkey, Istanbul)
- 1991 (nr.6.) – Music Magazine "Sovetskaya Muzika" (Moscow)
- 1980-2002 - Songs and romances in Tatar magazines
