= Kazan State Medical University =

University in Kazan, Russia

Kazan State Medical University, Kazan
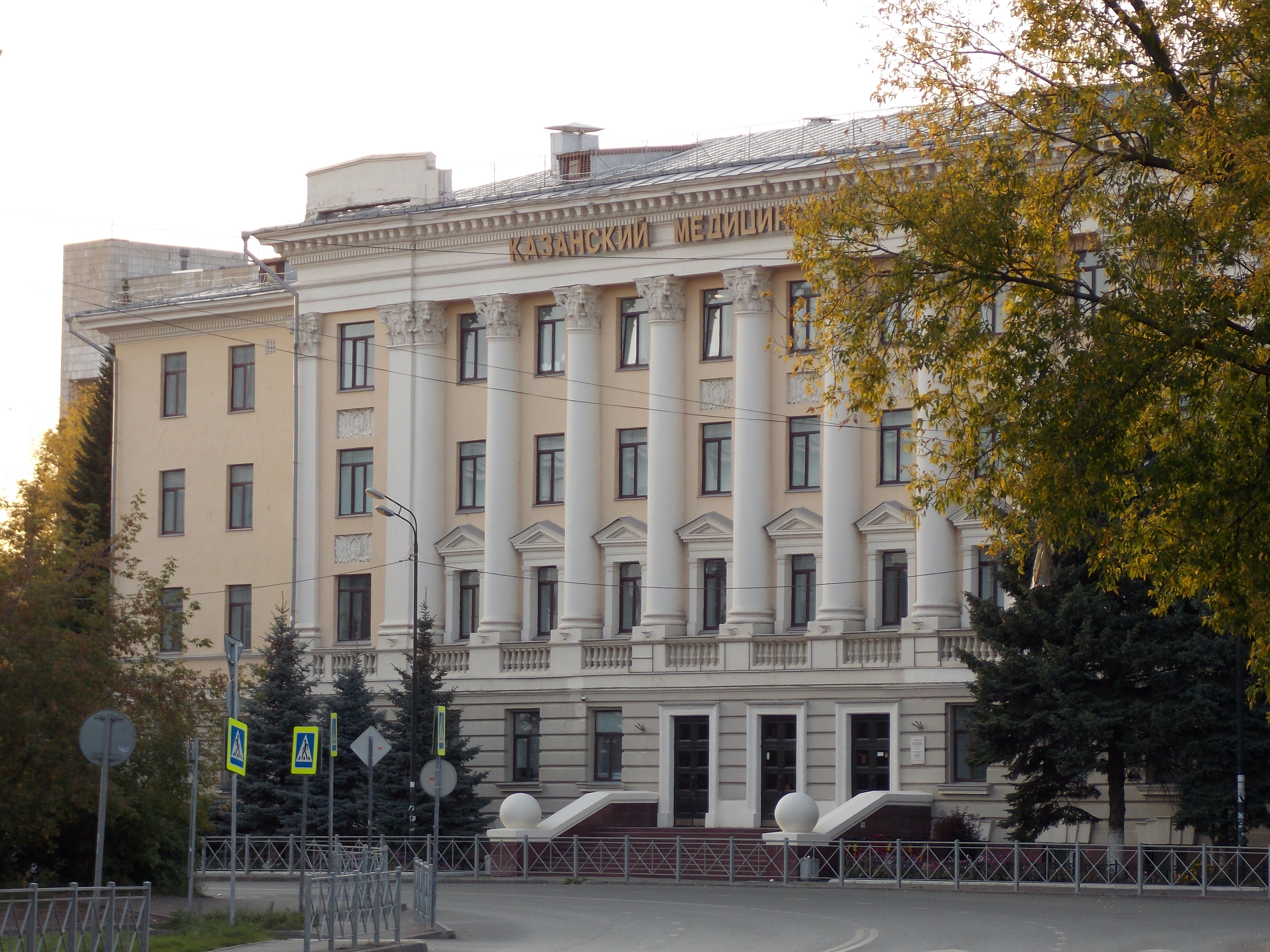
- Main corpus of Kazan State Medical University
- Motto: Omnium profecto artium medicina nobilissima (Latin)
- Type: Public
- Established: 1814; 212 years ago
- Chancellor: Aleksey Sozinov
- Administrative staff: 1,400 (700 academic staff)
- Students: 4,000
- Location: Kazan, Russia; 55°47′26.26″N 49°8′27.23″E
- Campus: urban
- Nickname: KSMU

Kazan Medical University is a multifunctional multilevel state higher medical educational institution that meets the needs of society and the individual in higher medical education, the development of life sciences, and scientific medical knowledge. The date of creation of the Kazan State Medical University (KSMU) is considered to be May 14, 1814, when the first meeting of the council of the medical department of the Imperial Kazan University took place.

By the Decree of the Council of People's Commissars of the RSFSR dated 05.11.1930 No. 132, the educational institution receives the status of an independent institute with medical and sanitary-hygienic faculties. Later, the faculties were opened: pediatric (1932), dental (1956), pharmaceutical (1975), postgraduate education (1993), social work (1991) and management and higher nursing education (1994), for work with foreign students (2014) and biomedical (2014). Among the graduates of the Kazan Medical School are more than 30 academicians and corresponding members of the Academy of Sciences and the Academy of Medical Sciences of Russia. April 24, 1994, Kazan State Medical Institute received university status.

== Rankings and reputation ==
According to the Academic Ranking of World Universities—European Standard ARES-2014, published by the European Scientific-Industrial Chamber, Kazan State Medical University (KSMU) was ranked third among medical universities in Russia. KSMU holds the position of 4489 in the Webometrics Ranking of World Universities and is ranked 5868 in the uniRank.org World University Ranking.

== Geography and location ==
Kazan State Medical University (KSMU) is situated in the central area of Kazan in Russia.

== Teaching system ==
Kazan State Medical University (KSMU) offers curricula for general medicine, dentistry, pediatrics, nursing and pharmacy.

== History ==
In 1804, Emperor Alexander I issued a royal command to establish a university in Kazan.

In 1814, the Faculty of Medicine was inaugurated at Kazan Emperor University.

In 1837, the Anatomical Theater, a distinctive example of Russian classicism from the 19th century, was constructed based on the design of Italian anatomical theaters from the Renaissance period. The project was led by M.P. Korinfskiyi with the participation of Nikolai Lobachevsky, the rector of Kazan Emperor's University.

In 1840, the university clinic was established.

In 1930, the Medical Faculty of Kazan State University underwent reorganization and became the Kazan Medical Institute.

On April 29, 1994, Kazan Medical Institute attained the status of Kazan State Medical University.
