= List of rural localities in Tatarstan =

Map of Russia with Tatarstan highlighted

This is a list of rural localities in Tatarstan. The Republic of Tatarstan is a federal subject of Russia (a republic) located in the Volga Federal District. Its capital is the city of Kazan, which is one of Russia's larger and more prosperous cities. The republic borders with Kirov, Ulyanovsk, Samara, and Orenburg Oblasts, and with the Mari El, Udmurt, and Chuvash Republics, as well as with the Republic of Bashkortostan. The unofficial Tatarstan motto is: Bez Buldırabız! (We can!).

== Agryzsky District ==
Rural localities in Agryzsky District:

- Äzi
- Dewäternä
- İj-Bäyki
- İsänbay
- İske Esläk
- Kiçketañ
- Qadıbaş
- Qırındı
- Qodaş
- Salağış
- Şarşadı
- Täbärle
- Tirsä
- Tübän Köçek
- Urazay
- Ütägän
- Yamorza
- Yaña Aqxuca
- Yañawıl

== Aktanyshsky District ==
Rural localities in Aktanyshsky District:

- Äcäkül
- Aday
- Aktanysh
- Änäk
- Aqküz
- Aqtanışbaş
- Axun
- Ayış
- Buazkül
- Çalmanarat
- Çuraqay
- İske Äğbäz
- İske Baysar
- İske Boğadı
- İske Qormaş
- İske Säfär
- İske Teläkäy
- Kücäkä
- Mäsäde
- Olı İmän
- Puçı
- Qaçqın
- Quyan
- Staroye Aymanovo
- Taqtalaçıq
- Tatar Yamalısı
- Tüke
- Urazay
- Usı
- Yaña Qormaş
- Yuğarı Yaxşıy
- Zöbäyer

== Alkeyevsky District ==
Rural localities in Alkeyevsky District:

- Bazarnye Mataki
- Yuxmaçı

== Almetyevsky District ==
Rural localities in Almetyevsky District:

- Abdrakhmanovo
- Miñlebay

== Apastovsky District ==
Rural localities in Apastovsky District:

- Älmändär

== Arsky District ==
Rural localities in Arsky District:

- Apaz
- Aqçişmä
- Aşıtbaş
- Aywan
- Aywan
- Baykal
- Çikänäs
- Çulpan
- Göberçäk
- İske Aşıt
- İske Çürile
- İske İäbaş
- İske Kişet
- İske Qırlay
- Koshlauch
- Küperbaş
- Mämsä
- Mircäm
- Möndeş
- Murali
- Nalasa
- Nosı
- Ornaşbaş
- Pöşäñgär
- Qazanbaş
- Qursa
- Qursa Poçmaq
- Särdäbaş
- Şekä
- Sörde
- Şura
- Şurabaş
- Şuşmabaş
- Taşkiçü
- Töbäk-Çoqırça
- Tübän Atı
- Tübän Mätäskä
- Tübän Orı
- Tübän Poşalım
- Tübän Qursa
- Uchili
- Ürnäk
- Urta Biräzä
- Urta Qursa
- Urta Särdä
- Utar-Atı
- Yaña Çürlie
- Yaña İäbaş
- Yana Kishet
- Yaña Qırlay
- Yañasala
- Yuğarı Atı
- Yuğarı Biräzä
- Yuğarı Buca
- Yuğarı Mätäskä
- Yuğarı Poşalım
- Zur Biräzä

== Atninsky District ==
Rural localities in Atninsky District:

- Arı
- Ayshiyaz
- Baxtaçı
- Bäxtiyar
- Cilgelde
- Çımbulat
- Çişmäle Sap
- Dusım
- İske Coğıp
- İske Öcem
- İske Mäñgär
- İske Şimber
- Keçe Ätnä
- Külle Kime
- Küäm
- Küñgär
- Küşär
- Mamış
- Märcän
- Möndeş
- Muqşı
- Olı Bäräzä
- Olı Mäñgär
- Olı Öşkätä
- Qayınsar
- Qazaq Ürtäme
- Qışlaw
- Qızıl Utar
- Qomırğuca
- Şäkänäç
- Taşçişmä
- Töreklär
- Tübän Bäräskä
- Tübän Köyek
- Tübän Şaşı
- Yapançı
- Yaña Ätnä
- Yaña Bäräskä
- Yaña Cölbi
- Yaña Öcem
- Yaña Şaşı
- Yaña Şimber
- Yuğarı Köyek
- Yuğarı Särdä
- Yuğarı Şaşı

== Aznakayevsky District ==
Rural localities in Aznakayevsky District:

- Tımıtıq

== Baltasinsky District ==
Rural localities in Baltasinsky District:

- Arbaş
- Ätnä
- Bornaq
- Börbaş
- Börbaş Särdegäne
- Çapşar
- Çepyä
- Çutay
- İske Salawıç
- Kenäbaş
- Kili
- Köşkätbaş
- Norma
- Nönägär
- Or
- Pıjmara
- Qaraduğan
- Qarile
- Qunır
- Salawıç Särdegäne
- Şeñşeñär
- Smäil
- Şoda
- Tübän Kenä
- Tübän Sasna
- Tübän Uşma
- Tüntär
- Yaña Salawıç
- Yañğul
- Yuğarı Subaş
- Yuğarı Şuban

== Bugulminsky District ==
Rural localities in Bugulminsky District:

- Batır
- Dimeskäy
- Naratlı
- Qodaş
- Tallı Büläk

== Cheremshansky District ==
Rural localities in Cheremshansky District:

- Cheremshan

== Drozhzhanovsky District ==
Rural localities in Drozhzhanovsky District:

- Malaya Tsilna
- Staroye Drozhzhanoye

== Kamsko-Ustyinsky District ==
Rural localities in Kamsko-Ustyinsky District:

- Syukeyevo

== Kaybitsky District ==
Rural localities in Kaybitsky District:

- Afanas
- Bärlebaşı
- Baymorza
- Bolshiye Kaybitsy
- Bolshoe Podberezye
- Borındıq
- Çükri Alan
- Çüti
- İmänle Bortas
- İske Bua
- İske Tärbit
- Keçe Qaybıç
- Keçe Ursaq
- Mälki
- Morza Bärlebaşı
- Murali
- Olı Tärbit
- Olı Ursaq
- Qamıllı
- Qolañğı
- Qoşman
- Quşkül
- Saltığan
- Sorawıl
- Starye Chechkaby
- Şüşirmä
- Ursaq forestry's settlement
- Xuca Xäsän
- Yaña Bua

== Kukmorsky District ==
Rural localities in Kukmorsky District:

- Aday
- Aş-Buci
- Äsän-Yılğa
- Balıqlı
- Baylanğar
- Bitlänger
- Buçirmä
- Çişmäbaş
- Käçimir
- Kärkäüç
- Kinderkül
- Kükşel
- Mämäşir
- Manzaras
- Ölge
- Olıyaz
- Porşur
- Qamışlı
- Qayınsar
- Qupqa
- Särdekbaş
- Saztamaq
- Taşlı Yılğa
- Tatar Tollısı
- Törkäş
- Tübän Öskebaş
- Tübän Şämärdän
- Tuyımbaş
- Üräsbaş
- Urazay
- Yädegär
- Yaña Särdek
- Yañil
- Yansıbı
- Yuğarı Arbaş
- Yuğarı Çura
- Yuğarı Şön
- Zur Kukmara
- Zur Särdek

== Laishevsky District ==
Rural localities in Laishevsky District:

- İmänkiskä
- Siñgel

== Leninogorsky District ==
Rural localities in Leninogorsky District:

- Shugurovo

== Mamadyshsky District ==
Rural localities in Mamadyshsky District:

- Albay
- Alğay
- Aqman
- Basqan
- Börset-Suqaçı
- Çiäbaş
- Düsmät
- İske Qomazan
- İske Çäbiä
- İşki
- Keçe Kirmän
- Kömeşkül
- Köyek-Yırıqsa
- Olıyaz
- Qatmış
- Şädçe
- Şämäk
- Tübän Qozğınçı
- Tübän Täkäneş
- Tübän Uşma
- Tübän Yäke
- Urazbaxtı
- Urta Kirmän
- Üsäli
- Yaña Qomazan
- Yuğarı Qıyarlı
- Yuğarı Son
- Yuğarı Täkäneş
- Yuğarı Uşma

== Mendeleyevsky District ==
Rural localities in Mendeleyevsky District:

- Abalaç
- Bigäş
- Bäzäkä
- İj Tamağı
- Iq Tamağı
- Monay
- Pesäy
- Qamay
- Turay

== Menzelinsky District ==
Rural localities in Menzelinsky District:

- Äträkle
- Ayu
- Bikbaw
- Däwek
- Gölek
- Irıs
- Naratlı Kiçü
- Qädräk
- Tawastı Baylar
- Tawastı Täkermän
- Tulıbay
- Tupaç
- Xucamät
- Yaña Mälkän
- Yuğarı Täkermän

== Muslyumovsky District ==
Rural localities in Muslyumovsky District:

- Ämäkäy
- Muslyumovo

== Novosheshminsky District ==
Rural localities in Novosheshminsky District:

- Novosheshminsk

== Nurlatsky District ==
Rural localities in Nurlatsky District:

- Kichkalnya
- Chuvashsky Timerlek

== Pestrechinsky District ==
Rural localities in Pestrechinsky District:

- Älbädän
- Arışxazda
- Chita
- Keräşen Särdäse
- Kibäç
- Kibäk İle
- Köyek
- Kün
- Lenino-Kokushkino
- Pestretsy
- Pimär
- Qawal
- Shali
- Tatar Tanayı

== Sarmanovsky District ==
Rural localities in Sarmanovsky District:

- Sarmanovo

== Tyulyachinsky District ==
Rural localities in Tyulyachinsky District:

- Tyulyachi

== Verkhneuslonsky District ==
Rural localities in Verkhneuslonsky District:

- Baqçasaray
- Berek
- Mullanur Waxitof isemendäge
- Nariman
- Qızıl Bayraq
- Studenets
- Tatar Maqılı
- Tatar Mämätxucası
- Verkhny Uslon
- Watan
- Yaña Bolğar
- Yaña Yul
- Yoldız

== Vysokogorsky District ==
Rural localities in Vysokogorsky District:

- Äblä
- Alan-Bäksär
- Alat
- Äldermeş
- Apsabaş
- Äsän
- Ayaz İle
- Aybaş
- Baykal
- Biektaw
- Biknarat
- Börele
- Börele animal farm settlement
- Çämäk
- Çıpçıq
- Çırşı
- Çuaş İle
- Çubar
- Döbyaz
- İneş
- Keçe Bitaman
- Keçe Qawal
- Keçe Räs
- Keçe Solabaş
- Kinderle
- Külle
- Macar
- Matmır
- Mämdäl
- Naratlıq
- Öbrä
- Ölä
- Olı Bitaman
- Olı Köyek
- Olı Qawal
- Olı Räs
- Olı Solabaş
- Olıyaz
- Ömbe
- Önsä
- Qarakül
- Qayınlıq
- Qazaqlar
- Qodaş
- Qondırlı
- Qorqaçıq
- Qorqaçıq railway junction settlement
- Qızıl Şäreq
- Qızılkül
- Şäpşe
- Saya
- Şiğäli
- Şıpşıyıq
- Suıqsu
- Tatar Ayshase
- Tatar Urmatı
- Taşlı Qawal
- Taşsu
- Tornayaz
- Tuqtamış
- Urmançı
- Urta Alat
- Urıs-Tatar Äyşäse
- Usad
- Yamaşirmä
- Yañawıl
- Yurtış
- Yuwas
- Yäş Köç
- Zheleznodorozhnoy stantsii Vysokaya Gora

== Zelenodolsky District ==
Rural localities in Zelenodolsky District:

- Aqyeget
- Aydar
- Äyşä
- Baqırçı
- Bişnä
- Gruzinsky
- Kügäy
- Kügeş
- Mamadış-Äkil
- Mulla İle
- Olı Açasır
- Olı Cäke
- Olı Klüçä
- Olı Külbaş
- Olı Qarağuca
- Olı Şırdan
- Qaratmän
- Qızılyar
- Sviyazhsk
- Tatar Tanayı

== See also ==
- Lists of rural localities in Russia
