= Yaña Çürlie =

Yaña Çürlie Яңа Чүриле
- selo
- Location within Tatarstan
- Country: Russia
- Region: Tatarstan
- District: Arça District
- Municipality: Sece rural settlement
- Time zone: UTC+3:00

Yaña Çürlie (Tatar: Яңа Чүриле, romanized: Yaña Çürlie) is a rural locality (a selo) in Arça District, Tatarstan. The population was 580 as of 2010. Yaña Çürlie is located 30 km from Arçа, district's administrative centre, and 94 km from Ԛazаn, republic's capital, by road. The village was established in 18th century. There are 2 streets in the village.
