= Utar-Atı =

Utar-Atı Утар-Аты
- selo
- Location within Tatarstan
- Country: Russia
- Region: Tatarstan
- District: Arça District
- Municipality: Utar-Atı rural settlement
- Time zone: UTC+3:00

Utar-Atı (Tatar: Утар-Аты, romanized: Utar-Atı) is a rural locality (a selo) in Arça District, Tatarstan. The population was 307 as of 2010. Utar-Atı is located 16 km from Arça, district's administrative centre, and 70 km from Ԛazаn, republic's capital, by road. The earliest known record of the settlement dates from 1678. There are 5 streets in the village.
