= Däwek =

Däwek Дәвек
- derevnya
- Location within Tatarstan
- Country: Russia
- Region: Tatarstan
- District: Minzälä District
- Time zone: UTC+3:00

Däwek (Tatar: Дәвек, romanized: Däwek) is a rural locality (a derevnya) in Minzälä District, Tatarstan. The population was 337 as of 2010. Däwek is located 14 km from Minzälä, district's administrative centre, and 283 km from Qazаn, republic's capital, by road. The earliest known record of the settlement dates from 1717. There are 11 streets in the village.
