= Pıjmara =

Pıjmara Пыжмара
- selo
- Location within Tatarstan
- Country: Russia
- Region: Tatarstan
- District: Baltaç District
- Time zone: UTC+3:00

Pıjmara (Tatar: Пыжмара, romanized: Pıjmara) is a rural locality (a selo) in Baltaç District, Tatarstan. The population was 402 as of 2010. Pıjmara is located 32 km from Baltaç, district's administrative centre, and 135 km from Ԛazаn, republic's capital, by road. The village was established in 17th century. There are 4 streets in the village.
