= Urta Alat =

Urta Alat Урта Алат
- derevnya
- Location within Tatarstan
- Country: Russia
- Region: Tatarstan
- District: Biektaw District
- Time zone: UTC+3:00

Urta Alat (Tatar: Урта Алат, romanized: Urta Alat) is a rural locality (a derevnya) in Biektaw District, Tatarstan. The population was 323 as of 2010. Urta Alat is located 32 km north of Biektaw, district's administrative centre, and 57 km north of Qazan, republic's capital, by road. The earliest known record of the settlement dates from 1646. It forms part of the district since 1965. There are 8 streets in the village.
