= Aqman =

Aqman Акман
- derevnya
- Location within Tatarstan
- Country: Russia
- Region: Tatarstan
- District: Mamadış District
- Time zone: UTC+3:00

Aqman (Tatar: Акман, romanized: Aqman) is a rural locality (a derevnya) in Mamadış District, Tatarstan. The population was 257 as of 2010. Aqman is located 17 km from Mаmadış, district's administrative centre, and 187 km from Ԛazаn, republic's capital, by road. The village was established in 18th century. There are 3 streets in the village.
