= Salağış =

Salağış Салагыш
- selo
- Location within Tatarstan
- Country: Russia
- Region: Tatarstan
- District: Ägerce District

Population (2015)
  - Total: 497
- Time zone: UTC+3:00

Salağış (Tatar: Салагыш, romanized: Salağış) is a rural locality (a selo) in Ägerce District, Tatarstan. The population was 623 as of 2010. Salağış is located 73 km from Ägerce, district's administrative centre, and 328 km from Ԛazan, republic's capital, by road. The village was established in 16th or 17th century. There are 6 streets in the village.
