= Çiäbaş =

Çiäbaşı Чиябашы
- selo
- Location within Tatarstan
- Country: Russia
- Region: Tatarstan
- District: Mamadış District
- Municipality: Çiäbaş rural settlement
- Time zone: UTC+3:00

Çiäbaş (Tatar: Чиябаш, romanized: Çiäbaş) is a rural locality (a selo) in Mamadış District, Tatarstan. The population was 324 as of 2010. Çiäbaş is located 40 km from Mamаdış, district's administrative centre, and 137 km from Ԛazаn, republic's capital, by road. The earliest known record of the settlement dates from 1646. There are 4 streets in the village.
