= Qunır =

Qunır Куныр
- selo
- Location within Tatarstan
- Country: Russia
- Region: Tatarstan
- District: Baltaç District
- Time zone: UTC+3:00

Qunır (Tatar: Куныр, romanized: Qunır) is a rural locality (a selo) in Baltaç District, Tatarstan. The population was 869 as of 2010. Qunır is located 36 km from Baltaç, district's administrative centre, and 142 km from Ԛazаn, republic's capital, by road. Qunir is one of the oldest settlements in the region, with records dating back to 619. The village has four streets.
