= Börbaş =

Börbaş Бөрбаш
- selo
- Location within Tatarstan
- Country: Russia
- Region: Tatarstan
- District: Baltaç District
- Municipality: Börbaş Rural Settlement

Population (2010)
  - Total: 869
- Time zone: UTC+3:00

Börbaş (Tatar: Бөрбаш, romanized: Börbaş) is a rural locality (a selo) in Baltaç District, Tatarstan. The population was 893 as of 2010. Börbaş is located 15 km from Baltaç, district's administrative centre, and 116 km from Ԛazаn, republic's capital, by road. The village was established in 17th century. There are 11 streets in the village.
