= Yañğul =

Yañğul Яңгул
- selo
- Location within Tatarstan
- Country: Russia
- Region: Tatarstan
- District: Baltaç District
- Time zone: UTC+3:00

Yañğul (Tatar: Яңгул, romanized: Yañğul) is a rural locality (a selo) in Baltaç District, Tatarstan. The population was 1085 as of 2010. Yañğul is located 15 km from Baltаç, district's administrative centre, and 117 km from Ԛazаn, republic's capital, by road. The earliest known record of the settlement dates from 1602/1603. There are 13 streets in the village.
