= İske İäbaş =

İske İäbaş Иске Иябаш
- derevnya
- Location within Tatarstan
- Country: Russia
- Region: Tatarstan
- District: Arça District
- Municipality: İske Qırlay rural settlement
- Time zone: UTC+3:00

İske İäbaş (Tatar: Иске Иябаш, romanized: İske İäbaş) is a rural locality (a derevnya) in Arça District, Tatarstan. The population was 228 as of 2010. İske İäbaş is located 13 km from Arça, district's administrative centre, and 83 km from Ԛazаn, republic's capital, by road. The earliest known record of the settlement dates from 1678. There are 4 streets in the village.
