= Käçimir =

Käçimir Кәчимир
- derevnya
- Location within Tatarstan
- Country: Russia
- Region: Tatarstan
- District: Kukmara District
- Time zone: UTC+3:00

Käçimir (Tatar: Кәчимир, romanized: Käçimir) is a rural locality (a derevnya) in Kukmara District, Tatarstan. The population was 364 as of 2010. Käçimir is located 5 km from Kukmara, district's administrative centre, and 152 km from Ԛazan, republic's capital, by road. The village was established in 17th century. There are 6 streets in the village.
