= Tuktamysh =

Tuktamysh Туктамыш
- Village
- Location within Tatarstan
- Country: Russia
- Region: Tatarstan
- District: Vysokogorsky District
- Time zone: UTC+3:00

Tuktamysh (Tatar: Туктамыш, romanized: Tuqtamış; Russian: Туктамыш) is a rural locality (a village) in Vysokogorsky District, Tatarstan, Russia. The population was 108 as of 2010.

Tuktamysh is located 25 kilometres (16 mi) northeast of Vysokaya Gora, the district's administrative centre, and 51 kilometres (32 mi) north of Kazan, the republic's capital, by road. The earliest known record of the settlement dates from 1599. It forms part of the district since 1965.

There are three streets in the village.
