= Saztamaq =

Saztamaq Сазтамак
- derevnya
- Location within Tatarstan
- Country: Russia
- Region: Tatarstan
- District: Kukmara District
- Municipality: Kukmorsky District
- Time zone: UTC+3:00

Saztamaq (Tatar: Сазтамак, romanized: Saztamaq) is a rural locality (a derevnya) in Kukmara District, Tatarstan. The population was 300 as of 2010. Saztamaq is located 10 km from Kukmara, district's administrative centre, and 148 km from Ԛazan, republic's capital, by road. The earliest known record of the settlement dates from 1719. There are 3 streets in the village.
