= Çuraqay =

Çuraqay Чуракай
- selo
- Location within Tatarstan
- Country: Russia
- Region: Tatarstan
- District: Aqtanış District
- Municipality: Aktanyshsky District
- Time zone: UTC+3:00

Çuraqay (Tatar: Чуракай, romanized: Çuraqay) is a rural locality (a selo) in Aqtanış District, Tatarstan. The population was 452 as of 2010. Çuraqay is located 40 km from Aqtanış, district's administrative centre, and 355 km from Qazan, republic's capital, by road. The earliest known record of the settlement dates from 1711. There are 2 streets in the village.
