= Aqtanışbaş =

Aqtanışbaş Актанышбаш
- derevnya
- Location within Tatarstan
- Country: Russia
- Region: Tatarstan
- Time zone: UTC+3:00

Aqtanışbaş (Tatar: Актанышбаш, romanized: Aqtanışbaş) is a rural locality (a derevnya) in Aqtanış District, Tatarstan. The population was 370 as of 2010. Aqtanışbaş is located 3 km from Aqtanış, district's administrative centre, and 356 km from Qazan, republic's capital, by road. The earliest known record of the settlement dates from 1744. There are 2 streets in the village.
