= Naratlıq, Vysokogorsky District =

Naratlıq Наратлык
- derevnya
- Location within Tatarstan
- Country: Russia
- Region: Tatarstan
- District: Biektaw District
- Time zone: UTC+3:00

Naratlıq (Tatar: Наратлык, romanized: Naratlıq) is a rural locality (a derevnya) in Biektaw District, Tatarstan. The population was 182 as of 2010.

== Geography ==
Naratlıq is located 44 km (27 mi) northwest of Biektaw, district's administrative centre, and 78 km (48 mi) north of Qazan, republic's capital, by road.

== History ==
The village was established in 1988.

Since its establishment is a part of Biektaw district.
