= Kügäy =

Kügäy Күгәй
- selo
- Location within Tatarstan
- Country: Russia
- Region: Tatarstan
- District: Yäşel Üzän District
- Time zone: UTC+3:00

Kügäy (Tatar: Күгәй, romanized: Kügäy) is a rural locality (a selo) in Yäşel Üzän District, Tatarstan. The population was 412 as of 2010. Kügäy is located 35 km from Yäşel Üzän, district's administrative centre, and 84 km from Qazan, republic's capital, by road. The earliest known record of the settlement dates from 1647/1651. There are 12 streets in the village.
