= Kinderkül =

Kinderkül Киндеркүл
- derevnya
- Location within Tatarstan
- Country: Russia
- Region: Tatarstan
- District: Kukmara District
- Time zone: UTC+3:00

Kinderkül (Tatar: Киндеркүл, romanized: Kinderkül) is a rural locality (a derevnya) in Kukmara District, Tatarstan. The population was 398 as of 2010. Kinderkül is located 4 km from Kukmara, district's administrative centre, and 148 km from Ԛazan, republic's capital, by road. The village was established in 17th century. There are 10 streets in the village.
