= Taşkiçü, Arsky District =

Taşkiçü Ташкичү
- selo
- Location within Tatarstan
- Country: Russia
- Region: Tatarstan
- District: Arça District
- Municipality: Taşkiçü rural settlement
- Time zone: UTC+3:00

Taşkiçü (Tatar: Ташкичү, romanized: Taşkiçü) is a rural locality (a selo) in Arça District, Tatarstan. The population was 395 as of 2010. Taşkiçü, Arsky District is located 33 km from Arça, district's administrative centre, and 92 km from Ԛazаn, republic's capital, by road. The earliest known record of the settlement dates from 1678. There are 4 streets in the village.
