= Kärkäüç =

Kärkäüç Кәркәүч
- selo
- Location within Tatarstan
- Country: Russia
- Region: Tatarstan
- District: Kukmara District
- Time zone: UTC+3:00

Kärkäüç (Tatar: Кәркәүч, romanized: Kärkäüç) is a rural locality (a selo) in Kukmara District, Tatarstan. The population was 354 as of 2010. Kärkäüç is located 24 km from Kukmarа, district's administrative centre, and 168 km from Ԛаzan, republic's capital, by road. The earliest known record of the settlement dates from 1710/1711. There are 4 streets in the village.
