= Yaña Qormaş =

Yaña Qormaş Яңа Кормаш
- selo
- Location within Tatarstan
- Country: Russia
- Region: Tatarstan
- District: Aqtanış District
- Time zone: UTC+3:00

Yaña Qormaş (Tatar: Яңа Кормаш, romanized: Yaña Qormaş) is a rural locality (a selo) in Aqtanış District, Tatarstan. The population was 423 as of 2010. Yaña Qormaş is located 24 km from Aqtanış, district's administrative centre, and 351 km from Qazan, republic's capital, by road. The village was established in 19th century. There are 3 streets in the village.
