= İske Boğadı =

İske Boğadı Иске Богады
- selo
- Location within Tatarstan
- Country: Russia
- Region: Tatarstan
- District: Aqtanış District
- Time zone: UTC+3:00

İske Boğadı (Tatar: Иске Богады, romanized: İske Boğadı) is a rural locality (a selo) in Aqtanış District, Tatarstan. The population was 627 as of 2010. İske Boğadı is located 18 km from Aqtanış, district's administrative centre, and 362 km from Qazan, republic's capital, by road. The village was established in 17th century. There are 1 streets in the village.
