= Äsän-Yılğa =

Äsän-Yılğa Әсән-Елга
- derevnya
- Location within Tatarstan
- Country: Russia
- Region: Tatarstan
- District: Kukmara District
- Municipality: Mamadysh Uyezd
- Time zone: UTC+3:00

Äsän-Yılğa (Tatar: Әсән-Елга, romanized: Äsän-Yılğa) is a rural locality (a derevnya) in Kukmara District, Tatarstan. The population was 375 as of 2010. Äsän-Yılğa is located 9 km from Kukmara, district's administrative centre, and 145 km from Ԛazan, republic's capital, by road. The earliest known record of the settlement dates from 1678. There are 3 streets in the village.
