= Töbäk-Çoqırça =

Töbäk-Çoqırça Төбәк-Чокырча
- selo
- Location within Tatarstan
- Country: Russia
- Region: Tatarstan
- District: Arça District
- Municipality: Arça urban settlement
- Time zone: UTC+3:00

Töbäk-Çoqırça (Tatar: Төбәк-Чокырча, romanized: Töbäk-Çoqırça) is a rural locality (a selo) in Arça District, Tatarstan. The population was 677 as of 2010. Töbäk-Çoqırça is located 3 km from Arça, district's administrative centre, and 67 km from Ԛazаn, republic's capital, by road. The village was established in 1940 by merging two villages (Töbäk and Çoqırça) into one. There are 15 streets in the village.
