= Tüntär =

Tüntär Түнтәр
- selo
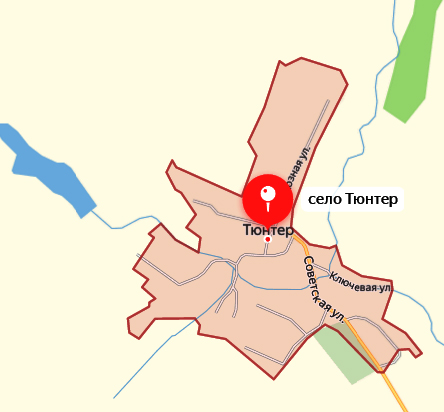
- Map of Tüntär

- Location within Tatarstan
- Country: Russia
- Region: Tatarstan
- District: Baltaç District
- Time zone: UTC+3:00

Tüntär (Tatar: Түнтәр, romanized: Tüntär) is a rural locality (a selo) in Baltaç District, Tatarstan. The population was 591 as of 2010. Tüntär is located 16 km from Bаltaç, district's administrative centre, and 120 km from Ԛazаn, republic's capital, by road. The earliest known record of the settlement dates from 1678. There are 7 streets in the village.
