= Üsäli =

Üsäli Үсәли
- selo
- Location within Tatarstan
- Country: Russia
- Region: Tatarstan
- District: Mamadış District
- Time zone: UTC+3:00

Üsäli (Tatar: Үсәли, romanized: Üsäli) is a rural locality (a selo) in Mamadış District, Tatarstan. The population was 501 as of 2010. Üsäli is located 42 km from Mamadış, district's administrative centre, and 124 km from Qazаn, republic's capital, by road. The village was established in 17th century. There are 8 streets in the village.
