= Urazay, Agryzsky District =

Urazay Уразай
- derevnya
- Location within Tatarstan
- Country: Russia
- Region: Tatarstan
- District: Ägerce District

Population (2002)
  - Total: 250
- Time zone: UTC+3:00

Urazay (Tatar: Уразай, romanized: Urazay) is a rural locality (a derevnya) in Ägerce District, Tatarstan. The population was 201 as of 2010. Urazay, Agryzsky District is located 68 km from Ägerce, district's administrative centre, and 324 km from Ԛazan, republic's capital, by road. The village was established in 17th century. There are 2 streets in the village.
