= Balıqlı, Kukmorsky District =

Balıqlı Балыклы
- derevnya
- Location within Tatarstan
- Country: Russia
- Region: Tatarstan
- District: Kukmara District
- Time zone: UTC+3:00

Balıqlı (Tatar: Балыклы, romanized: Balıqlı) is a rural locality (a derevnya) in Kukmara District, Tatarstan. The population was 384 as of 2010. Balıqlı, Kukmorsky District is located 19 km from Kukmara, district's administrative centre, and 138 km from Qazan, republic's capital, by road. The village was established in 17th century. There are 4 streets in the village.
