= Ürnäk, Arsky District =

Ürnäk Үрнәк
- posyolok
- Location within Tatarstan
- Country: Russia
- Region: Tatarstan
- District: Arça District
- Municipality: Ürnäk rural settlement
- Time zone: UTC+3:00

Ürnäk (Tatar: Үрнәк, romanized: Ürnäk) is a rural locality (a posyolok) in Arça District, Tatarstan. The population was 1005 as of 2010. Ürnäk, Arsky District is located 18 km from Arça, district's administrative centre, and 84 km from Ԛazаn, republic's capital, by road. The village was established in 18th century. There are 14 streets in the village.
