= Tübän Kenä =

Tübän Kenä Түбән Кенә
- selo
- Location within Tatarstan
- Country: Russia
- Region: Tatarstan
- District: Baltaç District
- Time zone: UTC+3:00

Tübän Kenä (Tatar: Түбән Кенә, romanized: Tübän Kenä) is a rural locality (a selo) in Baltaç District, Tatarstan. The population was 308 as of 2010. Tübän Kenä is located 12 km from Baltaç, district's administrative centre, and 110 km from Ԛazаn, republic's capital, by road. The earliest known record of the settlement dates from 1678. There are 6 streets in the village.
