= Çulpan, Arsky District =

Çulpan Чулпан
- selo
- Location within Tatarstan
- Country: Russia
- Region: Tatarstan
- District: Arça District
- Municipality: Käçe rural settlement

Population (2010)
  - Total: 191
- Time zone: UTC+3:00

Çulpan (Tatar: Чулпан, romanized: Çulpan) is a rural locality (a selo) in Arça District, Tatarstan. The population was 191 as of 2010. Çulpan, Arsky District is located 7 km from Arça, district's administrative centre, and 58 km from Ԛazаn, republic's capital, by road. The village was established in 18th century. There are 6 streets in the village.
