= Tawastı Baylar =

Tawastı Baylar Тауасты Байлар
- selo
- Location within Tatarstan
- Country: Russia
- Region: Tatarstan
- District: Minzälä District
- Time zone: UTC+3:00

Tawastı Baylar (Tatar: Тауасты Байлар, romanized: Tawastı Baylar) is a rural locality (a selo) in Minzälä District, Tatarstan. The population was 417 as of 2010. Tawastı Baylar is located 8 km from Minzälä, district's administrative centre, and 294 km from Qazаn, republic's capital, by road. The earliest known record of the settlement dates from 1815. There are 14 streets in the village.
