= Yuxmaçı =

Yuxmaçı Юхмачы
- selo
- Location within Tatarstan
- Country: Russia
- Region: Tatarstan
- District: Älki District
- Municipality: Alkeyevsky District
- Time zone: UTC+3:00

Yuxmaçı (Tatar: Юхмачы, romanized: Yuxmaçı) is a rural locality (a selo) in Älki District, Tatarstan. The population was 771 as of 2010. Yuxmaçı is located 35 km from Bazаrlı Mataq, district's administrative centre, and 171 km from Ԛazаn, republic's capital, by road. The earliest known record of the settlement dates from 1698. There are 8 streets in the village.
