= Sörde =

Sörde Сөрде
- selo
- Location within Tatarstan
- Country: Russia
- Region: Tatarstan
- District: Arça District
- Municipality: Yaña Kenär rural settlement
- Time zone: UTC+3:00

Sörde (Tatar: Сөрде, romanized: Sörde) is a rural locality (a selo) in Arça District, Tatarstan. The population was 334 as of 2010. Sörde is located 44 km from Arça, district's administrative centre, and 96 km from Ԛazаn, republic's capital, by road. The village was established in 18th century. There are 4 streets in the village.
