= Yaña İäbaş =

Yaña İäbaş Яңа Иябаш
- selo
- Location within Tatarstan
- Country: Russia
- Region: Tatarstan
- District: Arça District
- Municipality: Yaña Qırlay rural settlement
- Time zone: UTC+3:00

Yaña İäbaş (Tatar: Яңа Иябаш, romanized: Yaña İäbaş) is a rural locality (a selo) in Arça District, Tatarstan. The population was 418 as of 2010. Yaña İäbaş is located 20 km from Arça, district's administrative centre, and 89 km from Ԛazаn, republic's capital, by road. The village was established in 17th century. There are 5 streets in the village.
