= Keçe Kirmän =

Keçe Kirmän Кече Кирмән
- selo
- Location within Tatarstan
- Country: Russia
- Region: Tatarstan
- District: Mamadış District
- Time zone: UTC+3:00

Keçe Kirmän (Tatar: Кече Кирмән, romanized: Keçe Kirmän) is a rural locality (a selo) in Mamadış District, Tatarstan. The population was 439 as of 2010. Keçe Kirmän is located 25 km from Mamadış, district's administrative centre, and 155 km from Qazаn, republic's capital, by road. The earliest known record of the settlement dates from 1680. There are 6 streets in the village.
