= Pöşäñgär =

Pöşäñgär Пөшәңгәр
- selo
- Location within Tatarstan
- Country: Russia
- Region: Tatarstan
- District: Arça District
- Municipality: Apaz rural settlement
- Time zone: UTC+3:00

Pöşäñgär (Tatar: Пөшәңгәр, romanized: Pöşäñgär) is a rural locality (a selo) in Arça District, Tatarstan. The population was 399 as of 2010. Pöşäñgär is located 41 km from Arça, district's administrative centre, and 119 km from Ԛazаn, republic's capital, by road. The earliest known record of the settlement dates from 1664. There are 3 streets in the village.
