= Kücäkä =

Kücäkä Күҗәкә
- selo
- Location within Tatarstan
- Country: Russia
- Region: Tatarstan
- District: Aqtanış District
- Time zone: UTC+3:00

Kücäkä (Tatar: Күҗәкә, romanized: Kücäkä) is a rural locality (a selo) in Aqtanış District, Tatarstan. The population was 410 as of 2010. Kücäkä is located 35 km from Aqtanış, district's administrative centre, and 335 km from Qazan, republic's capital, by road. The earliest known record of the settlement dates from 1706. There are 8 streets in the village.
