= Qırındı =

Qırındı Кырынды
- selo
- Location within Tatarstan
- Country: Russia
- Region: Tatarstan
- District: Ägerce District

Population (2002)
  - Total: 643
- Time zone: UTC+3:00

Qırındı (Tatar: Кырынды, romanized: Qırındı) is a rural locality (a selo) in Ägerce District, Tatarstan. The population was 643 as of 2010. Qırındı is located 50 km from Ägerce, district's administrative centre, and 291 km from Ԛazan, republic's capital, by road. The earliest known record of the settlement dates from 17th century. There are 9 streets in the village.
