= Şurabaş =

Şurabaş Шурабаш
- selo
- Location within Tatarstan
- Country: Russia
- Region: Tatarstan
- District: Arça District
- Municipality: Yaña Kenär rural settlement
- Time zone: UTC+3:00

Şurabaş (Tatar: Шурабаш, romanized: Şurabaş) is a rural locality (a selo) in Arça District, Tatarstan. The population was 448 as of 2010. Şurabaş is located 48 km from Arça, district's administrative centre, and 108 km from Ԛazаn, republic's capital, by road. The village was established in 18th century. There are 7 streets in the village.
