= İske Esläk =

İske Esläk Иске Эсләк
- selo
- Location within Tatarstan
- Country: Russia
- Region: Tatarstan
- District: Ägerce District

Population (2002)
  - Total: 474
- Time zone: UTC+3:00

İske Esläk (Tatar: Иске Эсләк, romanized: İske Esläk) is a rural locality (a selo) in Ägerce District, Tatarstan. The population was 380 as of 2010. İske Esläk is located 80 km from Ägerce, district's administrative centre, and 352 km from Ԛazan, republic's capital, by road. The earliest known record of the settlement dates from 16th century. There are 4 streets in the village.
