= Olıyaz, Mamadyshsky District =

Olıyaz Олыяз
- selo
- Location within Tatarstan
- Country: Russia
- Region: Tatarstan
- District: Mamadış District
- Municipality: Olıyaz rural settlement
- Time zone: UTC+3:00

Olıyaz (Tatar: Олыяз, romanized: Olıyaz) is a rural locality (a selo) in Mamadış District, Tatarstan. The population was 537 as of 2010. Olıyaz is located 30 km from Mamаdış, district's administrative centre, and 195 km from Ԛazаn, republic's capital, by road. The earliest known record of the settlement dates from 1710/1711. There are 7 streets in the village.
