= Tübän Täkäneş =

Tübän Täkäneş Түбән Тәкәнеш
- selo
- Location within Tatarstan
- Country: Russia
- Region: Tatarstan
- District: Mamadış District
- Time zone: UTC+3:00

Tübän Täkäneş (Tatar: Түбән Тәкәнеш, romanized: Tübän Täkäneş) is a rural locality (a selo) in Mamadış District, Tatarstan. The population was 936 as of 2010. Tübän Täkäneş is located 44 km from Мamadış, district's administrative centre, and 154 km from Qazаn, republic's capital, by road. The earliest known record of the settlement dates from 1680. There are 9 streets in the village.
