= Tatar Yamalısı =

Tatar Yamalısı Татар Ямалысы
- selo
- Location within Tatarstan
- Country: Russia
- Region: Tatarstan
- District: Aqtanış District
- Time zone: UTC+3:00

Tatar Yamalısı (Tatar: Татар Ямалысы, romanized: Tatar Yamalısı) is a rural locality (a selo) in Aqtanış District, Tatarstan. The population was 400 as of 2010. Tatar Yamalısı is located 20 km from Aqtanış, district's administrative centre, and 359 km from Qazan, republic's capital, by road. The village was established in 17th century. There are 4 streets in the village.
