= Yuğarı Yaxşıy =

Yuğarı Yaxşıy Югары Яхшый
- selo
- Location within Tatarstan
- Country: Russia
- Region: Tatarstan
- District: Aqtanış District
- Time zone: UTC+3:00

Yuğarı Yaxşıy (Tatar: Югары Яхшый, romanized: Yuğarı Yaxşıy) is a rural locality (a selo) in Aqtanış District, Tatarstan. The population was 202 as of 2010. Yuğarı Yaxşıy is located 41 km from Aqtanış, district's administrative centre, and 344 km from Qazan, republic's capital, by road. The village was established in 18th century. There are 4 streets in the village.
