= Ayu, Tatarstan =

Ayu Аю
- selo
- Location within Tatarstan
- Country: Russia
- Region: Tatarstan
- District: Minzälä District
- Time zone: UTC+3:00

Ayu (Tatar: Аю, romanized: Ayu) is a rural locality (a selo) in Minzälä District, Tatarstan. The population was 400 as of 2010. Ayu, Tatarstan is located 16 km from Мinzälä, district's administrative centre, and 303 km from Qаzаn, republic's capital, by road. The earliest known record of the settlement dates from 1725. There are 8 streets in the village.
