= Qupqa =

Qupqa Купка
- selo
- Location within Tatarstan
- Country: Russia
- Region: Tatarstan
- District: Kukmara District
- Time zone: UTC+3:00

Qupqa (Tatar: Купка, romanized: Qupqa) is a rural locality (a selo) in Kukmara District, Tatarstan. The population was 526 as of 2010. Qupqa is located 16 km from Kukmаra, the district's administrative centre, and 149 km from Ԛazаn, the republic's capital, by road. The earliest known record of the settlement dates back to 1678. There are 3 streets in the village.
