= Qamışlı, Kukmorsky District =

Qamışlı Камышлы
- derevnya
- Location within Tatarstan
- Country: Russia
- Region: Tatarstan
- District: Kukmara District
- Time zone: UTC+3:00

Qamışlı (Tatar: Камышлы, romanized: Qamışlı) is a rural locality (a derevnya) in Kukmara District, Tatarstan. The population was 293 as of 2010. Qamışlı, Kukmorsky District is located 10 km (6.2 mi) from Kukmara, district's administrative centre, and 140 km (87 mi) from Ԛazan, republic's capital, by road. The earliest known record of the settlement dates from 1678. There are three streets in the village.
