= Köyek-Yırıqsa =

Köyek-Yırıqsa Көек-Ерыкса
- selo
- Location within Tatarstan
- Country: Russia
- Region: Tatarstan
- District: Mamadış District
- Time zone: UTC+3:00

Köyek-Yırıqsa (Tatar: Көек-Ерыкса, romanized: Köyek-Yırıqsa) is a rural locality (a selo) in Mamadış District, Tatarstan. The population was 592 as of 2010. Köyek-Yırıqsa is located 20 km from Mamadış, district's administrative centre, and 183 km from Ԛazаn, republic's capital, by road. The earliest known record of the settlement dates from 1680. There are 6 streets in the village.
