= Yuğarı Subaş =

Yuğarı Subaş Югары Субаш
- selo
- Location within Tatarstan
- Country: Russia
- Region: Tatarstan
- District: Baltaç District
- Time zone: UTC+3:00

Yuğarı Subaş (Tatar: Югары Субаш, romanized: Yuğarı Subaş) is a rural locality (a selo) in Baltaç District, Tatarstan. The population was 414 as of 2010. Yuğarı Subaş is located 25 km from Baltaç, district's administrative centre, and 129 km from Ԛazаn, republic's capital, by road. The village was established in 17th century. There are 9 streets in the village.
