= Taqtalaçıq =

Taqtalaçıq Такталачык
- selo
- Location within Tatarstan
- Country: Russia
- Region: Tatarstan
- District: Aqtanış District
- Time zone: UTC+3:00

Taqtalaçıq (Tatar: Такталачык, romanized: Taqtalaçıq) is a rural locality (a selo) in Aqtanış District, Tatarstan. The population was 832 as of 2010. Taqtalaçıq is located 14 km (8.7 mi) from Aqtanış, district's administrative centre, and 364 km (226 mi) from Qazan, republic's capital, by road. The earliest known record of the settlement dates from 1702. There are nine streets in the village.
