= Qodaş, Bugulminsky District =

Qodaş Кодаш
- selo
- Location within Tatarstan
- Country: Russia
- Region: Tatarstan
- District: Bögelmä District
- Time zone: UTC+3:00

Qodaş (Tatar: Кодаш, romanized: Qodaş) is a rural locality (a selo) in Bögelmä District, Tatarstan. The population was 744 as of 2010. Qodaş is located 35 km from Bögelmä, district's administrative centre, and 289 km from Ԛazаn, republic's capital, by road. The earliest known record of the settlement dates from 1747. There are 5 streets in the village.
