= Köşkätbaş =

Köşkätbaş Көшкәтбаш
- selo
- Location within Tatarstan
- Country: Russia
- Region: Tatarstan
- District: Baltaç District

Population (2010)
  - Total: 461
- Time zone: UTC+3:00

Köşkätbaş (Tatar: Көшкәтбаш, romanized: Köşkätbaş) is a rural locality (a selo) in Baltaç District, Tatarstan. The population was 450 as of 2010. Köşkätbaş is located 20 km from Baltaç, district's administrative centre, and 117 km from Ԛazаn, republic's capital, by road. The earliest known record of the settlement dates from 16th century. There are 11 streets in the village.
