= Şekä, Arsky District =

Şekä Шекә
- selo
- Location within Tatarstan
- Country: Russia
- Region: Tatarstan
- District: Arça District
- Municipality: Şuşmabaş rural settlement
- Time zone: UTC+3:00

Şekä (Tatar: Шекә, romanized: Şekä) is a rural locality (a selo) in Arça District, Tatarstan. The population was 451 as of 2010. Şekä, Arsky District is located 37 km from Arça, district's administrative centre, and 106 km from Ԛazаn, republic's capital, by road. The earliest known record of the settlement dates from 1678. There are 4 streets in the village.
