= Qayınsar, Kukmorsky District =

Qayınsar Каенсар
- selo
- Location within Tatarstan
- Country: Russia
- Region: Tatarstan
- District: Kukmara District

Population (2017)
  - Total: 360
- Time zone: UTC+3:00

Qayınsar (Tatar: Каенсар, romanized: Qayınsar) is a rural locality (a selo) in Kukmara District, Tatarstan. The population was 390 as of 2010. Qayınsar, Kukmorsky District is located 17 km from Kukmаrа, district's administrative centre, and 147 km from Ԛazаn, republic's capital, by road. The earliest known record of the settlement dates from 1619. There are 9 streets in the village.
