= İske Qormaş =

İske Qormaş Иске Кормаш
- selo
- Location within Tatarstan
- Country: Russia
- Region: Tatarstan
- District: Aqtanış District
- Time zone: UTC+3:00

İske Qormaş (Tatar: Иске Кормаш, romanized: İske Qormaş) is a rural locality (a selo) in Aqtanış District, Tatarstan. The population was 451 as of 2010. İske Qormaş is located 25 km from Aqtanış, district's administrative centre, and 344 km from Qazan, republic's capital, by road. The village was established in 18th century. There are 10 streets in the village.
