= Äzi =

Äzi Әзи
- selo
- Location within Tatarstan
- Country: Russia
- Region: Tatarstan
- District: Ägerce District

Population (2012)
  - Total: 345
- Time zone: UTC+3:00

Äzi (Tatar: Әзи, romanized: Äzi) is a rural locality (a selo) in Ägerce District, Tatarstan. The population was 355 as of 2010. Äzi is located 85 km from Ägerce, district's administrative centre, and 318 km from Ԛazan, republic's capital, by road. The village was established in 19th century. There are 4 streets in the village.
