= Çikänäs =

Çikänäs Чикәнәс
- selo
- Location within Tatarstan
- Country: Russia
- Region: Tatarstan
- District: Arça District
- Municipality: Yaña Qırlay rural settlement
- Time zone: UTC+3:00

Çikänäs (Tatar: Чикәнәс, romanized: Çikänäs) is a rural locality (a selo) in Arça District, Tatarstan. The population was 304 as of 2010. Çikänäs is located 16 km from Arça, district's administrative centre, and 82 km from Ԛazаn, republic's capital, by road. The earliest known record of the settlement dates from 1678. There are 2 streets in the village.
