= Aqçişmä, Arsky District =

Aqçişmä Акчишмә
- derevnya
- Location within Tatarstan
- Country: Russia
- Region: Tatarstan
- District: Arça District
- Municipality: Taşkiçü rural settlement

Population (2000)
  - Total: 262
- Time zone: UTC+3:00

Aqçişmä (Tatar: Акчишмә, romanized: Aqçişmä) is a rural locality (a derevnya) in Arça District, Tatarstan. The population was 234 as of 2010. Aqçişmä, Arsky District is located 27 km from Arça, district's administrative centre, and 102 km from Ԛazan, republic's capital, by road. The village was established in 17th century. There are 1 streets in the village.
