= Yaña Salawıç =

Yaña Salawıç Яңа Салавыч
- derevnya
- Location within Tatarstan
- Country: Russia
- Region: Tatarstan
- District: Baltaç District
- Time zone: UTC+3:00

Yaña Salawıç (Tatar: Яңа Салавыч, romanized: Yaña Salawıç) is a rural locality (a derevnya) in Baltaç District, Tatarstan. The population was 231 as of 2010. Yaña Salawıç is located 10 km from Baltaç, district's administrative centre, and 112 km from Ԛazаn, republic's capital, by road. The village was established in 18th century. There are 1 streets in the village.
