= İske Säfär =

İske Säfär Иске Сәфәр
- selo
- Location within Tatarstan
- Country: Russia
- Region: Tatarstan
- District: Aqtanış District
- Time zone: UTC+3:00

İske Säfär (Tatar: Иске Сәфәр, romanized: İske Säfär) is a rural locality (a selo) in Aqtanış District, Tatarstan. The population was 923 as of 2010. İske Säfär is located 30 km from Aqtanış, district's administrative centre, and 341 km from Qazan, republic's capital, by road. The village was established in 17th century. There are 11 streets in the village.
