= Qarile =

Qarile Кариле
- selo
- Location within Tatarstan
- Country: Russia
- Region: Tatarstan
- District: Baltaç District

Population (2015)
  - Total: 1,318
- Time zone: UTC+3:00

Qarile (Tatar: Кариле, romanized: Qarile) is a rural locality (a selo) in Baltaç District, Tatarstan. The population was 1287 as of 2010. Qarile is located 4 km from Baltaç, district's administrative centre, and 106 km from Ԛazаn, republic's capital, by road. The earliest known record of the settlement dates from 1678. There are 20 streets in the village.
