= Särdäbaş =

Särdäbaş Сәрдәбаш
- selo
- Location within Tatarstan
- Country: Russia
- Region: Tatarstan
- District: Arça District
- Municipality: Şuşmabaş rural settlement
- Time zone: UTC+3:00

Särdäbaş (Tatar: Сәрдәбаш, romanized: Särdäbaş) is a rural locality (a selo) in Arça District, Tatarstan. The population was 298 as of 2010. Särdäbaş is located 48 km from Arça, district's administrative centre, and 116 km from Ԛazаn, republic's capital, by road. The village was established in 17th century. There are 3 streets in the village.
