= Aqküz =

Aqküz Аккүз
- selo
- Location within Tatarstan
- Country: Russia
- Region: Tatarstan
- Time zone: UTC+3:00

Aqküz (Tatar: Аккүз, romanized: Aqküz) is a rural locality (a selo) in Aqtanış District, Tatarstan. The population was 255 as of 2010. Aqküz is located 27 km from Aqtanış, district's administrative centre, and 365 km from Qazan, republic's capital, by road. The earliest known record of the settlement dates from 1745. There are 5 streets in the village.
