= Yuğarı Biräzä =

Yuğarı Biräzä Югары Бирәзә
- derevnya
- Location within Tatarstan
- Country: Russia
- Region: Tatarstan
- District: Arça District
- Municipality: Yaña Qırlay rural settlement

Population (2015)
  - Total: 219
- Time zone: UTC+3:00

Yuğarı Biräzä (Tatar: Югары Бирәзә, romanized: Yuğarı Biräzä) is a rural locality (a derevnya) in Arça District, Tatarstan. The population was 215 as of 2010. Yuğarı Biräzä is located 10 km from Arça, district's administrative centre, and 78 km from Ԛazаn, republic's capital, by road. The earliest known record of the settlement dates from 16th century. There are 6 streets in the village.
