= İsänbay =

İsänbay Исәнбай
- selo
- Location within Tatarstan
- Country: Russia
- Region: Tatarstan
- District: Ägerce District

Population (2024)
  - Total: 778
- Time zone: UTC+3:00

İsänbay (Tatar: Исәнбай, romanized: İsänbay) is a rural locality (a selo) in Ägerce District, Tatarstan. The population was 977 as of 2010. İsänbay is located 86 km from Ägerce, district's administrative centre, and 329 km from Ԛazan, republic's capital, by road. The village was established in 17th century. There are 9 streets in the village.
