= Olı İmän =

Olı İmän Олы Имән
- selo
- Location within Tatarstan
- Country: Russia
- Region: Tatarstan
- District: Aqtanış District
- Time zone: UTC+3:00

Olı İmän (Tatar: Олы Имән, romanized: Olı İmän) is a rural locality (a selo) in the Aqtanış District, Tatarstan. As of 2010, the population was 330. Olı İmän is located 42 km from Aqtanış, the district's administrative centre, and 338 km from Qazan, the republic's capital, by road. The village was established in the 17th century. There are four streets in the village.
