= Tübän Öskebaş =

Tübän Öskebaş Түбән Өскебаш
- selo
- Location within Tatarstan
- Country: Russia
- Region: Tatarstan
- District: Kukmara District
- Time zone: UTC+3:00

Tübän Öskebaş (Tatar: Түбән Өскебаш, romanized: Tübän Öskebaş) is a rural locality (a selo) in Kukmara District, Tatarstan. The population was 424 as of 2010. Tübän Öskebaş is located 27 km from Kukmara, district's administrative centre, and 167 km from Ԛazan, republic's capital, by road. The earliest known record of the settlement dates from 1678. There are 3 streets in the village.
