= Tübän Uşma, Mamadyshsky District =

Tübän Uşma Түбән Ушма
- selo
- Location within Tatarstan
- Country: Russia
- Region: Tatarstan
- District: Mamadış District
- Time zone: UTC+3:00

Tübän Uşma (Tatar: Түбән Ушма, romanized: Tübän Uşma) is a rural locality (a selo) in Mamadış District, Tatarstan. The population was 955 as of 2010. Tübän Uşma, Mamadyshsky District is located 9 km from Мamadış, district's administrative centre, and 171 km from Qazаn, republic's capital, by road. The earliest known record of the settlement dates from 1680. There are 6 streets in the village.
