= Yaña Qırlay =

Yaña Qırlay Яңа Кырлай
- selo
- Location within Tatarstan
- Country: Russia
- Region: Tatarstan
- District: Arça District
- Municipality: Yaña Qırlay rural settlement

Population (2014)
  - Total: 523
- Time zone: UTC+3:00

Yaña Qırlay (Tatar: Яңа Кырлай, romanized: Yaña Qırlay) is a rural locality (a selo) in Arça District, Tatarstan. The population was 535 as of 2010. Yaña Qırlay is located 22 kilometres (14 mi) from Аrça, district's administrative centre, and 89 kilometres (55 mi) from Ԛazаn, republic's capital, by road. The village was established in 17th or 18th century. There are 6 streets in the village.
