= Üräsbaş =

Üräsbaş Үрәсбаш
- selo
- Location within Tatarstan
- Country: Russia
- Region: Tatarstan
- District: Kukmara District
- Time zone: UTC+3:00

Üräsbaş (Tatar: Үрәсбаш, romanized: Üräsbaş) is a rural locality (a selo) in Kukmara District, Tatarstan. The population was 327 as of 2010. Üräsbaş is located 18 km from Kukmara, district's administrative centre, and 154 km from Ԛazan, republic's capital, by road. The village was established in 17th century. There are 4 streets in the village.
