= Urta Kirmän =

Urta Kirmän Урта Кирмән
- selo
- Location within Tatarstan
- Country: Russia
- Region: Tatarstan
- District: Mamadış District

Population (2013)
  - Total: 391
- Time zone: UTC+3:00

Urta Kirmän (Tatar: Урта Кирмән, romanized: Urta Kirmän) is a rural locality (a selo) in Mamadış District, Tatarstan. The population was 412 as of 2010. Urta Kirmän is located 20 km from Мamadış, district's administrative centre, and 146 km from Ԛazаn, republic's capital, by road. The earliest known record of the settlement dates from 1680. There are 6 streets in the village.
