= Möndeş, Arsky District =

Möndeş Мөндеш
- derevnya
- Location within Tatarstan
- Country: Russia
- Region: Tatarstan
- District: Arça District
- Municipality: İske Qırlay rural settlement
- Time zone: UTC+3:00

Möndeş (Tatar: Мөндеш, romanized: Möndeş) is a rural locality (a derevnya) in Arça District, Tatarstan. The population was 485 as of 2010. Möndeş, Arsky District is located 9 km from Arça, district's administrative centre, and 76 km from Ԛazаn, republic's capital, by road. The earliest known record of the settlement dates from 1678. There are 4 streets in the village.
