= Tatar Tollısı =

Tatar Tollısı Татар Толлысы
- derevnya
- Location within Tatarstan
- Country: Russia
- Region: Tatarstan
- District: Kukmara District
- Time zone: UTC+3:00

Tatar Tollısı (Tatar: Татар Толлысы, romanized: Tatar Tollısı) is a rural locality (a derevnya) in Kukmara District, Tatarstan. The population was 416 as of 2010. Tatar Tollısı is located 38 km from Kukmara, district's administrative centre, and 174 km from Ԛazan, republic's capital, by road. The earliest known record of the settlement dates from 1680. There are 6 streets in the village.
