= Äträkle =

Äträkle Әтрәкле
- selo
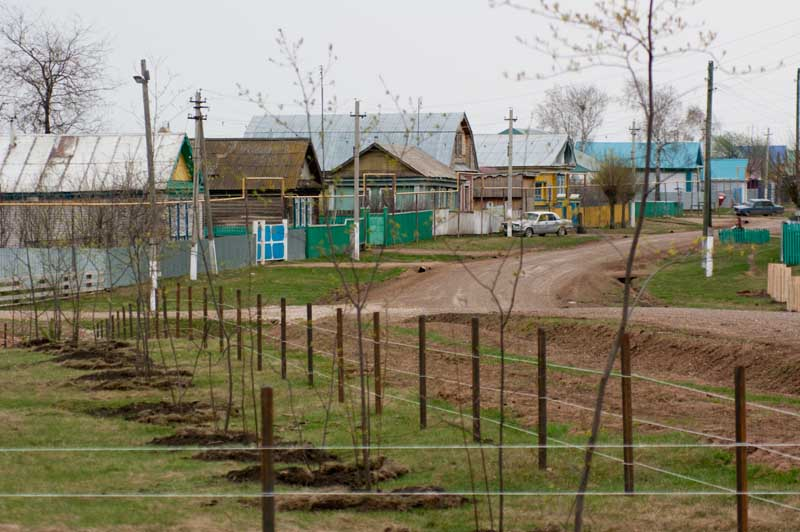

- Location within Tatarstan
- Country: Russia
- Region: Tatarstan
- District: Minzälä District
- Time zone: UTC+3:00

Äträkle (Tatar: Әтрәкле, romanized: Äträkle) is a rural locality (a selo) in Minzälä District, Tatarstan. The population was 273 as of 2010. Äträkle is located 36 km from Minzälä, district's administrative centre, and 332 km from Qazаn, republic's capital, by road. The earliest known record of the settlement dates from 1703. There are 4 streets in the village.
