= Tübän Köçek =

Tübän Köçek Түбән Көчек
- selo
- Location within Tatarstan
- Country: Russia
- Region: Tatarstan
- District: Ägerce District

Population (2015)
  - Total: 685
- Time zone: UTC+3:00

Tübän Köçek (Tatar: Түбән Көчек, romanized: Tübän Köçek) is a rural locality (a selo) in Ägerce District, Tatarstan. The population was 685 as of 2010. Tübän Köçek is located 40 km from Ägerce, district's administrative centre, and 300 km from Ԛazan, republic's capital, by road. The earliest known record of the settlement dates from 16th century. There are 7 streets in the village.
