= Tuyımbaş =

Tuyımbaş Туембаш
- selo
- Location within Tatarstan
- Country: Russia
- Region: Tatarstan
- District: Kukmara District
- Time zone: UTC+3:00

Tuyımbaş (Tatar: Туембаш, romanized: Tuyımbaş) is a rural locality (a selo) in Kukmara District, Tatarstan. The population was 593 as of 2010. Tuyımbaş is located 12 km from Kukmаra, district's administrative centre, and 164 km from Ԛazаn, republic's capital, by road. The earliest known record of the settlement dates from 1678. There are 6 streets in the village.
