= Yansıbı =

Yansıbı Янсыбы
- selo
- Location within Tatarstan
- Country: Russia
- Region: Tatarstan
- District: Kukmara District
- Time zone: UTC+3:00

Yansıbı (Tatar: Янсыбы, romanized: Yansıbı) is a rural locality (a selo) in Kukmara District, Tatarstan. The population was 329 as of 2010. Yansıbı is located 8 km from Kukmara, district's administrative centre, and 152 km from Ԛazan, republic's capital, by road. The village was established in 17th century. There are 4 streets in the village.
