= Şura =

Şura Шура
- selo
- Location within Tatarstan
- Country: Russia
- Region: Tatarstan
- District: Arça District
- Municipality: Yaña Kenär rural settlement
- Time zone: UTC+3:00

Şura (Tatar: Шура, romanized: Şura) is a rural locality (a selo) in Arça District, Tatarstan. The population was 257 as of 2010. Şura is located 50 km from Arça, district's administrative centre, and 110 km from Ԛazаn, republic's capital, by road. The village was established in 18th century. There are 5 streets in the village.
