= Salawıç Särdegäne =

Salawıç Särdegäne Салавыч Сәрдегәне
- derevnya
- Location within Tatarstan
- Country: Russia
- Region: Tatarstan
- District: Baltaç District
- Time zone: UTC+3:00

Salawıç Särdegäne (Tatar: Салавыч Сәрдегәне, romanized: Salawıç Särdegäne) is a rural locality (a derevnya) in Baltaç District, Tatarstan. The population was 278 as of 2010. Salawıç Särdegäne is located 13 km from Baltaç, the district's administrative centre, and 121 km from Ԛazаn, the republic's capital, by road. The village was established in the 18th century. There are 2 streets in the village.
