= Tatar Tanayı =

Tatar Tanayı Татар Танае
- derevnya
- Location within Tatarstan
- Country: Russia
- Region: Tatarstan
- District: Yäşel Üzän District
- Time zone: UTC+3:00

Tatar Tanayı (Tatar: Татар Танае, romanized: Tatar Tanayı) is a rural locality (a derevnya) in Yäşel Üzän District, Tatarstan. The population was 446 as of 2010. Tatar Tanayı is located 46 km from Yäşel Üzӓn, district's administrative centre, and 96 km from Qazаn, republic's capital, by road. The earliest known record of the settlement dates from 1619. There are 4 streets in the village.
