= Bornaq =

Bornaq Борнак
- derevnya
- Location within Tatarstan
- Country: Russia
- Region: Tatarstan
- District: Baltaç District

Population (2010)
  - Total: 570
- Time zone: UTC+3:00

Bornaq (Tatar: Борнак, romanized: Bornaq) is a rural locality (a derevnya) in Baltasinsky District, Tatarstan. The population was 586 as of 2010. Bornaq is located 18 kilometres (11 mi) from Baltaç, district's administrative centre, and 120 kilometres (75 mi) from Kazan, republic's capital, by road. The earliest known record of the settlement dates from 1678. There are 5 streets in the village.
