= Yamorza =

Yamorza Яморза
- selo
- Location within Tatarstan
- Country: Russia
- Region: Tatarstan
- District: Ägerce District

Population (2010)
  - Total: 207
- Time zone: UTC+3:00

Yamorza (Tatar: Яморза, romanized: Yamorza) is a rural locality (a selo) in Ägerce District, Tatarstan. The population was 207 as of 2010. Yamorza is located 65 km from Ägerce, district's administrative centre, and 322 km from Ԛazan, republic's capital, by road. The village was established in 17th century. There are 2 streets in the village.
