= Yädegär =

Yädegär Ядегәр, Ядыгерь
- selo
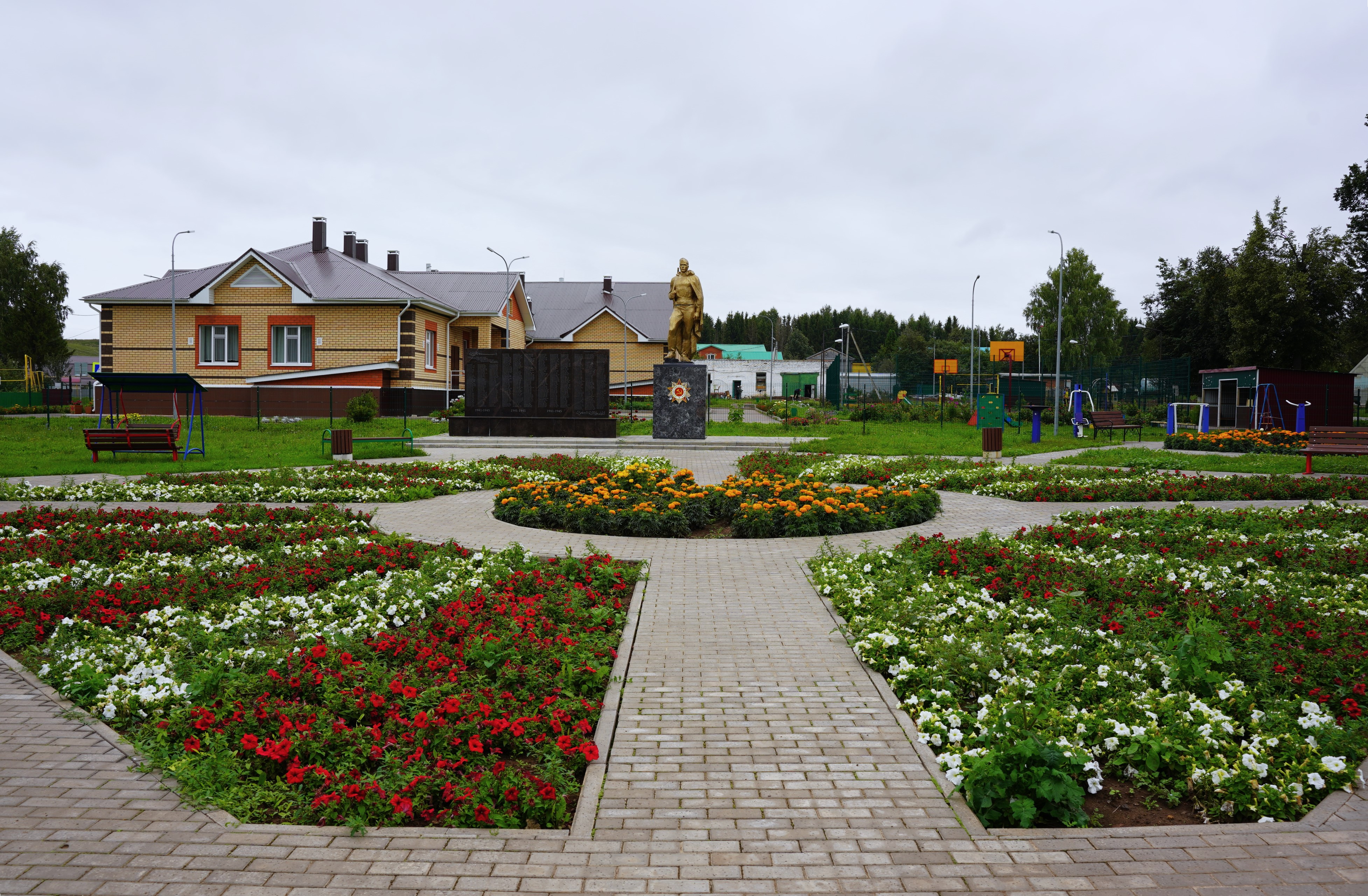
- Monument to the Heroes of the Great Patriotic War in, Yädegär

- Location within Tatarstan
- Country: Russia
- Region: Tatarstan
- District: Kukmara District
- Municipality: Yadygerskoe selskoe poselenie

Population (2017)
  - Total: 523
- Time zone: UTC+3:00

Yädegär (Tatar: Ядегәр, romanized: Yädegär) (Russian: Ядыгерь, romanized: Yadygyer) is a rural locality (a selo) in Kukmara District, Tatarstan. The population was 497 as of 2020. Yädegär is located 29km from Kukmara, the district's administrative centre, and 127km from Kazan, the republic's capital, by road. The earliest known record of the settlement dates from 1678. There are 7 streets in the village.
