= Yuğarı Täkäneş =

Yuğarı Täkäneş Югары Тәкәнеш
- derevnya
- Location within Tatarstan
- Country: Russia
- Region: Tatarstan
- District: Mamadış District
- Time zone: UTC+3:00

Yuğarı Täkäneş (Tatar: Югары Тәкәнеш, romanized: Yuğarı Täkäneş) is a rural locality (a derevnya) in Mamadış District, Tatarstan. The population was 284 as of 2010. Yuğarı Täkäneş is located 47 km from Mamadış, district's administrative centre, and 164 km from Qazаn, republic's capital, by road. The village was established in 18th century. There are 5 streets in the village.
