= Batır, Bugulminsky District =

Batır Батыр
- derevnya
- Location within Tatarstan
- Country: Russia
- Region: Tatarstan
- District: Bögelmä District
- Time zone: UTC+3:00

Batır (Tatar: Батыр, romanized: Batır) is a rural locality (a derevnya) in Bögelmä District, Tatarstan. The population was 21 as of 2010. Batır, Bugulminsky District is located 12 km from Bögelmä, district's administrative centre, and 317 km from Ԛazаn, republic's capital, by road. The village was established in 1930s. There are 4 streets in the village.
