= Miñlebay =

Miñlebay Миңлебай
- selo
- Location within Tatarstan
- Country: Russia
- Region: Tatarstan
- District: Älmät District

Population (2015)
  - Total: 1,066
- Time zone: UTC+3:00

Miñlebay (Tatar: Миңлебай, romanized: Miñlebay) is a rural locality (a selo) in Älmät District, Tatarstan. The population was 1001 as of 2010. Miñlebay is located 17 km from Älmät, district's administrative centre, and 251 km from Ԛazan, republic's capital, by road. The earliest known record of the settlement dates from 1735. There are 8 streets in the village.
