= Porşur =

Porşur Поршур
- derevnya
- Location within Tatarstan
- Country: Russia
- Region: Tatarstan
- District: Kukmara District
- Time zone: UTC+3:00

Porşur (Tatar: Поршур, romanized: Porşur) is a rural locality (a derevnya) in Kukmara District, Tatarstan. The population was 262 as of 2010. Porşur is located 30 km from Kukmara, district's administrative centre, and 129 km from Ԛazan, republic's capital, by road. The earliest known record of the settlement dates from 1710/1711. There are 3 streets in the village.
