= Qodaş, Agryzsky District =

Qodaş Кодаш
- selo
- Location within Tatarstan
- Country: Russia
- Region: Tatarstan
- District: Ägerce District

Population (2021)
  - Total: 205
- Time zone: UTC+3:00

Qodaş (Tatar: Кодаш, romanized: Qodaş) is a rural locality (a selo) in Ägerce District, Tatarstan. The population was 228 as of 2010. Qodaş, Agryzsky District is located 24 km from Ägerce, district's administrative centre, and 298 km from Ԛazan, republic's capital, by road. The earliest known record of the settlement dates from 16th century. There are 8 streets in the village.
