= Şädçe =

Şädçe Шәдче
- selo
- Location within Tatarstan
- Country: Russia
- Region: Tatarstan
- District: Mamadış District
- Time zone: UTC+3:00

Şädçe (Tatar: Шәдче, romanized: Şädçe) is a rural locality (a selo) in Mamadış District, Tatarstan. The population was 488 as of 2010. Şädçe is located 27 km from Mamаdış, district's administrative centre, and 197 km from Qаzаn, republic's capital, by road. The village was established in 17th century. There are 5 streets in the village.
