= Mämäşir =

Mämäşir Мәмәшир
- selo
- Location within Tatarstan
- Country: Russia
- Region: Tatarstan
- District: Kukmara District
- Time zone: UTC+3:00

Mämäşir (Tatar: Мәмәшир, romanized: Mämäşir) is a rural locality (a selo) in Kukmara District, Tatarstan. The population was 792 as of 2010. Mämäşir is located 32 km from Kukmarа, district's administrative centre, and 164 km from Ԛazаn, republic's capital, by road. The earliest known record of the settlement dates from 1678. There are 9 streets in the village.
