= Şuşmabaş =

Şuşmabaş Шушмабаш
- selo
- Location within Tatarstan
- Country: Russia
- Region: Tatarstan
- District: Arça District
- Municipality: Şuşmabaş rural settlement
- Time zone: UTC+3:00

Şuşmabaş (Tatar: Шушмабаш, romanized: Şuşmabaş) is a rural locality (a selo) in Arça District, Tatarstan. The population was 994 as of 2010. Şuşmabaş is located 38 km from Arça, district's administrative centre, and 105 km from Ԛazаn, republic's capital, by road. The earliest known record of the settlement dates from 1678. There are 12 streets in the village.
