= Ayış =

Ayış Аеш
- selo
- Location within Tatarstan
- Country: Russia
- Region: Tatarstan
- Time zone: UTC+3:00

Ayış (Tatar: Аеш, romanized: Ayış) is a rural locality (a selo) in Aqtanış District, Tatarstan. The population was 452 as of 2010. Ayış is located 11 km from Aqtanış, district's administrative centre, and 388 km from Qazan, republic's capital, by road. The earliest known record of the settlement dates from 1745. There are 2 streets in the village.
