= Basqan =

Basqan Баскан
- derevnya
- Location within Tatarstan
- Country: Russia
- Region: Tatarstan
- District: Mamadış District
- Time zone: UTC+3:00

Basqan (Tatar: Баскан, romanized: Basqan) is a rural locality (a derevnya) in Mamadış District, Tatarstan. The population was 272 as of 2010. Basqan is located 52 km from Mamadış, district's administrative centre, and 123 km from Ԛazаn, republic's capital, by road. The earliest known record of the settlement dates from 1724. There are 3 streets in the village.
