= Apaz =

Apaz Апаз
- Selo
- Location within Tatarstan
- Country: Russia
- Region: Tatarstan
- District: Arça District
- Municipality: Apaz rural settlement

Population (2000)
  - Total: 631
- Time zone: UTC+3:00

Apaz (Tatar: Апаз, romanized: Apaz) is a rural locality (a selo) in Arça District, Tatarstan. The population was 571 as of 2010. Apaz is located 38 km from Arça, district's administrative centre, and 114 km from Ԛazan, republic's capital, by road. The village was established in 17th century. There are 7 streets in the village.
