= Yaña Aqxuca =

Town in Tatarstan, Russia

Yaña Aqxuca Яңа Акхуҗа
- selo
- Location within Tatarstan
- Country: Russia
- Region: Tatarstan
- District: Ägerce District

Population (2010)
  - Total: 255
- Time zone: UTC+3:00

Yaña Aqxuca (Tatar: Яңа Акхуҗа, romanized: Yaña Aqxuca) is a rural locality (a selo) in Ägerce District, Tatarstan. The population was 255 as of 2010. Yaña Aqxuca is located 40 km from Ägerce, district's administrative centre, and 285 km from Ԛazan, republic's capital, by road. The village was established in 1864. There are 2 streets in the village.
