= Äcäkül =

Äcäkül Әҗәкүл
- derevnya
- Location within Tatarstan
- Country: Russia
- Region: Tatarstan
- District: Aqtanış District
- Time zone: UTC+3:00

Äcäkül (Tatar: Әҗәкүл, romanized: Äcäkül) is a rural locality (a derevnya) in Aqtanış District, Tatarstan. The population was 358 as of 2010. Äcäkül is located 5 km from Aqtanış, district's administrative centre, and 366 km from Qazan, republic's capital, by road. The earliest known record of the settlement dates from 1722. There are 6 streets in the village.
