= Urazay, Kukmorsky District =

Urazay Уразай
- derevnya
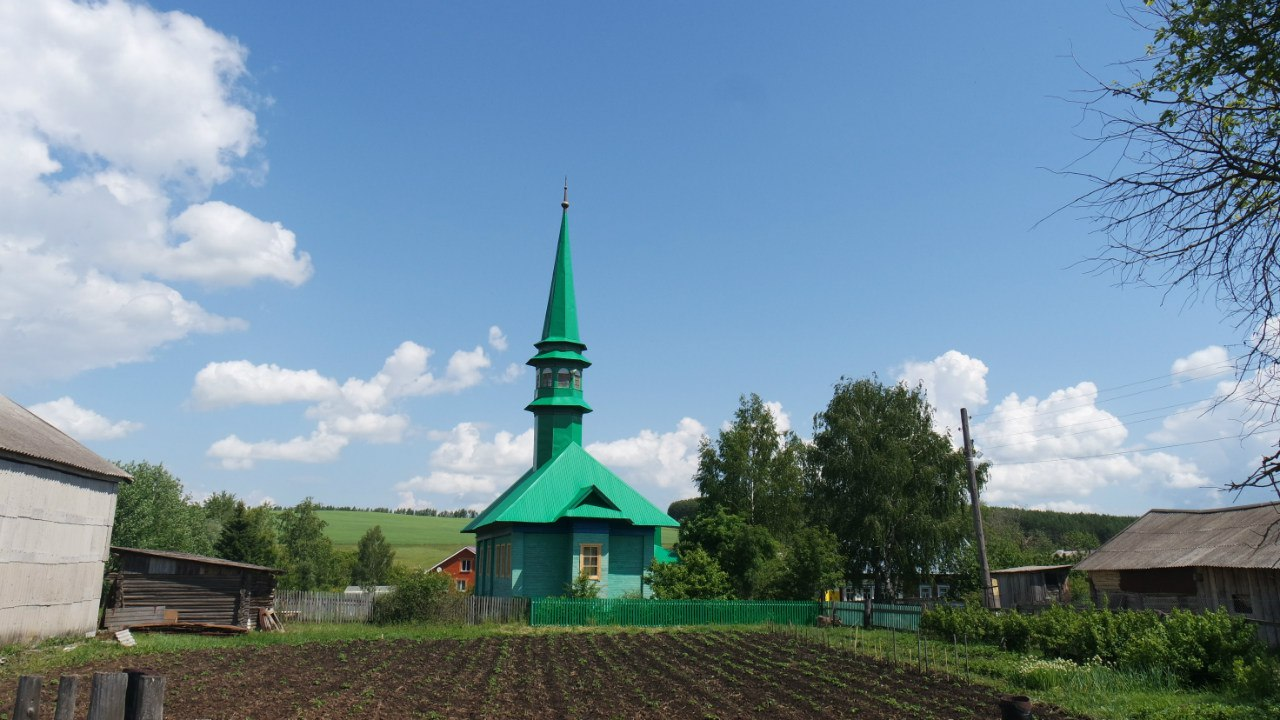
- A mosque in Urazai

- Location within Tatarstan
- Country: Russia
- Region: Tatarstan
- District: Kukmara District
- Time zone: UTC+3:00

Urazay (Tatar: Уразай, romanized: Urazay) is a rural locality (a derevnya) in Kukmara District, Tatarstan. The population was 258 as of 2010. Urazay, Kukmorsky District is located 26 km from Kukmara, district's administrative centre, and 138 km from Ԛazan, republic's capital, by road. The village was established in 18th century. There are 6 streets in the village.
