= Olıyaz, Kukmorsky District =

Olıyaz Олыяз
- selo
- Location within Tatarstan
- Country: Russia
- Region: Tatarstan
- District: Kukmara District
- Time zone: UTC+3:00

Olıyaz (Tatar: Олыяз, romanized: Olıyaz) is a rural locality (a selo) in Kukmara District, Tatarstan. The population was 840 as of 2010. Olıyaz is located 20 km from Kukmara, district's administrative centre, and 140 km from Ԛazan, republic's capital, by road. The earliest known record of the settlement dates from 1678. There are 8 streets in the village.
