= Älmändär =

Älmändär Әлмәндәр
- selo
- Location within Tatarstan
- Country: Russia
- Region: Tatarstan
- District: Apas District

Population (2000)
  - Total: 353
- Time zone: UTC+3:00

Älmändär (Tatar: Әлмәндәр, romanized: Älmändär) is a rural locality (a selo) in Apas District, Tatarstan. The population was 316 as of 2010. Älmändär is located 19 km from Apas, district's administrative centre, and 111 km from Ԛazan, republic's capital, by road. The village already existed during the period of the Qazan Khanate. There are 5 streets in the village.
