= Yuğarı Şuban =

Yuğarı Şuban Югары Шубан
- derevnya
- Location within Tatarstan
- Country: Russia
- Region: Tatarstan
- District: Baltaç District

Population (2010)
  - Total: 366
- Time zone: UTC+3:00

Yuğarı Şuban (Tatar: Югары Шубан, romanized: Yuğarı Şuban) is a rural locality (a derevnya) in Baltaç District, Tatarstan. The population was 367 as of 2010. Yuğarı Şuban is located 11 km from Baltaç, district's administrative centre, and 109 km from Ԛazаn, republic's capital, by road. The earliest known record of the settlement dates from 1678. There are 2 streets in the village.
