= Yuğarı Qıyarlı =

Yuğarı Qıyarlı Югары Кыярлы
- selo
- Location within Tatarstan
- Country: Russia
- Region: Tatarstan
- District: Mamadış District
- Time zone: UTC+3:00

Yuğarı Qıyarlı (Tatar: Югары Кыярлы, romanized: Yuğarı Qıyarlı) is a rural locality (a selo) in Mamadış District, Tatarstan. The population was 339 as of 2010. Yuğarı Qıyarlı is located 46 km from Mamadış, the district's administrative centre, and 128 km from Ԛazаn, the republic's capital, by road. The earliest known record of the settlement dates from 1627. There are 5 streets in the village.
