= Bitlänger =

Bitlänger Битләнгер
- derevnya
- Location within Tatarstan
- Country: Russia
- Region: Tatarstan
- District: Kukmara District
- Time zone: UTC+3:00

Bitlänger (Tatar: Битләнгер, romanized: Bitlänger) is a rural locality (a derevnya) in Kukmara District, Tatarstan. The population was 315 as of 2010. Bitlänger is located 24 km from Kukmаra, district's administrative centre, and 164 km from Qаzan, republic's capital, by road. The earliest known record of the settlement dates from 16th century. There are 3 streets in the village.
