= İske Çäbiä =

İske Çäbiä Иске Чәбия
- derevnya
- Location within Tatarstan
- Country: Russia
- Region: Tatarstan
- District: Mamadış District
- Time zone: UTC+3:00

İske Çäbiä (Tatar: Иске Чәбия, romanized: İske Çäbiä) is a rural locality (a derevnya) in Mamadış District, Tatarstan. The population was 200 as of 2010. İske Çäbiä is located 51 km from Mamadış, district's administrative centre, and 157 km from Ԛazаn, republic's capital, by road. The earliest known record of the settlement dates from 1616. There are 2 streets in the village.
