= Yaña Särdek =

Yaña Särdek Яңа Сәрдек
- selo
- Location within Tatarstan
- Country: Russia
- Region: Tatarstan
- District: Kukmara District
- Time zone: UTC+3:00

Yaña Särdek (Tatar: Яңа Сәрдек, romanized: Yaña Särdek) is a rural locality (a selo) in Kukmara District, Tatarstan. The population was 233 as of 2010. Yaña Särdek is located 37 km from Kukmara, district's administrative centre, and 143 km from Ԛazan, republic's capital, by road. The village was established in 1860s. There are 2 streets in the village.
