= Çubar =

Çubar Чубар
- derevnya
- Location within Tatarstan
- Country: Russia
- Region: Tatarstan
- District: Biektaw District
- Time zone: UTC+3:00

Çubar (Tatar: Чубар, romanized: Çubar) is a rural locality (a derevnya) in Biektaw District, Tatarstan. The population was 143 as of 2010. Çubar is located 10 km north of Biektaw, district's administrative centre, and 32 km north of Qazan, republic's capital, by road. The earliest known record of the settlement dates from the 17th century. It forms part of the district since 1965. There are 5 streets in the village.
