= Nalasa =

Nalasa Наласа
- selo
- Location within Tatarstan
- Country: Russia
- Region: Tatarstan
- District: Arça District
- Municipality: Nalasa rural settlement
- Time zone: UTC+3:00

Nalasa (Tatar: Наласа, romanized: Nalasa) is a rural locality (a selo) in Arça District, Tatarstan. The population was 698 as of 2010. Nalasa is located 9 km from Arça, district's administrative centre, and 73 km from Ԛazаn, republic's capital, by road. The earliest known record of the settlement dates from 1678. There are 5 streets in the village.
