= Ämäkäy =

Ämäkäy Әмәкәй
- selo
- Location within Tatarstan
- Country: Russia
- Region: Tatarstan
- District: Möslim District

Population (2002)
  - Total: 512
- Time zone: UTC+3:00

Ämäkäy (Tatar: Әмәкәй, romanized: Ämäkäy) is a rural locality (a selo) in Möslim District, Tatarstan. The population was 491 as of 2010. Ämäkäy is located 8 km from Möslim, district's administrative centre, and 368 km from Ԛazan, republic's capital, by road. The earliest known record of the settlement dates from 1732. There are 11 streets in the village.
