= Tulıbay =

Tulıbay Тулыбай
- selo
- Location within Tatarstan
- Country: Russia
- Region: Tatarstan
- District: Menzelinsky District
- Time zone: UTC+3:00

Tulıbay (Tatar: Тулыбай, romanized: Tulıbay) is a rural locality (a selo) in Menzelinsky District, Tatarstan. The population was 374 as of 2010. Tulıbay is located 19 km from Menzelinsk, district's administrative centre, and 280 km from Kazan, republic's capital, by road. The earliest known record of the settlement dates from 17th century. There are 3 streets in the village.
