= Urta Qursa =

Urta Qursa Урта Курса
- derevnya
- Location within Tatarstan
- Country: Russia
- Region: Tatarstan
- District: Arça District
- Municipality: Urta Qursa rural settlement

Population (2010)
  - Total: 220
- Time zone: UTC+3:00

Urta Qursa (Tatar: Урта Курса, romanized: Urta Qursa) is a rural locality (a derevnya) in Arça District, Tatarstan. The population was 207 as of 2010. Urta Qursa is located 11 km from Arça, district's administrative centre, and 78 km from Ԛazаn, republic's capital, by road. The village was established in 1940s. There are 4 streets in the village.
