= Arbaş =

Arbaş Арбаш
- selo
- Location within Tatarstan
- Country: Russia
- Region: Tatarstan
- District: Baltaç District

Population (2010)
  - Total: 563
- Time zone: UTC+3:00

Arbaş (Tatar: Арбаш, romanized: Arbaş) is a rural locality (a selo) in Baltaç District, Tatarstan. The population was 414 as of 2010. Arbaş is located 9 km from Baltaç, district's administrative centre, and 107 km from Ԛazаn, republic's capital, by road. The village was established in 16th or 17th century. There are 5 streets in the village.
