= Aşıtbaş =

Aşıtbaş Ашытбаш
- selo
- Location within Tatarstan
- Country: Russia
- Region: Tatarstan
- District: Arça District
- Municipality: Taşkiçü rural settlement
- Time zone: UTC+3:00

Aşıtbaş (Tatar: Ашытбаш, romanized: Aşıtbaş) is a rural locality (a selo) in Arça District, Tatarstan. The population was 613 as of 2010. Aşıtbaş is located 30 km from Arça, district's administrative centre, and 95 km from Ԛazan, republic's capital, by road. The earliest known record of the settlement dates from 1678. There are 7 streets in the village.
