= Urta Särdä =

Urta Särdä Урта Сәрдә
- selo
- Location within Tatarstan
- Country: Russia
- Region: Tatarstan
- District: Arça District
- Municipality: Urta Atı rural settlement
- Time zone: UTC+3:00

Urta Särdä (Tatar: Урта Сәрдә, romanized: Urta Särdä) is a rural locality (a selo) in Arça District, Tatarstan. The population was 279 as of 2010. Urta Särdä is located 18 km from Arça, the district's administrative centre, and 55 km from Ԛazаn, the republic's capital, by road. The earliest known record of the settlement dates from 1678. There are 3 streets in the village.
