= Qazanbaş =

Qazanbaş Казанбаш
- selo
- Location within Tatarstan
- Country: Russia
- Region: Tatarstan
- District: Arça District
- Municipality: Ürnäk rural settlement
- Time zone: UTC+3:00

Qazanbaş (Tatar: Казанбаш, romanized: Qazanbaş) is a rural locality (a selo) in Arça District, Tatarstan. The population was 541 as of 2010. Qazanbaş is located 8 km from Аrçа, district's administrative centre, and 78 km from Ԛazаn, republic's capital, by road. The earliest known record of the settlement dates from 1617. There are 9 streets in the village.
