= Qatmış =

Qatmış Катмыш
- selo
- Location within Tatarstan
- Country: Russia
- Region: Tatarstan
- District: Mamadış District
- Time zone: UTC+3:00

Qatmış (Tatar: Катмыш, romanized: Qatmış) is a rural locality (a selo) in Mamadış District, Tatarstan. The population was 491 as of 2010. Qatmış is located 55 km from Мamadış, district's administrative centre, and 124 km from Qazаn, republic's capital, by road. The earliest known record of the settlement dates from 1680. There are 4 streets in the village.
