= Yaña Mälkän =

Yaña Mälkän Яңа Мәлкән
- selo
- Location within Tatarstan
- Country: Russia
- Region: Tatarstan
- District: Minzälä District
- Time zone: UTC+3:00

Yaña Mälkän (Tatar: Яңа Мәлкән, romanized: Yaña Mälkän) is a rural locality (a selo) in Minzälä District, Tatarstan. The population was 516 as of 2010. Yaña Mälkän is located 14 km from Мinzälä, district's administrative centre, and 305 km from Qаzаn, republic's capital, by road. The earliest known record of the settlement dates from 1738. There are 10 streets in the village.
