= Täbärle =

Täbärle Тәбәрле
- selo
- Location within Tatarstan
- Country: Russia
- Region: Tatarstan
- District: Ägerce District

Population (2002)
  - Total: 282
- Time zone: UTC+3:00

Täbärle (Tatar: Тәбәрле, romanized: Täbärle) is a rural locality (a selo) in Ägerce District, Tatarstan. The population was 262 as of 2010. Täbärle is located 44 km from Ägerce, district's administrative centre, and 280 km from Ԛazan, republic's capital, by road. The earliest known record of the settlement dates from 1553. There are 4 streets in the village.
