= Şarşadı =

Şarşadı Шаршады
- selo
- Location within Tatarstan
- Country: Russia
- Region: Tatarstan
- District: Ägerce District

Population (2010)
  - Total: 339
- Time zone: UTC+3:00

Şarşadı (Tatar: Шаршады, romanized: Şarşadı) is a rural locality (a selo) in Ägerce District, Tatarstan. The population was 339 as of 2010. Şarşadı is located 61 km from Ägerce, district's administrative centre, and 302 km from Ԛazan, republic's capital, by road. The village was established in 1813. There are 2 streets in the village.
