= Kenäbaş, Baltasinsky District =

Kenäbaş Кенәбаш
- derevnya
- Location within Tatarstan
- Country: Russia
- Region: Tatarstan
- District: Baltaç District
- Time zone: UTC+3:00

Kenäbaş (Tatar: Кенәбаш, romanized: Kenäbaş) is a rural locality (a derevnya) in Baltaç District, Tatarstan. The population was 344 as of 2010. Kenäbaş is located 15 km from Baltaç, district's administrative centre, and 115 km from Ԛazаn, republic's capital, by road. The earliest known record of the settlement dates from 1678. There are 5 streets in the village.
