= Särdekbaş =

Särdekbaş Сәрдекбаш
- selo
- Location within Tatarstan
- Country: Russia
- Region: Tatarstan
- District: Kukmara District
- Time zone: UTC+3:00

Särdekbaş (Tatar: Сәрдекбаш, romanized: Särdekbaş) is a rural locality (a selo) in Kukmara District, Tatarstan. The population was 247 as of 2010. Särdekbaş is located 28 km from Kukmara, district's administrative centre, and 136 km from Ԛazan, republic's capital, by road. The earliest known record of the settlement dates from 1638. There are 3 streets in the village.
