= Tübän Şämärdän =

Tübän Şämärdän Түбән Шәмәрдән
- derevnya
- Location within Tatarstan
- Country: Russia
- Region: Tatarstan
- District: Kukmara District
- Municipality: Yadygerskoe selskoe poselenie
- Time zone: UTC+3:00

Tübän Şämärdän (Tatar: Түбән Шәмәрдән, romanized: Tübän Şämärdän) is a rural locality (a derevnya) in Kukmara District, Tatarstan. The population was 230 as of 2010. Tübän Şämärdän is located 31 km from Kukmara, district's administrative centre, and 124 km from Ԛazan, republic's capital, by road. The earliest known record of the settlement dates from 1678. There are 2 streets in the village.
