= İske Qırlay =

İske Qırlay Иске Кырлай
- selo
- Location within Tatarstan
- Country: Russia
- Region: Tatarstan
- District: Arça District
- Municipality: İske Qırlay rural settlement
- Time zone: UTC+3:00

İske Qırlay (Tatar: Иске Кырлай, romanized: İske Qırlay) is a rural locality (a selo) in Arça District, Tatarstan. The population was 320 as of 2010. İske Qırlay is located 12 km from Arça, district's administrative centre, and 80 km from Ԛazаn, republic's capital, by road. The village was established in 17th century. There are 7 streets in the village.
