= Aş-Buci =

Aş-Buci Аш-Буҗи
- derevnya
- Location within Tatarstan
- Country: Russia
- Region: Tatarstan
- District: Kukmara District
- Time zone: UTC+3:00

Aş-Buci (Tatar: Аш-Буҗи, romanized: Aş-Buci) is a rural locality (a derevnya) in Kukmara District, Tatarstan. The population was 743 as of 2010. Aş-Buci is located 19 km from Kukmаra, district's administrative centre, and 146 km from Qаzаn, republic's capital, by road. The earliest known record of the settlement dates from 1678. There are 7 streets in the village.
