= Baylanğar =

Baylanğar Байлангар
- selo
- Location within Tatarstan
- Country: Russia
- Region: Tatarstan
- District: Kukmara District
- Municipality: Baylanğar rural settlement

Population (2017)
  - Total: 717
- Time zone: UTC+3:00

Baylanğar (Tatar: Байлангар, romanized: Baylanğar) is a rural locality (a selo) in Kukmara District, Tatarstan. The population was 681 as of 2010. Baylanğar is located 12 km from Kukmara, district's administrative centre, and 145 km from Qazan, republic's capital, by road. The earliest known record of the settlement dates from 1678. There are 6 streets in the village.
