= Urazbaxtı =

Urazbaxtı Уразбахты
- selo
- Location within Tatarstan
- Country: Russia
- Region: Tatarstan
- District: Mamadış District
- Time zone: UTC+3:00

Urazbaxtı (Tatar: Уразбахты, romanized: Urazbaxtı) is a rural locality (a selo) in Mamadış District, Tatarstan. The population was 307 as of 2010. Urazbaxtı is located 25 km from Mamadış, the district's administrative centre, and 150 km from Ԛazаn, republic's capital, by road. The village was established in 16th century. There are 13 streets in the village.
