= Ornaşbaş =

Ornaşbaş Орнашбаш
- selo
- Location within Tatarstan
- Country: Russia
- Region: Tatarstan
- District: Arça District
- Municipality: Utar-Atı rural settlement

Population
  - Total: 263
- Time zone: UTC+3:00

Ornaşbaş (Tatar: Орнашбаш, romanized: Ornaşbaş) is a rural locality (a selo) in Arça District, Tatarstan. The population was 263 as of 2010. Ornaşbaş is located 20 km from Аrça, district's administrative centre, and 66 km from Ԛazаn, republic's capital, by road. The village was established in 18th century. There are 7 streets in the village.
