= İşki =

İşki Ишки
- selo
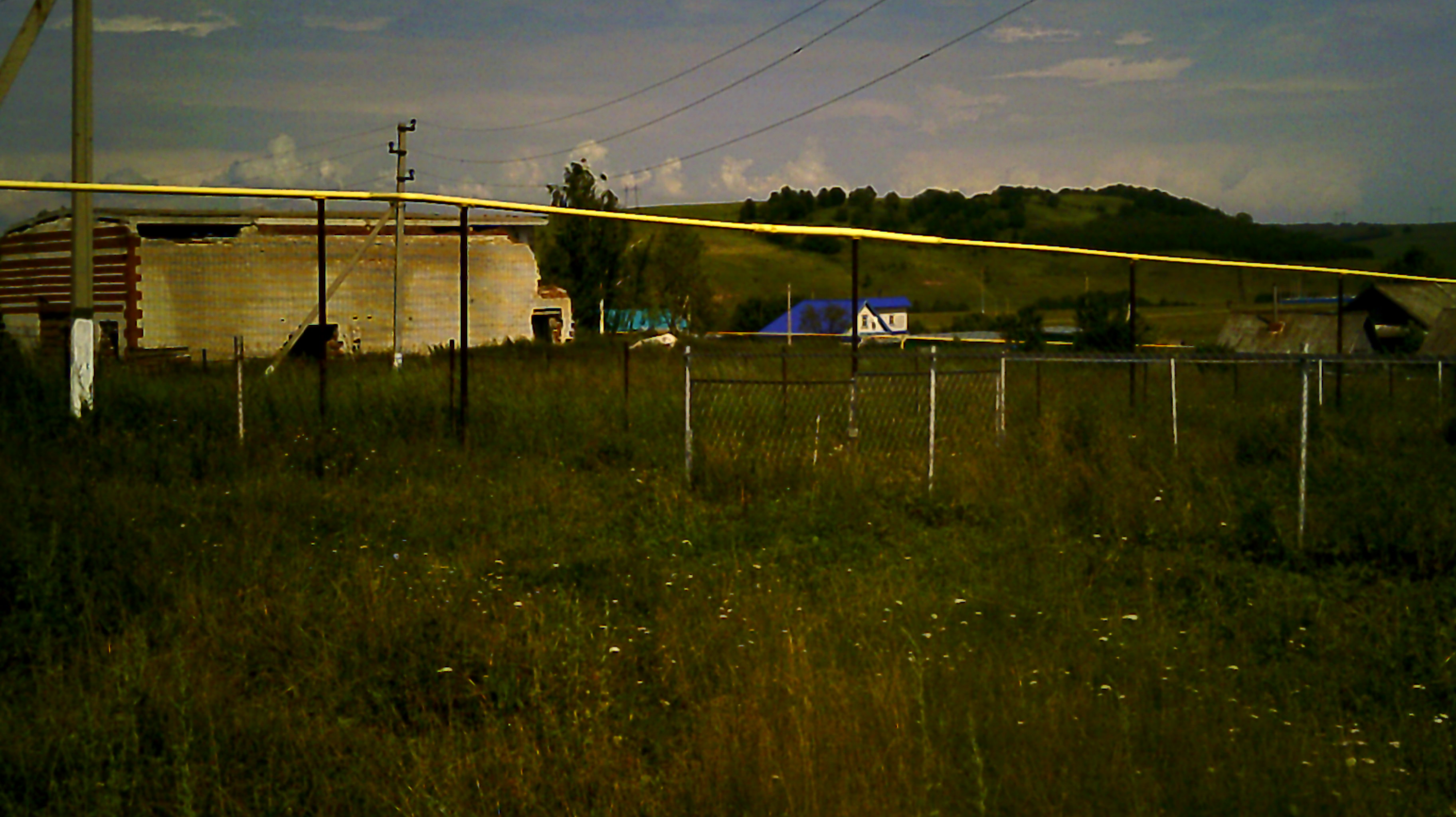

- Location within Tatarstan
- Country: Russia
- Region: Tatarstan
- District: Mamadış District
- Time zone: UTC+3:00

İşki (Tatar: Ишки, romanized: İşki) is a rural locality (a selo) in Mamadış District, Tatarstan. The population was 399 as of 2010. İşki is located 36 km from Mamаdış, district's administrative centre, and 144 km from Ԛazаn, republic's capital, by road. The earliest known record of the settlement dates from 1646. There are 11 streets in the village.
