= Zöbäyer =

Zöbäyer Зөбәер
- selo
- Location within Tatarstan
- Country: Russia
- Region: Tatarstan
- District: Aqtanış District
- Time zone: UTC+3:00

Zöbäyer (Tatar: Зөбәер, romanized: Zöbäyer) is a rural locality (a selo) in Aqtanış District, Tatarstan. The population was 315 as of 2010. Zöbäyer is located 41 km from Aqtanış, district's administrative centre, and 327 km from Qazan, republic's capital, by road. The village was established in 18th century. There are 3 streets in the village.
