= Buçirmä =

Buçirmä Бучирмә
- selo
- Location within Tatarstan
- Country: Russia
- Region: Tatarstan
- District: Kukmara District
- Time zone: UTC+3:00

Buçirmä (Tatar: Бучирмә, romanized: Buçirmä) is a rural locality (a selo) in Kukmara District, Tatarstan. The population was 356 as of 2010. Buçirmä is located 16 km from Kukmara, district's administrative centre, and 137 km from Kazan, republic's capital, by road. The village was established in 18th century. There are 4 streets in the village.
