= Maly Ryas =

Maly Ryas Кече Рәс
- Village
- Location within Tatarstan
- Coordinates: 56.113928°N 49.053593°E
- Country: Russia
- Region: Tatarstan
- District: Vysokogorsky District
- Time zone: UTC+3:00

Maly Ryas (Tatar: Кече Рәс, romanized: Keçe Räs; Russian: Малый Рясь) is a rural locality (a village) in Vysokogorsky District, Tatarstan, Russia. The population was 190 as of 2010. Maly Ryas is located 30 kilometres (19 mi) northwest of Vysokaya Gora, the district's administrative centre, and 58 kilometres (36 mi) north of Kazan, the republic's capital, by road. The earliest known record of the settlement dates from the 17th century. It forms part of the district since 1965. There are two streets in the village.
