= Aqyeget =

Aqyeget Акъегет
- selo
- Location within Tatarstan
- Country: Russia
- Region: Tatarstan
- District: Yäşel Üzän District
- Time zone: UTC+3:00

Aqyeget (Tatar: Акъегет, romanized: Aqyeget) is a rural locality (a selo) in Yäşel Üzän District, Tatarstan. The population was 334 as of 2010. Aqyeget is located 48 km from Yäşel Üzän, district's administrative centre, and 93 km from Qazan, republic's capital, by road. The village was established in 17th century. There are 19 streets in the village.
