= Qursa =

Qursa Курса
- posyolok
- Location within Tatarstan
- Country: Russia
- Region: Tatarstan
- District: Arça District
- Municipality: Sece rural settlement
- Time zone: UTC+3:00

Qursa (Tatar: Курса, romanized: Qursa) is a rural locality (a posyolok) in Arça District, Tatarstan. The population was 279 as of 2010. Qursa is located 20 km from Arça, district's administrative centre, and 92 km from Kazan, the republic's capital, by road. The village was established in the 1930s. There are 3 streets in the village.
