= Olı Räs =

Olı Räs Олы Рәс
- derevnya
- Location within Tatarstan
- Coordinates: 56°6′18″N 49°4′46″E
- Country: Russia
- Region: Tatarstan
- District: Biektaw District
- Time zone: UTC+3:00

Olı Räs (Tatar: Олы Рәс, romanized: Olı Räs) is a rural locality (a derevnya) in Biektaw District, Tatarstan. The population was 11 as of 2010. Olı Räs is located 28 km northwest of Biektaw, district's administrative centre, and 56 km north of Qazan, republic's capital, by road.

The earliest known record of the settlement dates from the 18th century. It forms part of the district since 1965.

There is 1 street in the village.
