= Or, Tatarstan =

Or Ор
- selo
- Location within Tatarstan
- Country: Russia
- Region: Tatarstan
- District: Baltaç District
- Time zone: UTC+3:00

Or (Tatar: Ор, romanized: Or) is a rural locality (a selo) in Baltaç District, Tatarstan. The population was 448 as of 2010. Or, Tatarstan is located 24 km from Вaltaç, district's administrative centre, and 104 km from Ԛazаn, republic's capital, by road. The village was established in 18th century. There are 2 streets in the village.
