= Chamyak =

Chamyak Чәмәк
- Village
- Location within Tatarstan
- Coordinates: 56.074227°N 49.126725°E
- Country: Russia
- Region: Tatarstan
- District: Vysokogorsky District
- Time zone: UTC+3:00

Chamyak (Tatar: Чәмәк, romanized: Çämäk; Russian: Чамяк) is a rural locality (a village) in Vysokogorsky District, Tatarstan, Russia. The population was 28 as of 2010. Chamyak is located 32 kilometres (20 mi) northwest of Vysokaya Gora, the district's administrative centre, and 57 kilometres (35 mi) north of Kazan, the republic's capital, by road. The earliest known record of the settlement dates from 1646. It forms part of the district since 1965.

There are three streets in the village.
