= Aywan, Tatarstan =

Aywan Айван
- selo
- Location within Tatarstan
- Country: Russia
- Region: Tatarstan
- District: Arça District
- Municipality: Arça urban settlement
- Time zone: UTC+3:00

Aywan (Tatar: Айван, romanized: Aywan) is a rural locality (a selo) in Arça District, Tatarstan. The population was 588 as of 2010. Aywan, Tatarstan is located 3 km from Arça, district's administrative centre, and 67 km from Ԛazаn, republic's capital, by road. The earliest known record of the settlement dates from 1602/1603. There are 17 streets in the village.
