= Tübän Atı =

Tübän Atı Түбән Аты
- derevnya
- Location within Tatarstan
- Country: Russia
- Region: Tatarstan
- District: Arça District
- Municipality: Urta Atı rural settlement
- Time zone: UTC+3:00

Tübän Atı (Tatar: Түбән Аты, romanized: Tübän Atı) is a rural locality (a derevnya) in Arça District, Tatarstan. The population was 493 as of 2010. Tübän Atı is located 12 km from Аrça, district's administrative centre, and 62 km from Ԛazаn, republic's capital, by road. The earliest known record of the settlement dates from 1678. There are 7 streets in the village.
