= Qızıl Şäreq, Vysokogorsky District =

Qızıl Şäreq Кызыл Шәрекъ
- posyolok
- Location within Tatarstan
- Country: Russia
- Region: Tatarstan
- District: Biektaw District
- Time zone: UTC+3:00

Qızıl Şäreq (Tatar: Кызыл Шәрекъ, romanized: Qızıl Şäreq) is a rural locality (a posyolok) in Biektaw District, Tatarstan. The population was 61 as of 2010.

Qızıl Şäreq is located 17 km east of Biektaw, district's administrative centre, and 43 km northeast of Qazan, republic's capital, by road.

The village was established in 1930s. It forms part of the district since 1965.

There are 5 streets in the village.
