= Puçı =

Puçı Пучы
- selo
- Location within Tatarstan
- Country: Russia
- Region: Tatarstan
- District: Aqtanış District
- Time zone: UTC+3:00

Puçı (Tatar: Пучы, romanized: Puçı) is a rural locality (a selo) in Aqtanış District, Tatarstan. The population was 1409 as of 2010. Puçı is located 48 km from Aqtanış, district's administrative centre, and 322 km from Qazan, republic's capital, by road. The village was established in 18th century. There are 16 streets in the village.
