= Mircäm =

Mircäm Мирҗәм
- derevnya
- Location within Tatarstan
- Country: Russia
- Region: Tatarstan
- District: Arça District
- Municipality: Apaz rural settlement
- Time zone: UTC+3:00

Mircäm (Tatar: Мирҗәм, romanized: Mircäm) is a rural locality (a derevnya) in Arça District, Tatarstan. The population was 237 as of 2010. Mircäm is located 42 km from Arça, district's administrative centre, and 119 km from Ԛazаn, republic's capital, by road. The earliest known record of the settlement dates from 1678. There are 3 streets in the village.
