= Ütägän =

Ütägän Үтәгән
- selo
- Location within Tatarstan
- Country: Russia
- Region: Tatarstan
- District: Ägerce District

Population (2002)
  - Total: 364
- Time zone: UTC+3:00

Ütägän (Tatar: Үтәгән, romanized: Ütägän) is a rural locality (a selo) in Ägerce District, Tatarstan. The population was 287 as of 2010. Ütägän is located 85 km from Ägerce, district's administrative centre, and 355 km from Ԛazan, republic's capital, by road. The village was established in 17th century. There are 5 streets in the village.
