= Yañawıl, Agryzsky District =

Yañawıl Яңавыл
- selo
- Location within Tatarstan
- Country: Russia
- Region: Tatarstan
- District: Ägerce District

Population (2002)
  - Total: 331
- Time zone: UTC+3:00

Yañawıl (Tatar: Яңавыл, romanized: Yañawıl) is a rural locality (a selo) in Ägerce District, Tatarstan. The population was 325 as of 2010. Yañawıl, Agryzsky District is located 40 km from Ägerce, district's administrative centre, and 291 km from Ԛazan, republic's capital, by road. The village was established in 1929. There are 3 streets in the village.
