= Yañasala, Arsky District =

Yañasala Яңасала
- selo
- Location within Tatarstan
- Country: Russia
- Region: Tatarstan
- District: Arça District
- Municipality: Yañasala rural settlement
- Time zone: UTC+3:00

Yañasala (Tatar: Яңасала, romanized: Yañasala) is a rural locality (a selo) in Arça District, Tatarstan. The population was 287 as of 2010. Yañasala, Arsky District is located 14 km from Arça, district's administrative centre, and 77 km from Ԛazаn, republic's capital, by road. The village already existed during the period of the Qazan Khanate. There are 4 streets in the village.
