= Äyşä =

Äyşä Әйшә
- selo
- Location within Tatarstan
- Country: Russia
- Region: Tatarstan
- District: Yäşel Üzän District

Population (2021)
  - Total: 3,204
- Time zone: UTC+3:00

Äyşä (Tatar: Әйшә, romanized: Äyşä) is a rural locality (a selo) in Yäşel Üzän District, Tatarstan. The population was 2939 as of 2010. Äyşä is located 9 km from Yäşel Üzän, district's administrative centre, and 35 km from Qazan, republic's capital, by road. The village was established in 1780. There are 18 streets in the village.
