= İske Äğbäz =

İske Äğbäz Иске Әгъбәз
- selo
- Location within Tatarstan
- Country: Russia
- Region: Tatarstan
- District: Aqtanış District
- Municipality: Aktanyshsky District
- Time zone: UTC+3:00

İske Äğbäz (Tatar: Иске Әгъбәз, romanized: İske Äğbäz) is a rural locality (a selo) in Aqtanış District, Tatarstan. The population was 304 as of 2010. İske Äğbäz is located 40 km from Aqtanış, district's administrative centre, and 357 km from Qazan, republic's capital, by road. The earliest known record of the settlement dates from 1731. There are 1 streets in the village.
