= Yuğarı Arbaş =

Yuğarı Arbaş Югары Арбаш
- derevnya
- Location within Tatarstan
- Country: Russia
- Region: Tatarstan
- District: Kukmara District
- Time zone: UTC+3:00

Yuğarı Arbaş (Tatar: Югары Арбаш, romanized: Yuğarı Arbaş) is a rural locality (a derevnya) in Kukmara District, Tatarstan. The population was 283 as of 2010. Yuğarı Arbaş is located 26 km from Kukmara, district's administrative centre, and 134 km from Ԛazan, republic's capital, by road. The earliest known record of the settlement dates from 1619. There are 1 streets in the village.
