= Qädräk =

Qädräk Кадрәк
- selo
- Location within Tatarstan
- Country: Russia
- Region: Tatarstan
- District: Minzälä District
- Time zone: UTC+3:00

Qädräk (Tatar: Кадрәк, romanized: Qädräk) is a rural locality (a selo) in Minzälä District, Tatarstan. The population was 241 as of 2010. Qädräk is located 26 kilometres (16 mi) from Minzälä, district's administrative centre, and 285 kilometres (177 mi) from Qazаn, republic's capital, by road. There are 3 streets in the village.
