= Tübän Poşalım =

Tübän Poşalım Түбән Пошалым
- derevnya
- Location within Tatarstan
- Country: Russia
- Region: Tatarstan
- District: Arça District
- Municipality: Ürnäk rural settlement
- Time zone: UTC+3:00

Tübän Poşalım (Tatar: Түбән Пошалым, romanized: Tübän Poşalım) is a rural locality (a derevnya) in Arça District, Tatarstan. The population was 260 as of 2010. Tübän Poşalım is located 17 km from Arçа, district's administrative centre, and 85 km from Ԛazаn, republic's capital, by road. The village was established in 17th century. There are 2 streets in the village.
