= Qızılyar, Zelenodolsky District =

Qızılyar Кызылъяр
- derevnya
- Location within Tatarstan
- Country: Russia
- Region: Tatarstan
- District: Yäşel Üzän District
- Time zone: UTC+3:00

Qızılyar (Tatar: Кызылъяр, romanized: Qızılyar) is a rural locality (a derevnya) in Yäşel Üzän District, Tatarstan. The population was 558 as of 2010. Qızılyar, Zelenodolsky District is located 10 km from Yäşel Üzän, district's administrative centre, and 39 km from Qazаn, republic's capital, by road. The village was established in 1920s. There are 7 streets in the village.
