= Olı Külbaş =

Olı Külbaş Олы Күлбаш
- selo
- Location within Tatarstan
- Country: Russia
- Region: Tatarstan
- District: Yäşel Üzän District
- Time zone: UTC+3:00

Olı Külbaş (Tatar: Олы Күлбаш, romanized: Olı Külbaş) is a rural locality (a selo) in Yäşel Üzän District, Tatarstan. The population was 255 as of 2010. Olı Külbaş is located 34 km from Yäşеl Üzän, district's administrative centre, and 43 km from Qаzаn, republic's capital, by road. The village was established in 17th century. There are 5 streets in the village.
