= Yaña Qomazan =

Yaña Qomazan Яңа Комазан
- selo
- Location within Tatarstan
- Country: Russia
- Region: Tatarstan
- District: Mamadış District
- Time zone: UTC+3:00

Yaña Qomazan (Tatar: Яңа Комазан, romanized: Yaña Qomazan) is a rural locality (a selo) in Mamadış District, republic of Tatarstan. The population was 443 as of 2010. Yaña Qomazan is located 20 km from Mamаdış, the district's administrative centre, and 184 km from Qazаn, the republic's capital, by road. The earliest known record of the settlement dates from 1710/1711. There are 8 streets in the village.
