= Mamadış-Äkil =

Mamadış-Äkil Мамадыш-Әкил
- selo
- Location within Tatarstan
- Country: Russia
- Region: Tatarstan
- District: Yäşel Üzän District
- Time zone: UTC+3:00

Mamadış-Äkil (Tatar: Мамадыш-Әкил, romanized: Mamadış-Äkil) is a rural locality (a selo) in Yäşel Üzän District, Tatarstan. The population was 430 as of 2010. Mamadış-Äkil is located 47 km from Yäşel Üzän, district's administrative centre, and 96 km from Ԛazan, republic's capital, by road. The earliest known record of the settlement dates from 1619. There are 5 streets in the village.
