= Buazkül =

Buazkül Буазкүл
- derevnya
- Location within Tatarstan
- Country: Russia
- Region: Tatarstan
- District: Aqtanış District
- Time zone: UTC+3:00

Buazkül (Tatar: Буазкүл, romanized: Buazkül) is a rural locality (a derevnya) in Aqtanış District, Tatarstan. The population was 335 as of 2010. Buazkül is located 27 km from Aqtanış, district's administrative centre, and 357 km from Qazan, republic's capital, by road. The village was established in 18th century. There are 5 streets in the village.
