= Düsmät =

Düsmät Дүсмәт
- selo
- Location within Tatarstan
- Country: Russia
- Region: Tatarstan
- District: Mamadış District
- Time zone: UTC+3:00

Düsmät (Tatar: Дүсмәт, romanized: Düsmät) is a rural locality (a selo) in Mamadış District, Tatarstan. The population was 327 as of 2010. Düsmät is located 19 kilometres (12 mi) from Mamadış, the district's administrative centre, and 186 km (116 mi) from Qazаn, the republic's capital, by road. The earliest known record of the settlement dates from 1710. There are 4 streets in the village.
