= Aydar, Zelenodolsky District =

Aydar Айдар
- derevnya
- Location within Tatarstan
- Country: Russia
- Region: Tatarstan
- District: Yäşel Üzän District
- Time zone: UTC+3:00

Aydar (Tatar: Айдар, romanized: Aydar) is a rural locality (a derevnya) in Yäşel Üzän District, Tatarstan. The population was 210 as of 2010. Aydar, Zelenodolsky District is located 45 km from Yäşel Üzän, district's administrative centre, and 90 km from Qazan, republic's capital, by road. The village was established in 17th century. There are 3 streets in the village.
