= Şiğäli, Vysokogrosky District =

Şiğali Шигали
- selo
- Location within Tatarstan
- Country: Russia
- Region: Tatarstan
- District: Biektaw District
- Time zone: UTC+3:00

Şiğali (Tatar: Шигали, romanized: Şiğali) is a rural locality (a selo) in Biektaw District, Tatarstan. The population was112as of 2010. Şiğäli is located 20 km west of Biektaw, district's administrative centre, and 25 km north of Qazan, republic's capital, by road.

The village was established in 1909-1910. It forms part of the district since 1965.

There are 8 streets in the village.
