= Naratlı, Bugulminsky District =

Naratlı Наратлы
- derevnya
- Location within Tatarstan
- Country: Russia
- Region: Tatarstan
- District: Bögelmä District
- Time zone: UTC+3:00

Naratlı (Tatar: Наратлы, romanized: Naratlı) is a rural locality (a derevnya) in Bögelmä District, Tatarstan. The population was 705 as of 2010. Naratlı is located 29 km from Bögelmä, district's administrative centre, and 334 km from Ԛazаn, republic's capital, by road. The village was established in 18th century. There are 7 streets in the village.
