= Tallı Büläk, Bugulminsky District =

Tallı Büläk Таллы Бүләк
- derevnya
- Location within Tatarstan
- Country: Russia
- Region: Tatarstan
- District: Bögelmä District
- Time zone: UTC+3:00

Tallı Büläk (Tatar: Таллы Бүләк, romanized: Tallı Büläk) is a rural locality (a derevnya) in Bögelmä District, Tatarstan. The population was 176 as of 2010. Tallı Büläk is located 6 km from Bögelmä, district's administrative centre, and 304 km from Ԛazаn, republic's capital, by road. The village was established in 1930s. There are 11 streets in the village.
