= Alğay =

Alğay Алгай
- selo
- Location within Tatarstan
- Country: Russia
- Region: Tatarstan
- District: Mamadış District
- Time zone: UTC+3:00

Alğay (Tatar: Алгай, romanized: Alğay) is a rural locality (a selo) in Mamadış District, Tatarstan. The population was 253 as of 2010. Alğay is located 42 km from Mаmаdış, district's administrative centre, and 203 km from Ԛazаn, republic's capital, by road. The village was established in 17th century. There are 3 streets in the village.
