= Çişmäbaş, Kukmorsky District =

Çişmäbaş Чишмәбаш
- selo
- Location within Tatarstan
- Country: Russia
- Region: Tatarstan
- District: Kukmara District
- Time zone: UTC+3:00

Çişmäbaş (Tatar: Чишмәбаш, romanized: Çişmäbaş) is a rural locality (a selo) in Kukmara District, Tatarstan. The population was 732 as of 2010. Çişmäbaş, Kukmorsky District is located 22 km from Kukmara, district's administrative centre, and 142 km from Ԛazan, republic's capital, by road. The village was established in 17th century. There are 8 streets in the village.
