= Kömeşkül =

Kömeşkül Көмешкүл
- selo
- Location within Tatarstan
- Country: Russia
- Region: Tatarstan
- District: Mamadış District
- Time zone: UTC+3:00

Kömeşkül (Tatar: Көмешкүл, romanized: Kömeşkül) is a rural locality (a selo) in Mamadış District, Tatarstan. The population was 305 as of 2010. Kömeşkül is located 40 km from Мamadış, district's administrative centre, and 201 km from Ԛazаn, republic's capital, by road. The earliest known record of the settlement dates from 1680. There are 3 streets in the village.
