= Unba =

Unba Өмбе
- Village
- Location within Tatarstan
- Coordinates: 56.084350°N 49.487021°E
- Country: Russia
- Region: Tatarstan
- District: Vysokogorsky District
- Time zone: UTC+3:00

Unba (Tatar: Өмбе, romanized: Ömbe; Russian: Уньба) is a rural locality (a village) in Vysokogorsky District, Tatarstan, Russia. The population was 158 as of 2010.

Unba is located 25 kilometres (16 mi) northeast of Vysokaya Gora, the district's administrative centre, and 51 kilometres (32 mi) north of Kazan, the republic's capital, by road.

The earliest known record of the settlement dates from the 17th century. It forms part of the district since 1965.

There are three streets in the village.
