= Bikbaw =

Bikbaw Бикбау
- derevnya
- Location within Tatarstan
- Country: Russia
- Region: Tatarstan
- District: Minzälä District
- Time zone: UTC+3:00

Bikbaw (Tatar: Бикбау, romanized: Bikbaw) is a rural locality (a derevnya) in Minzälä District, Tatarstan. The population was 551 as of 2010. Bikbaw is located 27 km from Мinzälä, district's administrative centre, and 321 km from Qazаn, republic's capital, by road. The earliest known record of the settlement dates from 17th century. There are 7 streets in the village.
