= Çapşar =

Çapşar Чапшар
- selo
- Location within Tatarstan
- Country: Russia
- Region: Tatarstan
- District: Baltaç District

Population (2015)
  - Total: 343
- Time zone: UTC+3:00

Çapşar (Tatar: Чапшар, romanized: Çapşar) is a rural locality (a selo) in Baltaç District, Tatarstan. The population was 313 as of 2010. Çapşar is located 7 km from Baltаç, district's administrative centre, and 108 km from Ԛazаn, republic's capital, by road. The village was established in 17th century. There are 3 streets in the village.
