= Börbaş Särdegäne =

Börbaş Särdegäne Бөрбаш Сәрдегәне
- derevnya
- Location within Tatarstan
- Country: Russia
- Region: Tatarstan
- District: Baltaç District
- Municipality: Börbaş Rural Settlement

Population (2010)
  - Total: 264
- Time zone: UTC+3:00

Börbaş Särdegäne (Tatar: Бөрбаш Сәрдегәне, romanized: Börbaş Särdegäne) is a rural locality (a derevnya) in Baltaç District, Tatarstan. The population was 265 as of 2010. Börbaş Särdegäne is located 18 km from Baltaç, district's administrative centre, and 120 km from Ԛazаn, republic's capital, by road. The village was established in 17th century. There are 4 streets in the village.
