= Urta Biräzä =

Urta Biräzä Урта Бирәзә
- selo
- Location within Tatarstan
- Country: Russia
- Region: Tatarstan
- District: Arça District
- Municipality: Nalasa rural settlement
- Time zone: UTC+3:00

Urta Biräzä (Tatar: Урта Бирәзә, romanized: Urta Biräzä) is a rural locality (a selo) in Arça District, Tatarstan. The population was 208 as of 2010. Urta Biräzä is located 5 km from Arça, district's administrative centre, and 69 km from Ԛazаn, republic's capital, by road. The earliest known record of the settlement dates from 1678. There are 4 streets in the village.
