= İske Aşıt =

İske Aşıt Иске Ашыт
- selo
- Location within Tatarstan
- Country: Russia
- Region: Tatarstan
- District: Arça District
- Municipality: Taşkiçü rural settlement
- Time zone: UTC+3:00

İske Aşıt (Tatar: Иске Ашыт, romanized: İske Aşıt) is a rural locality (a selo) in Arça District, Tatarstan. The population was 542 as of 2010. İske Aşıt is located 33 km from Arça, district's administrative centre, and 89 km from Ԛazаn, republic's capital, by road. The earliest known record of the settlement dates from 1615/1616. There are 3 streets in the village.
