= Ätnä =

Ätnä Әтнә
- selo
- Location within Tatarstan
- Country: Russia
- Region: Tatarstan
- District: Baltaç District
- Time zone: UTC+3:00

Ätnä (Tatar: Әтнә, romanized: Ätnä) is a rural locality (a selo) in Baltaç District, Tatarstan. The population was 271 as of 2010. Ätnä is located 38 km from Baltaç, district's administrative centre, and 141 km from Ԛazаn, republic's capital, by road. The earliest known record of the settlement dates from 1782. There are 3 streets in the village.
