= Tübän Sasna =

Tübän Sasna Түбән Сасна
- selo
- Location within Tatarstan
- Country: Russia
- Region: Tatarstan
- District: Baltaç District

Population (2017)
  - Total: 1,079
- Time zone: UTC+3:00

Tübän Sasna (Tatar: Түбән Сасна, romanized: Tübän Sasna) is a rural locality (a selo) in Baltaç District, Tatarstan. The population was 1050 as of 2010. Tübän Sasna is located 5 km from Baltaç, district's administrative centre, and 108 km from Ԛazаn, republic's capital, by road. The earliest known record of the settlement dates from 1619. There are 11 streets in the village.
