= Yuğarı Son =

Yuğarı Son Югары Сoн
- selo
- Location within Tatarstan
- Country: Russia
- Region: Tatarstan
- District: Mamadış District

Population (2010)
  - Total: 520
- Time zone: UTC+3:00

Yuğarı Son (Tatar: Югары Сoн, romanized: Yuğarı Son) is a rural locality (a selo) in Mamadış District, Tatarstan. The population was 520 as of 2010. Yuğarı Son is located 44 km from Mamadış, district's administrative centre, and 140 km from Ԛazаn, republic's capital, by road. The earliest known record of the settlement dates from 1619. There are 16 streets in the village.
