= Kiçketañ =

Kichketan Кичкетаң Kiçketañ
- selo
- Location within Tatarstan
- Country: Russia
- Region: Tatarstan
- District: Agryzsky District
- Municipality: Kiçketañ rural settlement

Population (2015)
  - Total: 531
- Time zone: UTC+3:00

Kichketan (Russian: Кичкетан, Tatar: Кичкетаң, romanized: Kiçketañ) is a rural locality (a selo) in Agryzsky District, Tatarstan. The population was 673 as of 2010. Kichketan is located 70 km from Agryz, district's administrative centre, and 282 km from Kazan, republic's capital, by road. The earliest known record of the settlement dates from 1629. There are 10 streets in the village.
