= Xucamät =

Xucamät Хуҗамәт
- selo
- Location within Tatarstan Location within Russia
- Coordinates: 55°38′00″N 52°45′17″E
- Country: Russia
- Region: Tatarstan
- District: Minzälä District
- Time zone: UTC+3:00

Xucamät (Tatar: Хуҗамәт, romanized: Xucamät) is a rural locality (a selo) in Minzälä District, Tatarstan. The population was 786 as of 2010. Xucamät is located 24 km from Minzälä, district's administrative centre, and 265 km from Qazаn, republic's capital, by road. The earliest known record of the settlement dates from 1734. There are 9 streets in the village.
