= Gölek =

Gölek Гөлек
- selo
- Location within Tatarstan
- Country: Russia
- Region: Tatarstan
- District: Minzälä District
- Time zone: UTC+3:00

Gölek (Tatar: Гөлек, romanized: Gölek) is a rural locality (a selo) in Minzälä District, Tatarstan. The population was 374 as of 2010. Gölek is located 16 km from Мinzälä, district's administrative centre, and 284 km from Qazаn, republic's capital, by road. The earliest known record of the settlement dates from 17th century. There are 9 streets in the village.
