= İj-Bäyki =

Izh-Bayki Иж-Бәйки İj-Bäyki
- selo
- Location within Tatarstan
- Country: Russia
- Region: Tatarstan
- District: Agryzsky District

Population (2010)
  - Total: 237
- Time zone: UTC+3:00

Izh-Bayki (Russian: Иж-Байки, Tatar: Иж-Бәйки, romanized: İj-Bäyki) is a rural locality (a selo) in Agryzsky District, Tatarstan. The population was 237 as of 2010. Izh-Bayki is located 12 km from Agryz, district's administrative centre, and 306 km from Kazan, republic's capital, by road. The earliest known record of the settlement dates from 1640. There are 3 streets in the village.
