= İske Teläkäy =

İske Teläkäy Иске Теләкәй
- selo
- Location within Tatarstan
- Country: Russia
- Region: Tatarstan
- District: Aqtanış District
- Time zone: UTC+3:00

İske Teläkäy (Tatar: Иске Теләкәй, romanized: İske Teläkäy) is a rural locality (a selo) in Aqtanış District, Tatarstan. The population was 387 as of 2010. İske Teläkäy is located 15 km from Aqtanış, district's administrative centre, and 351 km from Qazan, republic's capital, by road. The earliest known record of the settlement dates from 1724. There are 6 streets in the village.
