= Urıs-Tatar Äyşäse =

Urıs-Tatar Äyşäse Урыс-Татар Әйшәсе
- derevnya
- Location within Tatarstan
- Country: Russia
- Region: Tatarstan
- District: Biektaw District
- Time zone: UTC+3:00

Urıs-Tatar Äyşäse (Tatar: Урыс-Татар Әйшәсе, romanized: Urıs-Tatar Äyşäse) is a rural locality (a derevnya) in Biektaw District, Tatarstan. The population was 31 as of 2010. Urıs-Tatar Äyşäse is located 22 km north of Biektaw, district's administrative centre, and 54 km north of Qazan, republic's capital, by road.

The village was created in 1991 by merging two neighboring villages.

There are 3 streets in the village.
