= Yuğarı Çura =

Yuğarı Çura Югары Чура
- selo
- Location within Tatarstan
- Country: Russia
- Region: Tatarstan
- District: Kukmara District
- Time zone: UTC+3:00

Yuğarı Çura (Tatar: Югары Чура, romanized: Yuğarı Çura) is a rural locality (a selo) in Kukmara District, Tatarstan. The population was 622 as of 2010. Yuğarı Çura is located 30 km from Kukmara, district's administrative centre, and 125 km from Ԛazan, republic's capital, by road. The earliest known record of the settlement dates from 1711. There are 7 streets in the village.
