= Taşlı Yılğa =

Taşlı Yılğa Ташлы Елга
- selo
- Location within Tatarstan
- Country: Russia
- Region: Tatarstan
- District: Kukmara District
- Time zone: UTC+3:00

Taşlı Yılğa (Tatar: Ташлы Елга, romanized: Taşlı Yılğa) is a rural locality (a selo) in Kukmara District, Tatarstan. The population was 390 as of 2010. Taşlı Yılğa is located 27 km from Kukmara, district's administrative centre, and 170 km from Ԛazan, republic's capital, by road. The village was established in 17th century. There are 4 streets in the village.
