= Mämsä =

Mämsä Мәмсә
- selo
- Location within Tatarstan
- Country: Russia
- Region: Tatarstan
- District: Arça District
- Municipality: Taşkiçü rural settlement
- Time zone: UTC+3:00

Mämsä (Tatar: Мәмсә, romanized: Mämsä) is a rural locality (a selo) in Arça District, Tatarstan. The population was 371 as of 2010. Mämsä is located 35 km from Arça, district's administrative centre, and 94 km from Ԛazаn, republic's capital, by road. The village was established in 17th century. There are 4 streets in the village.
