= Kili, Tatarstan =

Kili Кили
- selo
- Location within Tatarstan
- Country: Russia
- Region: Tatarstan
- District: Baltaç District
- Time zone: UTC+3:00

Kili (Tatar: Кили, romanized: Kili) is a rural locality (a selo) in Baltaç District, Tatarstan. The population was 357 as of 2010. Kili is located 9 km from Baltaç, the district's administrative centre, and 110 km from Ԛazаn, the capital of the Republic of Tatarstan, by road. The earliest known record of the settlement dates from 1678. There are four streets in the village.
