= Quyan, Aktanyshsky District =

Quyan Куян
- selo
- Location within Tatarstan
- Country: Russia
- Region: Tatarstan
- District: Aqtanış District
- Time zone: UTC+3:00

Quyan (Tatar: Куян, romanized: Quyan) is a rural locality (a selo) in Aqtanış District, Tatarstan. The population was 249 as of 2010. Quyan, Aktanyshsky District is located 5 km from Aqtanış, district's administrative centre, and 364 km from Qazan, republic's capital, by road. The earliest known record of the settlement dates from 1780. There are 2 streets in the village.
