= Qursa Poçmaq =

Qursa Poçmaq Курса Почмак
- selo
- Location within Tatarstan
- Country: Russia
- Region: Tatarstan
- District: Arça District
- Municipality: Sece rural settlement

Population (2010)
  - Total: 521
- Time zone: UTC+3:00

Qursa Poçmaq (Tatar: Курса Почмак, romanized: Qursa Poçmaq) is a rural locality (a selo) in Arça District, Tatarstan. The population was 407 as of 2010. Qursa Poçmaq is located 16 kilometres (10 mi) from Arça, district's administrative centre, and 82 kilometres (51 mi) from Ԛazаn, republic's capital, by road. The village was established in 17th century. There are 5 streets in the village.
