= Urmançı, Vysokogorsky District =

Urmançı Урманчы
- posyolok
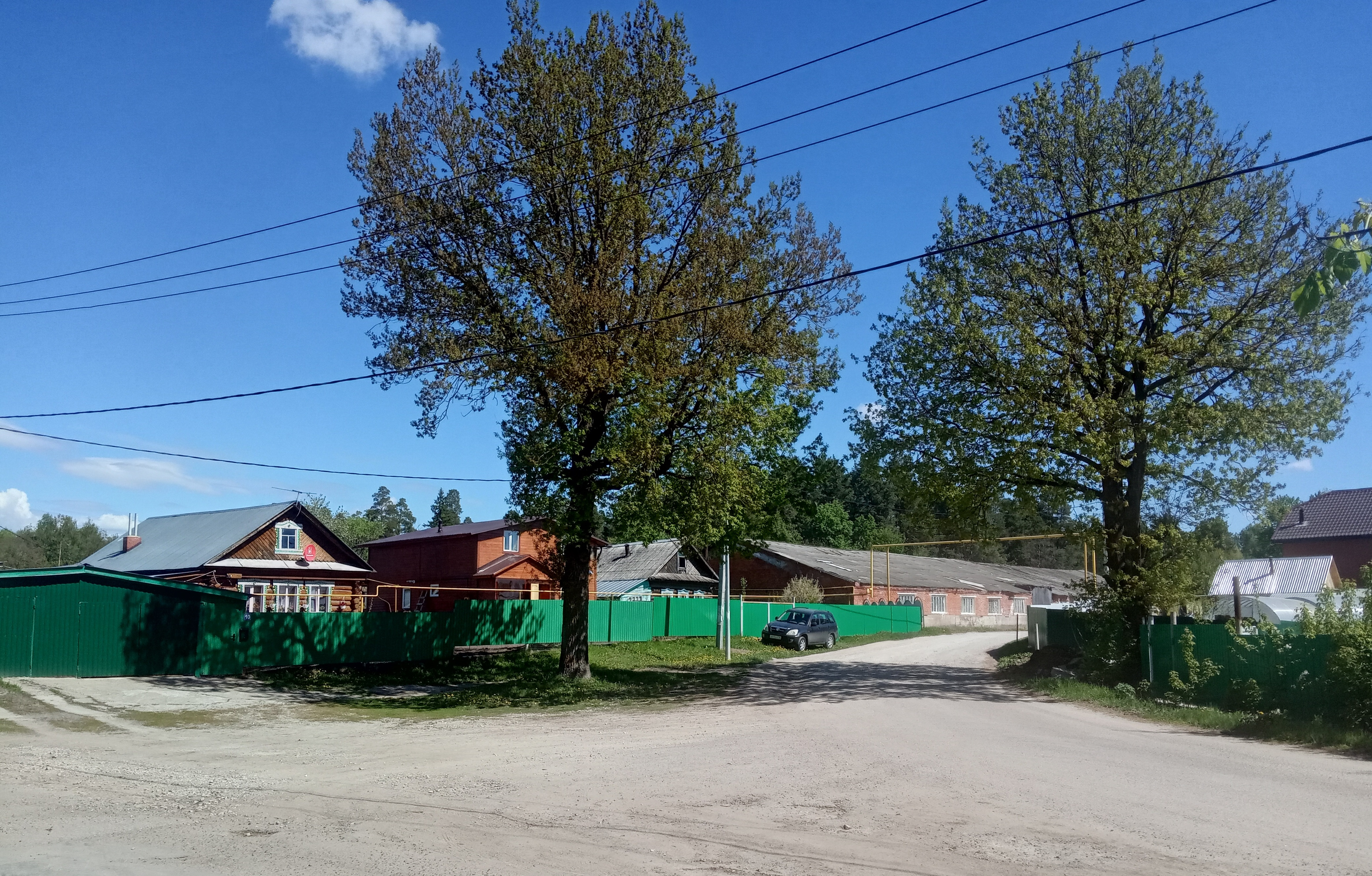

- Location within Tatarstan
- Country: Russia
- Region: Tatarstan
- District: Biektaw District
- Time zone: UTC+3:00

Urmançı (Tatar: Урманчы, romanized: Urmançı) is a rural locality (a posyolok) in Biektaw District, Tatarstan, Russia. The population was 234 as of 2010.

== Geography ==
Urmançı is located 5 km southwest of Biektaw, district's administrative centre, and 25 km northeast of Qazan, republic's capital, by road.

== History ==
The village was established in 2001.

Since its establishment is a part of Biektaw district.
