= İske Qomazan =

İske Qomazan Иске Комазан
- selo
- Location within Tatarstan
- Country: Russia
- Region: Tatarstan
- District: Mamadış District
- Time zone: UTC+3:00

İske Qomazan (Tatar: Иске Комазан, romanized: İske Qomazan) is a rural locality (a selo) in Mamadış District, Tatarstan. The population was 488 as of 2010. İske Qomazan is located 16 km from Mamadış, district's administrative centre, and 182 km from Ԛazаn, republic's capital, by road. The earliest known record of the settlement dates from 1680. There are 9 streets in the village.
