= Yuğarı Uşma =

Yuğarı Uşma Югары Ушма
- selo
- Location within Tatarstan
- Country: Russia
- Region: Tatarstan
- District: Mamadış District
- Time zone: UTC+3:00

Yuğarı Uşma (Tatar: Югары Ушма, romanized: Yuğarı Uşma) is a rural locality (a selo) in Mamadış District, Tatarstan. The population was 460 as of 2010. Yuğarı Uşma is located 18 km from Mamadış, district's administrative centre, and 180 km from Qazаn, republic's capital, by road. The village was established in 17th century. There are 6 streets in the village.
