= Manzaras =

Manzaras Манзарас
- selo
- Location within Tatarstan
- Country: Russia
- Region: Tatarstan
- District: Kukmara District
- Time zone: UTC+3:00

Manzaras (Tatar: Манзарас, romanized: Manzaras) is a rural locality (a selo) in Kukmara District, Tatarstan. The population was 864 as of 2010. Manzaras is located 2 km from Kukmara, district's administrative centre, and 164 km from Ԛazan, republic's capital, by road. The earliest known record of the settlement dates from 1678. There are 27 streets in the village.
