= Çutay =

Çutay Чутай
- selo
- Location within Tatarstan
- Country: Russia
- Region: Tatarstan
- District: Baltaç District
- Time zone: UTC+3:00

Çutay (Tatar: Чутай, romanized: Çutay) is a rural locality (a selo) in Baltaç District, Tatarstan. The population was 475 as of 2010. Çutay is located 29 km from Вaltaç, district's administrative centre, and 133 km from Ԛazаn, republic's capital, by road. The earliest known record of the settlement dates from 1678. There are 7 streets in the village.
