= Inesh =

Rural locality in Biektaw, Tatarstan, Russia

Inesh Инеш
- Settlement
- Location within Tatarstan
- Coordinates: 55.888124°N 49.364168°E
- Country: Russia
- Region: Tatarstan
- District: Vysokogorsky District
- Time zone: UTC+3:00

Inesh (Tatar: Инеш, romanized: İneş; Russian: Инеш) is a rural locality (a settlement) in Vysokogorsky District, Tatarstan, Russia. The population was 486 as of 2010.

== Geography ==
Inesh is located 1.5 kilometres (0.93 mi) southeast of Vysokaya Gora, the district's administrative centre, and 27 kilometres (17 mi) northeast of Kazan, the republic's capital, by road.

== History ==
The village was established in 1997.

Since its establishment is a part of Vysokogorsky District.
