= Şoda =

Şoda Шода
- selo
- Location within Tatarstan
- Country: Russia
- Region: Tatarstan
- District: Baltaç District
- Time zone: UTC+3:00

Şoda (Tatar: Шода, romanized: Şoda) is a rural locality (a selo) in Baltaç District, Tatarstan. The population was 331 as of 2010. Şoda is located 40 km from Baltaç, district's administrative centre, and 145 km from Ԛazаn, republic's capital, by road. The village was established in 17th century. There are 3 streets in the village.
