= Törkäş =

Törkäş Төркәш
- selo
- Location within Tatarstan
- Country: Russia
- Region: Tatarstan
- District: Kukmara District
- Time zone: UTC+3:00

Törkäş (Tatar: Төркәш, romanized: Törkäş) is a rural locality (a selo) in Kukmara District, Tatarstan. The population was 270 as of 2010. Törkäş is located 29 km from Kukmara, district's administrative centre, and 135 km from Ԛazan, republic's capital, by road. The earliest known record of the settlement dates from 1678. There are 3 streets in the village.
