= Qadıbaş =

Qadıbaş Кадыбаш
- selo
- Location within Tatarstan
- Country: Russia
- Region: Tatarstan
- District: Ägerce District

Population (2002)
  - Total: 491
- Time zone: UTC+3:00

Qadıbaş (Tatar: Кадыбаш, romanized: Qadıbaş) is a rural locality (a selo) in Ägerce District, Tatarstan. The population was 482 as of 2010. Qadıbaş is located 75 km from Ägerce, district's administrative centre, and 344 km from Ԛazan, republic's capital, by road. The earliest known record of the settlement dates from 16th century. There are 8 streets in the village.
