= Olı Klüçä =

Olı Klüçä Олы Клүчә
- selo
- Location within Tatarstan
- Country: Russia
- Region: Tatarstan
- District: Yäşel Üzän District

Population (2016)
  - Total: 2,045
- Time zone: UTC+3:00

Olı Klüçä (Tatar: Олы Клүчә, romanized: Olı Klüçä) is a rural locality (a selo) in Yäşel Üzän District, Tatarstan. The population was 1727 as of 2010. Olı Klüçä is located 27 km from Yäşel Üzän, district's administrative centre, and 38 km from Qazan, republic's capital, by road. The village was established in 17th century. There are 45 streets in the village.
