= Albay, Tatarstan =

Albay Албай
- selo
- Location within Tatarstan
- Country: Russia
- Region: Tatarstan
- District: Mamadış District
- Time zone: UTC+3:00

Albay (Tatar: Албай, romanized: Albay) is a rural locality (a selo) in Mamadış District, Tatarstan. The population was 232 as of 2010. Albay, Tatarstan is located 57 km from Mamаdış, district's administrative centre, and 135 km from Ԛazаn, republic's capital, by road. The village was established in 17th century. There are 4 streets in the village.
