= Çalmanarat =

Çalmanarat Чалманарат
- selo
- Location within Tatarstan
- Country: Russia
- Region: Tatarstan
- District: Aqtanış District
- Time zone: UTC+3:00

Çalmanarat (Tatar: Чалманарат, romanized: Çalmanarat) is a rural locality (a selo) in Aqtanış District, Tatarstan. The population was 305 as of 2010. Çalmanarat is located 20 km from Aqtanış, district's administrative centre, and 358 km from Qazan, republic's capital, by road. The village was established in 18th century. There are 5 streets in the village.
