= İske Baysar =

İske Baysar Иске Байсар
- selo
- Location within Tatarstan
- Country: Russia
- Region: Tatarstan
- District: Aqtanış District
- Time zone: UTC+3:00

İske Baysar (Tatar: Иске Байсар, romanized: İske Baysar) is a rural locality (a selo) in Aqtanış District, Tatarstan. The population was 677 as of 2010. İske Baysar is located 30 km from Aqtanış, district's administrative centre, and 346 km from Qazan, republic's capital, by road. The village was established in 17th century. There are 10 streets in the village.
