= Tübän Uşma, Baltasinsky District =

Tübän Uşma Түбән Ушма
- derevnya
- Location within Tatarstan
- Country: Russia
- Region: Tatarstan
- District: Baltaç District
- Time zone: UTC+3:00

Tübän Uşma (Tatar: Түбән Ушма, romanized: Tübän Uşma) is a rural locality (a derevnya) in Baltaç District, Tatarstan. The population was 316 as of 2010. Tübän Uşma, Baltasinsky District is located 6 km from Baltaç, district's administrative centre, and 102 km from Ԛazаn, republic's capital, by road. The village was established in 18th century. There are 2 streets in the village.
