= Mäsäde =

Mäsäde Мәсәде
- derevnya
- Location within Tatarstan
- Country: Russia
- Region: Tatarstan
- District: Aqtanış District
- Time zone: UTC+3:00

Mäsäde (Tatar: Мәсәде, romanized: Mäsäde) is a rural locality (a derevnya) in Aqtanış District, Tatarstan. The population was 321 as of 2010. Mäsäde is located 23 km from Aqtanış, district's administrative centre, and 364 km from Qazan, republic's capital, by road. The village was established in 1927. There are 4 streets in the village.
