= Kundurla =

Kundurla Кондырлы
- Village
- Location within Tatarstan
- Coordinates: 56.112975°N 49.087172°E
- Country: Russia
- Region: Tatarstan
- District: Vysokogorsky District
- Time zone: UTC+3:00

Kundurla (Tatar: Кондырлы, romanized: Qondırlı; Russian: Кундурла) is a rural locality (a village) in Vysokogorsky District, Tatarstan, Russia. The population was 79 as of 2010. Kundurla is located 28 kilometres (17 mi) northwest of Vysokaya Gora, the district's administrative centre, and 56 kilometres (35 mi) north of Kazan, the republic's capital, by road. The earliest known record of the settlement dates from the 17th century. It forms part of the district since 1965. There are two streets in the village.
