= Tawastı Täkermän =

Tawastı Täkermän Тауасты Тәкермән
- selo
- Location within Tatarstan
- Country: Russia
- Region: Tatarstan
- District: Minzälä District
- Time zone: UTC+3:00

Tawastı Täkermän (Tatar: Тауасты Тәкермән, romanized: Tawastı Täkermän) is a rural locality (a selo) in Minzälä District, Tatarstan. The population was 344 as of 2010. Tawastı Täkermän is located 28 km from Minzälä, district's administrative centre, and 264 km from Qazаn, republic's capital, by road. The earliest known record of the settlement dates from 1748. There are 8 streets in the village.
