= Dewäternä =

Dewäternä Девәтернә
- selo
- Location within Tatarstan
- Country: Russia
- Region: Tatarstan
- District: Ägerce District

Population (2010)
  - Total: 469
- Time zone: UTC+3:00

Dewäternä (Tatar: Девәтернә, romanized: Dewäternä) is a rural locality (a selo) in Ägerce District, Tatarstan. The population was 469 as of 2010. Dewäternä is located 80 km from Ägerce, district's administrative centre, and 352 km from Ԛazan, republic's capital, by road. The village was established in 1622. There are 9 streets in the village.
