= Qaratmän =

Qaratmän Каратмән
- derevnya
- Location within Tatarstan
- Country: Russia
- Region: Tatarstan
- District: Yäşel Üzän District
- Time zone: UTC+3:00

Qaratmän (Tatar: Каратмән, romanized: Qaratmän) is a rural locality (a derevnya) in Yäşel Üzän District, Tatarstan. The population was 251 as of 2010. Qaratmän is located 37 km from Yäşel Üzän, the district's administrative centre, and 46 km from Qаzan, the republic's capital, by road. The earliest known record of the settlement dates from 1646. There are three streets in the village.
