= Dimeskäy =

Dimeskäy Димескәй
- selo
- Location within Tatarstan
- Country: Russia
- Region: Tatarstan
- District: Bögelmä District
- Time zone: UTC+3:00

Dimeskäy (Tatar: Димескәй, romanized: Dimeskäy) is a rural locality (a selo) in Bögelmä District, Tatarstan. The population was 606 as of 2010. Dimeskäy is located 27 km from Bögelmä, district's administrative centre, and 341 km from Ԛazаn, republic's capital, by road. The village was established in 18th century. There are 10 streets in the village.
