= Mulla İle =

Mulla İle Мулла Иле
- selo
- Location within Tatarstan
- Country: Russia
- Region: Tatarstan
- District: Yäşel Üzän District

Population (2022; 2021)
  - Total: 747
- Time zone: UTC+3:00

Mulla İle (Tatar: Мулла Иле, romanized: Mulla İle) is a rural locality (a selo) in Yäşel Üzän District, Tatarstan. The population was 430 as of 2010. Mulla İle is located 47 km from Yäşel Üzӓn, district's administrative centre, and 79 km from Qazan, republic's capital, by road. The earliest known record of the settlement dates from 1619. There are 8 streets in the village.
