= Yuğarı Täkermän =

Yuğarı Täkermän Югары Тәкермән
- selo
- Location within Tatarstan
- Country: Russia
- Region: Tatarstan
- District: Minzälä District
- Time zone: UTC+3:00

Yuğarı Täkermän (Tatar: Югары Тәкермән, romanized: Yuğarı Täkermän) is a rural locality (a selo) in Minzälä District, Tatarstan. The population was 524 as of 2010. Yuğarı Täkermän is located 30 km from Minzälä, district's administrative centre, and 261 km from Qazаn, republic's capital, by road. The earliest known record of the settlement dates from 1709. There are 12 streets in the village.
