= Tübän Qozğınçı =

Tübän Qozğınçı Түбән Козгынчы
- selo
- Location within Tatarstan
- Country: Russia
- Region: Tatarstan
- District: Mamadış District
- Municipality: Olıyaz rural settlement
- Time zone: UTC+3:00

Tübän Qozğınçı (Tatar: Түбән Козгынчы, romanized: Tübän Qozğınçı) is a rural locality (a selo) in Mamadış District, Tatarstan. The population was 282 as of 2010. Tübän Qozğınçı is located 28 km from Mamаdış, district's administrative centre, and 194 km from Qazаn, republic's capital, by road. The earliest known record of the settlement dates from 1619. There are 4 streets in the village.
