= Yuğarı Şön =

Yuğarı Şön Югары Шөн
- selo
- Location within Tatarstan
- Country: Russia
- Region: Tatarstan
- District: Kukmara District
- Time zone: UTC+3:00

Yuğarı Şön (Tatar: Югары Шөн, romanized: Yuğarı Şön) is a rural locality (a selo) in Kukmara District, Tatarstan. The population was 293 as of 2010. Yuğarı Şön is located 15 km from Kukmara, district's administrative centre, and 140 km from Ԛazan, republic's capital, by road. The village was established in 17th century. There are 3 streets in the village.
