= Yuğarı Poşalım =

Yuğarı Poşalım Югары Пошалым
- selo
- Location within Tatarstan
- Country: Russia
- Region: Tatarstan
- District: Arça District
- Municipality: Ürnäk rural settlement
- Time zone: UTC+3:00

Yuğarı Poşalım (Tatar: Югары Пошалым, romanized: Yuğarı Poşalım) is a rural locality (a selo) in Arça District, Tatarstan. The population was 359 as of 2010. Yuğarı Poşalım is located 19 km from Arça, district's administrative centre, and 91 km from Ԛazаn, republic's capital, by road. The earliest known record of the settlement dates from 1619. There are 5 streets in the village.
