= Norma, Baltasinsky District =

Norma Норма
- selo
- Location within Tatarstan
- Country: Russia
- Region: Tatarstan
- District: Baltaç District
- Time zone: UTC+3:00

Norma (Tatar: Норма, romanized: Norma) is a rural locality (a selo) in Baltaç District, Tatarstan. The population was 1264 as of 2010. Norma, Baltasinsky District is located 4 km from Baltaç, district's administrative centre, and 104 km from Ԛazаn, republic's capital, by road. The earliest known record of the settlement dates from 1664. There are 14 streets in the village.
