= Tübän Qursa =

Tübän Qursa Түбән Курса
- derevnya
- Location within Tatarstan
- Country: Russia
- Region: Tatarstan
- District: Arça District
- Municipality: Urta Qursa rural settlement
- Time zone: UTC+3:00

Tübän Qursa (Tatar: Түбән Курса, romanized: Tübän Qursa) is a rural locality (a derevnya) in Arça District, Tatarstan. The population was 226 as of 2010. Tübän Qursa is located 10 km from Arça, district's administrative centre, and 78 km from Kazan, republic's capital, by road. The earliest known record of the settlement dates from 1602/1603. There are 3 streets in the village.
