= Zur Särdek =

Zur Särdek Зур Сәрдек
- selo
- Location within Tatarstan
- Country: Russia
- Region: Tatarstan
- District: Kukmara District
- Time zone: UTC+3:00

Zur Särdek (Tatar: Зур Сәрдек, romanized: Zur Särdek) is a rural locality (a selo) in Kukmara District, Tatarstan. The population was 1019 as of 2010. Zur Särdek is located 20 km from Kukmara, district's administrative centre, and 145 km from Ԛazan, republic's capital, by road. The earliest known record of the settlement dates from 1678. There are 13 streets in the village.
