= Qaçqın =

Qaçqın Качкын
- derevnya
- Location within Tatarstan
- Country: Russia
- Region: Tatarstan
- District: Aqtanış District
- Time zone: UTC+3:00

Qaçqın (Tatar: Качкын, romanized: Qaçqın) is a rural locality (a derevnya) in Aqtanış District, Tatarstan. The population was 258 as of 2010. Qaçqın is located 53 km from Aqtanış, district's administrative centre, and 326 km from Qazan, republic's capital, by road. The earliest known record of the settlement dates from 1728. There are 3 streets in the village.
