= Naratlı Kiçü =

Naratlı Kiçü Наратлы Кичү
- selo
- Location within Tatarstan
- Country: Russia
- Region: Tatarstan
- District: Minzälä District
- Time zone: UTC+3:00

Naratlı Kiçü (Tatar: Наратлы Кичү, romanized: Naratlı Kiçü) is a rural locality (a selo) in Minzälä District, Tatarstan. The population was 327 as of 2010. Naratlı Kiçü is located 26 km from Мinzälä, district's administrative centre, and 276 km from Qazаn, republic's capital, by road. The earliest known record of the settlement dates from 1716. There are 9 streets in the village.
