= Keçe Ätnä =

Keçe Ätnä Кече Әтнә
- derevnya
- Location within Tatarstan
- Country: Russia
- Region: Tatarstan
- District: Ätnä District
- Time zone: UTC+3:00

Keçe Ätnä (Tatar: Кече Әтнә, romanized: Keçe Ätnä, Russian: Малая Атня) is a rural locality (a derevnya) in Ätnä District, Tatarstan. The population was 256 as of 2010.

== Geography ==
Keçe Ätnä is located 2 km south of Olı Ätnä, district's administrative centre, and 69 km north of Qazan, republic's capital, by road.

== History ==
The village already existed during the period of the Khanate of Qazan.Its name derives from the word keçe (little, small) and the oecnonym Ätnä.

From 18th to the first half of the 19th centuries village's residents belonged to the social estate of state peasants.

By the beginning of the twentieth century, village had a mosque, 3 windmills and 2 small shops.

Before the creation of the Tatar ASSR in 1920 was a part of Çar Uyezd of Qazan Governorate. Since 1920 was a part of Arça Canton; after the creation of districts in Tatar ASSR (Tatarstan) in Tuqay (later Ätnä) (1930–1959), Tuqay (former Qızıl Yul) (1959–1963), Arça (1963–1990) and Ätnä districts.
