= Yaña Cölbi =

Yaña Cölbi Яңа Җөлби
- derevnya
- Location within Tatarstan
- Country: Russia
- Region: Tatarstan
- District: Ätnä District
- Time zone: UTC+3:00

Yaña Cölbi (Tatar: Яңа Җөлби, romanized: Yaña Cölbi, Russian: Новая Юльба) is a rural locality (a derevnya) in Ätnä District, Tatarstan. The population was 94 as of 2010.

== Geography ==
Yaña Cölbi is located 10 km southeast of Olı Ätnä, district's administrative centre, and 86 km north of Qazan, republic's capital, by road.

== History ==
The village was established in the 18th century. Its name derives from the word yaña (new) and the oecnonym Cölbi.

From 18th to the first half of the 19th centuries village's residents belonged to the social estate of state peasants.

By the beginning of the twentieth century, village had a mosque, a madrasa, 3 windmills, a grain scourer and 4 small shops.

Before the creation of the Tatar ASSR in 1920 was a part of Çar Uyezd of Qazan Governorate. Since 1920 was a part of Arça Canton; after the creation of districts in Tatar ASSR (Tatarstan) in Tuqay (later Ätnä) (1930–1959), Tuqay (former Qızıl Yul) (1959–1963), Arça (1963–1990) and Ätnä districts.
