= Yaña Şaşı =

Yaña Şaşı Яңа Шашы
- Selo
- Location within Tatarstan
- Country: Russia
- Region: Tatarstan
- District: Ätnä District
- Time zone: UTC+3:00

Yaña Şaşı (Tatar: Яңа Шашы, romanized: Yaña Şaşı, Russian: Новые Шаши) is a rural locality (a selo) in Ätnä District, Tatarstan. The population was 196 as of 2010.

== Geography ==
Yaña Şaşı is located 40 km north of Olı Ätnä, district's administrative centre, and 103 km northeast of Qazan, republic's capital, by road.

== History ==
The village was established in 17th century. Its name derives from the word yaña (new) and the oecnonym Şaşı.

From 18th to the first half of the 19th centuries village's residents belonged to the social estate of state peasants.

By the beginning of the twentieth century, village had a mosque and 2 small shops.

Before the creation of the Tatar ASSR in 1920 was a part of Çar Uyezd of Qazan Governorate. Since 1920 was a part of Arça Canton; after the creation of districts in Tatar ASSR (Tatarstan) in Tuqay (1930–1935), Tuqay (former Qızıl Yul) (1935–1963), Arça (1963–1990) and Ätnä districts.
