= Yuğarı Şaşı =

Yuğarı Şaşı Югары Шашы
- derevnya
- Location within Tatarstan
- Country: Russia
- Region: Tatarstan
- District: Ätnä District
- Time zone: UTC+3:00

Yuğarı Şaşı (Tatar: Югары Шашы, romanized: Yuğarı Şaşı) is a rural locality (a derevnya (awıl)) in Ätnä District, Tatarstan. The population was 142 as of 2010.

== Geography ==
Yuğarı Şaşı is located 8 km north of Olı Ätnä, the district's administrative centre, and 85 km north of Qazan, the republic's capital, by road.

== History ==
The village was established in the 17th century. Its name derives from the word yuğarı (high, higher) and the hydronym Şaşı.

From the 18th to the first half of the 19th century village's residents belonged to the social estate of state peasants.

By the beginning of the twentieth century, the village had a mosque, a mekteb, a mill, and 2 small shops.

Before the creation of the Tatar ASSR in 1920 was a part of Çar Uyezd of Qazan Governorate. Since 1920 was a part of Arça Canton; after the creation of districts in Tatar ASSR (Tatarstan) in Tuqay (later Ätnä) (1930–1959), Tuqay (former Qızıl Yul) (1959–1963), Arça (1963–1990) and Ätnä districts.
