= Tübän Şaşı =

Tübän Şaşı Түбән Шашы
- derevnya
- Location within Tatarstan
- Country: Russia
- Region: Tatarstan
- District: Ätnä District
- Time zone: UTC+3:00

Tübän Şaşı (Tatar: Түбән Шашы, romanized: Tübän Şaşı) is a rural locality (a derevnya (awıl)) in Ätnä District, Tatarstan. The population was 426 as of 2010.

== Geography ==
Tübän Şaşı is located 8 km north of Olı Ätnä, district's administrative centre, and 86 km north of Qazan, republic's capital, by road.

== History ==
The village was established in the 17th century. Its name derives from the word tübän (lower) and the hydronym Şaşı.

From 18th to the first half of the 19th centuries village's residents belonged to the social estate of state peasants.

By the beginning of the twentieth century, village had a mosque and 3 small shops.

Before the creation of the Tatar ASSR in 1920 was a part of Çar Uyezd of Qazan Governorate. Since 1920 was a part of Arça Canton; after the creation of districts in Tatar ASSR (Tatarstan) in Tuqay (later Ätnä) (1930–1959), Tuqay (former Qızıl Yul) (1959–1963), Arça (1963–1990) and Ätnä districts.
