= Külle Kime =

Külle Kime Күлле Киме
- selo
- Location within Tatarstan
- Country: Russia
- Region: Tatarstan
- District: Ätnä District
- Time zone: UTC+3:00

Külle Kime (Tatar: Күлле Киме, romanized: Külle Kime, Russian: Кулле-Кими) is a rural locality (a selo) in Ätnä District, Tatarstan. The population was 371 as of 2010.

== Geography ==
Külle Kime is located 9 km northwest of Olı Ätnä, district's administrative centre, and 90 km north of Qazan, republic's capital, by road.

== History ==
The earliest known record of the settlement dates from 1701.

From 18th to the first half of the 19th centuries village's residents belonged to the social estate of state peasants.

By the beginning of the twentieth century, village had a mosque, a madrasa, a zemstvo hospital, a veterinary paramedic station, a blacksmith shop, a state-owned wine shop, two beer shops, a manufacturer, five small shops and a bazaar on Wednesdays.

Before the creation of the Tatar ASSR in 1920 was a part of Çar Uyezd of Qazan Governorate. Since 1920 was a part of Arça Canton; after the creation of districts in Tatar ASSR (Tatarstan) in Tuqay (1930–1935), Tuqay (former Qızıl Yul) (1935–1963), Arça (1963–1990) and Ätnä districts.
