= Dusım =

Dusım Дусым
- derevnya
- Location within Tatarstan
- Country: Russia
- Region: Tatarstan
- District: Ätnä District
- Time zone: UTC+3:00

Dusım (Tatar: Дусым, romanized: Dusım, Russian: Дусюм) is a rural locality (a derevnya) in Ätnä District, Tatarstan. The population was 206 as of 2010.

== Geography ==
Dusım is located 10 km northwest of Olı Ätnä, district's administrative centre, and 85 km north of Qazan, republic's capital, by road.

== History ==
The earliest known record of the settlement dates from 1619.

From 18th to the first half of the 19th centuries village's residents belonged to the social estate of state peasants.

By the beginning of the twentieth century, village had a mosque, a mekteb and 2 small shops.

Before the creation of the Tatar ASSR in 1920 was a part of Çar Uyezd of Qazan Governorate. Since 1920 was a part of Arça Canton; after the creation of districts in Tatar ASSR (Tatarstan) in Tuqay (later Ätnä) (1930–1959), Tuqay (former Qızıl Yul) (1959–1963), Arça (1963–1990) and Ätnä districts.
