= Çımbulat =

Çımbulat Чымбулат
- derevnya
- Location within Tatarstan
- Country: Russia
- Region: Tatarstan
- District: Atninsky District
- Time zone: UTC+3:00

Çımbulat (Tatar: Чымбулат, romanized: Çımbulat, Russian: Чембулат) is a rural locality (a derevnya) in Atninsky District, Tatarstan. The population was 117 as of 2010.

== Geography ==
Çımbulat is located 29 km north of Olı Ätnä, district's administrative centre, and 97 km northeast of Qazan, republic's capital, by road.

== History ==
The village was established in 17th century.

From 18th to the first half of the 19th centuries village's residents belonged to the social estate of state peasants.

By the beginning of the twentieth century, village had 2 mosques and 5 small shops.

Before the creation of the Tatar ASSR in 1920 was a part of Çar Uyezd of Qazan Governorate. Since 1920 was a part of Arça Canton; after the creation of districts in Tatar ASSR (Tatarstan) in Tuqay (1930–1935), Tuqay (former Qızıl Yul) (1935–1963), Arça (1963–1990) and Ätnä districts.
