= Qızıl Utar =

Qızıl Utar Кызыл Утар
- derevnya
- Location within Tatarstan
- Country: Russia
- Region: Tatarstan
- District: Atninsky District
- Time zone: UTC+3:00

Qızıl Utar (Tatar: Кызыл Утар, romanized: Qızıl Utar, Russian: Кзыл-Утар) is a rural locality (a derevnya) in Atninsky District, Tatarstan. The population was 89 as of 2010.

== Geography ==
Qızıl Utar is located 12 km northeast of Olı Ätnä, district's administrative centre, and 95 km north of Qazan, republic's capital, by road.

== History ==
The earliest known record of the settlement dates from 1646. Its name derives from words qızıl (red) and utar (manor, estate).

From 18th to the first half of the 19th centuries village's residents belonged to the social estate of state peasants.

By the beginning of the twentieth century, village had a mosque and a small shop.

Before the creation of the Tatar ASSR in 1920 was a part of Çar Uyezd of Qazan Governorate. Since 1920 was a part of Arça Canton; after the creation of districts in Tatar ASSR (Tatarstan) in Tuqay (1930–1935), Tuqay (former Qızıl Yul) (1935–1963), Arça (1963–1990) and Ätnä districts.
