= Ayshiyaz =

Ayshiyaz Әйшияз
- derevnya
- Location within Tatarstan
- Country: Russia
- Region: Tatarstan
- District: Ätnä District
- Time zone: UTC+3:00

Äyşiyaz (Tatar: Әйшияз, romanized: Äyşiyaz, Russian: Айшияз) is a rural locality (a derevnya) in Atninsky District, Tatarstan. The population was 207 as of 2010.

== Geography ==
Ayshiyaz is located 11 km northwest of Bolshaya Atnya, district's administrative centre, and 87 km north of Kazan, republic's capital, by road.

== History ==
The village already existed during the period of the Khanate of Kazan.

From 18th to the first half of the 19th centuries village's residents belonged to the social estate of state peasants.

By the beginning of the twentieth century, village had 2 mosques, 2 watermills and 2 small shops.

Before the creation of the Tatar ASSR in 1920 was a part of Tsaryovokokshaysky Uyezd of Kazan Governorate. Since 1920 was a part of Arsk Canton; after the creation of districts in Tatar ASSR (Tatarstan) in Atninsky (1930–1959), Tukayevsky (1959–1963), Arsky (1963–1990) and Atninsky Districts.
