= Tübän Köyek =

Tübän Köyek Түбән Көек
- selo
- Location within Tatarstan
- Country: Russia
- Region: Tatarstan
- District: Ätnä District
- Time zone: UTC+3:00

Tübän Köyek (Tatar: Түбән Көек, romanized: Tübän Köyek) is a rural locality (a selo) in Ätnä District, Tatarstan. The population was 308 as of 2010.

== Geography ==
Tübän Köyek is located 15 km northwest of Olı Ätnä, district's administrative centre, and 90 km north of Qazan, republic's capital, by road.

== History ==
The earliest known record of the settlement dates from 1619. Its name derives from the words tübän (lower) and köyek (burnt place in the forest).

From 18th to the first half of the 19th centuries village's residents belonged to the social estate of state peasants.

By the beginning of the twentieth century, village had a mosque, a madrasa, a blacksmith shop and 2 small shops.

Before the creation of the Tatar ASSR in 1920 was a part of Çar Uyezd of Qazan Governorate. Since 1920 was a part of Arça Canton; after the creation of districts in Tatar ASSR (Tatarstan) in Tuqay (later Ätnä) (1930–1959), Tuqay (former Qızıl Yul) (1959–1963), Arça (1963–1990) and Ätnä districts.
