= Qomırğuca =

Qomırğuca Комыргуҗа
- selo
- Location within Tatarstan
- Country: Russia
- Region: Tatarstan
- District: Ätnä District
- Time zone: UTC+3:00

Qomırğuca (Tatar: Комыргуҗа, romanized: Qomırğuca) is a rural locality (a selo) in Ätnä District, Tatarstan. The population was 291 in 2010.

== Geography ==
Qomırğuca is located 12 km south of Olı Ätnä, district's administrative centre, and 59 km north of Qazan, republic's capital, by road.

== History ==
The village already existed during the period of the Khanate of Qazan. Its name derives from the anthroponym Qomırğuca.

From the 18th century until the first half of the 19th century, the village's residents belonged to the social estate of state peasants.

By the beginning of the twentieth century, the village had a mosque, four windmills, a blacksmith shop and three small shops.

Before the creation of the Tatar ASSR in 1920, the village was a part of Çar Uyezd of Qazan Governorate. Since 1920, the village was a part of Arça Canton after the creation of districts in Tatar ASSR (Tatarstan) in Tuqay (later Ätnä) (1930–1959), Tuqay (former Qızıl Yul) (1959–1963), Arça (1963–1990) and Ätnä districts.
