= Yaña Bäräskä =

Yaña Bäräskä Яңа Бәрәскә
- derevnya
- Location within Tatarstan
- Country: Russia
- Region: Tatarstan
- District: Ätnä District
- Time zone: UTC+3:00

Yaña Bäräskä (Tatar: Яңа Бәрәскә, romanized: Yaña Bäräskä, Russian: Новая Береске) is a rural locality (a derevnya) in Ätnä District, Tatarstan. The population was 40 as of 2010.

== Geography ==
Yaña Bäräskä is located 22 km northwest of Olı Ätnä, district's administrative centre, and 99 km north of Qazan, republic's capital, by road.

== History ==
The village was established in the end of the 18th century or in the beginning of the 19th century.

Until 1860-s village's residents belonged to the social estate of state peasants.

By the beginning of the twentieth century, village had a mosque and a small shop.

Before the creation of the Tatar ASSR in 1920 was a part of Çar Uyezd of Qazan Governorate. Since 1920 was a part of Arça Canton; after the creation of districts in Tatar ASSR (Tatarstan) in Tuqay (1930–1935), Tuqay (former Qızıl Yul) (1935–1963), Arça (1963–1990) and Ätnä districts.
