= Çişmäle Sap =

Çişmäle Sap Чишмәле Сап
- Selo
- Location within Tatarstan
- Country: Russia
- Region: Tatarstan
- District: Atninsky District
- Time zone: UTC+3:00

Çişmäle Sap (Tatar: Чишмәле Сап, romanized: Çişmäle Sap, Russian: Ключи-Сап) is a rural locality (a selo) in Atninsky District, Tatarstan. The population was 305 as of 2010.

== Geography ==
Çişmäle Sap is located 31 km north of Olı Ätnä, district's administrative centre, and 100 km northeast of Qazan, republic's capital, by road.

== History ==
The village was established in 17th century.

From 18th to the first half of the 19th centuries village's residents belonged to the social estate of state peasants.

By the beginning of the twentieth century, village had a mosque, 3 windmills, a blacksmith shop, a grain scourer and 4 small shops.

Before the creation of the Tatar ASSR in 1920 was a part of Çar Uyezd of Qazan Governorate. Since 1920 was a part of Arça Canton; after the creation of districts in Tatar ASSR (Tatarstan) in Tuqay (1930–1935), Tuqay (former Qızıl Yul) (1935–1963), Arça (1963–1990) and Ätnä districts.
