= Yuğarı Särdä =

Yuğarı Särdä Югары Сәрдә
- selo
- Location within Tatarstan
- Country: Russia
- Region: Tatarstan
- District: Ätnä District
- Time zone: UTC+3:00

Yuğarı Särdä (Tatar: Югары Сәрдә, romanized: Yuğarı Särdä, Russian: Верхняя Серда) is a rural locality (a selo) in Ätnä District, Tatarstan. The population was 182 as of 2010.

== Geography ==
Yuğarı Särdä is located 15 km southeast of Olı Ätnä, district's administrative centre, and 58 km north of Qazan, republic's capital, by road.

== History ==
The village already existed during the period of the Khanate of Qazan.

From 18th to the first half of the 19th centuries village's residents belonged to the social estate of state peasants.

By the beginning of the twentieth century, village had a mosque, 5 windmills, a blacksmith shop, 2 grain scourers and 3 small shops.

Before the creation of the Tatar ASSR in 1920 was a part of Çar Uyezd of Qazan Governorate. Since 1920 was a part of Arça Canton; after the creation of districts in Tatar ASSR (Tatarstan) in Tuqay (later Ätnä) (1930–1959), Tuqay (former Qızıl Yul) (1959–1963), Arça (1963–1990) and Ätnä districts.
