= Taşçişmä =

Taşçişmä Ташчишмә
- selo
- Location within Tatarstan
- Country: Russia
- Region: Tatarstan
- District: Ätnä District
- Time zone: UTC+3:00

Taşçişmä (Tatar: Ташчишмә, romanized: Taşçişmä, Russian: Таш-Чишма) is a rural locality (a selo) in Ätnä District, Tatarstan. The population was 366 as of 2010.

== Geography ==
Taşçişmä is located 12 km northeast of Olı Ätnä, district's administrative centre, and 90 km north of Qazan, republic's capital, by road.

== History ==
The village was established in 17th century. Its name derives from words taş (stone, stony) and çişmä (чишмә).

From 18th to the first half of the 19th centuries village's residents belonged to the social estate of state peasants.

By the beginning of the twentieth century, village had a mosque, a school, a watermill, a blacksmith shop and 2 small shops.

Before the creation of the Tatar ASSR in 1920 was a part of Çar Uyezd of Qazan Governorate. Since 1920 was a part of Arça Canton; after the creation of districts in Tatar ASSR (Tatarstan) in Tuqay (1930–1935), Tuqay (former Qızıl Yul) (1935–1963), Arça (1963–1990) and Ätnä districts.
