= Arı =

Arı Ары
- Selo
- Location within Tatarstan
- Country: Russia
- Region: Tatarstan
- District: Ätnä District
- Time zone: UTC+3:00

Arı (Tatar: Ары, romanized: Arı, Russian: Ислейтар) is a rural locality (a selo) in Ätnä District, Tatarstan. The population was 333 as of 2010.

== Geography ==
Arı is located 25 km northwest of Olı Ätnä, the district's administrative centre, and 99 km north of Qazan, the republic's capital, by road.

== History ==
The earliest known record of the settlement dates from 1710.

From 18th to the first half of the 19th centuries village's residents belonged to the social estate of state peasants.

By the beginning of the twentieth century, the village had a mosque, a windmill, a blacksmith shop and 4 small shops.

Before the creation of the Tatar ASSR in 1920, it was a part of Çar Uyezd of Qazan Governorate. Since 1920 was a part of Arça Canton; after the creation of districts in Tatar ASSR (Tatarstan) in Tuqay (1930–1935), Tuqay (former Qızıl Yul) (1935–1963), Arça (1963–1990) and Ätnä districts.
