= Cilgelde =

Cilgelde Җилгелде
- derevnya
- Location within Tatarstan
- Country: Russia
- Region: Tatarstan
- District: Ätnä District
- Time zone: UTC+3:00

Cilgelde (Tatar: Җилгелде, romanized: Cilgelde, Russian: Зильгильде) is a rural locality (a derevnya) in Ätnä District, Tatarstan. The population was 8 as of 2010.

== Geography ==
Cilgelde is located 3 km north of Olı Ätnä, district's administrative centre, and 87 km north of Qazan, republic's capital, by road.

== History ==
The village was established in the 18th century.

From 18th to the first half of the 19th centuries village's residents belonged to the social estate of state peasants.

By the beginning of the twentieth century, village had a mosque and a windmill

Before the creation of the Tatar ASSR in 1920 was a part of Çar Uyezd of Qazan Governorate. Since 1920 was a part of Arça Canton; after the creation of districts in Tatar ASSR (Tatarstan) in Tuqay (later Ätnä) (1930–1959), Tuqay (former Qızıl Yul) (1959–1963), Arça (1963–1990) and Ätnä districts.
