= Küñgär =

Küñgär Күңгәр
- selo
- Location within Tatarstan
- Country: Russia
- Region: Tatarstan
- District: Ätnä District
- Time zone: UTC+3:00

Küñgär (Tatar: Күңгәр, romanized: Küñgär) is a rural locality (a selo) in Ätnä District, Tatarstan. The population was 281 as of 2010.

== Geography ==
Küñgär is located 12 km north of Olı Ätnä, district's administrative centre, and 87 km north of Qazan, republic's capital, by road.

== History ==
The earliest known record of the settlement dates from 1678.

From the 18th to the first half of the 19th centuries, village's residents belonged to the social estate of state peasants.

By the beginning of the twentieth century, village had 2 mosques and 2 small shops.

Before the creation of the Tatar ASSR in 1920 was a part of Çar Uyezd of Qazan Governorate. Since 1920 was a part of Arça Canton; after the creation of districts in Tatar ASSR (Tatarstan) in Tuqay (later Ätnä) (1930–1959), Tuqay (former Qızıl Yul) (1959–1963), Arça (1963–1990) and Ätnä districts.
