= İske Coğıp =

İske Coğıp Иске Җогып
- derevnya
- Location within Tatarstan
- Country: Russia
- Region: Tatarstan
- District: Atninsky District
- Time zone: UTC+3:00

İske Coğıp (Tatar: Иске Җогып, romanized: İske Coğıp, Russian: Старый Югуп) is a rural locality (a derevnya) in Atninsky District, Tatarstan. The population was 162 as of 2010.

== Geography ==
İske Coğıp is located 27 km north of Olı Ätnä, district's administrative centre, and 95 km northeast of Qazan, republic's capital, by road.

== History ==
The village was established in 17th century.

From 18th to the first half of the 19th centuries village's residents belonged to the social estate of state peasants.

By the beginning of the twentieth century, village had a mosque and 2 small shops.

Before the creation of the Tatar ASSR in 1920 was a part of Çar Uyezd of Qazan Governorate. Since 1920 was a part of Arça Canton; after the creation of districts in Tatar ASSR (Tatarstan) in Tuqay (1930–1935), Tuqay (former Qızıl Yul) (1935–1963), Arça (1963–1990) and Ätnä districts.
