= Qayınsar, Atninsky District =

Qayınsar Каенсар
- selo
- Location within Tatarstan
- Country: Russia
- Region: Tatarstan
- District: Ätnä District
- Time zone: UTC+3:00

Qayınsar (Tatar: Каенсар, romanized: Qayınsar, Russian: Каенсар) is a rural locality (a selo) in Ätnä District, Tatarstan. The population was 119 as of 2010.

== Geography ==
Qayınsar, Atninsky District is located 12 km northwest of Olı Ätnä, district's administrative centre, and 87 km north of Qazan, republic's capital, by road.

== History ==
The earliest known record of the settlement dates from 1646. Its name derives from the words qayın (birch) and the hydronym sar (swamp, from Finno-Ugric languages).

From 18th to the first half of the 19th centuries village's residents belonged to the social estate of state peasants.

By the beginning of the twentieth century, village had a mosque and a mill

Before the creation of the Tatar ASSR in 1920 was a part of Çar Uyezd of Qazan Governorate. Since 1920 was a part of Arça Canton; after the creation of districts in Tatar ASSR (Tatarstan) in Tuqay (later Ätnä) (1930–1959), Tuqay (former Qızıl Yul) (1959–1963), Arça (1963–1990) and Ätnä districts.
