= Küäm =

Küäm Күәм
- selo
- Location within Tatarstan
- Country: Russia
- Region: Tatarstan
- District: Ätnä District
- Time zone: UTC+3:00

Küäm (Tatar: Күәм, romanized: Küäm, Russian: Кубян) is a rural locality (a selo) in Ätnä District, Tatarstan. The population was 774 as of 2010.

== Geography ==
Küäm is located 7 km northwest of Olı Ätnä, district's administrative centre, and 83 km north of Qazan, republic's capital, by road.

== History ==
The village already existed during the period of the Khanate of Qazan.

From 18th to the first half of the 19th centuries village's residents belonged to the social estate of state peasants.

By the beginning of the twentieth century, village had 4 mosques, a madrasa, 8 small shops and a bazaar on Tuesdays.

Before the creation of the Tatar ASSR in 1920 was a part of Çar Uyezd of Qazan Governorate. Since 1920 was a part of Arça Canton; after the creation of districts in Tatar ASSR (Tatarstan) in Tuqay (later Ätnä) (1930–1959), Tuqay (former Qızıl Yul) (1959–1963), Arça (1963–1990) and Ätnä districts.
