= Yaña Şimber =

Yaña Şimber Яңа Шимбер
- derevnya
- Location within Tatarstan
- Country: Russia
- Region: Tatarstan
- District: Ätnä District
- Time zone: UTC+3:00

Yaña Şimber (Tatar: Яңа Шимбер, romanized: Yaña Şimber) is a rural locality (a derevnya (awıl)) in Ätnä District, Tatarstan. The population was 60 as of 2010.

== Geography ==
Yaña Şimber is located 16 km west of Olı Ätnä, district's administrative centre, and 92 km north of Qazan, republic's capital, by road.

== History ==
The earliest known record of the settlement dates from 1724. Its name derives from the word yaña (new) and the oeconym Şimber.

From 18th to the first half of the 19th centuries village's residents belonged to the social estate of state peasants.

By the beginning of the twentieth century, village had a mosque and 2 small shops.

Before the creation of the Tatar ASSR in 1920 was a part of Çar Uyezd of Qazan Governorate. Since 1920 was a part of Arça Canton; after the creation of districts in Tatar ASSR (Tatarstan) in Tuqay (later Ätnä) (1930–1959), Tuqay (former Qızıl Yul) (1959–1963), Arça (1963–1990) and Ätnä districts.
