= Töreklär =

Töreklär Төрекләр
- derevnya
- Location within Tatarstan
- Country: Russia
- Region: Tatarstan
- District: Ätnä District
- Time zone: UTC+3:00

Töreklär (Tatar: Төрекләр, romanized: Töreklär) is a rural locality (a derevnya) in Ätnä District, Tatarstan. The population was 108 as of 2010.

== Geography ==
Töreklär is located 14 km east of Olı Ätnä, district's administrative centre, and 57 km north of Qazan, republic's capital, by road.

== History ==
The earliest known record of the settlement dates from 1646.

From 18th to the first half of the 19th centuries village's residents belonged to the social estate of state peasants.

By the beginning of the twentieth century, village had a mosque, 3 windmills, a blacksmith shop and 2 small shops.

Before the creation of the Tatar ASSR in 1920 was a part of Çar Uyezd of Qazan Governorate. Since 1920 was a part of Arça Canton; after the creation of districts in Tatar ASSR (Tatarstan) in Tuqay (later Ätnä) (1930–1959), Tuqay (former Qızıl Yul) (1959–1963), Arça (1963–1990) and Ätnä districts.
