= Bäxtiyar =

Bäxtiyar Бәхтияр
- derevnya
- Location within Tatarstan
- Country: Russia
- Region: Tatarstan
- District: Ätnä District
- Time zone: UTC+3:00

Bäxtiyar (Tatar: Бәхтияр, romanized: Bäxtiyar) is a rural locality (a derevnya) in Ätnä District, Tatarstan. The population was 200 as of 2010.

== Geography ==
Bäxtiyar is located 12 km southeast of Olı Ätnä, district's administrative centre, and 72 km north of Qazan, republic's capital, by road.

== History ==
The village was established in the 17th century. Its name derives from the anthroponym Bäxiyar.

From 18th to the first half of the 19th centuries village's residents belonged to the social estate of state peasants.

By the beginning of the twentieth century, village had a mosque, a mekteb, 2 windmills, 2 grain scourers and a small shop.

Before the creation of the Tatar ASSR in 1920 was a part of Çar Uyezd of Qazan Governorate. Since 1920 was a part of Arça Canton; after the creation of districts in Tatar ASSR (Tatarstan) in Tuqay (later Ätnä) (1930–1959), Tuqay (former Qızıl Yul) (1959–1963), Arça (1963–1990) and Ätnä districts.
