= Qışlaw =

Qışlaw Кышлау
- selo
- Location within Tatarstan
- Country: Russia
- Region: Tatarstan
- District: Atninsky District
- Time zone: UTC+3:00

Qışlaw (Tatar: Кышлау, romanized: Qışlaw, Russian: Кшклово) is a rural locality (a selo) in Atninsky District, Tatarstan. The population was 369

== Geography ==
Qışlaw is located 12 km north of Olı Ätnä, district's administrative centre, and 90 km north of Qazan, republic's capital, by road.

== History ==
The village was established in 17th century.

From 18th to the first half of the 19th centuries village's residents belonged to the social estate of state peasants.

By the beginning of the twentieth century, village had 2 mosques, a paramedic station, a store, 2 mills, an inn, 5 small shops and a bazaar on Tuesdays.

Before the creation of the Tatar ASSR in 1920 was a part of Çar Uyezd of Qazan Governorate. Since 1920 was a part of Arça Canton; after the creation of districts in Tatar ASSR (Tatarstan) in Tuqay (1930–1935), Tuqay (former Qızıl Yul) (1935–1963), Arça (1963–1990), and Ätnä districts.
