= Baxtaçı =

Baxtaçı Бахтачы
- derevnya
- Location within Tatarstan
- Country: Russia
- Region: Tatarstan
- District: Ätnä District
- Time zone: UTC+3:00

Baxtaçı (Tatar: Бахтачы, romanized: Baxtaçı, Russian: Бахтаче) is a rural locality (a derevnya) in Ätnä District, Tatarstan. The population was 51 as of 2010.

== Geography ==
Baxtaçı is located 18 km northwest of Olı Ätnä, district's administrative centre, and 116 km north of Qazan, republic's capital, by road.

== History ==
The village was established in the 16th century.

From 18th to the first half of the 19th centuries village's residents belonged to the social estate of state peasants.

By the beginning of the twentieth century, village had a mosque, a mekteb, 2 windmills, 2 manufactories and a small shop.

Before the creation of the Tatar ASSR in 1920 was a part of Çar Uyezd of Qazan Governorate. Since 1920 was a part of Arça Canton; after the creation of districts in Tatar ASSR (Tatarstan) in Tuqay (1930–1935), Tuqay (former Qızıl Yul) (1935–1963), Arça (1963–1990) and Ätnä districts.
