= İske Şimber =

İske Şimber Иске Шимбер
- derevnya
- Location within Tatarstan
- Country: Russia
- Region: Tatarstan
- District: Ätnä District
- Time zone: UTC+3:00

İske Şimber (Tatar: Иске Шимбер, romanized: İske Şimber) is a rural locality (a derevnya (awıl)) in Ätnä District, Tatarstan. The population was 49 as of 2010.

== Geography ==
İske Şimber is located 18 km west of Оlı Ätnä, district's administrative centre, and 93 km north of Qаzan, republic's capital, by road.

== History ==
The village was established in 17th century. Its name derives from the word iske (old) and the oeconym Şimber.

From 18th to the first half of the 19th centuries village's residents belonged to the social estate of state peasants.

By the beginning of the twentieth century, village had a watermill, a fabric factory and 2 small shops.

Before the creation of the Tatar ASSR in 1920 was a part of Çar Uyezd of Qazan Governorate. Since 1920 was a part of Arça Canton; after the creation of districts in Tatar ASSR (Tatarstan) in Tuqay (later Ätnä) (1930–1959), Tuqay (former Qızıl Yul) (1959–1963), Arça (1963–1990) and Ätnä districts.
