= Qazaq Ürtäme =

Qazaq Ürtäme Казак Үртәме
- derevnya
- Location within Tatarstan
- Country: Russia
- Region: Tatarstan
- District: Ätnä District
- Time zone: UTC+3:00

Qazaq Ürtäme (Tatar: Казак Үртәме, romanized: Qazaq Ürtäme, Russian: Нуртяк) is a rural locality (a derevnya) in Ätnä District, Tatarstan. The population was 94 as of 2010.

== Geography ==
Qazaq Ürtäme is located 13 km northwest of Olı Ätnä, district's administrative centre, and 91 km north of Qazan, republic's capital, by road.

== History ==
The village was established in the 18th century. Its name derives from that of the ethnosocial group qazaq and the hydronym Ürtäm.

From 18th to the first half of the 19th centuries village's residents belonged to the social estate of state peasants.

By the beginning of the twentieth century, village had a mosque and a small shop.

Before the creation of the Tatar ASSR in 1920 was a part of Çar Uyezd of Qazan Governorate. Since 1920 was a part of Arça Canton; after the creation of districts in Tatar ASSR (Tatarstan) in Tuqay (later Ätnä) (1930–1959), Tuqay (former Qızıl Yul) (1959–1963), Arça (1963–1990) and Ätnä districts.
