= Yuğarı Köyek =

Yuğarı Köyek Югары Көек
- selo
- Location within Tatarstan
- Country: Russia
- Region: Tatarstan
- District: Ätnä District
- Time zone: UTC+3:00

Yuğarı Köyek (Tatar: Югары Көек, romanized: Yuğarı Köyek) is a rural locality (a selo) in Ätnä District, Tatarstan. The population was 261 as of 2010.

== Geography ==
Yuğarı Köyek is located 18 km northwest of Olı Ätnä, district's administrative centre, and 91 km north of Qazan, republic's capital, by road.

== History ==
The village was established in the 17th century.Its name derives from the words yuğarı (high, higher) and köyek (burnt place in the forest).

From 18th to the first half of the 19th centuries village's residents belonged to the social estate of state peasants.

By the beginning of the twentieth century, village had a mosque, a windmill, a blacksmith shop, a manufactory and 2 small shops.

Before the creation of the Tatar ASSR in 1920 was a part of Çar Uyezd of Qazan Governorate. Since 1920 was a part of Arça Canton; after the creation of districts in Tatar ASSR (Tatarstan) in Tuqay (later Ätnä) (1930–1959), Tuqay (former Qızıl Yul) (1959–1963), Arça (1963–1990) and Ätnä districts.
