= Yaña Öcem =

Yaña Öcem Яңа Өҗем
- derevnya
- Location within Tatarstan
- Country: Russia
- Region: Tatarstan
- District: Atninsky District
- Time zone: UTC+3:00

Yaña Öcem (Tatar: Яңа Өҗем, romanized: Yaña Öcem, Russian: Новый Узюм) is a rural locality (a derevnya) in Atninsky District, Tatarstan. The population was 62 as of 2010.

== Geography ==
Yaña Öcem is located 15 km northeast of Olı Ätnä, district's administrative centre, and 94 km north of Qazan, republic's capital, by road.

== History ==
The village was established in 18th century.

From the 18th to the first half of the 19th centuries the village's residents belonged to the social estate of state peasants.

By the beginning of the twentieth century, the village had a mosque and 3 small shops.

Before the creation of the Tatar ASSR in 1920 was a part of Çar Uyezd of Qazan Governorate. Since 1920 was a part of Arça Canton; after the creation of districts in Tatar ASSR (Tatarstan) in Tuqay (1930–1935), Tuqay (former Qızıl Yul) (1935–1963), Arça (1963–1990) and Ätnä districts.
