= İske Öcem =

İske Öcem Иске Өҗем
- derevnya
- Location within Tatarstan
- Country: Russia
- Region: Tatarstan
- District: Ätnä District
- Time zone: UTC+3:00

İske Öcem (Tatar: Иске Өҗем, romanized: İske Öcem, Russian: Старый Узюм) is a rural locality (a derevnya) in Ätnä District, Tatarstan. The population was 196 as of 2010.

== Geography ==
İske Öcem is located 15 km northeast of Olı Ätnä, district's administrative centre, and 92 km north of Qazan, republic's capital, by road.

== History ==
The village already existed during the period of the Khanate of Qazan.

From 18th to the first half of the 19th centuries village's residents belonged to the social estate of state peasants.

By the beginning of the twentieth century, village had a mosque, a watermill and 3 small shops.

Before the creation of the Tatar ASSR in 1920 was a part of Çar Uyezd of Qazan Governorate. Since 1920 was a part of Arça Canton; after the creation of districts in Tatar ASSR (Tatarstan) in Tuqay (1930–1935), Tuqay (former Qızıl Yul) (1935–1963), Arça (1963–1990) and Ätnä districts.
