= Muqşı =

Muqşı Мокшы
- derevnya
- Location within Tatarstan
- Country: Russia
- Region: Tatarstan
- District: Ätnä District
- Time zone: UTC+3:00

Muqşı (Tatar: Мокшы, romanized: Muqşı, Russian: Мокша) is a rural locality (a derevnya) in Ätnä District, Tatarstan. The population was 196 as of 2010.

== Geography ==
Muqşı is located 9 km northeast of Olı Ätnä, district's administrative centre, and 88 km north of Qazan, republic's capital, by road.

== History ==
The earliest known record of the settlement dates from 1653.

From the 18th to the first half of the 19th centuries village's residents belonged to the social estate of state peasants.

By the beginning of the twentieth century, village had a mosque and a small shop.

Before the creation of the Tatar ASSR in 1920 was a part of Qazan Uyezd of Qazan Governorate. Since 1920 was a part of Arça Canton; after the creation of districts in Tatar ASSR (Tatarstan) in Tuqay (1930–1935), Tuqay (former Qızıl Yul) (1935–1963), Arça (1963–1990) and Ätnä districts.
