= Yana Kishet =

Yana Kishet Яңа Кишет
- Selo
- Location within Tatarstan
- Country: Russia
- Region: Tatarstan
- District: Arsky District
- Time zone: UTC+3:00

Yana Kishet (Tatar: Яңа Кишет, Yaña Kişet; Russian: Новый Кишит) is a rural locality (a selo) in Arsky District, Tatarstan. The population was 393 as of 2010.

== Geography ==
Yana Kishet is located on Simet River, 28 km northwest of Arça, district's administrative centre, and 94 km northeast of Qazan, republic's capital, by road.

== History ==
The village was established in 17th century: its name derives from the word yaña (new) and the oecnonym Kişet.

From 18th to the first half of the 19th centuries village's residents belonged to the social estate of state peasants.

By the beginning of the twentieth century, village had 2 mosques, 2 windmills, a 2 grain scourers and 4 small shops.

Before the creation of the Tatar ASSR in 1920 was a part of Qazan Uyezd of Qazan Governorate. Since 1920 was a part of Arça Canton; after the creation of districts in Tatar ASSR (Tatarstan) in Tuqay (later Ätnä) (1930–1959), Tuqay (former Qızıl Yul) (1959–1963) and Arça districts.
