= Yapançı =

Yapançı Япанчы
- selo
- Location within Tatarstan
- Country: Russia
- Region: Tatarstan
- District: Ätnä District
- Time zone: UTC+3:00

Yapançı (Tatar: Япанчы, romanized: Yapançı) is a rural locality (a selo) in Ätnä District, Tatarstan. The population was 5 as of 2010.

== Geography ==
Yapançı is located 16 km south of Olı Ätnä, district's administrative centre, and 54 km north of Qazan, republic's capital, by road.

== History ==
The village already existed during the period of the Khanate of Qazan. Its name derives from the anthroponym Yapançı.

From 18th to the first half of the 19th centuries village's residents belonged to the social estate of state peasants.

By the beginning of the twentieth century, village had a mosque, a blacksmith shop, a windmill and a watermill.

Before the creation of the Tatar ASSR in 1920 was a part of Çar Uyezd of Qazan Governorate. Since 1920 was a part of Arça Canton; after the creation of districts in Tatar ASSR (Tatarstan) in Tuqay (later Ätnä) (1930–1959), Tuqay (former Qızıl Yul) (1959–1963), Arça (1963–1990) and Ätnä districts.
