= Olı Öşkätä =

Olı Öşkätä Олы Өшкәтә
- derevnya
- Location within Tatarstan
- Country: Russia
- Region: Tatarstan
- District: Ätnä District
- Time zone: UTC+3:00

Olı Öşkätä (Tatar: Олы Өшкәтә, romanized: Olı Öşkätä) is a rural locality (a derevnya) in Ätnä District, Tatarstan. The population was 76 as of 2010.

== Geography ==
Olı Öşkätä is located 8 km southwest of Olı Ätnä, district's administrative centre, and 96 km north of Qazan, republic's capital, by road.

== History ==
The village already existed during the period of the Khanate of Qazan. Its name derives from the word yuğarı (high, higher) and the hydronym Şaşı.

From the 18th to the first half of the 19th centuries, the village's residents belonged to the social estate of state peasants.

By the beginning of the twentieth century, the village had a mosque, a madrasa, two weave matting establishments and six small shops.

Before the creation of the Tatar ASSR in 1920m the village was a part of Qazan Uyezd of Qazan Governorate. In 1920 it became a part of Arça Canton; after the creation of districts in Tatar ASSR (Tatarstan) in Tuqay (later Ätnä) (1930–1959), Tuqay (former Qızıl Yul) (1959–1963), Arça (1963–1990) and Ätnä districts.
