= Yaña Kenär =

Yaña Kenär Яңа Кенәр
- Selo
- Location within Tatarstan
- Country: Russia
- Region: Tatarstan
- District: Arsky District
- Time zone: UTC+3:00

Yaña Kenär (Tatar: Яңа Кенәр, romanized: Yaña Kenär, Russian: Новый Кинер) is a rural locality (a selo) in Arsky District, Tatarstan. The population was 869 as of 2010.

== Geography ==
Yaña Kenär is located 40 km north of Arça, district's administrative centre, and 103 km northeast of Qazan, republic's capital, by road.

== History ==
The village was established in 17th century; its name derives from the word yaña (new) and the oecnonym Kenär.

From 18th to the first half of the 19th centuries village's residents belonged to the social estate of state peasants.

By the beginning of the twentieth century, village had 4 mosques, 5 windmills, 3 blacksmith shops and 6 small shops.

Before the creation of the Tatar ASSR in 1920 was a part of Qazan Uyezd of Qazan Governorate. Since 1920 was a part of Arça Canton; after the creation of districts in Tatar ASSR (Tatarstan) in Tuqay (1930–1935), Tuqay (former Qızıl Yul) (1935–1963) and Arça districts.
