= Kachelino =

Kachelino Кәче
- Selo
- Location within Tatarstan
- Country: Russia
- Region: Tatarstan
- District: Arsky District
- Time zone: UTC+3:00

Kachelino (Tatar: Кәче, Käçe; Russian: Качелино) is a rural locality (a selo) in Arsky District, Tatarstan. The population was 869 as of 2010.

== Geography ==
Kachelino is located on the Qazansu River, 6 km southwest of Arça, the district's administrative centre, and 54 km northeast of Qazan, the republic's capital, by road.

== History ==
The earliest known record of the settlement dates from 1602.

From 18th to the first half of the 19th centuries village's residents belonged to the social estate of state peasants.

By the beginning of the twentieth century, village had 2 mosques, a madrasa, a watermill and 6 small shops.

Before the creation of the Tatar ASSR in 1920 was a part of Qazan Uyezd of Qazan Governorate. Since 1920 was a part of Arça Canton; after the creation of districts in Tatar ASSR (Tatarstan) in Arça district since 1930.

== Notable people ==
The village is a birthplace of Räfiq Yunıs, a writer.
