= Keçe Şırdan =

Keçe Şırdan Кече Шырдан
- Selo
- Location within Tatarstan
- Country: Russia
- Region: Tatarstan
- District: Yäşel Üzän District
- Time zone: UTC+3:00

Keçe Şırdan (Tatar: Кече Шырдан, romanized: Keçe Şırdan, Russian: Малые Ширданы) is a rural locality (a selo) in Yäşel Üzän District, Tatarstan. The population was 105 as of 2010.

== Geography ==
Keçe Şırdan is located 18 km southwest of Yäşel Üzän, district's administrative centre, and 69 km west of Qazan, republic's capital, by road.

== History ==
The village already existed during the period of the Khanate of Qazan.

From 17th to first half of the 19th centuries village's residents belonged to the social estate of state peasants.

By the beginning of the twentieth century, village had 5 mills, and 4 small shops.

Before the creation of Tatar ASSR in 1920 was a part of Zöyä Uyezd of Qazan Governorate. Since 1920 was a part of Zöyä Canton; after creation of districts in Tatar ASSR (Tatarstan) in Norlat-Açasır (later Norlat) (1927–1963) and Yäşel Üzän districts.

== Notable people ==
Keçe Şırdan is a birthplace of Qäyüm Nasıyri, educator, linguist, writer, historian and ethnographer, and Rezeda Ğänieva, a linguist.
