= Nizhnyaya Bereske Mosque =

Mosque in Tübän Bäräskä, Atninsky, Tatarstan, Russia

- Түбән Бәрәскә мәчете
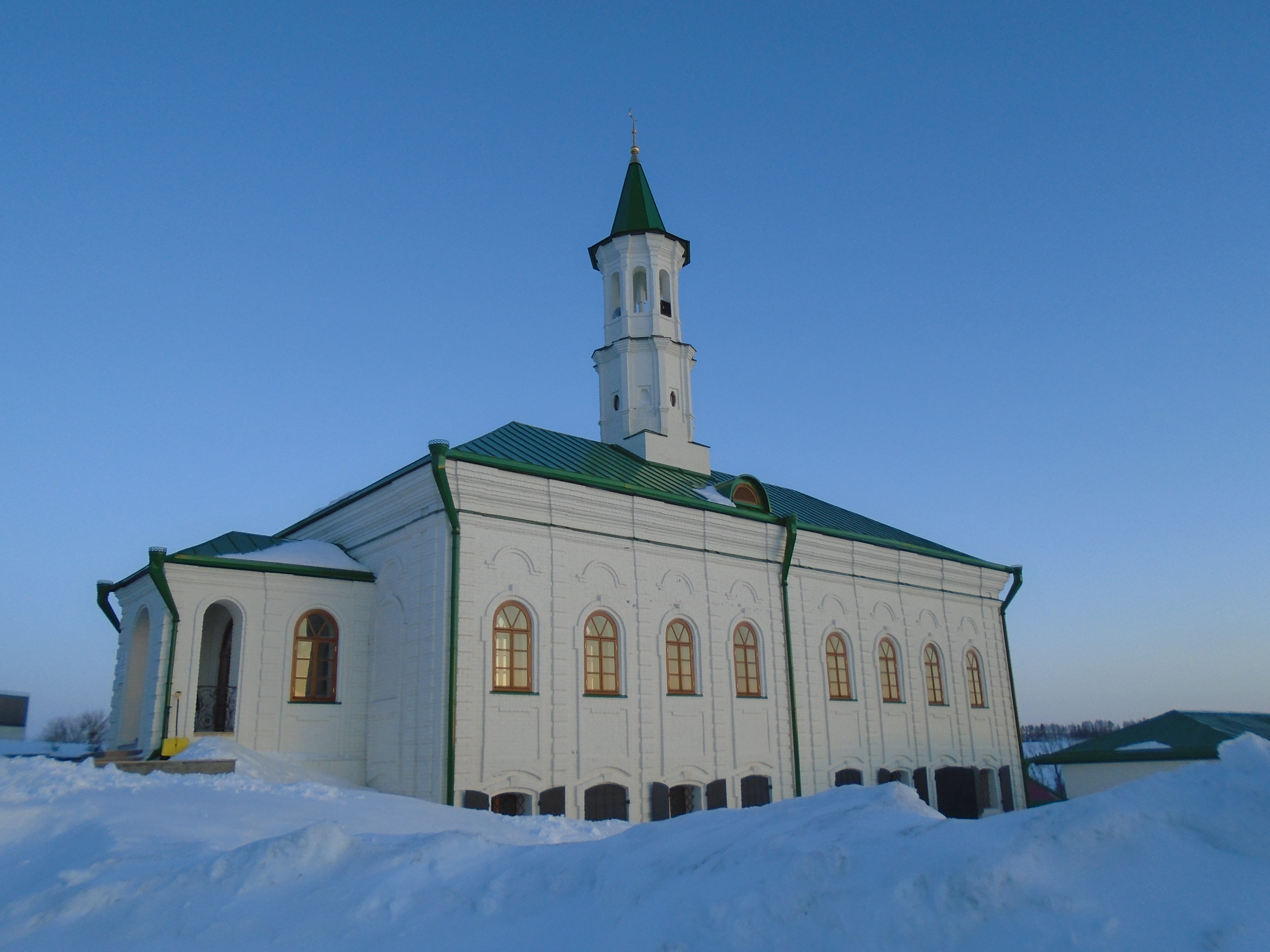

Religion
- Affiliation: Islam

Location
- Municipality: Tübän Bäräskä, Atninsky
- State: Tatarstan
- Country: Russia
- Interactive map of Nizhnyaya Bereske Mosque
- Coordinates: 56°14′06″N 49°20′12″E

Architecture
- Type: mosque
- Style: Petrine Baroque
- Founder: Ibrahim Burnaev
- Completed: 1769
- Minaret: 1

The Nizhnyaya Bereske Mosque (Tatar: Түбән Бәрәскә мәчете) is a mosque in Tübän Bäräskä, Atninsky District, Republic of Tatarstan, Russia.

== History ==
The mosque was originally constructed in 1769 which was initiated by Ibrahim Burnaev. During the Soviet Union, the mosque was used as a village club. The building was returned to the local Muslim community in 2010. In 2015 the building underwent examination for restoration work. The work started in 2018.

== Architecture ==
The mosque is a two-story building. It has two halls inside and a minaret. It was designed with Petrine Baroque architectural style.

== See also ==
- Islam in Russia
- List of mosques in Russia
