= Reşit Rahmeti Arat =

Tatarstan-born philologist, professor, writer and publisher

- Рәшит Рәхмәти Арат
- Born: Габдеррәшит Рәхмәтуллин; May 15, 1900; İske Öcem, Tsaryovokokshaysky Uyezd, Kazan Governorate, Russian Empire
- Died: November 29, 1964 (aged 64); Istanbul, Turkey
- Spouse: Rabia Hanım
- Children: 2

Reşit Rahmeti Arat (Tatar: Рәшит Рәхмәти Арат, Rəşit Rəxməti Arat – né Ğabderrəşit Rəxmətullin; May 15, 1900 - November 29, 1964) was a Turkish philologist, professor, writer and publisher of Tatar descent. He is considered to be the founder of philology in Turkey and a specialist of Old Uyghur language.

== Biography ==
Ğabderrəşit Rəxmətullin (later Reşit Rahmeti Arat), son of Ğismətulla, was born in İske Öcem, a village located approximately 50 km northwest of Kazan. From 1906 to 1910, he attended a primary school in his native village and after that, a secondary school in Petropavl. He continued his studies by taking private Russian language lessons, attending a business school and high school. During his last year in high school, after the October Revolution, Arat was taken to military school in order to join the army of Alexander Kolchak. Arat was wounded during war and after the defeat of Kolchak's army, he was transferred to Harbin, where he got medical treatment. In there, he also met many Tatars who had settled in the city. He ended up participating in activities with the Kazan Turks Association and his articles started appearing in their magazines. At the same time, he finished his high school in 1921. During his stay in Harbin, he got financial and spiritual help from imam Inayet Ahmedî and his childhood friend Hüseyin Abdüş.

Arat traveled to Germany in 1922, where by coincidence, he got to know a Polish Tatar named Yakup Şinkeviç, and partly due to this, started taking active roles in Turkic student associations. He wrote many articles in a magazine of Ayaz Ishaki, called Yaña Milli Yul. In 1923, Arat had begun studying for his doctorate at the philosophy faculty of Berlin University under Wilhelm Bang Kaup. He submitted his thesis in 1927, entitled Die Hilfsverben und Verbaladverbien im Altaischen (The Auxiliary Verbs and Verbal Adverbs in Altaic). The same year, he married a Tatar medical doctor named Rabia Hanım. Together, they had two children; daughters Süyüm (born 1931) and Aysu (born 1935).

In 1928, Arat was appointed as scientific assistant at the Berlin Academy of Science. Until year 1931, he worked under Bang Kaup, cataloging Old Uyghur manuscripts. He gained the position of Associate Professor (doçent) from this work. Next two years, he worked in the Berlin Eastern Languages Academy as an associate professor of the Language, Literature and History of Northern Turkish. Later in 1933, the newly founded Istanbul University invited him to join the Faculty of Letters as a professor of Turkish language. He continued given vocation until his death. Arat was elected a member of the Turkish Historical Society in 1942. During 1940–1950, he operated as the director of the Institute of Turkic Studies. In 1949–1950, he functioned as a quest-professor at the School of Oriental and African Studies in London.

In his final years, he searched for antiquities written in Arabic letters from Turkish libraries. He wanted to prepare a catalog to shed light on their chronological order.

== Publications ==
Between the years 1923 and 1933, Arat published multiple works: Die Legende von Oghuz Kaghan (with Wilhelm Bang Kaup), Das Buddhistische Sûtra Säkiz Yükmäk (also with Wilhelm Bang Kaup, though his classmate Anne-Marie von Gabain also contributed) and Türkische Turfan-Texte VII, which consists of 42 Old Uyghur texts on astronomy and astrology, published by Wolfram Eberhard, combined with his explanations of Chinese words in the texts.

Arat specialized in Old Uyghur language. He wanted to see Turkish philology be established on solid principles and thus in 1946 wrote a work that is fundamental on the subject; Türk ilmî transkripsiyon kılavuzu (“Turkish scientific transcription guide”).

The work that verified Arat's fame, which was also his first, was a publication called Kutadgu bilig. It is the oldest preserved Islamic-Turkish manuscript, whose 6645 couplets he reconstructed through comparing three separate manuscripts. The first volume, which contains the transcribed text, was published in 1947 and the second volume (a translation) in 1959. A third volume was published fifteen years after his death, in 1979, by Arat's students Kemal Eraslan, Osman Fikri Sertkaya, and Nuri Yüce. The second seminal publication from Arat was a volume formed of quatrains, Atebetü’l-hakayık, written by Edib Ahmed in Karakhanid (Hakaniye) Turkish. After comparing three full and two incomplete manuscripts, Arat reconstructed the text and published it in 1951, together with a translation, glossary and facsimiles. Third seminal work from Arat was Eski Türk Şiiri (“Old Turkish poems”), which contained 33 verse texts, written by Uyghurs. It was published by Arat's assistant, Muharrem Ergin in 1965, a year after his death. Third seminal work was Vakayi. Baburʾun Hatıratı (“Events. Babur’s life”), which was a translation of the memoirs of Babur from Chagatai Turkish. It was published in two volumes, first in 1943 and second in 1946; the linguistic explanations towards the end of given text are considered especially important.

Due to his death at the age of 64, many of Reşit Rahmeti Arat's works were left unfinished. A man who catalogued his estate, Osman Fikri Sertkaya, published Arat's articles in multiple periodicals and also in a 1987 book in Ankara, titled Makaleler. Cilt I (“Articles. Volume I”). It was followed by Doğu Türkçesi metinleri (“Eastern Turkish texts”) (Ankara 1987), Güney Sibirya Türkçesi metinleri (“Southern Siberian Turkish texts”) (Ankara 1994), and, in 2016, Kazakça metinler.
