= Yaña Ätnä =

Yaña Ätnä Яңа Әтнә
- derevnya
- Location within Tatarstan
- Country: Russia
- Region: Tatarstan
- District: Ätnä District
- Time zone: UTC+3:00

Yaña Ätnä (Tatar: Яңа Әтнә, romanized: Yaña Ätnä, Russian: Новая Атня) is a rural locality (a derevnya) in Ätnä District, Tatarstan. The population was 338 as of 2015.

== Geography ==
Yaña Ätnä is located 1 km northeast of Olı Ätnä, district's administrative centre, and 80 km north of Qazan, republic's capital, by road.

== History ==
The village was established in 1990s. Its name derives from the word yaña (new) and the oecnonym Ätnä.
