= İske Kişet =

İske Kişet Иске Кишет
- selo
- Location within Tatarstan
- Country: Russia
- Region: Tatarstan
- District: Arça District
- Municipality: Yaña Kişet rural settlement
- Time zone: UTC+3:00

İske Kişet (Tatar: Иске Кишет, romanized: İske Kişet) is a rural locality (a selo) in Arça District, Tatarstan. The population was 418 as of 2010. İske Kişet is located 29 km from Arça, district's administrative centre, and 77 km from Ԛazаn, republic's capital, by road. The village already existed during the period of the Qazan Khanate. There are 3 streets in the village.
