= Yuğarı Atı =

Yuğarı Atı Югары Аты
- selo
- Location within Tatarstan
- Country: Russia
- Region: Tatarstan
- District: Arça District
- Municipality: Utar-Atı rural settlement
- Time zone: UTC+3:00

Yuğarı Atı (Tatar: Югары Аты, romanized: Yuğarı Atı) is a rural locality (a selo) in Arça District, Tatarstan. The population was 232 as of 2010. Yuğarı Atı is located 13 km from Arça, district's administrative centre, and 73 km from Ԛazаn, republic's capital, by road. The village already existed during the period of the Qazan Khanate. There are 3 streets in the village.
