= Yuğarı Buca =

Yuğarı Buca Югары Буҗа
- derevnya
- Location within Tatarstan
- Country: Russia
- Region: Tatarstan
- District: Arça District
- Municipality: Arça urban settlement
- Time zone: UTC+3:00

Yuğarı Buca (Tatar: Югары Буҗа, romanized: Yuğarı Buca) is a rural locality (a derevnya) in Arça District, Tatarstan. The population was 392 as of 2010. Yuğarı Buca is located 4 km from Arça, district's administrative centre, and 61 km from Ԛazan, republic's capital, by road. The village already existed during the period of the Qazan Khanate. There are 8 streets in the village.
