= Norlat, Zelenodolsky District, Republic of Tatarstan =

Norlat Норлат
- Selo
- Location within Tatarstan
- Country: Russia
- Region: Tatarstan
- District: Zelenodolsky District
- Time zone: UTC+3:00

Norlat (Tatar: Норлат, Russian: Нурлаты) is a rural locality (a selo) in Zelenodolsky District, Tatarstan. The population was 2693 as of 2010.

== Geography ==
Norlat is located 33 km southwest of Yäşel Üzän, district's administrative centre, and 85 km southwest of Qazan, republic's capital, by road.

== History ==
The village already existed during the period of the Khanate of Qazan.

From 17th to first half of the 19th centuries village's residents belonged to the social estate of state peasants.

By the beginning of the twentieth century, village had 4 mosques, 2, 3 windmills, 3 forges, and 12 small shops.

Before the creation of Tatar ASSR in 1920 was a part of Zöyä Uyezd of Qazan Governorate. Since 1920 was a part of Zöyä Canton; after creation of districts in Tatar ASSR (Tatarstan) in Norlat-Açasır (later Norlat) (1927–1963) and Yäşel Üzän districts.

== Notable people ==
Norlat is a birthplace of İldus Xäybullin, a physicist and Wil Ğänief, a poet.
