= Märcani =

Märcani or Mardzhani may refer to:

- Märcani Mosque, a mosque in Kazan, Russia, built in 1766–1770
- Şihabetdin Märcani (1818–1889), Tatar Muslim theologian and historian
