= Yuğarı Mätäskä =

Yuğarı Mätäskä Югары Мәтәскә
- derevnya
- Location within Tatarstan
- Country: Russia
- Region: Tatarstan
- District: Arça District
- Municipality: İske Qırlay rural settlement
- Time zone: UTC+3:00

Yuğarı Mätäskä (Tatar: Югары Мәтәскә, romanized: Yuğarı Mätäskä) is a rural locality (a derevnya) in Arça District, Tatarstan. The population was 280 as of 2010. Yuğarı Mätäskä is located 6 km from Arça, district's administrative centre, and 74 km from Ԛazаn, republic's capital, by road. The village already existed during the period of the Qazan Khanate. There are 4 streets in the village.
