= Zur Biräzä =

Zur Biräzä Зур Бирәзә
- selo
- Location within Tatarstan
- Country: Russia
- Region: Tatarstan
- District: Arça District
- Municipality: Arça urban settlement
- Time zone: UTC+3:00

Zur Biräzä (Tatar: Зур Бирәзә, romanized: Zur Biräzä) is a rural locality (a selo) in Arça District, Tatarstan. The population was 379 as of 2010. Zur Biräzä is located 2 km from Arça, district's administrative centre, and 66 km from Ԛazan, republic's capital, by road. The village already existed during the period of the Qazan Khanate. There are 6 streets in the village.
