= Tübän Mätäskä =

Tübän Mätäskä Түбән Мәтәскә
- selo
- Location within Tatarstan
- Country: Russia
- Region: Tatarstan
- District: Arça District
- Municipality: İske Qırlay rural settlement
- Time zone: UTC+3:00

Tübän Mätäskä (Tatar: Түбән Мәтәскә, romanized: Tübän Mätäskä) is a rural locality (a selo) in Arça District, Tatarstan. The population was 454 as of 2010. Tübän Mätäskä is located 6 km from Аrça, district's administrative centre, and 73 km from Ԛazаn, republic's capital, by road. The village already existed during the period of the Qazan Khanate. There are 4 streets in the village.
