= Taxable estate =

Taxable estate may refer to:

- the estate taxable under estate taxes
- taxable real-estate under property taxes
- a type of estate in the Social estates in the Russian Empire
