= Tübän Orı =

Tübän Orı Түбән Оры
- selo
- Location within Tatarstan
- Country: Russia
- Region: Tatarstan
- District: Arça District
- Municipality: Yaña Kenär rural settlement

Population (2010)
  - Total: 297
- Time zone: UTC+3:00

Tübän Orı (Tatar: Түбән Оры, romanized: Tübän Orı) is a rural locality (a selo) in Arça District, Tatarstan. The population was 291 as of 2010. Tübän Orı is located 46 km from Arça, district's administrative centre, and 95 km from Ԛazаn, republic's capital, by road. The village already existed during the period of the Qazan Khanate. There are 6 streets in the village.
