= Göberçäk =

Göberçäk Гөберчәк
- selo
- Location within Tatarstan
- Country: Russia
- Region: Tatarstan
- District: Arça District
- Municipality: Sece rural settlement
- Time zone: UTC+3:00

Göberçäk (Tatar: Гөберчәк, romanized: Göberçäk) is a rural locality (a selo) in Arça District, Tatarstan. The population was 299 as of 2010. Göberçäk is located 20 km from Arça, district's administrative centre, and 91 km from Ԛazаn, republic's capital, by road. The village already existed during the period of the Qazan Khanate. There are 2 streets in the village.
