= Nurlatsky District =

Nurlatsky District may refer to:

- Nurlatsky District, Republic of Tatarstan, a district of the Republic of Tatarstan, Russia
- Nurlatsky District, Tatar ASSR (1927–1963), a district of the Tatar ASSR, Russian SFSR, Soviet Union
