= Nurlaty =

Nurlaty may refer to:

- Nurlaty, Buinsky District, Republic of Tatarstan, a village (selo) in Buinsky District of the Republic of Tatarstan, Russia
- Nurlaty, Zelenodolsky District, Republic of Tatarstan, a village (selo) in Zelenodolsky District of the Republic of Tatarstan, Russia
