= İske Çürile =

İske Çürile Иске Чүриле
- selo
- Location within Tatarstan
- Country: Russia
- Region: Tatarstan
- District: Arça District
- Municipality: İske Çürlie rural settlement

Population (2010)
  - Total: 710
- Time zone: UTC+3:00

İske Çürile (Tatar: Иске Чүриле, romanized: İske Çürile) is a rural locality (a selo) in Arça District, Tatarstan. The population was 709 as of 2010. İske Çürile is located 12 km from Аrça, district's administrative centre, and 53 km from Ԛazаn, republic's capital, by road. The village already existed during the period of the Qazan Khanate. There are 4 streets in the village.
