= Marjani =

Marjani may refer to:

- Marjani akritidu in Jesenik, Czechia
- Shihabetdin Marjani - 19th century Tatar theologian and historian
- A song in the movie Billu
