= Küperbaş =

Küperbaş Күпербаш
- selo
- Location within Tatarstan
- Country: Russia
- Region: Tatarstan
- District: Arça District
- Municipality: Arça urban settlement
- Time zone: UTC+3:00

Küperbaş (Tatar: Күпербаш, romanized: Küperbaş) is a rural locality (a selo) in Arça District, Tatarstan. The population was 448 as of 2010. Küperbaş is located 4 km from Arça, district's administrative centre, and 72 km from Ԛazаn, republic's capital, by road. The village already existed during the period of the Qazan Khanate. There are 9 streets in the village.
