= Şihabetdin Märcani =

Tatar Hanafi theologist and historian (1818–1889)

- شهاب الدین مرجانی; Shihāb al-Dīn Marjānī
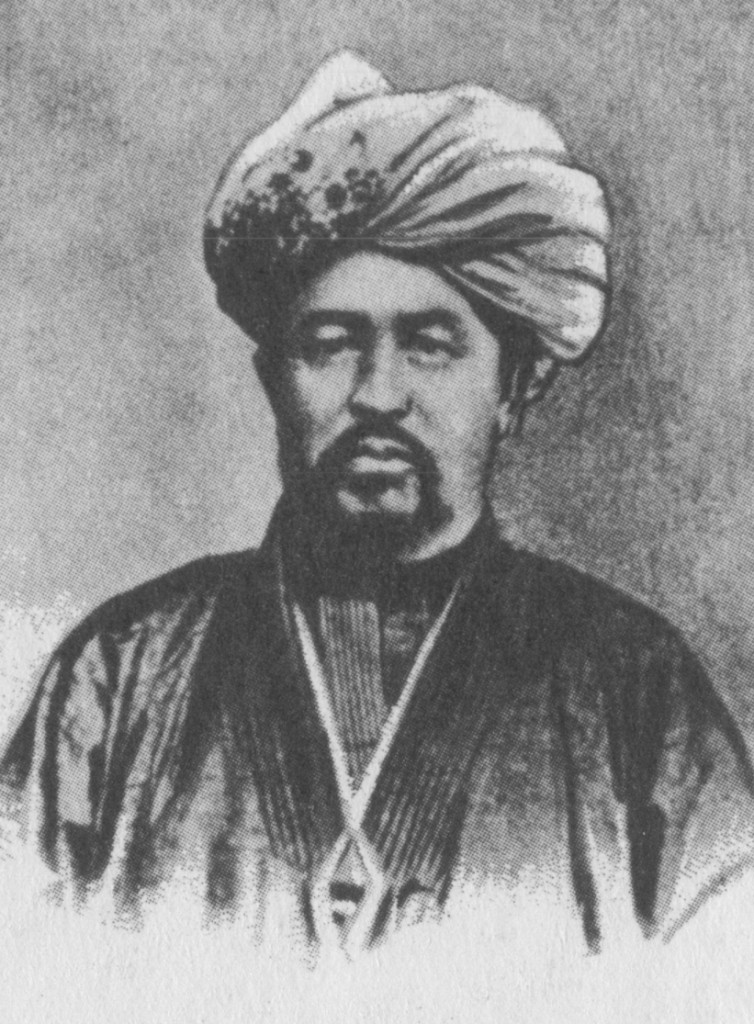

Personal life
- Born: 3 January 1818 CE (7 Rabi' al-Awwal 1233 AH) Yapançı, Tatarstan, Russian Empire
- Died: 1889 (aged 70–71) (1306) Kazan, Tatarstan, Russian Empire

Religious life
- Religion: Islam
- Denomination: Sunni
- Jurisprudence: Hanafi
- Creed: Maturidi

Şihabetdin Märcani (Tatar: شهاب الدین مرجانی, Cyrillic: Шиһабетдин Мәрҗани, IPA: [ʃihabetˈtin mærʑaˈni]; (Note: Also spelled Shihab al-Din al-Marjani; commonly transliterated Shigabuddin Mardzhani or Mardjani via Russian (Russian: Шигабуддин Марджани) and Shihab ad-Din Marjani via Perso-Arabic (Tatar: شهاب الدین مرجانی)) 1818–1889) was a Tatar Hanafi-Maturidi theologian and historian. Märcani has been noted for "laying the basis for the theory of a Tatar territorial nation by establishing historical continuity between Volga Bulgaria, the Golden Horde, the Khanate of Kazan and the Tatars of his time". Märcani advocated for the use of the ethnonym "Tatar", in spite of the negative connotation it had during the Russian Empire. Märcani was part of the Naqshbandi Sufi order.

Märcani studied in madrassas of Tashkichu (near Kazan), Bukhara and Samarkand. Beginning in 1850 he served as the imam of the First Cathedral Mosque. Later, in 1867, he became a muhtasib of Kazan. At the same time, in 1876-1884 he lectured on religion in the Tatar Teachers' School. Märcani became the first Muslim member of The Society for Archaeology, History and Ethnography at Kazan State University. In his papers he illustrated his ideas about the renovation and the perfection of the Tatar educational system. As a historian, he was the first Tatar scholar to employ a synthesis of European methodology with the traditions of the Oriental scholars. He was the author of more than 30 volumes about Tatar history.

== Name ==
Full name in Arabic naming system: Shihab al-Dīn ibn Bahāʼ al-Dīn ibn Subḥān ibn ʻAbd al-Karīm ibn ʻAbd al-Tawwāb ibn ʻAbd al-Ghanī ibn ʻAbd al-Quddūs ibn Yedish ibn Yediger ibn ʻUmar.

Modern Tatar: Шиһабетдин Баһаветдин улы Мәрҗани (Şihabetdin Bahawetdin ulı Mərcani). Sometimes spelled Marjani. In Russian Shigabutdin Mardzhani (Шигабутдин Марджани), or Shikhabetdin (Шихабетдин). In Turkish sources Şehabeddin Mercani.

Also known as Shihabaddin Mardjani, Shihabuddin Marjani, Shihab al-Din al-Marjani.

== Works ==
Märcani wrote several works in various Islamic disciplines in Arabic, Turkish, and Persian, including the following:

1. al-Ḥikmah al-Bālighah al-Janiyyah fī Sharḥ al-‘Aqā’id al-Ḥanafiyyah (Arabic: الحكمة البالغة الجنية في شرح العقائد الحنفية), a commentary on Abu Hafs 'Umar al-Nasafi's al-'Aqa'id al-Nasafiyyah written in refutation of the more popular commentary written by Sa'd al-Din al-Taftazani.
2. al-‘Adhb al-Furāt wa-al-Mā’ al-Zulāl al-Nāfi‘ li-Ghullat Ruwwām al-Ibrāz al-Asrār Sharḥ al-Jalāl (Arabic: العذب الفرات والماء الزلال النافع لغلة روّام الإبراز الأسرار شرح الجلال), a marginalia on Jalal al-Din al-Dawwani's commentary on 'Adud al-Din al-Iji's 'Aqā'id.
3. Ghurfat al-Ḥawāqīn li-Ma‘rifat al-Khawāqīn (Arabic: غرفة الحواقين لمعرفة الخواقين)
4. Ghilālat al-Zamān fī Tārīkh Bulghār wa-Qazān (Arabic: غلالة الزمان في تاريخ بلغار وقزان)
5. Wafiyyat al-Aslāf wa-Naḥiyyat al-Akhlāf (Arabic: وفيّة الأسلاف ونحيّة الأخلاف), a seven-volume biographical dictionary of Islamic history. The first volume is titled al-Muqaddimah, a reference to the inspiration the author drew from Ibn Khaldun's Muqaddimah.
6. Muntakhab al-Wafiyyah (Arabic: منتخب الوفية), a collection of excerpts from the aforementioned Wafiyyat al-Aslaf.
7. Tanbīh Abnā’ al-‘Aṣr ‘alá Tanzīh Abnā’ Abī al-Naṣr (Arabic: تنبيه أبناء العصر على تنزيه أبناء أبي النصر), a treatise on the differences of opinion between the "Qadimist" scholars of Bukhara and the Jadidist Ghabdennasir Qursawi.
8. Ḥaqq al-Ma‘rifah wa-Ḥusn al-Idrāk bi-Mā Yalzamu fī Wujūb al-Fiṭr wa-al-Imsāk (Arabic: حق المعرفة وحسن الإدراك بما يلزم في وجوب الفطر والإمساك)
9. Nāẓūrat al-Ḥaqq fī Farḍiyyat al-‘Ishā’ wa-In Lam Yaghib al-Shafaq (Arabic: ناظورة الحق في فرضيّة العشاء وإن لم يغب الشفق), a legal work verifying the Hanafi position on performing the Isha prayer at higher latitudes where the sun does not set.
10. al-Fawā’id al-Muhimmah (Arabic: الفوائد المهمة)
11. al-Barq al-Wamīḍ fī al-Radd ‘alá al-Baghīḍ al-Musammá bi-al-Naqīḍ (Arabic: البرق الوميض في الرد على البغيض المسمى بالنقيض)
12. Kashf al-Ghiṭā’ ‘an al-Abṣār bi-Aghlāṭ Tawārīkh Bulghār wa-Akādhībiha al-Ṣarīḥah li-Dhawī al-I‘tibār (Arabic: كشف الغطاء عن الأبصار بأغلاط تواريخ بلغار وأكاذيبها الصريحة لذوي الاعتبار)
13. Mustafād al-Akhbār fī Aḥwāl Qazān wa-Bulghār (Arabic: مستفاد الأخبار في أحوال قزان وبلغار)
14. al-Ṭarīqah al-Muthlá wa-al-‘Aqīdah al-Ḥusná (Arabic: الطريقة المثلى والعقيدة الحسنى)
15. al-Naṣā’iḥ (Arabic: النصائح), a work on Islamic animal ethics.
16. Khizāmat al-Ḥawāshī li-Izālat al-Ghawāshī (Arabic: خزامة الحواشي لإزالة الغواشي), a marginalia on Sadr al-Shari'a al-Asghar's autocommentary al-Tawdih on the al-Tanqih which proposes a synthesis between the two dominant persuasions of Sunni legal epistemology.
17. al-Mathal al-A‘lá (Arabic: المثل الأعلى)
18. Sharḥ Muqaddimat al-Risālah al-Shamsiyyah fī-al-Manṭiq (Arabic: شرح مقدمة الرسالة الشمسية في المنطق), a commentary on the Najm al-Din al-Katibi's introduction to his al-Risālah al-Shamsiyyah which concerns the quiddity and subject matter of Arabic logic.
19. Taḥārīr Mufradah (Arabic: تحارير مفردة)
20. Jawāmi‘ al-Ḥikam Dharā’i‘ al-Ni‘am min Maqālāt ‘Alī ibn Abī Ṭālib (Arabic: جوامع الحكم ذرائع النعم من مقالات علي بن أبي طالب)
21. Tadhkirat al-Munīb bi-‘Adam Tazkiyat Ahl al-Ṣalīb (Arabic: تذكرة المنيب بعدم تزكية أهل الصليب), a work on Islamic dietary jurisprudence, specifically the impermissibility of eating meat slaughtered by Christians.
22. Mukhtaṣar al-Nujūm al-Zāhirah fī Aḥwāl Miṣr wa-al-Qāhirah (Arabic: مختصر النجوم الزاهرة في أحوال مصر والقاهرة), an abridgement of Ibn Taghribirdi's chronicle of Egyptian history.
23. Ḥaqq al-Bayān wa-al-Taṣwīr fī Mas’alat Ḥudūth ‘Ālam al-Amr wa-al-Taqdīr (Arabic: حق البيان والتصوير في مسألة حدوث عالم الأمر والتقدير), a treatise on the Islamic creedal doctrine of creatio ex nihilo.
24. al-Ḥaqq al-Mubīn fī Maḥāsin Awḍā‘ Al-Dīn (Arabic: الحق المبين في محاسن أوضاع الدين), a work on the role of Qur'anic miracles in confirming the prophethood of Muhammad.
25. I‘lām Abnā’ al-Dahr bi-Aḥwāl Ahl Mā Warā’ al-Nahr (Arabic: إعلام أبناء الدهر بأحوال أهل ما وراء النهر)
26. Risālah fī Masā’il al-Naḥw (Arabic: رسالة في مسائل النحو)
27. Risālah Turkiyyah fī Manāsik al-Ḥajj (Arabic: رسالة تركية في مناسك الحج)
28. Risālah Turkiyyah (Arabic: رسالة تركية)
29. Mashāri‘ al-Uṣūl wa-Mashārib al-Fuṣūl (Arabic: مشارع الأصول ومشارب الفصول)
30. al-Riḥlah (Arabic: الرحلة)

== See also ==
- List of Hanafis
- List of Ash'aris and Maturidis
- List of Muslim theologians
