= Nurlatsky District, Tatar ASSR =

District of Tatar ASSR

Coordinates: 55°37′N 48°18′E

Nurlatsky District or Norlat District (Russian: Нурлатский район; Tatar: Norlat rayonı) was a district (raion) of the Tatar ASSR that existed in the 1920s–1960s.

It was established as Nurlat-Achysarsky District (Russian: Нурлат-Ачасырский район; Tatar: Норлат-Ачасыр районы, romanized: Norlat-Açasır rayonı) on February 14, 1927. Its administrative center was the village (selo) of Nurlaty.

On August 1, 1927 it was renamed Nurlatsky. On February 1, 1963, the district was abolished and its territory merged into Zelenodolsky District.
