= Estate name =

Name designating an estate, house, or farm

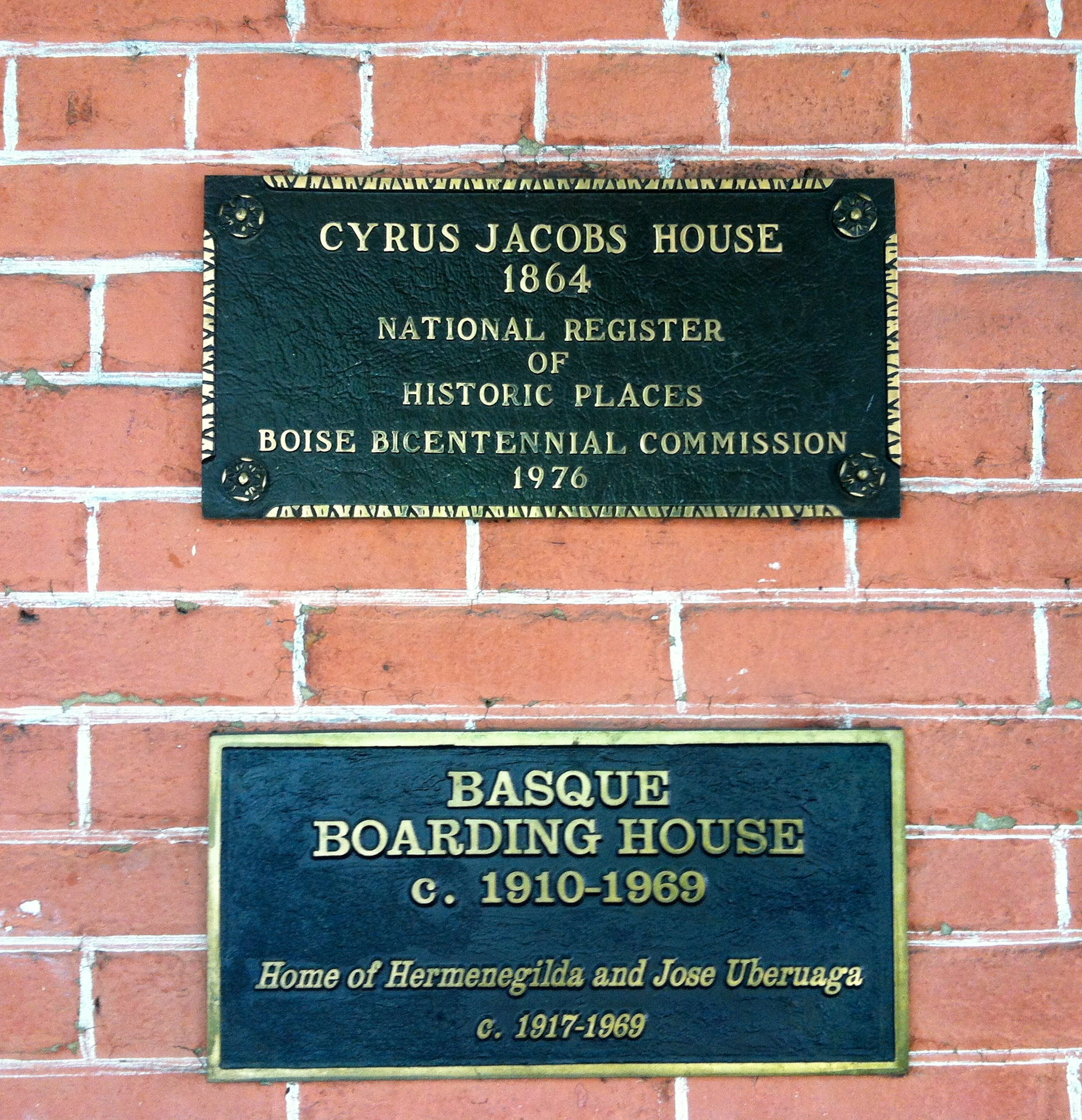
An estate sign designating the Cyrus Jacobs House in Boise, Idaho.

An estate name, also house name or farm name, is a specific type of toponym that designates an estate, house, or farm. Estate names differ from most toponyms in that they designate proper names, which may give little or no geographic information to people who are not already familiar with the settlement so named. When used in a person's name, for example, the name of a family farm may be taken, rather than the word for farm or a nearby river (as would be classically toponymic).

== Other terminology ==
Sometimes, the term ecodomonym (from Ancient Greek: δόμος, domos) is used to refer specifically to a building as an inhabited place. Comparatively, the term mansionym is used to designate a historical residence (e.g., the Daniel Boone Homestead). Lay terms referring to the proper name of a house or other building include house name, farm name, which refers to an agricultural property, or property name, which refers to a non-agricultural property.

Individuals may traditionally be referred to by estate names rather than other surnames in Basque, Finnish, Norwegian, Slovene, and other languages. In these cultures, the name of the property is more or less fixed and may refer to the people living there at any particular time, regardless of their actual surname or whether they recently purchased or moved to the property.

== Examples of estate names ==
=== German ===
German farm names (German: Hofname) were often adopted as surnames. Surnames with such origins are most common in Lower Saxony and North Rhine-Westphalia.

=== Icelandic ===
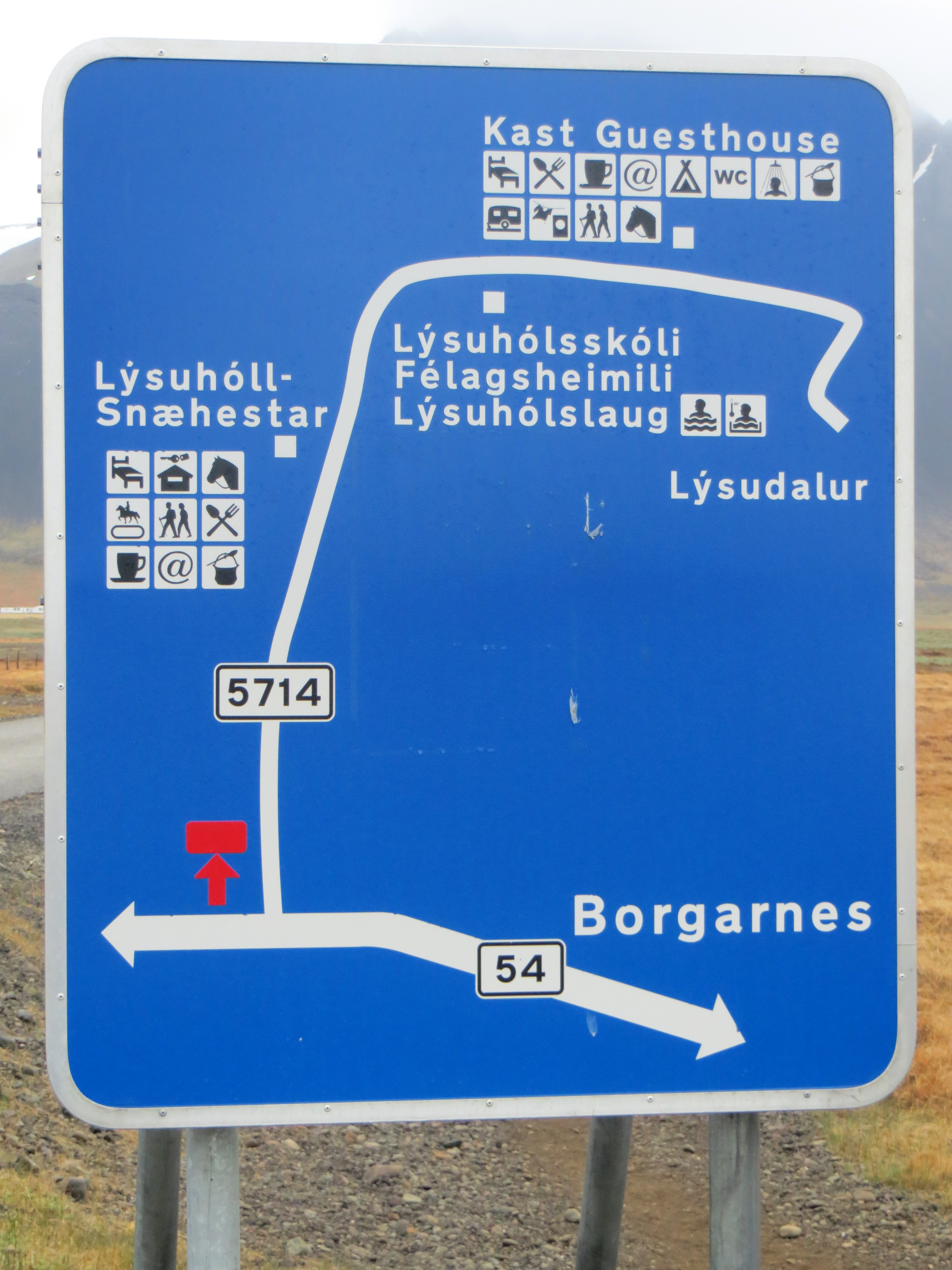
A road sign with farm names (Lýsuhóll, Lýsudalur) in Iceland

Explicit reference is made to farm names (and their lack of correspondence with residents' names) in Njáls saga, a 13th-century Icelandic work describing events between 960 and 1020. For example:

Þar eru þrír bæir er í Mörk heita allir. Á miðbænum bjó sá maður er Björn hét og var kallaður Björn hvíti.
'There are three farms in that district, all called Mörk. At the middle farm lived a man named Björn [Kaðalsson], known as Björn the White.' (chapter 148)

In comparison to farm names in Norwegian and Faroese, in which the share of such names based on persons' names may be as low as 4 to 5%, in Icelandic approximately 32% of farm names are based on a personal name. Since 1953, farm names have been enshrined in law, and Icelandic farms are required to have registered names approved by a special committee. As travel by ship became more common in Iceland, the number of farms that had to be distinguished grew in number, and more complex compound names were created. In compound Icelandic farm names, the single most common second element is -staðir 'place', although topographical suffixes (-dalr 'valley', -nes 'headland', -fell 'hill', -eyrr 'bank') form the largest group of such elements.

=== Norwegian ===
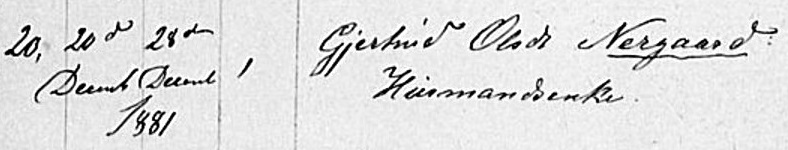
A Norwegian first name (Gjertrud) followed by a patronym (Olsdatter) and farm name (Nergaard)

Norwegian farm names (Norwegian: gårdsnavn) are based on various factors associated with a property: local geography (hills, etc.), land use, vegetation, animals, characteristic activity, folk religion, and owners' nicknames. Such names in Norway were collected in the 19-volume collection Norske Gaardnavne, published between 1897 and 1924. Typical suffixes on such names include -bø, -gaard/-gård, -heim/-um, -land, -rud/-rød, and -set. After the 1923 naming law (Norwegian: Lov om personnavn or Navneloven) was passed in Norway, many rural people adopted the names of the farms where they lived as surnames. These farm names were retained as surnames even after they moved away to towns or emigrated. It is estimated that 70% of surnames in Norway are based on farm names.

The traditional farm name system was not retained among Norwegian emigrants to the United States, even in communities where Norwegian continued to be spoken. It has been suggested that this was because of cultural differences, whereby American farms were perceived as income sources rather than traditional family seats.

=== Slovene ===
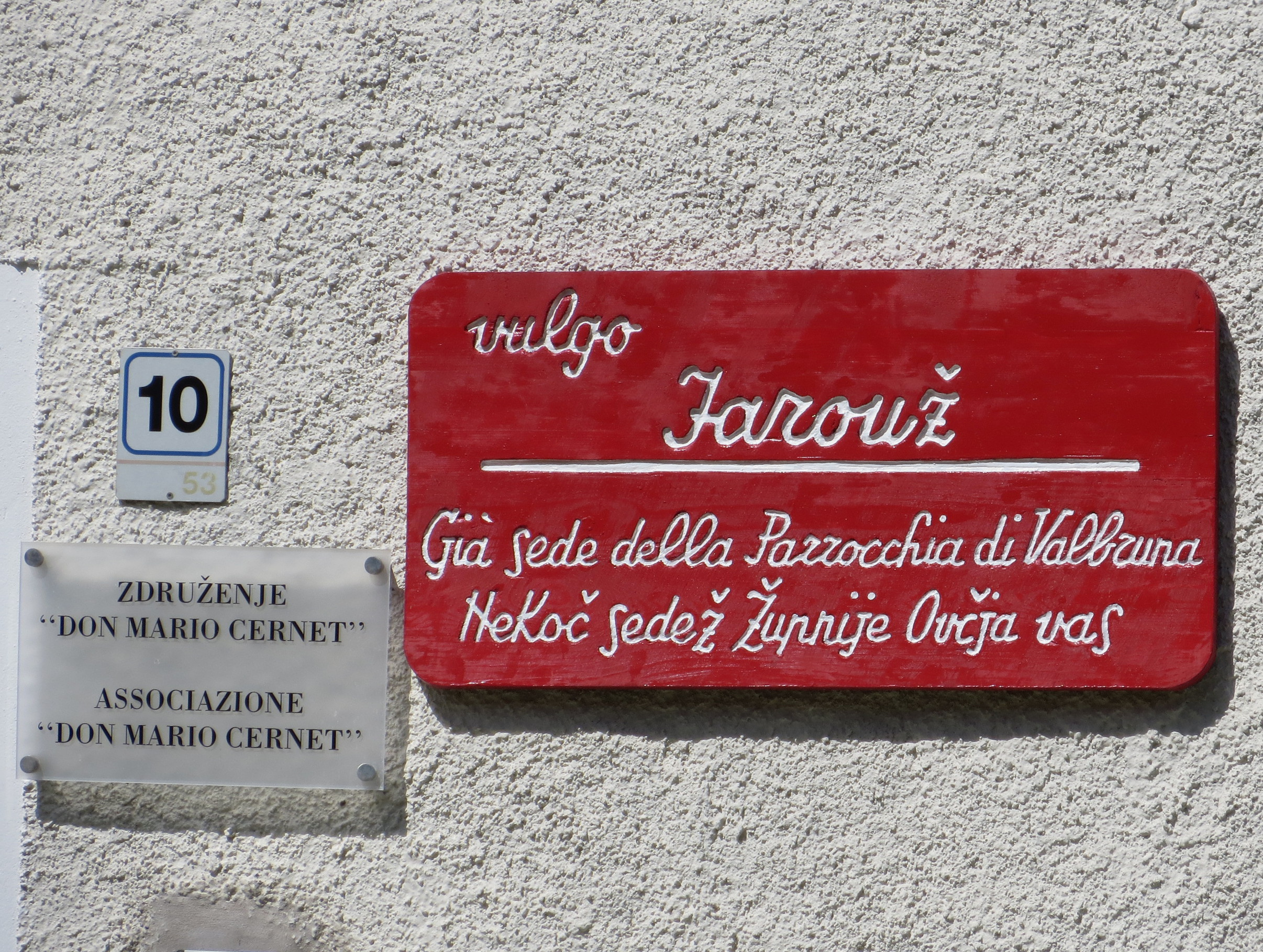
Farouž, a house name in Valbruna (Slovene: Ovčja vas), Italy

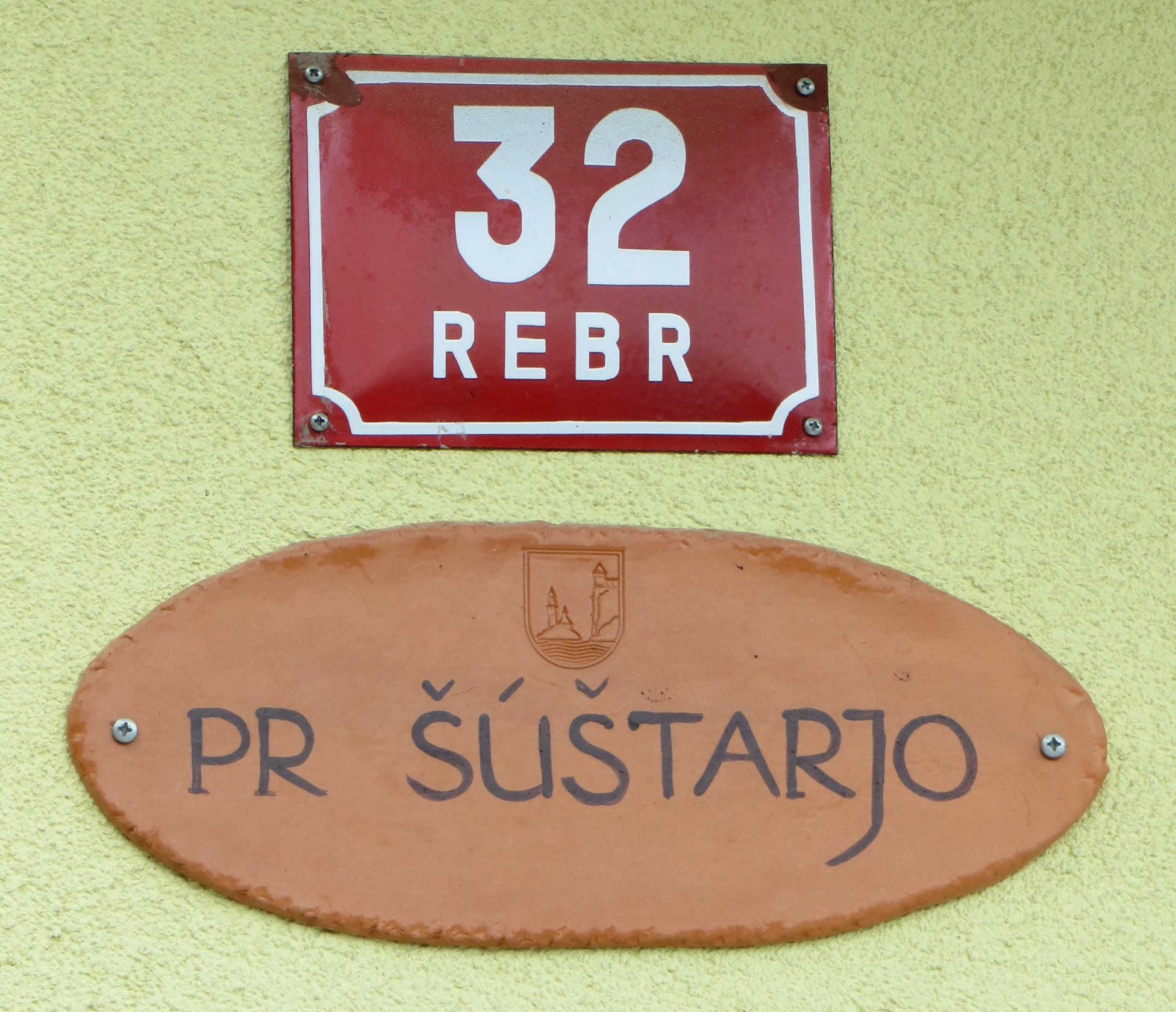
A street address and house name (in dialect) in Zasip, Slovenia

Slovene house names

Slovene house names (Slovene: hišno ime, lit. 'house name') are generally based on microtoponyms (e.g., pri Vrtaču 'sinkhole'); on names of animals (pri Ovnu 'ram'), trees (pri Gabru 'hornbeam'), and other plants (pri Čemažarju 'ramsons') associated with a property; on activities traditionally associated with a property (pri Sadjarju 'planting'); or on the name or nickname of the original property owner (pri Ančki 'Annie'). They may also refer to roles (formerly) played in the community (e.g., pri Španu 'mayor'), the property's physical position (pri Zgornjih 'upper') or age (Stara šola 'old school'), professions (pri Žnidarju 'tailor'), personal qualities (pri Bogatu 'rich'), or other noteworthy characteristics (e.g., pri Amerikanu 'immigrant returned from the United States'). The properties are generally referred to with a locative phrase (e.g., pri Gabru 'at the Gaber farm'), and the residents are referred to with the base noun (e.g., Gaber 'the man from the Gaber farm'), a derived noun (Gabrovka 'the woman from the Gaber farm'), or a preceding denominal adjective (Gabrov Jože 'Jože from the Gaber farm', Gabrova Marija 'Marija from the Gaber farm'). A well-known Slovene example is the writer Lovro Kuhar, better known by the pen name Prežihov Voranc (literally, 'Voranc from the Prežih farm'). Slovene house names often appear on gravestones as plural denominal adjectives (e.g., Gabrovi 'the ones from the Gaber farm'), sometimes without the surname being given at all.

== Sources ==
- Room, Adrian (1996). An Alphabetical Guide to the Language of Name Studies. Lanham and London: The Scarecrow Press. ISBN 9780810831698.
- Zgusta, Ladislav (1998). "The Terminology of Name Studies (In Margine of Adrian Room's Guide to the Language. of Name Studies)". Names: A Journal of Onomastics. 46 (27–7738): 189–203. doi:10.1179/nam.1998.46.3.189.
