= Tsaryovokokshaysky Uyezd =

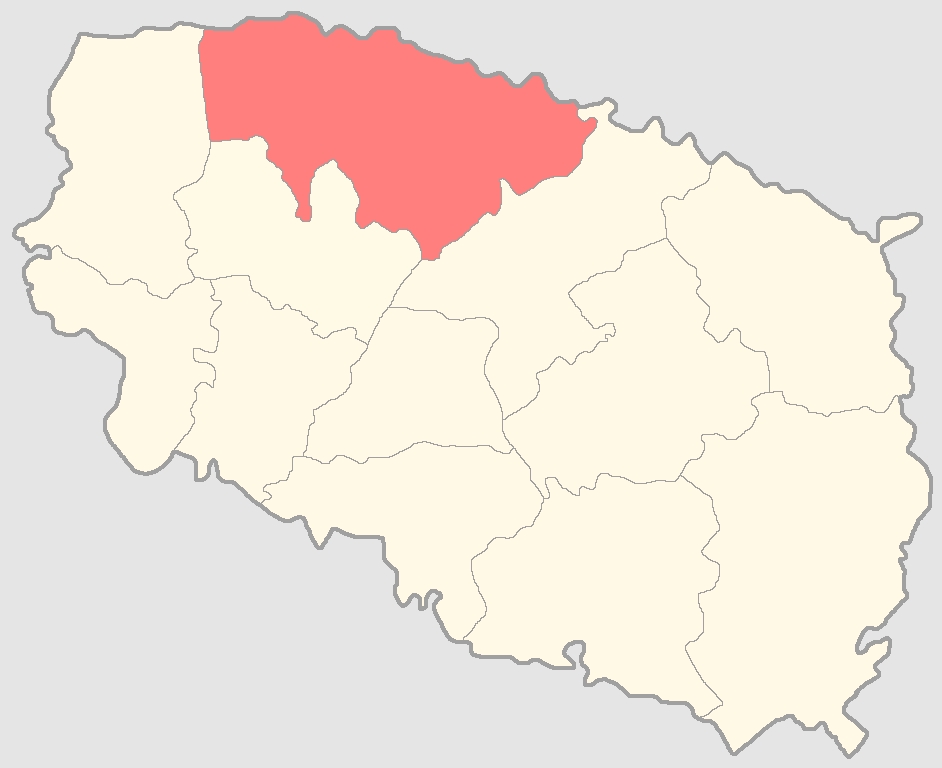
Tsarevokokshaysky district on the map of Kazan province

Tsaryovokokshaysky Uyezd (Царевококшайский уезд) was one of the subdivisions of the Kazan Governorate of the Russian Empire. It was situated in the northwestern part of the governorate. Its administrative centre was Tsaryovokokshaysk (Yoshkar-Ola).

== Demographics ==
At the time of the Russian Empire Census of 1897, Tsaryovokokshaysky Uyezd had a population of 112,631. Of these, 54.7% spoke Mari, 24.0% Russian, 21.1% Tatar and 0.1% Chuvash as their native language.
