= Tukayevsky District, Tatar ASSR =

District of Tatar ASSR

Tukayevsky District or Tuqay District (Russian: Тукаевский район; Tatar: Тукай районы) was a district (raion) of the Tatar ASSR.

It was established as Kzyl-Yulsky District on February 10, 1930. Its administrative center was the village (selo) of Yaña Kenär. It was renamed on July 18, 1956. On October 12, 1959, the territory of abolished Atninsky District were transferred to the Tukaevsky district and its administrative center was moved to Bolshaya Atnya.

On February 1, 1963, the district was abolished and its territory was transferred to Arsky District.
