= Arsk Canton =

Arsk Canton (known as Kazan Canton at the time of its foundation) was an administrative division (a сanton) of the Tatar ASSR in 1920–;1930. Its area was 7,500 km^{2}; population: 375,000. In 1926, 59.2% of the population were Tatars, 37.5%—Russians, and 2.7%—Udmurts. The administrative center of the canton was the town of Arsk. In 1929, the canton consisted of fifteen volosts. There were 404 schools in the canton as early as in 1927.

== Economics ==
A woodworking, metal-working, food and glass industry, Paratsky shipyard, as well as homecraft were developed in the canton. Rye, barley, oats, wheat and potatoes were cultivated, cattle and horses were bred.

== Division ==
In 1930, during the raionization of the Tatar ASSR, the canton was divided into Arsky, Dubyazsky, Pestrichinsky, Kzyl-Yulsky, and Tyuntyarsky Districts.
