= Atninsky District =

Atninsky District Атнинский район (Russian)
- District

Other transcription(s)
  - Tatar: Әтнә районы
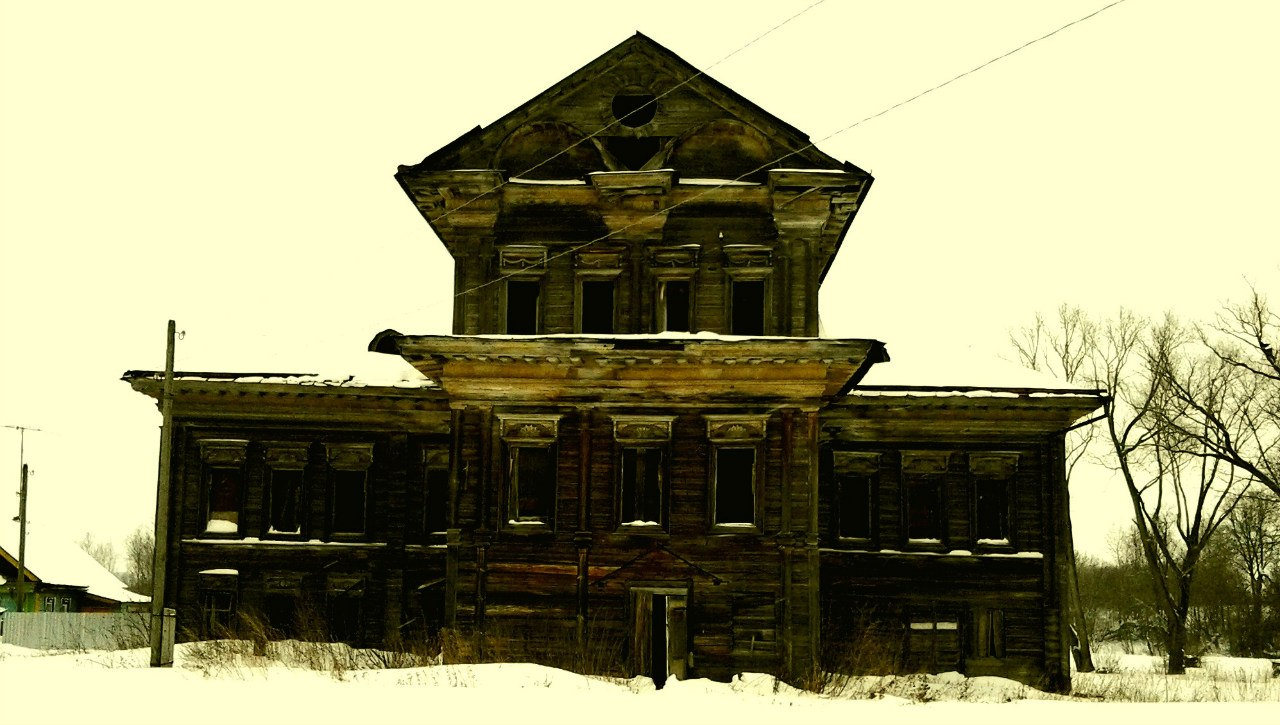
- House in village (selo) Ola Menger, Atninsky District

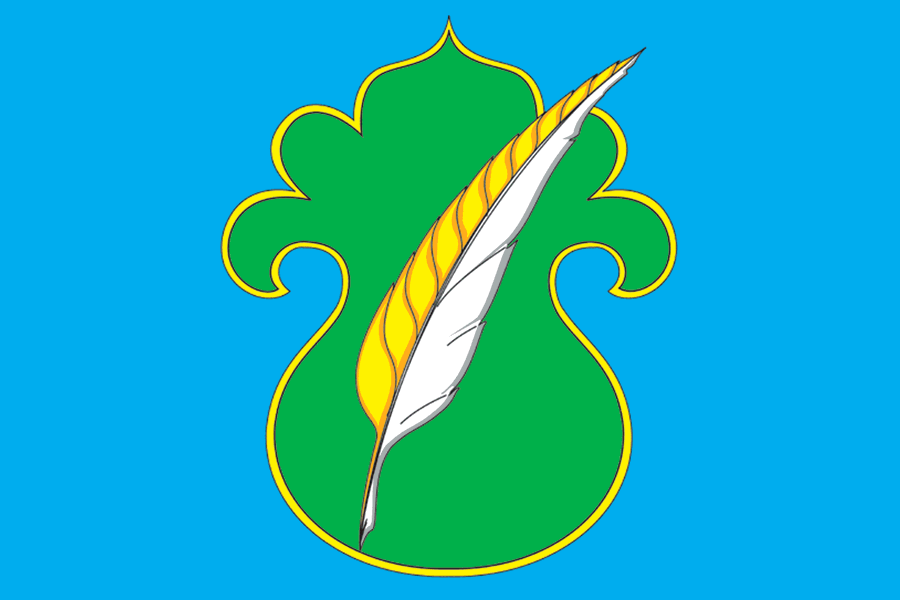
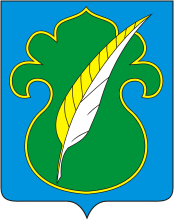
- Flag Coat of arms
- Location of Atninsky District in the Republic of Tatarstan
- Coordinates: 56°16′N 49°27′E
- Country: Russia
- Federal subject: Republic of Tatarstan
- Established: 10 August 1930
- Administrative center: Bolshaya Atnya

Area
  - Total: 681.4 km^{2} (263.1 sq mi)

Population (2010 Census)
  - Total: 13,650
  - Density: 20.03/km^{2} (51.88/sq mi)
  - Urban: 0%
  - Rural: 100%

Administrative structure
  - Inhabited localities: 47 rural localities

Municipal structure
  - Municipally incorporated as: Atninsky Municipal District
  - Municipal divisions: 0 urban settlements, 12 rural settlements
- Time zone: UTC+3 (MSK)
- OKTMO ID: 92613000
- Website: http://atnya.tatarstan.ru

Atninsky District (Russian: Атни́нский райо́н; Tatar: Әтнә районы) is a territorial administrative unit and municipal district of the Republic of Tatarstan within the Russian Federation. The district is located in the northwest of the republic. The territory of the district includes 47 settlements, which are united into 12 rural settlements. As of 2020, 12 883 people reside in the district. The administrative center is the village of Bolshaya Atnya, founded during the period of the Khanate of Kazan.

== Geography ==
The total area of the district is 681.4 km^{2}. It borders the Arsky and Vysokogorsky Districts of Tatarstan and the Republic of Mari El (Morkinsky District). The relief is a hilly plain with prevailing heights of 160–180 meters. Forests cover 3.9% of the district area. The largest river is Ashit while the largest tributaries are Urtemka (16 km), Shashi (15 km), and Ura (13 km).

Protected natural areas include the natural zakaznik "Ashit", which occupies 2.7 thousand hectares - 4% of the total area of the region. Elks, wild boars, foxes, badgers, white hares and brown hares, American minks, ferrets and muskrats, as well as more than 200 bird species can be found here.

== Coat of arms and flag ==
The coat of arms and the flag were approved by the decision of the Atninsky District Council of March 3, 2006. The development was carried out by the Heraldic Council under the President of the Republic of Tatarstan together with the Russian Union of Heraldists. The Atninsky district is one of the centers of Tatar culture, which to a greater extent has preserved folk traditions and rituals. The tulip, as one of the main national ornaments of Tatarstan, reflects the residents' loyalty to the traditions of their people, and the desire to preserve and support the local culture. The feather is a symbol of ancient history, culture, and rich spirituality. Many outstanding poets and educators were born and raised in the Atninsky region. Among them are the scientist and a spiritual leader Şihabetdin Märcani, Tatar poet Ğabdulla Tuqay, and others. The agrarian orientation of the region is conveyed by half of a gold-colored feather, decorated in the form of an ear. Blue indicates honor, nobility and spirituality; green stands for a rich nature, health and growth in life; silver symbolizes perfection, peace and understanding, while gold is a symbol of stability, respect and intelligence. The flag of the Atninsky region was developed on the basis of the coat of arms. It is a rectangular blue canvas, in the center of which there is a green tulip and a white and gold feather.

== History ==
Many villages in the region have been known since the times of the Volga Bulgaria, the Golden Horde and the Kazan Khanate. One of the most significant archeological monuments the Aishiyaz settlement of Kala-tau (City on the Mountain) is located on the territory of the district. The fortress city existed during the times of the Bulgar state and was a large trade center. The epitaph monuments of the 14th, 16th-18th centuries in the Muslim Tatar cemeteries also evidence ancient history of the region. On some of the gravestones, the texts are made with an Arab-Tatar relief inscription from the period of the first half of the 16th century.

Until 1920, the territory of the region was part of the Kazan and Tsarevokokshaisky uezds, and from 1920 to 1930 it was a part of the Arsk Canton of the TASSR. The district was formed on August 10, 1930, as Tukaevsky. On March 25, 1938, it was renamed as Atninsky. On October 12, 1959, it was abolished and its territories were transferred to the Tukaevsky district (formerly Kzyl-Yul district), and restored on October 25, 1990. Since October 2005, the head of the Atninsky municipal district is Khakimov Gabdulahat Gilumkhanovich

== Population ==
The region is the most mono-ethnic in Tatarstan with Tatars making up 98.6% of the population.

== Municipal-territorial structure ==
In 2014, a new settlement was formed in the district, which was included in the Bolsheatninskoe rural settlement - the village of Novaya Atnya. Since 2014, there are 47 settlements in the Atninsky district, comprising 12 rural settlements.

== Economy ==
=== Modernity ===
Agriculture is the basis of the regional economy. 53.6 thousand hectares of land have been allocated for agriculture, of which 46.9 thousand hectares are arable land. Wheat, rye, oats, buckwheat, barley, millet, sunflower, potatoes, peas and rapeseed are cultivated in the region. Meat and dairy cattle breeding and sheep breeding are developed, and in terms of the dynamics of dairy production, the Atninsky district has been holding a leading position for several years. So, in 2016, in the district per day one cow produced 21.3 kg. In 2018, milk yield increased to 23.5 kg per cow, which yielded more than 190 tons of milk per day. Milk yield increased to 265 tons per day in 2020.

There are 10 agricultural enterprises in the region, of which the largest are the Tukayevsky company and the agricultural production cooperatives Lenin Breeding Plant, Tan and Shakhtar. In 2012, the Lenin Breeding Plant was awarded by Danone-Unimilk for the most stable quality of milk produced and received the title of “Best Dairy Farm of the Year”. Tukayevsky received recognition for Reliable Partnership, and Tashchishma as the Most Dynamic Supplier. In 2016, 10 peasant (farmer) households were registered in the district. At the end of 2017, the average salary in the agricultural sector of the Republic of Tatarstan amounted to 18.9 thousand rubles, employees of the regional company "Shakhtar" received 23.7 thousand rubles.

As of 2020, agriculture involves such enterprises as the Lenin Breeding Plant, Dushin and Tan livestock and grain-growing crops, Tukalsky, Kushar, Shakhtar, Tashchishma livestock and crop plants, the agricultural firm "Unysh", "Atninskaya bakery" and others. The production, purchase, processing and sale of agricultural products on the territory of the district is handled by the Menger agricultural production complex. Agricultural machinery and equipment are repaired and maintained by Selkhoztekhnika Atninsky District.

In the first half of 2020, the agricultural productivity amounted to almost 1.5 billion rubles, for the whole of 2013 this amount was equal to 1.27 billion. Industrial enterprises are concentrated in the regional center. The largest, Atnyaagrokhim, is engaged in the extraction and sale of limestone, gypsum stone and chalk. From January to September 2020, industrial enterprises shipped goods worth 87 million rubles (in 2013 - almost 76 million).

In the period from 2013 to 2020, the ratio of the average monthly wage to the minimum consumer budget increased from 1.87 to 2.21 times, and the unemployment rate from that year to 2020 slightly decreased - from 0.73% to 0.52%, respectively.

=== Investment potential ===
According to the Federal State Statistics Service of the republic, in 2019 almost 650 million rubles of investments were attracted to the Atninsky district (except for budgetary funds and income from small businesses), a year earlier - 887 million. According to the assessment of the Committee of the Republic of Tatarstan on Socio-Economic Monitoring, investments in fixed assets of the Atninsky district in January–June 2020 amounted to 564,129 thousand rubles, or 0.3% of the total volume of investments in the republic. Based on the assessments of 2020 investments, the leading areas of the district are agriculture, hunting and fishing with almost 404 million rubles in total.

=== Transport ===
The administrative center is located 53 kilometers from Kazan, 30 kilometers southeast of the Kurkachi railway station. Highways Vysokaya Gora - Bolshaya Atnya - Klyuchi-Sap, Bolshaya Atnya - Arsk, Morki - Paranga pass through the territory of the region.

== Social area ==
In the Atninsky district, there are 12 secondary and 9 primary schools, one primary school-kindergarten and 11 kindergartens, as well as three institutions of additional education. There is one institution of secondary vocational education - Atninsky agricultural technical school named after Gabdulla Tukai. Education and upbringing in all institutions is carried out only in the Tatar language.

There are 82 sports facilities in the district, the largest of which is the Ashit cultural and sports complex. The cultural sphere is represented by a cultural and sports center, 13 rural houses of culture, 27 clubs, a central regional library, a children's library, a local history museum and museums of Şihabetdin Märcani and Sibgat Khakim. One of the main socio-cultural attractions of the region is the Atninsky State Drama Theater named after Ğabdulla Tuqay in the village of Bolshaya Atnya. It was founded in 1918. The regional newspaper "Әtnә taңy" ("Atninskaya Zarya") is published in Tatar.

On the territory of the region there is a unique monument of Tatar wooden architecture - the estate of the merchant Valiulla Bakirov in the village of Bolshoi Menger, built in 1838. The building is protected by the state and is an architectural monument of local importance (since 1991), as well as an object of cultural heritage of the peoples of the Russian Federation (2017). The owner of the mansion, Valiulla Bakirov, was a large landowner, millionaire and merchant of the first guild.

== Famous people ==
- Vladislav Achalov — a Soviet general who at one time commanded the Soviet Airborne Forces.
- Asgat Safarov — Russian statesman and politician
- Farid Takhaviev — Hero of Socialist Labour
- Şihabetdin Märcani — a Tatar Hanafi Maturidi Theology and historian
