= Bolshaya Atnya =

Rural locality in Tatarstan, Russia

Coordinates: 56°15′03″N 49°27′02″E

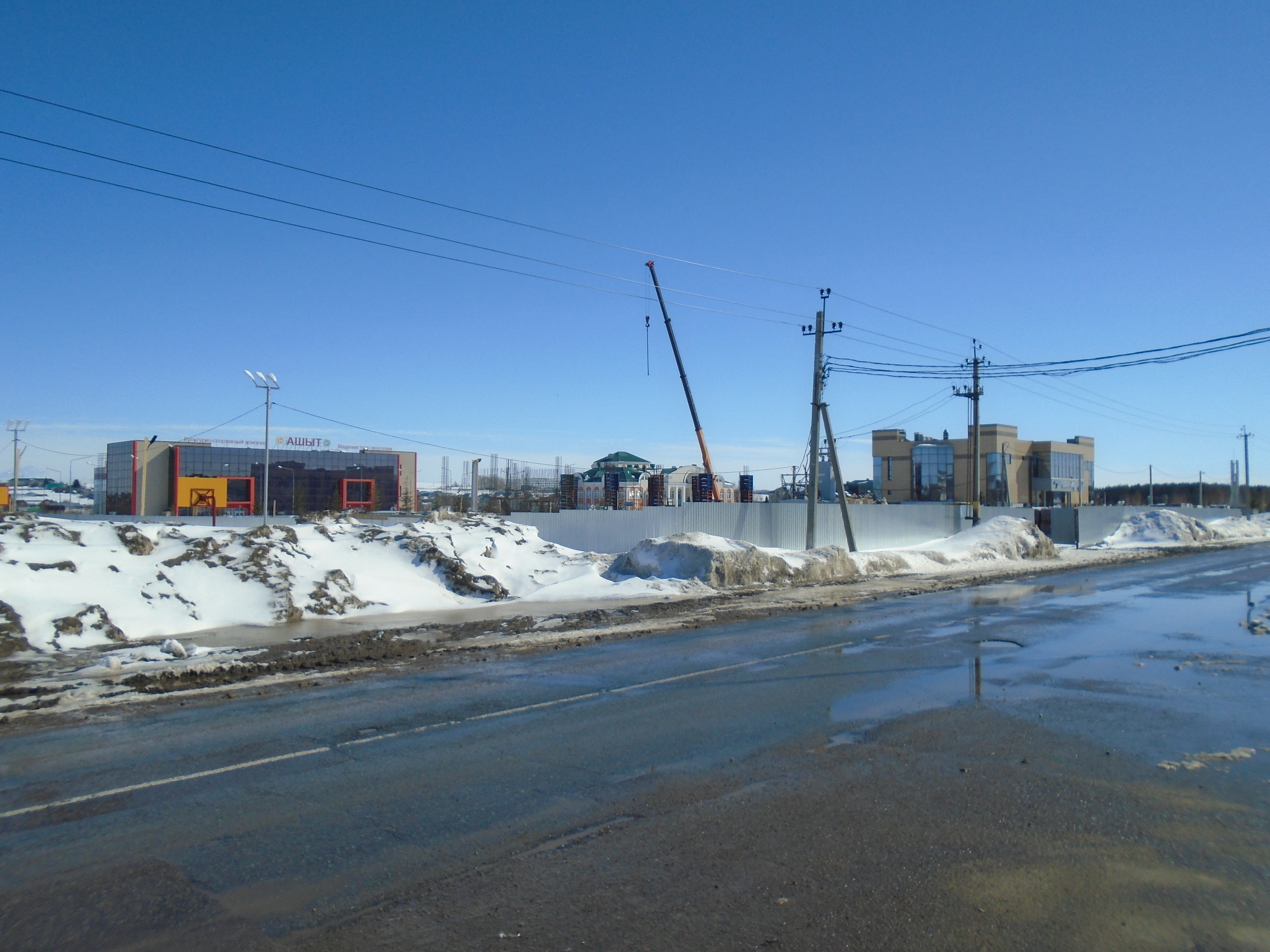

Bolshaya Atnya (Russian: Большая Атня, Tatar: Олы Әтнә) is a rural locality (a selo) and the administrative center of Atninsky District of the Republic of Tatarstan, Russia. Population: 3,536 (2010 census); 3,651 (2002 census);
