= State peasant =

Class of peasantry in 18th–19th century Russia

State peasants (Russian: Государственные крестьяне, gosudarstvennye krestiane) were a special social estate (class) of peasantry in 18th–19th century Russia, the number of which in some periods reached half of the agricultural population. In contrast to private serfs, state peasants were considered personally free, although their freedom of movement was restricted.

== History ==
The state peasants were created by decrees of Peter I and applied to population who were involved in land cultivation and agriculture: various peasant classes, single homesteaders (Russian military people on the border area adjoining the wild steppe), non-serf Russian people of the Russian North, the non-Russian peoples of the Volga, and the Ural regions.

The number of state peasants increased due to several factors: the confiscation of church lands (huge estates of the Russian Orthodox Church) by Catherine II, additional conquered territories (the Baltic States, the Right-bank Ukraine, Belarus, Crimea, the Caucasus), and the former serfs of the confiscated estates of the gentry of the Commonwealth, among others. These state peasants were replenished by runaway private serfs and peasants who were allowed to settle on the developed but un-tended lands (Bashkiria, New Russia, North Caucasus, etc.). This process (transition of runaway serfs to the category of state peasants on the colonized areas) was implicitly encouraged by the imperial Government.

In the second half of the 18th century, the government handed out to the nobility hundreds of thousands of state peasants (however, it happed mainly in the Western, ex-Polish parts of Russia, it never happened in Siberia or in the North of Russia and only few such cases are known in the Center of Russia) and converted many state peasants to the position of military settlers in the western provinces (peasants who were soldiers and farmers at the same time). Additionally, from the nobility came suggestions to eliminate the estate of state peasants, requesting the passage of the state-owned land to private hands. Still, it was never done. Nevertheless, the relative number of state peasants grew. At the time of the first census in 1724 the state peasants accounted for 19% of the population, and by the last census in 1858 they accounted for 45% of the population in the same territory.

== Position ==
State peasants lived on public land and paid taxes to the treasury. According to the first audit of the tax paying population of Russia (1719), there were in European Russia and Siberia 1,049,000 males (i.e. 19% of the total agricultural population), according to the 10th audit revision (1858) – 9,345 million (45.2% agricultural population). Presumably, the models for determining the position of legal state peasants in the Russian state were the crown peasants in Sweden. By law, the state peasants were seen as "free rural inhabitants." State peasants, unlike the peasants of landowners, were seen as persons with legal rights; they could appear in court, trade, and own property. State peasants were also allowed to conduct retail and wholesale trade and open factories. The land on which the state peasants worked was considered to be owned by the state, but the peasants had the right of use – in practice, farmers committed transactions as the owners of the land. In addition to the state owned land, in 1801 it was allowed that the farmers could buy and own the rights to private property and "uninhabited" land (that is, land without serfs ). State peasants had the right to use the allotment of 8 acres per capita in the land-poor provinces and 15 acres per capita in more open provinces. The actual holdings were reduced by the end of 1830 by up to 5 acres in 30 land-poor provinces and 3.1 acres in the 13 open provinces.

In practice, the bulk of the state peasants were making money that was paid as quit-rent to the state; in the Kingdom of Poland and the Baltic, state-owned estates were leased to private owners and the state peasants had to serve corvee (in ethnic Russian regions it did not happen, state peasant paid only the monetary dues); peasants initially paid grocery dues, followed by monetary dues later in history. In the 1st half of the 18th century, rents ranged from 7 roubles and 50 kopecks, to Rbls 10. The state peasants were also required to pay money as local taxes, paid a poll tax and serve other duties (road construction, waterway improvements, etc.). In the 18th century natural duties were abolished. By law they were considered as personally free agricultural inhabitants. For many collective obligations many peasants responded with mutual responsibility by an established code of conduct.

== Kiselyov reforms ==
As a result of eventual land shortage and increasing servile duties at the beginning of the 19th century, a progressive depletion of the state peasants resulted. This began to occur more frequently after state peasant unrest (for example the cholera riots and potato riots of 1834 and 1840–41) due to the reduction of holdings, the severity of dues, and other influences. The question of changing the management of state peasants was cause for numerous state projects.

In the 1830s the government began to reform the management of the state of the village. Through the years 1837–41 reform was implemented, developed by Pavel Kiselyov. He established the Ministry of State Property and its local authorities which were assigned "guardianship" over state peasants through the rural community. Corvée duties were eliminated, state peasantry in Lithuania, Belarus and Ukraine was stopped, renting state peasants out was eliminated, and the system of dues was modernized.

A staunch opponent of serfdom, Kiselev believed that freedom should be introduced gradually, "to destroy slavery by itself and without disruption of the state."

The state government and the peasants were to have the opportunity to decide their own affairs within the framework of the rural community. However, the peasants were still attached to the land. A radical reform of the state of the village was made possible only after the abolition of serfdom. Despite the gradual transformation, they still encountered resistance because landlords feared that the release of government serfs would give a dangerous example to their private possessory of peasants.

Kiselev intended to regulate the allotments and obligations serfs and partly subordinate them to the Ministry of State Property, but this outraged landowners and was not implemented.

However, in the preparation of the eventual peasant reform of 1861, the drafters of the legislation used the experience Kiselev reforms, especially in the organization of peasant self-determination and the legal status of the farmers.

== Buying out the land by the state peasants ==
On 24 November 1866, Russia adopted a law "On the Land Arrangement State Peasants", allowing the rural society to maintain land in their possession with the rights of "ownership". Redemption from the government of the property holdings was regulated by the law of 12 June 1886. After the implementation of these reforms, plots of state peasants were reduced by 10% in the central provinces and 44% – in the northern. Payments were calculated for 49½ years, and in some cases had to be made before 1931, but were canceled on 1 January 1907 as part of the Stolypin agrarian reform under the influence of the revolution in 1905.

== See also ==
- Social estates in the Russian Empire
- Serfdom in Russia
- Abolition of serfdom in Livonia
