= Social estates in the Russian Empire =

Social class in the Russian Empire

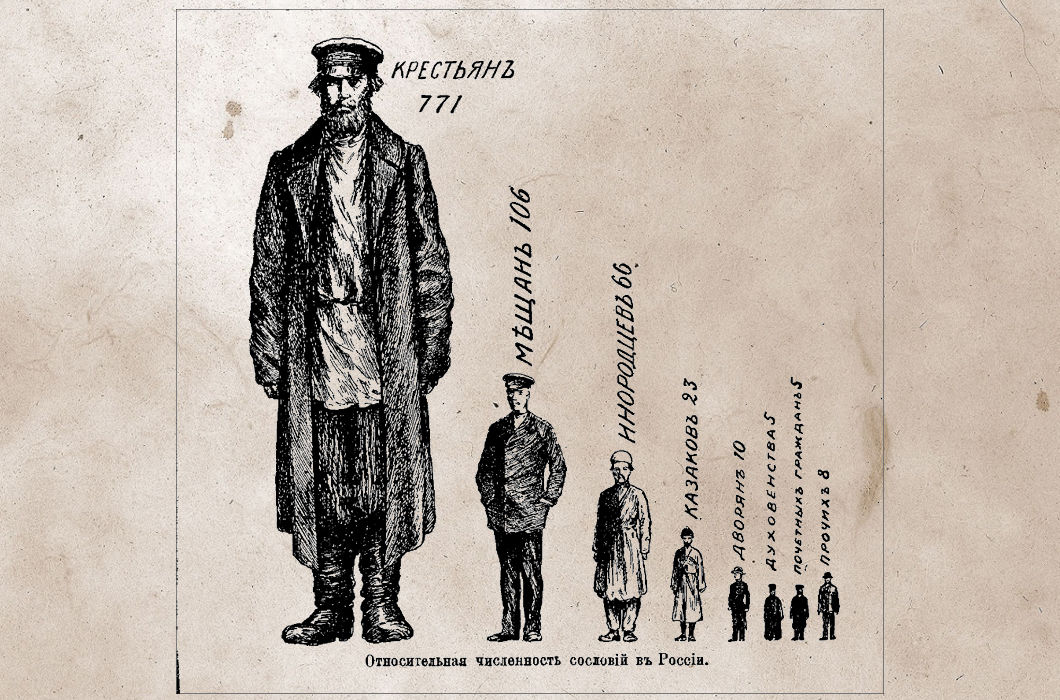
Relative sizes of sosloviyes, 1897. Numbers are per 1,000 of population

Social estates in the Russian Empire were denoted by the term soslovie (sosloviye). They were introduced in 18th-19th centuries to approximately match the European estate of the realm. The terms "сословие", "состояние", "сословное состояние" (in the meaning of the civil/legal estate) were used interchangeably. The four basic estates (nobility, clergy, peasantry, and urban dwellers, with a special treatment of inorodtsy) were subdivided further.

== Estates ==
The Code of the Law of the Russian Empire of 1832, vol. 9, "Laws about Estates" (Законы о состояниях) defined four major estates: dvoryans (nobility), clergy, urban dwellers and rural dwellers (peasants). The two former estates were non-taxable, the two latter were taxable estates (податные сословия), i.e., which had to pay the personal tax. Within these, more detailed categories were recognized:

1. Nobility was subdivided into hereditary nobility (Russian: потомственное дворянство) which was transferred to wives, children, and further direct legal descendants along the male (agnatic) line, and personal nobility (Russian: личное дворянство) which could, for instance, be acquired by admission to orders of knighthood of the Russian Empire. It was transferable only to wives.
2. Clergy was subdivided into "white" (priests) and "black" (monks).
3. Urban dwellers (burghers) (Городские обыватели, мещане) were categorized into потомственные почетные граждане (hereditary distinguished citizens), личные почетные граждане (personal distinguished citizens), merchantry (ru:купечество), urban commoners (ru:мещанство), and guilded craftspeople (цеховые ремесленники). The institution of distinguished citizenship (of the above two categories) was introduced by the manifesto of Nicholas I of Russia of April 10, 1832. The distinguished citizens ranked above merchantry and below nobility. They were freed of personal taxes, military service obligation (рекрутская повинность), corporal punishments, etc. Distinguished citizenship was available for persons with a scientific or scholar degree, graduates of certain schools, people of arts and distinguished merchants and industrialists subject to certain conditions. Dependent families were usually included into the estate of the head of the household. Urban commoners included people who had some real estate in a town, were engaged in some trade, craft, or service, and paid taxes. Subject to these conditions, a person could assign himself into this category, which was hereditary, and one may be excluded from it in the court of law or by the urban commoner's self-government (мещанская управа). Some of the category of rural dwellers (сельские обыватели) had permanent residence in towns, and they were correspondingly classified as "urban peasants" (городовые крестьяне).
4. Peasantry, rural dwellers who mainly subsisted on agriculture. This estate made up the great majority of the population and was obliged to provide the state with money in the form of taxes and supply the army with conscripts.
5. inorodtsy (инородцы), which included non-Russian and non-Orthodox native peoples of Siberia, Central Asia or Caucasus. As the Russian Empire expanded, different indigenous groups were granted privileges that differentiated them from the Russian peasantry, such as reduction or exemption of certain taxation, limited self-administration (including religious affairs), or exemptions from military service. An inorodets who converted to Orthodox Christianity was excluded from this estate and included into one of the other ones, most often peasantry, though sometimes allowed to maintain some of their privileges (such as exemption from military service or poll tax).

There also existed the category of military, across various estates, which included lower military ranks (higher ranks were associated with the estate of dvoryans), and discharged and indefinite-leave. A special military category were Cossacks.

A separate category, not assigned to any of the above estates were raznochintsy (literally "persons of miscellaneous ranks", but in fact having no rank at all). Finally, in Siberia, the estate of "exiled" was officially recognized, with the subcategory of "exiled nobility".

With the development of capitalism and the abolishment of the serfdom in Russia in the second half of the 19th century the estate paradigm no longer corresponded to the actual socio-economical stratification of the population, but the terminology was in use until the Russian Revolution of 1917. At the same time the legal and governmental system gradually became estate-independent, with the property grade (имущественный ценз) of a person playing the decisive role.

== Ranks ==
A separate stratification existed for governmental bureaucracy, who were classified according to the Table of Ranks. The higher ranks belonged to the sosloviye of dvoryanstvo, while the indication of a lower rank of a person was comparable to that of the indication of a soslovie for various formal purposes (e.g., for the Russian Empire Census).
