= Arsky District =

Arsky District Арский район (Russian)
- District

Other transcription(s)
  - Tatar: Арча районы
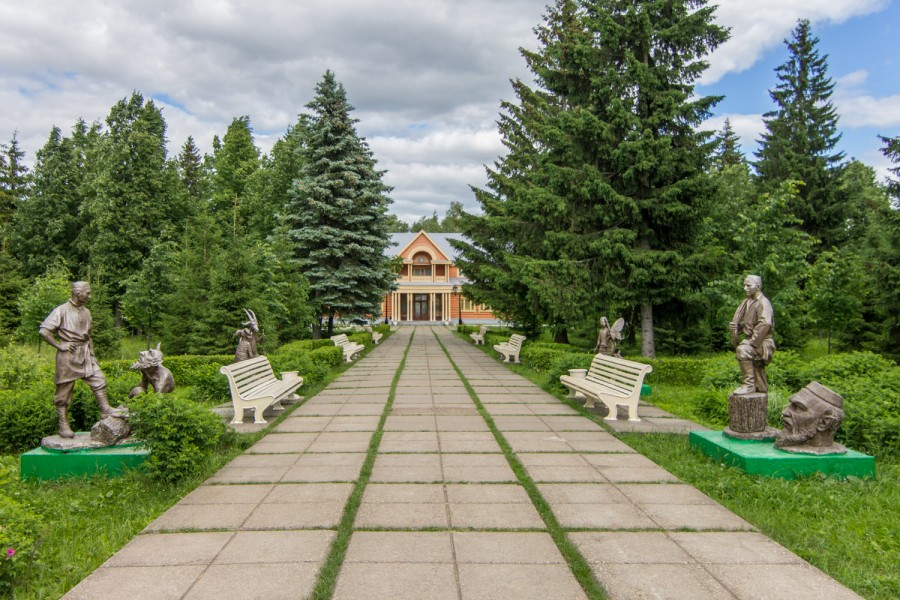
- Forest Tukai-Kyrlay, Arsky District

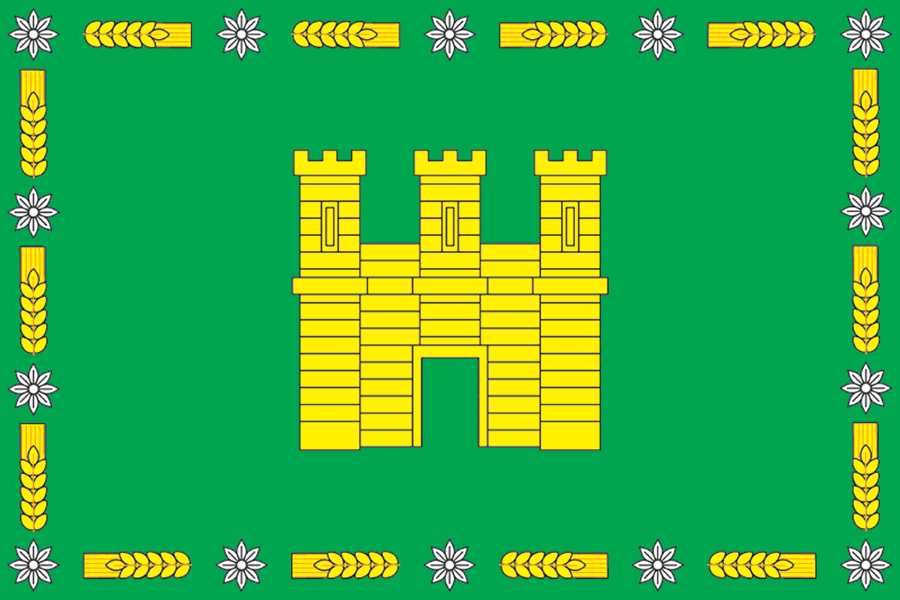
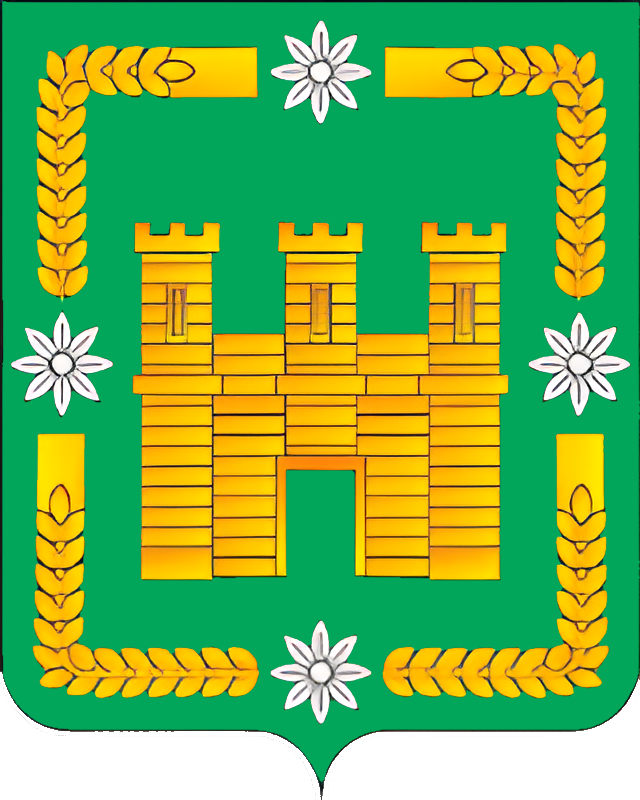
- Flag Coat of arms
- Location of Arsky District in the Republic of Tatarstan
- Coordinates: 56°12′N 49°51′E
- Country: Russia
- Federal subject: Tatarstan
- Established: September 10, 1930
- Administrative center: Arsk

Area
  - Total: 1,843.6 km^{2} (711.8 sq mi)

Population (2010 Census)
  - Total: 51,667
  - Density: 28.025/km^{2} (72.585/sq mi)
  - Urban: 35.1%
  - Rural: 64.9%

Administrative structure
  - Inhabited localities: 1 cities/towns, 127 rural localities

Municipal structure
  - Municipally incorporated as: Arsky Municipal District
  - Municipal divisions: 1 urban settlements, 16 rural settlements
- Time zone: UTC+3 (MSK)
- OKTMO ID: 92612000
- Website: http://arsk.tatarstan.ru/

Arsky District (Russian: А́рский райо́н; Tatar: Арча районы) – is a territorial administrative unit and municipal district of the Republic of Tatarstan within the Russian Federation. The district is located in the northern part of the republic. The administrative center is the city of Arsk.

The district has several natural monuments including the source of the Kazanka river, Yanga-Salinsky slope, the Korsin grey heron colony, Tukai-kyrlay forest, Ayu Urmany, Kazanka and Shoshma rivers.

== Geography ==
The Arsk district is one of the largest districts by land area in the Republic of Tatarstan encompassing a total of 1,843.7 km^{2}. Several highways connecting Kazan with the Kirov region, Udmurtia and Perm Oblast cross the district. The Arsky District borders the Baltasinsky, Sabinsky, Tyulyachinsky, Pestrechinsky, Vysokogorsky, and Atninsky districts of Tatarstan as well as the Republic of Mari El (Mari-Tureksky District and Morkinsky District).

The general topography of the region is a hilly plain (height 170–266 m), dissected by the valleys of the Kazanka rivers (and its tributaries the Atynka, Verezinka, Oya and Kismes), Ashit, and Shoshma. Forests cover about 12% of the land area of the district.

The administrative center of the district is located 60 km from the capital of the republic in Kazan.

== Coat of arms ==
The coat of arms of the Arsk district was approved at the meeting of the Arsk District Council on March 17, 2006. It is made in the form of a green shield inset with the image of a golden fortress, asters and ears of corn, symbolizing agricultural focus of the district. The flag of Arsk region is based on the district coat of arms and has a rectangular shape with the same emblems depicted on it.

== History ==
Arsk has been known since the XII-XIII centuries as a Bulgar fortress. The first mention of the settlement was discovered in Russian chronicles describing the conquest of the Kazan throne by the Siberian Khan Mamuk in 1496-1497. In 1552, the troops of the governor Alexander Gorbatyi-Shuisky and Andrey Kurbsky burned the city. Three years later, a Russian fortress was erected in its place.

In 1781-1796, Arsk held the status of a district town (or uyezd) of the Kazan governorship, then becoming a provincial town of the Kazan district. Through from the 18th and early 19th centuries, its lands were inhabited by settlements of military settlers who engaged in agriculture, cattle breeding, blacksmith, brickmaking and other trades.

Until 1920, the territory of the modern Arsk district was part of the Kazan district of the Kazan Province. In the period 1920 to 1930, these territories briefly belonged to the Arsk canton. The Arsk district was formed on August 10, 1930. At that time, the district included 64 villages and 113 settlements with overall population of 64,136 residents.

From 2006 to 2014 the head of the district was Almas Nazirov. Since 2015, this position has been held by Ilshtat Nuriev. The Executive Committee is headed by Rasul Mukharyamov

== Population ==
As of 2020, 51,291 people resided in the district. The ethnic composition of the district is 92.8% Tatars, 5.9% Russians, and 0.5% Mari.

== Municipal-territorial structure ==
The Arsk municipal district is divided into one urban and 16 rural settlements which are further subdivided into 128 settlements. In 2010, the Law of the Republic of Tatarstan No. 18-ZRT united the "city of Arsk" and "Tyubyak-Chekurchinskoe rural settlement" into the municipal formation "city of Arsk", and the villages of Ak-Chishma and Naratlyk, which were part of the Shushmabash rural settlement, and the village the adjacent territory was assigned to the Tashkichi rural settlement.

== Economy ==
=== State of the Art ===
According to official figures from 2020, the Arsk district placed 35th out of 43 in rankings of the quality of life in Tatarstan municipalities. The district faces severe problems related to infrastructure development as around 127 settlements do not have access to sewage services while 59% of all roads are in poor condition.

Agriculture constitutes the main sector of the district economy. Residents engage in fish farming, meat and dairy cattle breeding and sheep herding. Additionally, peat, loose limestone and dolomite are mined in the area. Large enterprises operating in the district include the Arskiy kirpichniy zavod, Arskiy elevator, Arsknefteprodukt, Arskiy Rybkhoz and Arskiy Dairy Plant.

=== Investment potential ===
In 2019 Arsk district attracted 404 million rubbles of investment (in addition to budgetary funds and revenues from small business). As of the first half of 2020, the region's investment in fixed capital assets of the region for amounted to 865 million rubles over the full range of economic entities or 0.4% of the total investment in the republic of Tatarstan during this period. In the first half of 2020, more than 7,000 m2 of housing were commissioned in the Arsk region. Most of the district is occupied for residential or agricultural purposes while territory currently set aside for commercial constitutes only 402 m2.

The Arsk agro-industrial park with an area of 21 hectares has been under construction in the district since 2019. The Sozidanie company is a main investor in the project which has drawn 140 million rubles in investment. It is expected that the park will be equipped with shops for receiving and processing milk, processing vegetables and producing juices, a meat processing complex, and plant for protein-vitamin mineral supplements. It the project is intended to attract five residents to the industrial park, which will create at least 300 jobs.

=== Transport ===
The total length of the road network in the region is 1101 km. Other major transportation arteries include the Kazan - Yekaterinburg railway, the Kazan - Perm, Bolshaya Atnya - Arsk and Arsk - Novy Kiner highways which pass through the territory of the district.

== Social and Cultural Resources ==
As of 2020, there were 105 secondary schools, a children's art school, a children's and youth sports school "Archa", three libraries and a schoolchildren's palace operating in the Arsk district. Cultural resources of the district include 78 recreational centers and other clubs, 57 libraries and eight museums. Prominent among newspapers in the district is "Archa khuburlure" ("Arskiy Vestnik"), which is published in Russian and in the Tatar language.
