= Yuvas =

Yuvas Ювас
- Village
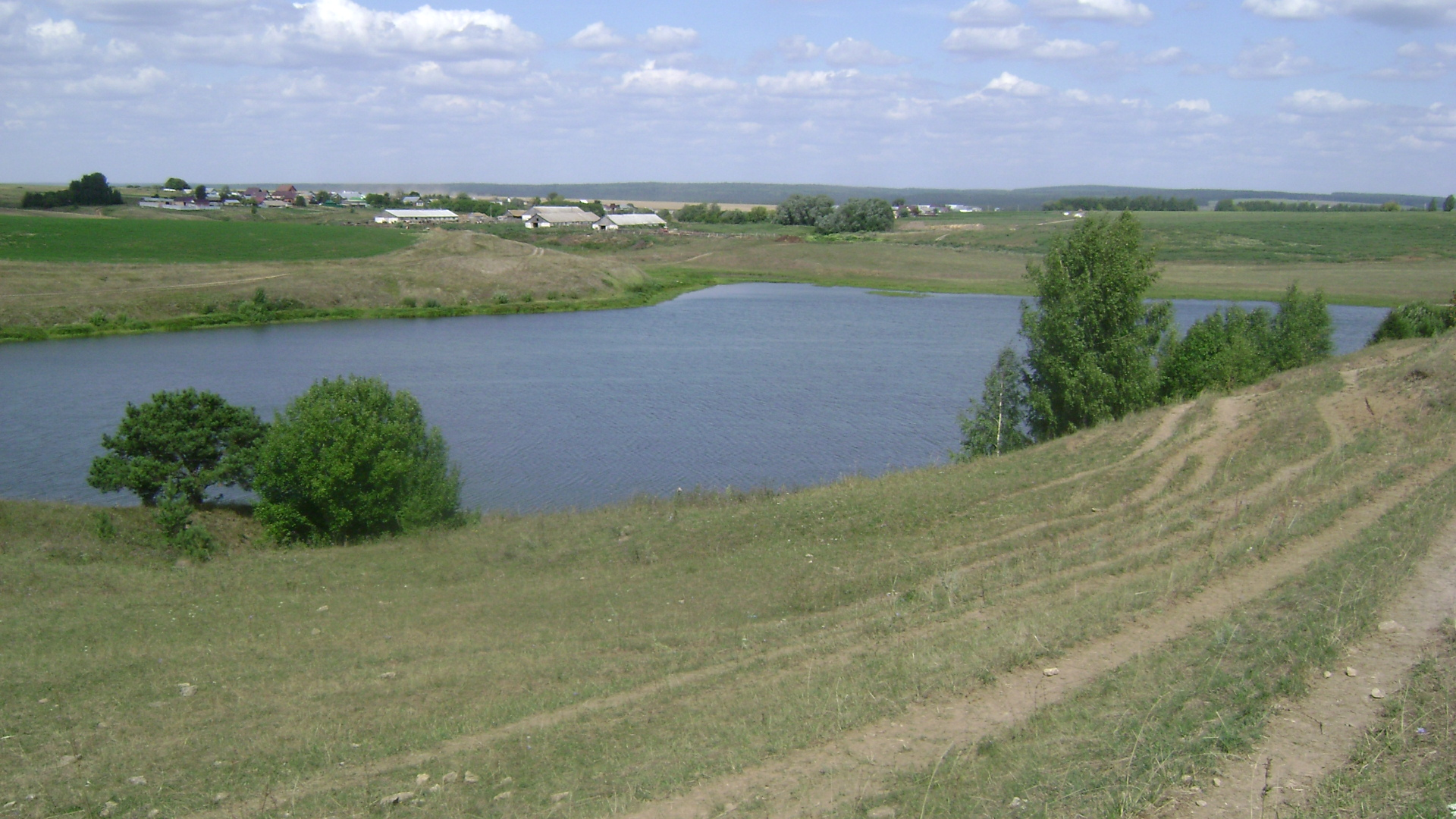
- Lake Mochalnoye: Vysokogorsky District of the Republic of Tatarstan, south of the village of Yuvas

- Location within Tatarstan
- Coordinates: 56.158794°N 49.036588°E
- Country: Russia
- Region: Tatarstan
- District: Vysokogorsky District
- Time zone: UTC+3:00

Yuvas (Tatar: Ювас, romanized: Yuwas; Russian: Ювас) is a rural locality (a village) in Vysokogorsky District, Tatarstan, Russia. The population was 125 as of 2010.

== Geography ==
Yuvas is located 36 kilometres (22 mi) northwest of Vysokaya Gora, the district's administrative centre, and 65 kilometres (40 mi) north of Kazan, the republic's capital, by road.

== History ==
The earliest known record of the settlement dates from the 18th century.

From the 18th century to the first half of the 19th century, the village's residents belonged to the social estate of state peasants.

By the beginning of the 20th century, the village had a mosque, a madrasa, a blacksmith shop and four small shops.

Before the creation of the Tatar ASSR in 1920, it was part of Kazansky Uyezd of Kazan Governorate. From 1920, it was part of Arsk Canton; after the creation of districts in the Tatar ASSR (Tatarstan), it was located in Dubyazsky (1930–1963), Zelenodolsky (1963–1965) and Vysokogorsky districts.
