= Saya, Republic of Tatarstan =

Saya Сая
- selo
- Location within Tatarstan
- Country: Russia
- Region: Tatarstan
- District: Biektaw District
- Time zone: UTC+3:00

Saya (Tatar: Сая, romanized: Saya) is a rural locality (a selo) in Biektaw District, Tatarstan. The population was 397 as of 2010.

== Geography ==
Saya, Republic of Tatarstan is located 17 km northwest of Biektaw, district's administrative centre, and 45 km north of Kazan, republic's capital, by road.

== History ==
The earliest known record of the settlement dates from the 17th century.

From 18th to the first half of the 19th centuries village's residents belonged to the social estate of state peasants.

By the beginning of the twentieth century, village had a mosque, a mekteb, a blacksmith shop and 4 small shops.

Before the creation of the Tatar ASSR in 1920 was a part of Qazan Uyezd of Qazan Governorate. Since 1920 was a part of Arça Canton; after the creation of districts in Tatar ASSR (Tatarstan) in Döbyaz (1930–1963), Yäşel Üzän (1963–1965) and Biektaw districts.
