= Mamonino =

Mamonino Аяз Иле
- Selo
- Location within Tatarstan
- Coordinates: 56.045951°N 49.245644°E
- Country: Russia
- Region: Tatarstan
- District: Vysokogorsky District
- Time zone: UTC+3:00

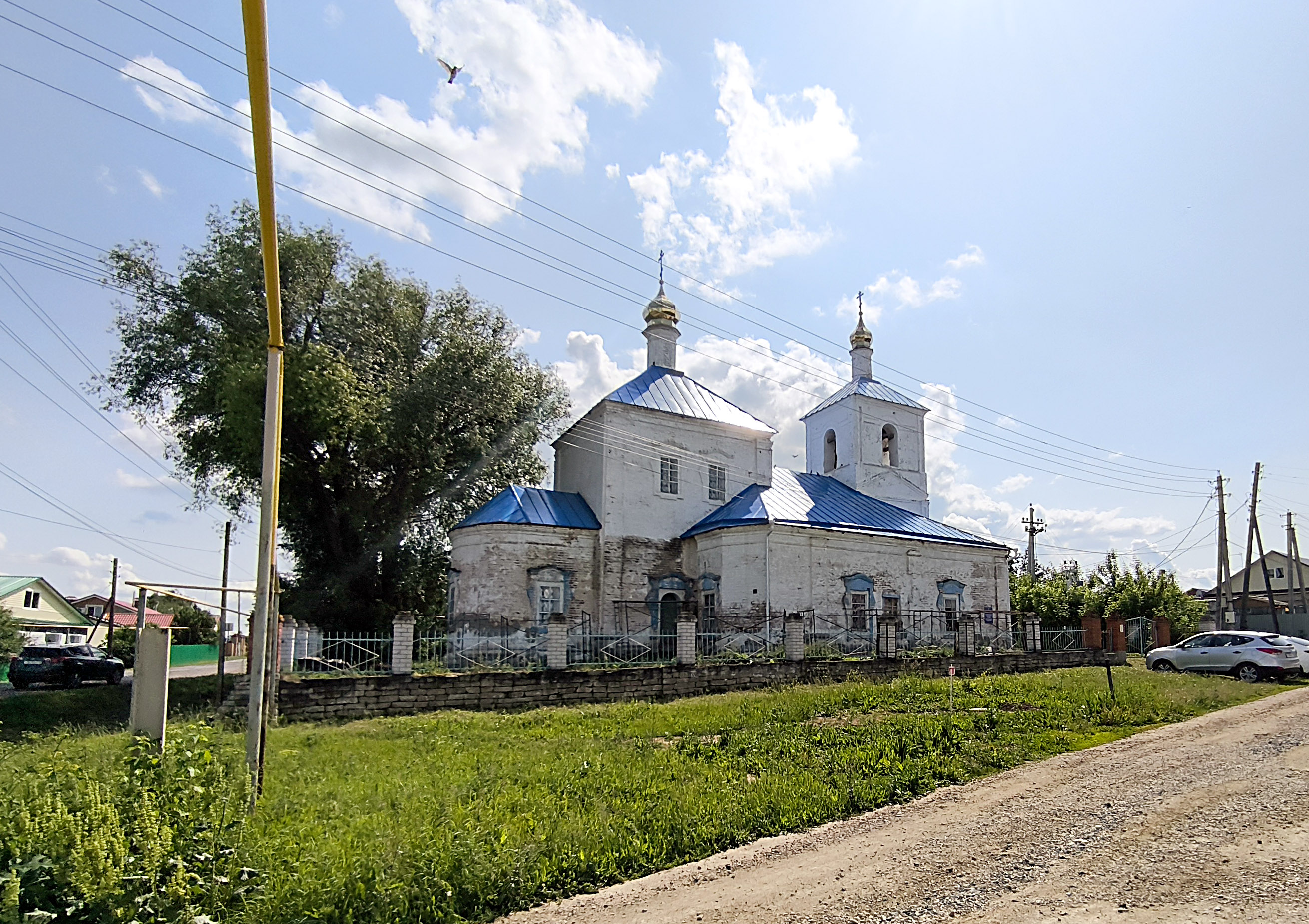
Church of the Ascension: Mamonino, Vysokogorsky District, Tatarstan

Mamonino (Tatar: Аяз Иле, romanized: Ayaz İle; Russian: Мамонино) is a rural locality (a selo) in Vysokogorsky District, Tatarstan, Russia. The population was 191 as of 2010.

== Geography ==
Ayaz İle is located 17 kilometres (11 mi) north of Vysokaya Gora, the district's administrative centre, and 41 kilometres (25 mi) north of Kazan, the republic's capital, by road.

== History ==
The village already existed during the period of the Khanate of Kazan.

From the 18th century to the first half of the 19th century, the village's residents belonged to the social estate of privately owned peasants.

By the beginning of the 20th century, the village had a church, a zemstvo school, two watermills, two beer shops, a wine shop and four small shops.

Before the creation of the Tatar ASSR in 1920, it was part of Kazansky Uyezd of Kazan Governorate. From 1920, it was part of Arsk Canton; after the creation of districts in the Tatar ASSR (Tatarstan), it was located in Dubyazsky (1930–1963), Zelenodolsky (1963–1965) and Vysokogorsky districts.
