= Qodaş, Vysokogorsky District =

Locality in Tatarstan, Russia

Qodaş Кодаш
- derevnya
- Location within Tatarstan
- Country: Russia
- Region: Tatarstan
- District: Biektaw District
- Time zone: UTC+3:00

Qodaş (Tatar: Кодаш, romanized: Qodaş) is a rural locality (a derevnya) in Biektaw District, Tatarstan. The population was 87 as of 2010.

== Geography ==
Qodaş is located 47 km northwest of Biektaw, district's administrative centre, and 49 km northwest of Qazan, republic's capital, by road.

== History ==
The village was established in the 17th century.

From 18th to the first half of the 19th centuries village's residents belonged to the social estate of state peasants.

By the beginning of the twentieth century, village had a mosque, a madrasa and 2 small shops.

Before the creation of the Tatar ASSR in 1920 was a part of Qazan Uyezd of Qazan Governorate. Since 1920 was a part of Arça Canton; after the creation of districts in Tatar ASSR (Tatarstan) in Döbyaz (1930–1963), Yäşel Üzän (1963–1965) and Biektaw districts.
