= Çırşı, Vysokogorsky District =

Çırşı Чыршы
- selo
- Location within Tatarstan
- Country: Russia
- Region: Tatarstan
- District: Biektaw District
- Time zone: UTC+3:00

Çırşı (Tatar: Чыршы, romanized: Çırşı) is a rural locality (a selo) in Biektaw District, Tatarstan. The population was 322 as of 2010.

== Geography ==
Çırşı is located 20 km north of Biektaw, district's administrative centre, and 48 km north of Qazan, republic's capital, by road.

== History ==
The village already existed during the period of the Khanate of Qazan.

From 18th to the first half of the 19th centuries village's residents belonged to the social estate of state peasants.

By the beginning of the twentieth century, village had a mosque, a madrasa, a blacksmith shop and 3 small shops.

Before the creation of the Tatar ASSR in 1920 was a part of Qazan Uyezd of Qazan Governorate. Since 1920 was a part of Arça Canton; after the creation of districts in Tatar ASSR (Tatarstan) in Döbyaz (1930–1963), Yäşel Üzän (1963–1965) and Biektaw districts.
