= Olı Solabaş =

Olı Solabaş Олы Солабаш
- selo
- Location within Tatarstan
- Country: Russia
- Region: Tatarstan
- District: Biektaw District
- Time zone: UTC+3:00

Olı Solabaş (Tatar: Олы Солабаш, romanized: Olı Solabaş) is a rural locality (a selo) in Biektaw District, Tatarstan. The population was 36 as of 2010.

== Geography ==
Olı Solabaş is located 31 km north of Biektaw, the district's administrative centre, and 23 km north of Qazan, the republic's capital, by road.

== History ==
The village already existed during the period of the Qazan Khanate.

From the 18th to the first half of the 19th centuries, the village's residents belonged to the social estate of state peasants.

By the beginning of the twentieth century, the village had a mosque, a mekteb, two windmills, a grain scourer, and six small shops.

Before the creation of the Tatar ASSR in 1920, the village was a part of Qazan Uyezd of Qazan Governorate. Since 1920, the village was a part of Arça Canton; after the creation of districts in Tatar ASSR (Tatarstan) in the Döbyaz (1930–1963), Yäşel Üzän (1963–1965), and Biektaw districts.
