= Olı Köyek =

Olı Köyek Олы Көек
- selo
- Location within Tatarstan
- Country: Russia
- Region: Tatarstan
- District: Biektaw District
- Time zone: UTC+3:00

Olı Köyek (Tatar: Олы Көек, romanized: Olı Köyek) is a rural locality (a selo) in Biektaw District, Tatarstan. The population was 81 as of 2010.

== Geography ==
Olı Köyek is located 48 km northwest of Biektaw, district's administrative centre, and 50 km northwest of Qazan, republic's capital, by road.

== History ==
The village already existed during the period of the Khanate of Qazan.Its name derives from the words olı (big) and köyek (burnt place in the forest).

From 18th to the first half of the 19th centuries village's residents belonged to the social estate of state peasants.

By the beginning of the twentieth century, village had a mosque, a mekteb, a blacksmith shop and 4 small shops.

Before the creation of the Tatar ASSR in 1920 was a part of Qazan Uyezd of Qazan Governorate. Since 1920 was a part of Arça Canton; after the creation of districts in Tatar ASSR (Tatarstan) in Döbyaz (1930–1963), Yäşel Üzän (1963–1965) and Biektaw districts.
