= Olıyaz, Vysokogorsky District =

Olıyaz Олыяз
- derevnya
- Location within Tatarstan
- Country: Russia
- Region: Tatarstan
- District: Biektaw District
- Time zone: UTC+3:00

Olıyaz (Tatar: Олыяз, romanized: Olıyaz) is a rural locality (a derevnya) in Biektaw District, Tatarstan. The population was 147 as of 2010.

== Geography ==
Olıyaz is located 27 km north of Biektaw, district's administrative centre, and 56 km north of Qazan, republic's capital, by road.

== History ==
The earliest known record of the settlement dates from 1648.

From 18th to the first half of the 19th centuries village's residents belonged to the social estate of state peasants.

By the beginning of the twentieth century, village had a mosque, a mekteb and 3 small shops.

Before the creation of the Tatar ASSR in 1920 was a part of Qazan Uyezd of Qazan Governorate. Since 1920 was a part of Arça Canton; after the creation of districts in Tatar ASSR (Tatarstan) in Döbyaz (1930–1963), Yäşel Üzän (1963–1965) and Biektaw districts.
