= Macar, Republic of Tatarstan =

Macar Маҗар
- derevnya
- Location within Tatarstan
- Country: Russia
- Region: Tatarstan
- District: Biektaw District
- Time zone: UTC+3:00

Macar (Tatar: Маҗар, romanized: Macar) is a rural locality (a derevnya) in Biektaw District, Tatarstan. The population was 3 as of 2010.

== Geography ==
Macar is located 24 km northwest of Biektaw, district's administrative centre, and 36 km north of Qazan, republic's capital, by road.

== History ==
The village already existed during the period of the Qazan Khanate.

From 18th to the first half of the 19th centuries village's residents belonged to the social estate of state peasants.

By the beginning of the twentieth century, village had a mosque, a mekteb and 4 small shops.

Before the creation of the Tatar ASSR in 1920 was a part of Qazan Uyezd of Qazan Governorate. Since 1920 was a part of Arça Canton; after the creation of districts in Tatar ASSR (Tatarstan) in Döbyaz (1930–1963), Yäşel Üzän (1963–1965) and Biektaw districts.
