= Shipshek =

Shipshek Шыпшыек
- Village
- Location within Tatarstan
- Coordinates: 56.144441°N 49.239077°E
- Country: Russia
- Region: Tatarstan
- District: Vysokogorsky District
- Time zone: UTC+3:00

Shipshek (Tatar: Шыпшыек, romanized: Şıpşıyıq; Russian: Шипшек) is a rural locality (a village) in Vysokogorsky District, Tatarstan, Russia. The population was 2 as of 2010.

== Geography ==
Shipshek is located 30 kilometres (19 mi) north of Vysokaya Gora, the district's administrative centre, and 54 kilometres (34 mi) north of Kazan, the republic's capital, by road.

== History ==
The earliest known record of the settlement dates from 1650.

From the 18th century to the first half of the 19th century, the village's residents belonged to the social estate of state peasants.

By the beginning of the 20th century, the village had a mosque, a mekteb and a small shop.

Before the creation of the Tatar ASSR in 1920, it was part of Kazansky Uyezd of Kazan Governorate. From 1920, it was a part of Arsk Canton; after the creation of districts in the Tatar ASSR (Tatarstan), it was located in Dubyazsky (1930–1963), Zelenodolsky (1963–1965) and Vysokogorsky districts.
