= Chuvashli =

Rural locality in Biektaw District, Tatarstan

Chuvashli Чуаш Иле
- Selo
- Location within Tatarstan
- Coordinates: 56.066555°N 49.007977°E
- Country: Russia
- Region: Tatarstan
- District: Vysokogorsky District
- Time zone: UTC+3:00

Chuvashli (Tatar: Чуаш Иле, romanized: Çuaş İle; Russian: Чувашли) is a rural locality (a selo) in Vysokogorsky District, Tatarstan, Russia. The population was 131 as of 2010.

== Geography ==
Chuvashli is located 26 kilometres (16 mi) northwest of Vysokaya Gora, the district's administrative centre, and 38 kilometres (24 mi) north of Kazan, the republic's capital, by road.

== History ==
The earliest known record of the settlement dates from the 17th century.

From the 18th century to the first half of the 19th century, the village's residents belonged to the social estate of state peasants.

By the beginning of the 20th century, the village had two mosques, two mektebs, three windmills and three small shops.

Before the creation of the Tatar ASSR in 1920, it was part of Kazansky Uyezd of Kazan Governorate. From 1920, it was part of Arsk Canton; after the creation of districts in the Tatar ASSR (Tatarstan), it was located in Dubyazsky (1930–1963), Zelenodolsky (1963–1965) and Vysokogorsky districts.
