= Ibrya =

Ibrya Өбрә
- Village
- Location within Tatarstan
- Coordinates: 56.028645°N 49.194792°E
- Country: Russia
- Region: Tatarstan
- District: Vysokogorsky District
- Time zone: UTC+3:00

Ibrya (Tatar: Өбрә, romanized: Öbrä; Russian: Ибря) is a rural locality (a village) in Vysokogorsky District, Tatarstan, Russia. The population was 148 as of 2010.

== Geography ==
Ibrya is located 15 kilometres (9.3 mi) northwest of Vysokaya Gora, the district's administrative centre, and 31 kilometres (19 mi) north of Kazan, the republic's capital, by road.

== History ==
The village already existed during the period of the Khanate of Kazan.

From the 18th century to the first half of the 19th century, the village's residents belonged to the social estate of state peasants.

By the beginning of the 20th century, the village had a mosque and two small shops.

Before the creation of the Tatar ASSR in 1920, it was part of Kazansky Uyezd of Kazan Governorate. From 1920, it was part of Arsk Canton; after the creation of districts in the Tatar ASSR (Tatarstan), it was located in Dubyazsky (1930–1963), Zelenodolsky (1963–1965) and Vysokogorsky districts.
