= Äsän =

Äsän Әсән
- derevnya
- Location within Tatarstan
- Country: Russia
- Region: Tatarstan
- District: Vysokogorsky District
- Time zone: UTC+3:00

Äsän (Tatar: Әсән, romanized: Äsän) is a rural locality (a derevnya) in Vysokogorsky District, Tatarstan. The population was 1 as of 2010.

== Geography ==
Äsän is located 34 km northwest of Biektaw, district's administrative centre, and 63 km north of Qazan, republic's capital, by road.

== History ==
The earliest known record of the settlement dates from the 16th century.

From 18th to the first half of the 19th centuries village's residents belonged to the social estate of state peasants.

By the beginning of the twentieth century, village had a mosque, a madrasa, a blacksmith shop and 4 small shops.

Before the creation of the Tatar ASSR in 1920 was a part of Qazan Uyezd of Qazan Governorate. Since 1920 was a part of Arça Canton; after the creation of districts in Tatar ASSR (Tatarstan) in Döbyaz (1930–1963), Yäşel Üzän (1963–1965) and Biektaw districts.
