= Apsabash =

Apsabash Апсабаш
- Village
- Location within Tatarstan
- Coordinates: 56.103236°N 48.900861°E
- Country: Russia
- Region: Tatarstan
- District: Vysokogorsky District
- Time zone: UTC+3:00

Apsabash (Tatar: Апсабаш, romanized: Apsabaş; Russian: Апсабаш) is a rural locality (a village) in Vysokogorsky District, Tatarstan, Russia. The population was 36 as of 2010.

== Geography ==
Apsabash is located 47 kilometres (29 mi) northwest of Vysokaya Gora, the district's administrative centre, and 50 kilometres (31 mi) northwest of Kazan, the republic's capital, by road.

== History ==
The village was established in the 16th century.

From the 18th century to the first half of the 19th century, the village's residents belonged to the social estate of state peasants.

By the beginning of the 20th century, the village had a mosque, a mekteb and two watermills.

Before the creation of the Tatar ASSR in 1920, it was part of Kazansky Uyezd of Kazan Governorate. From 1920, it was part of Arsk Canton; after the creation of districts in the Tatar ASSR (Tatarstan), it was located in Dubyazsky (1930–1963), Zelenodolsky (1963–1965) and Vysokogorsky districts.
