= Keçe Qawal =

Keçe Qawal Кече Кавал
- derevnya
- Location within Tatarstan
- Country: Russia
- Region: Tatarstan
- District: Biektaw District
- Time zone: UTC+3:00

Keçe Qawal (Tatar: Кече Кавал, romanized: Keçe Qawal) is a rural locality (a derevnya) in Biektaw District, Tatarstan. The population was 30 as of 2010.

== Geography ==
Keçe Qawal is located 22 km northwest of Biektaw, district's administrative centre, and 38 km north of Qazan, republic's capital, by road.

== History ==
The earliest known record of the settlement dates from 1617.

From 18th to the first half of the 19th centuries village's residents belonged to the social estate of state peasants.

By the beginning of the twentieth century, village had a mosque, a mekteb, 2 windmills, a grain scourer and 1 small shop.

Before the creation of the Tatar ASSR in 1920 was a part of Qazan Uyezd of Qazan Governorate. Since 1920 was a part of Arça Canton; after the creation of districts in Tatar ASSR (Tatarstan) in Döbyaz (1930–1963), Yäşel Üzän (1963–1965) and Biektaw districts.
