= Maly Bitaman =

Maly Bitaman Кече Битаман
- Village
- Location within Tatarstan
- Coordinates: 56.190963°N 49.062004°E
- Country: Russia
- Region: Tatarstan
- District: Vysokogorsky District
- Time zone: UTC+3:00

Maly Bitaman (Tatar: Кече Битаман, romanized: Keçe Bitaman; Russian: Малый Битаман) is a rural locality (a village) in Vysokogorsky District, Tatarstan, Russia. The population was 204 as of 2010.

== Geography ==
Maly Bitaman is located 36 kilometres (22 mi) northwest of Vysokaya Gora, the district's administrative centre, and 64 kilometres (40 mi) north of Kazan, the republic's capital, by road.

== History ==
The earliest known record of the settlement dates from the 18th century.

From the 18th century to the first half of the 19th century, the village's residents belonged to the social estate of state peasants.

By the beginning of the 20th century, the village had a mosque and a small shop.

Before the creation of the Tatar ASSR in 1920, it was part of Tsaryovokokshaysky Uyezd of Kazan Governorate. From 1920, it was part of Arsk Canton; after the creation of districts in the Tatar ASSR (Tatarstan), it was located in Dubyazsky (1930–1963), Zelenodolsky (1963–1965) and Vysokogorsky districts.
