= Alan-Bekser =

Alan-Bekser Алан-Бәксәр
- Selo
- Location within Tatarstan
- Coordinates: 56.179340°N 49.107375°E
- Country: Russia
- Region: Tatarstan
- District: Vysokogorsky District
- Time zone: UTC+3:00

Alan-Bekser (Tatar: Алан-Бәксәр, romanized: Alan-Bäksär; Russian: Алан-Бексер)) is a rural locality (a selo) in Vysokogorsky District, Tatarstan, Russia. The population was 327 as of 2010.

== Geography ==
Alan-Bekser is located 34 kilometres (21 mi) northwest of Vysokaya Gora, the district's administrative centre, and 60 kilometres (37 mi) north of Kazan, the republic's capital, by road.

== History ==
The earliest known record of the settlement dates from the 18th century.

From the 18th century to the first half of the 19th century, the village's residents belonged to the social estate of state peasants.

By the beginning of the 20th century, the village had a eukterion, a zemstvo school, a windmill, two grain scourers, two factories and four small shops.

Before the creation of the Tatar ASSR in 1920, it was part of Kazansky Uyezd of Kazan Governorate. From 1920, it was a part of Arsk Canton; after the creation of districts in the Tatar ASSR (Tatarstan), it was located in Dubyazsky (1930–1963), Zelenodolsky (1963–1965) and Vysokogorsky districts.
