= Mämdäl =

Mämdäl Мәмдәл
- selo
- Location within Tatarstan
- Country: Russia
- Region: Tatarstan
- District: Biektaw District
- Time zone: UTC+3:00

Mämdäl (Tatar: Мәмдәл, romanized: Mämdäl) is a rural locality (a selo) in Biektaw District, Tatarstan. The population was 508 as of 2010.

== Geography ==
Mämdäl is located 31 km north of Biektaw, district's administrative centre, and 45 km north of Qazan, republic's capital, by road.

== History ==
The earliest known record of the settlement dates from the 17th century.

From 18th to the first half of the 19th centuries village's residents belonged to the social estate of state peasants.

By the beginning of the twentieth century, village had 2 mosques, a madrasa, a mekteb, a veterinary paramedic station, a blacksmith shop, 3 windmills, 2 match factories, 10 small shops and a bazaar on Tuesdays.

Before the creation of the Tatar ASSR in 1920 was a part of Qazan Uyezd of Qazan Governorate. Since 1920 was a part of Arça Canton; after the creation of districts in Tatar ASSR (Tatarstan) in Döbyaz (1930–1963), Yäşel Üzän (1963–1965) and Biektaw districts.
