= Olı Bitaman =

Olı Bitaman Олы Битаман
- selo
- Location within Tatarstan
- Country: Russia
- Region: Tatarstan
- District: Biektaw District
- Time zone: UTC+3:00

Olı Bitaman (Tatar: Олы Битаман, romanized: Olı Bitaman) is a rural locality (a selo) in Biektaw District, Tatarstan. The population was 607 as of 2010.

== Geography ==
Olı Bitaman is located 36 km northwest of Biektaw, district's administrative centre, and 63 km north of Qazan, republic's capital, by road.

== History ==
The village already existed during the period of the Khanate of Qazan.

From 18th to the first half of the 19th centuries village's residents belonged to the social estate of state peasants.

By the beginning of the twentieth century, village had a mosque, a mekteb and 4 small shops.

Before the creation of the Tatar ASSR in 1920 was a part of Qazan Uyezd of Qazan Governorate. Since 1920 was a part of Arça Canton; after the creation of districts in Tatar ASSR (Tatarstan) in Döbyaz (1930–1963), Yäşel Üzän (1963–1965) and Biektaw districts.
