= Qayınlıq, Vysokogorsky District =

Qayınlıq Каенлык
- selo
- Location within Tatarstan
- Country: Russia
- Region: Tatarstan
- District: Biektaw District
- Time zone: UTC+3:00

Qayınlıq (Tatar: Каенлык, romanized: Qayınlıq) is a rural locality (a selo) in Biektaw District, Tatarstan. The population was 377 as of 2010.

== Geography ==
Qayınlıq, Vysokogorsky District is located 18 km northwest of Biektaw, district's administrative centre, and 44 km north of Qazan, republic's capital, by road.

== History ==
The village was established in 1930s.

After the creation of districts in Tatar ASSR (Tatarstan) in Döbyaz (1930s–1963), Yäşel Üzän (1963–1965) and Biektaw districts.
