= Tatar Urmatı =

Tatar Urmatı Татар Урматы
- selo
- Location within Tatarstan
- Country: Russia
- Region: Tatarstan
- District: Biektaw District
- Time zone: UTC+3:00

Tatar Urmatı (Tatar: Татар Урматы, romanized: Tatar Urmatı) is a rural locality (a selo) in Biektaw District, Tatarstan. The population was 73 as of 2010.

== Geography ==
Tatar Urmatı is located 30 km northeast of Biektaw, district's administrative centre, and 50 km northeast of Qazan, republic's capital, by road.

== History ==
The village already existed during the period of the Qazan Khanate.

From 18th to the first half of the 19th centuries village's residents belonged to the social estate of state peasants.

By the beginning of the twentieth century, village had a mosque, a mekteb and 2 small shops.

Before the creation of the Tatar ASSR in 1920 was a part of Qazan Uyezd of Qazan Governorate. Since 1920 was a part of Arça Canton; after the creation of districts in Tatar ASSR (Tatarstan) in Arça (1930–1935), Biektaw (1935–1963), Piträç (1963–1965) and Biektaw districts.
