= Qazaqlar, Vysokogorsky District =

Qazaqlar Казаклар
- selo
- Location within Tatarstan
- Country: Russia
- Region: Tatarstan
- District: Biektaw District
- Time zone: UTC+3:00

Qazaqlar (Tatar: Казаклар, romanized: Qazaqlar) is a rural locality (a selo) in Biektaw District, Tatarstan. The population was 208 as of 2010.

== Geography ==
Qazaqlar is located 40 km northwest of Biektaw, district's administrative centre, and 67 km north of Qazan, republic's capital, by road.

== History ==
The earliest known record of the settlement dates from the 18th century.

From 18th to the first half of the 19th centuries village's residents belonged to the social estate of state peasants.

By the beginning of the twentieth century, village had a mosque, a blacksmith shop, a windmill and 4 small shops.

Before the creation of the Tatar ASSR in 1920 was a part of Çar Uyezd of Qazan Governorate. Since 1920 was a part of Arça Canton; after the creation of districts in Tatar ASSR (Tatarstan) in Döbyaz (1930–1963), Yäşel Üzän (1963–1965) and Biektaw districts.
