= Tatar Ayshase =

Tatar Ayshase Татар Әйшәсе
- selo
- Location within Tatarstan
- Country: Russia
- Region: Tatarstan
- District: Biektaw District
- Time zone: UTC+3:00

Tatar Ayshase (Tatar: Татар Әйшәсе, romanized: Tatar Äyşäse) is a rural locality (a selo) in Vysokogorsky District, Tatarstan. The population was 161 as of 2010.

== Geography ==
Tatar Ayshase is located 30 km northeast of Biektaw, district's administrative centre, and 51 km northeast of Kazan, republic's capital, by road.

== History ==
The village already existed during the period of the Khanate of Kazan.

From 18th to the first half of the 19th centuries village's residents belonged to the social estate of state peasants.

By the beginning of the twentieth century, village had a mosque, a mekteb, a watermill and 4 small shops.

Before the creation of the Tatar ASSR in 1920 was a part of Kazansky Uyezd of Kazan Governorate. Since 1920 was a part of Arça Canton; after the creation of districts in Tatar ASSR (Tatarstan) in Arsk Canton (1930–1935), Vysokogorsky (1935–1963), Arsky (1963–1965) and Vysokogorsky districts.
