= Biryuli =

Biryuli Бөреле
- Settlement
- Location within Tatarstan
- Coordinates: 55.971365°N 49.424229°E
- Country: Russia
- Region: Tatarstan
- District: Vysokogorsky District
- Time zone: UTC+3:00

Biryuli (Tatar: Бөреле, romanized: Börele; Russian: Бирюли) is a rural locality (a settlement) in Vysokogorsky District, Tatarstan, Russia. The population was 98 as of 2010.

== Geography ==
Biryuli is located 11 kilometres (6.8 mi) north of Vysokaya Gora, the district's administrative centre, and 32 kilometres (20 mi) northeast of Kazan, the republic's capital, by road.

== History ==
The village was established in 1930s.

After the creation of districts in the Tatar ASSR (Tatarstan), it was located in Vysokogorsky (1930s–1963), Zelenodolsky (1963–1965) and Vysokogorsky districts.
