= Yash Kech =

Yash Kech Яшь Көч
- Settlement
- Location within Tatarstan
- Coordinates: 55.956658°N 49.160933°E
- Country: Russia
- Region: Tatarstan
- District: Vysokogorsky District
- Time zone: UTC+3:00

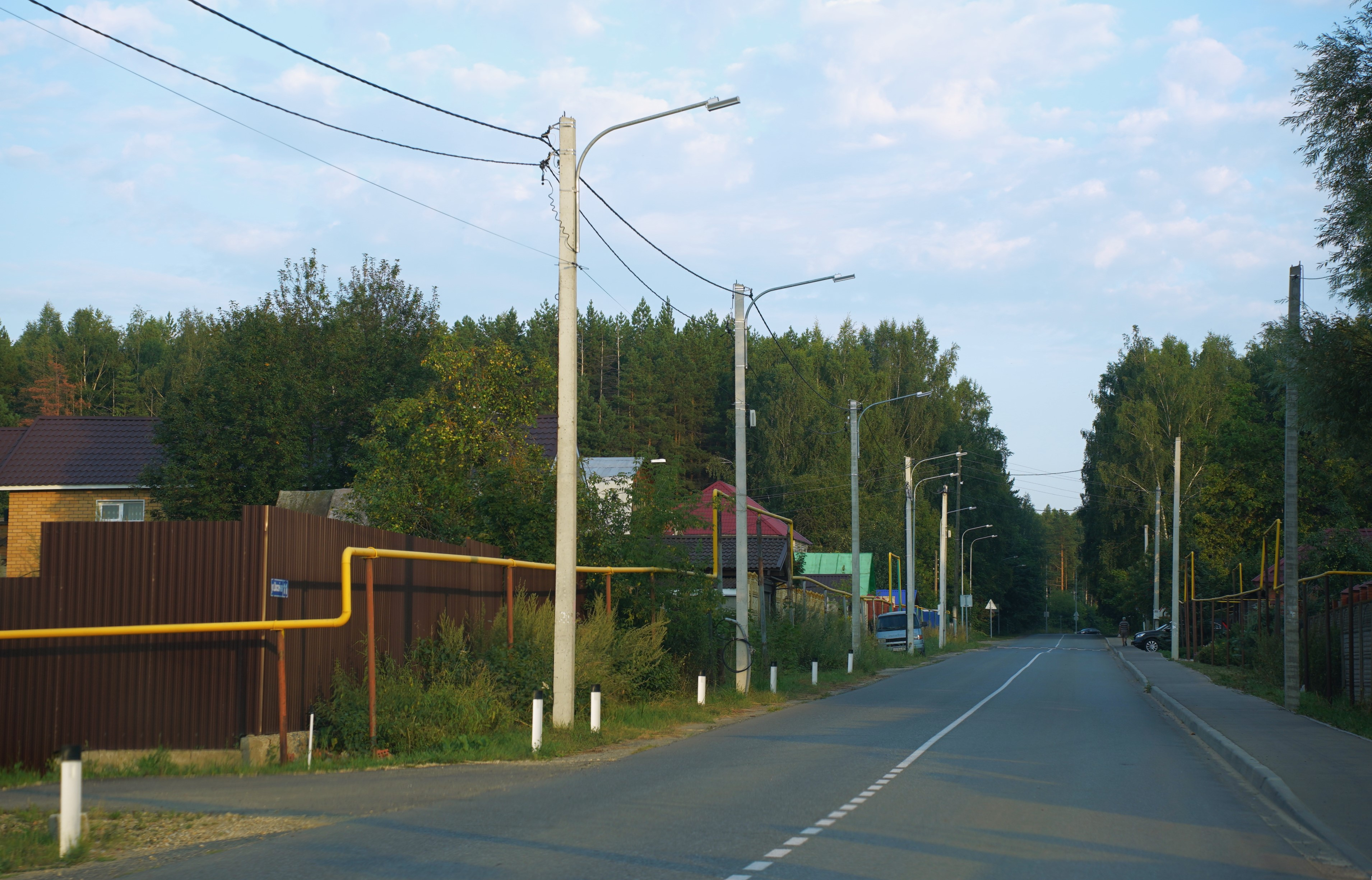
Highway in the village of Yas Kech

Yash Kech (Tatar: Яшь Көч, romanized: Yäş Köç; Russian: Яшь Кеч) is a rural locality (a settlement) in Vysokogorsky District, Tatarstan, Russia. The population was 31 as of 2010.

== Geography ==
Yash Kech is located 12 kilometres (7.5 mi) west of Vysokaya Gora, the district's administrative centre, and 33 kilometres (21 mi) north of Kazan, the republic's capital, by road.

== History ==
The village was established in 1920.

Since its establishment, it was part of Arsk Canton. After the creation of districts in the Tatar ASSR (Tatarstan), it was located in Kazansky (1930–1935), Vysokogorsky (1935–1963), Zelenodolsky (1963–1965) and Vysokogorsky districts.
