= Biektaw =

Biektaw Биектау
- selo
- Location within Tatarstan
- Country: Russia
- Region: Tatarstan
- District: Biektaw District
- Time zone: UTC+3:00

Vysokaya Gora, Tatarstan

Biektaw (Tatar: Биектау, romanized: Biyektaw) is a rural locality (a selo) in Biektaw District, Tatarstan. The population was 9589 as of 2010.

== Geography ==
Biektaw is located 1,5 km south of Biektaw, district's administrative centre, and 22 km northeast of Qazan, republic's capital, by road.

== History ==
The village already existed during the period of the Qazan Khanate.

From 18th to the first half of the 19th centuries village's residents belonged to the social estate of state peasants.

By the beginning of the twentieth century, village had a parish government, a staging camp, a church, a zemstvo school, a windmill, 8 blacksmith shops, a beer shop, a wine shop and 8 small shops.

Before the creation of the Tatar ASSR in 1920 was a part of Qazan Uyezd of Qazan Governorate. Since 1920 was a part of Arça Canton; after the creation of districts in Tatar ASSR (Tatarstan) in Biektaw (1930s–1963), Yäşel Üzän (1963–1965) and Biektaw districts.
