= Kinderle, Vysokogorsky District =

Kinderle Киндерле
- posyolok
- Location within Tatarstan
- Country: Russia
- Region: Tatarstan
- District: Biektaw District
- Time zone: UTC+3:00

Kinderle (Tatar: Киндерле, romanized: Kinderle) is a rural locality (a posyolok) in Biektaw District, Tatarstan. The population was 365 as of 2010.

== Geography ==
Kinderle is located 40 km southwest of Biektaw, district's administrative centre, and 21 km northeast of Qazan, republic's capital, by road.

== History ==
The village was established in 1930s.

Its establishment was a part of Yüdino District. After 1950 in Biektaw (1950–1963), Piträç (1963–1965) and Biektaw districts.
