= Qorqaçıq railway junction settlement =

Qorqaçıq railway junction settlement Коркачык тимер юл разъезы бистәсе
- posyolok
- Location within Tatarstan
- Country: Russia
- Region: Tatarstan
- District: Biektaw District
- Time zone: UTC+3:00

Qorqaçıq railway junction settlement (Tatar: Коркачык тимер юл разъезы бистәсе, romanized: Qorqaçıq timer yul razyızı bistäse) is a rural locality (a posyolok) in Biektaw District, Tatarstan. The population was 1850 as of 2010.

== Geography ==
Qorqaçıq railway junction settlement is located 17 km northeast of Biektaw, district's administrative centre, and 43 km northeast of Qazan, republic's capital, by road.

== History ==
The village was established in 1920s.

Since its establishment was a part of Arça Canton. After the creation of districts in Tatar ASSR (Tatarstan) in Arça (1930–1935), Biektaw (1935–1963), Piträç (1963–1965) and Biektaw districts.
