= Börele animal farm settlement =

Börele Бөреле җәнлек совхозы
- posyolok
- Location within Tatarstan
- Country: Russia
- Region: Tatarstan
- District: Biektaw District
- Time zone: UTC+3:00

Börele (Tatar: Бөреле җәнлек совхозы, romanized: Börele cänlek sofxozı) is a rural locality (a posyolok) in Biektaw District, Tatarstan. The population was 2241 as of 2010.

== Geography ==
Börele animal farm settlement is located 13 km northeast of Biektaw, district's administrative centre, and 33 km northeast of Qazan, republic's capital, by road.

== History ==
The village was established in 1930.

After the creation of districts in Tatar ASSR (Tatarstan) in Biektaw (1930s–1963), Yäşel Üzän (1963–1965) and Biektaw districts.
