= Kzyl-Kul =

Kzyl-Kul Кызылкүл
- Village
- Location within Tatarstan
- Coordinates: 55.972705°N 49.657090°E
- Country: Russia
- Region: Tatarstan
- District: Vysokogorsky District
- Time zone: UTC+3:00

Kzyl-Kul (Tatar: Кызылкүл, romanized: Qızılkül; Russian: Кзыл-Куль) is a rural locality (a village) in Vysokogorsky District, Tatarstan, Russia. The population was 24 as of 2010.

== Geography ==
Kzyl-Kul is located 30 kilometres (19 mi) west of Vysokaya Gora, the district's administrative centre, and 50 kilometres (31 mi) northeast of Kazan, the republic's capital, by road.

== History ==
The village was established in 1930s.

Following its establishment, it was part of Arsky District. After 1935, it was located in Vysokogorsky (1935–1963), Pestrechinsky (1963–1965) and Vysokogorsky districts.
