= Kurkachi =

Kurkachi Коркачык
- Selo
- Location within Tatarstan
- Coordinates: 56.001917°N 49.606308°E
- Country: Russia
- Region: Tatarstan
- District: Vysokogorsky District
- Time zone: UTC+3:00

Kurkachi (Tatar: Коркачык, romanized: Qorqaçıq; Russian: Куркачи) is a rural locality (a selo) in Vysokogorsky District, Tatarstan, Russia. The population was 770 as of 2010.

== Geography ==
Kurkachi is located 21 kilometres (13 mi) northeast of Vysokaya Gora, the district's administrative centre, and 43 kilometres (27 mi) northeast of Kazan, the republic's capital, by road.

== History ==
The village already existed during the period of the Kazan Khanate.

From 18th to the first half of the 19th centuries village's residents belonged to the social estate of state peasants.

From the 18th century to the first half of the 19th century, the village had a mosque, a mekteb, a watermill and three small shops.

Before the creation of the Tatar ASSR in 1920, it was part of Kazansky Uyezd of Kazan Governorate. From 1920, it was a part of Arsk Canton; after the creation of districts in the Tatar ASSR (Tatarstan), it was located in Arsky (1930–1935), Vysokogorsky (1935–1963), Pestrechinsky (1963–1965) and Vysokogorsky districts.
