= Tashsu =

Tashsu Ташсу
- Village
- Location within Tatarstan
- Coordinates: 56.079387°N 49.109756°E
- Country: Russia
- Region: Tatarstan
- District: Vysokogorsky District
- Time zone: UTC+3:00

Tashsu (Tatar: Ташсу, romanized: Taşsu; Russian: Ташсу) is a rural locality (a village) in Vysokogorsky District, Tatarstan, Russia. The population was 101 as of 2010. Tashsu is located 30 kilometres (19 mi) northwest of Vysokaya Gora, the district's administrative centre, and 57 kilometres (35 mi) north of Kazan, the republic's capital, by road.

The earliest known record of the settlement dates from the 17th century. Its name derived from words taş (stone) and su (water). It forms part of the district since 1965.

There are three streets in the village.

The village is the birthplace of Sadri Maqsudi, a politician, and his brother Äxmäthadi Maqsudi, a linguist and journalist.
