= Kazaklar =

Kazaklar may refer to:

- Kazaklar, Arsky District, Republic of Tatarstan, a village in Arsky District of the Republic of Tatarstan, Russia
- Kazaklar, Vysokogorsky District, Republic of Tatarstan, a village (selo) in Vysokogorsky District of the Republic of Tatarstan, Russia
