= School Card =

Russian education technology project

School Card is a Russian technology project focusing on the consolidation and upgrading of education technology infrastructure. The project originated in Tatarstan, Russia in 2011 as part of the "All Russia Competition of Projects of Regional and Municipal Informatization." School Card assists in the location tracking of students, the security of schools, and in parent/guardian supervision of education. The project was developed in partnership with the company Infomatika. As of 13 July, 2015, the project was implemented in 127 schools and educational institutions in Zelenodolsk, Naberezhyne Chelny, and Nizhnekamsk, with plans to expand to 102 additional school in Tatarstan.

== Functions ==
=== "School Map" ===
"School Map", one of the functions of School Card, is designed to allow for monitoring by parents/guardians of students. The program provides attendance monitoring, building access control, grade book viewing, library usage monitoring, and control over funds for public transportation and school meals.

=== "School Card" ===
"School card", as it is called as well for student functionality, comes either as a colorful bracelet with a microchip or as a contactless plastic card. These cards allow students access to the building and other functionalities.

=== "Privratnik" ===
Privratnik is the system within School Card which was designed for use by school administration. This system provides control over all visitors to the building and integrates with security cameras and sensors to assist with building security.
