= Yamashurma =

Selo in Tatarstan, Russia

Yamashurma Ямаширмә
- Selo
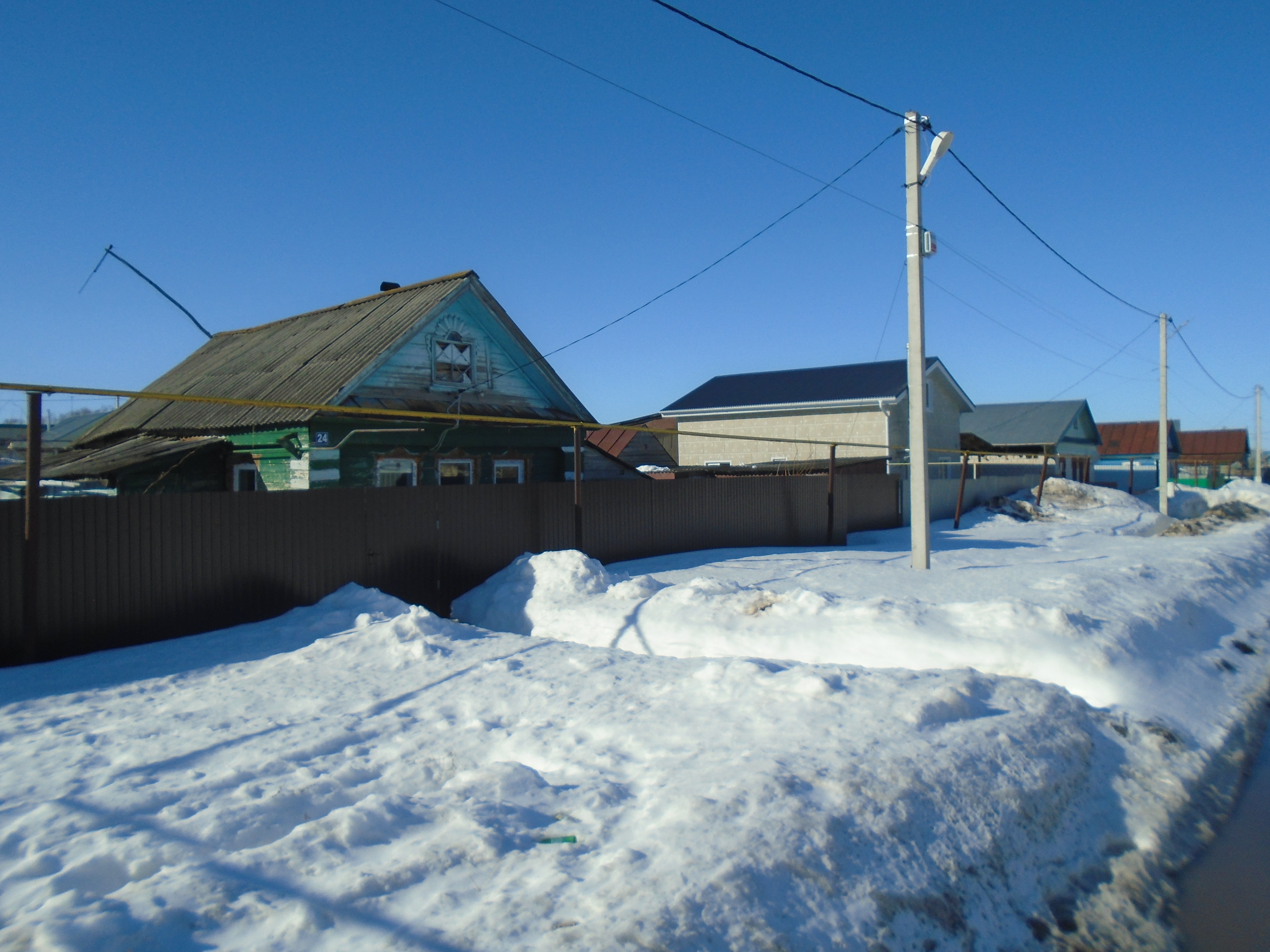
- houses in Yamashurma

- Location within Tatarstan
- Coordinates: 55.975098°N 49.599912°E
- Country: Russia
- Region: Tatarstan
- District: Vysokogorsky District
- Time zone: UTC+3:00

Yamashurma (Tatar: Ямаширмә; Russian: Ямашурма) is a rural locality (a selo) in Vysokogorsky District, Tatarstan, Russia. The population was 1,126 as of 2010.

Yamashurma is located 25 kilometres (16 mi) east of Vysokaya Gora, the district's administrative centre, and 46 kilometres (29 mi) northeast of Kazan, the republic's capital, by road.

The earliest known record of the settlement dates from the 16th century. It forms part of the district since 1965.

There are 22 streets in the village.
