= Chepchugi =

Chepchugi Чепчуги
- Selo
- Location within Tatarstan
- Coordinates: 56.001902°N 49.514869°E
- Country: Russia
- Region: Tatarstan
- District: Vysokogorsky District
- Time zone: UTC+3:00

Chepchugi (Tatar: Чыпчык, romanized: Çıpçıq; Russian: Чепчуги) is a rural locality (a selo) in Vysokogorsky District, Tatarstan, Russia. The population was 1,677 as of 2010.

Chepchugi is located 18 kilometres (11 mi) northeast of Vysokaya Gora, the district's administrative centre, and 32 kilometres (20 mi) northeast of Kazan, the republic's capital, by road.

The earliest known record of the settlement dates from the 16th century. It forms part of the district since 1965.

There are 11 streets in the village.
