= Olı Açasır =

Olı Açasır Олы Ачасыр
- selo
- Location within Tatarstan
- Country: Russia
- Region: Tatarstan
- District: Yäşel Üzän District
- Time zone: UTC+3:00

Olı Açasır (Tatar: Олы Ачасыр, romanized: Olı Açasır) is a rural locality (a selo) in Yäşel Üzän District, Tatarstan. The population was 694 as of 2010. Olı Açasır is located 25 km from Yäşel Üzän, district's administrative centre, and 69 km from Qazan, republic's capital, by road. The village already existed during the period of the Qazan Khanate. There are 9 streets in the village.
