= Usad, Vysokogorsky District =

Usad Усад
- selo
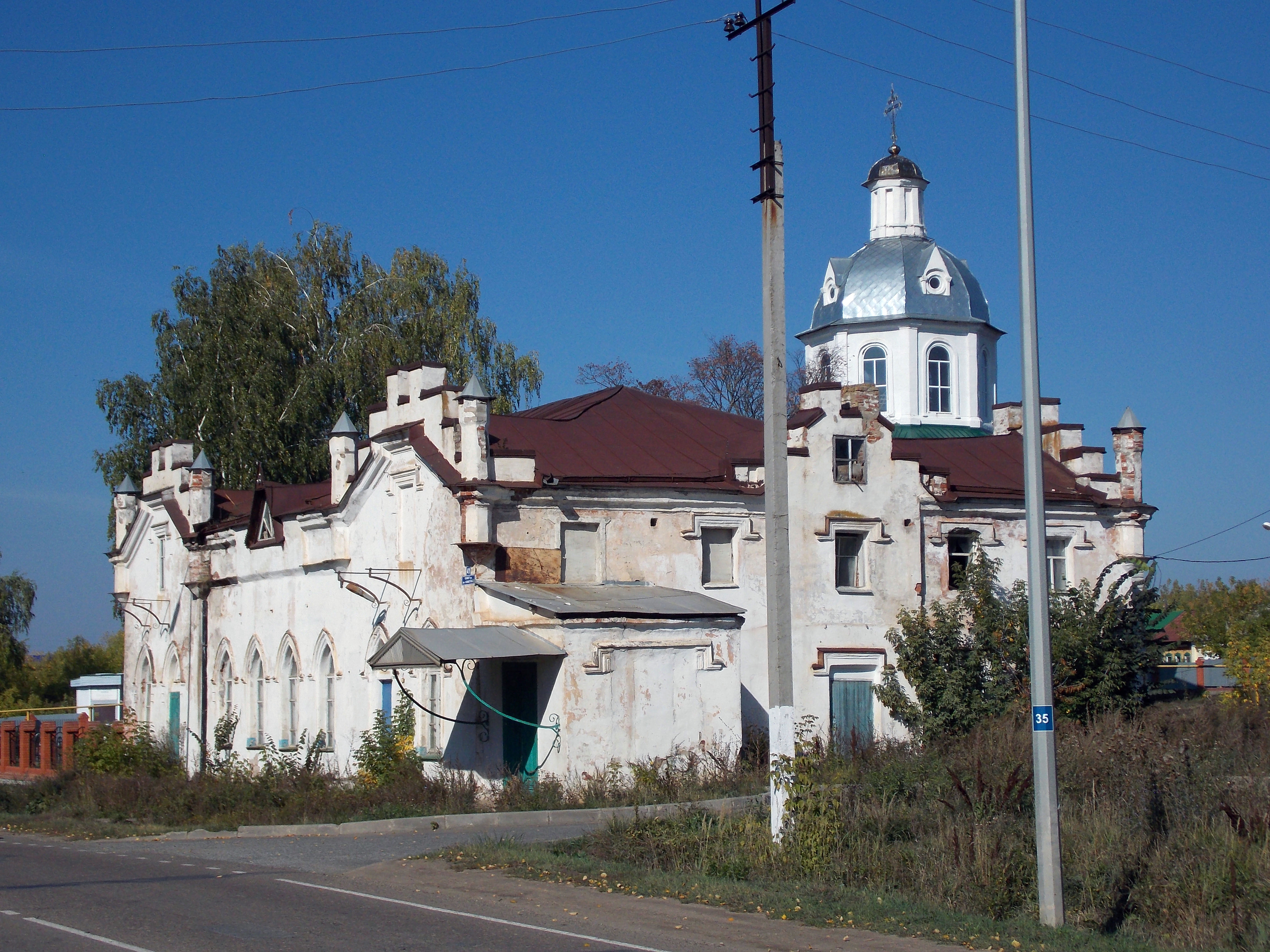
- Zhuravlev's estate: Usady, Vysokogorsky district, Tatarstan

- Location within Tatarstan
- Country: Russia
- Region: Tatarstan
- District: Biektaw District
- Time zone: UTC+3:00

Usad (Tatar: Усад, romanized: Usad) is a rural locality (a selo) in Biektaw District, Tatarstan. The population was 1095 as of 2010.

Usad is located 12 km north of Biektaw, district's administrative centre, and 33 km north of Qazan, republic's capital, by road.

The earliest known record of the settlement dates from 1677. It forms part of the district since 1965.

There are 26 streets in the village.
