= Shapshi =

Shapshi Шәпше
- Selo
- Location within Tatarstan
- Coordinates: 55.953326°N 49.495052°E
- Country: Russia
- Region: Tatarstan
- District: Vysokogorsky District
- Time zone: UTC+3:00

Shapshi (Tatar: Шәпше, romanized: Şäpşe; Russian: Шапши) is a rural locality (a selo) in Vysokogorsky District, Tatarstan, Russia. The population was 1,268 as of 2010.

Shapshi is located 14 kilometres (8.7 mi) east of Vysokaya Gora, the district's administrative centre, and 40 kilometres (25 mi) northeast of Kazan, the republic's capital, by road.

The village already existed during the period of the Kazan Khanate. It forms part of the district since 1965.

There are 40 streets in the village.
