= Baqırçı, Zelenodolsky District =

Baqırçı Бакырчы
- selo
- Location within Tatarstan
- Country: Russia
- Region: Tatarstan
- District: Yäşel Üzän District
- Time zone: UTC+3:00

Baqırçı (Tatar: Бакырчы, romanized: Baqırçı) is a rural locality (a selo) in Yäşel Üzän District, Tatarstan. The population was 380 as of 2010. Baqırçı, Zelenodolsky District is located 48 km from Yäşel Üzän, district's administrative centre, and 91 km from Qazan, republic's capital, by road. The village already existed during the period of the Qazan Khanate. There are 8 streets in the village.
