= Tashly-Kovali =

Tashly-Kovali Ташлы Кавал
- Selo
- Location within Tatarstan
- Coordinates: 56.067630°N 49.472684°E
- Country: Russia
- Region: Tatarstan
- District: Vysokogorsky District
- Time zone: UTC+3:00

Tashly-Kovali (Tatar: Ташлы Кавал, romanized: Taşlı Qawal; Russian: Ташлы-Ковали) is a rural locality (a selo) in Vysokogorsky District, Tatarstan, Russia. The population was 268 as of 2010. Tashly-Kovali is located 23 kilometres (14 mi) northeast of Vysokaya Gora, the district's administrative centre, and 54 kilometres (34 mi) north of Kazan, the republic's capital, by road.

The earliest known record of the settlement dates from the 17th century. It forms part of the district since 1965.

There are seven streets in the village.
