= Bişnä =

Bişnä Бишнә
- selo
- Location within Tatarstan
- Country: Russia
- Region: Tatarstan
- District: Yäşel Üzän District
- Time zone: UTC+3:00

Bişnä (Tatar: Бишнә, romanized: Bişnä) is a rural locality (a selo) in Yäşel Üzän District, Tatarstan. The population was 643 as of 2010. Bişnä is located 38 km from Yäşel Üzän, district's administrative centre, and 36 km from Qazan, republic's capital, by road. The village already existed during the period of the Qazan Khanate. There are 12 streets in the village.
