= Kügeş =

Kügeş Күгеш
- selo
- Location within Tatarstan
- Country: Russia
- Region: Tatarstan
- District: Yäşel Üzän District
- Time zone: UTC+3:00

Kügeş (Tatar: Күгеш, romanized: Kügeş) is a rural locality (a selo) in Yäşel Üzän District, Tatarstan. The population was 409 as of 2010. Kügeş is located 46 km from Yäşеl Üzän, district's administrative centre, and 91 km from Ԛаzan, republic's capital, by road. The village already existed during the period of the Qazan Khanate. There are 11 streets in the village.
