= Olı Şırdan =

Olı Şırdan Олы Шырдан
- selo
- Location within Tatarstan
- Country: Russia
- Region: Tatarstan
- District: Yäşel Üzän District
- Time zone: UTC+3:00

Olı Şırdan (Tatar: Олы Шырдан, romanized: Olı Şırdan) is a rural locality (a selo) in Yäşel Üzän District, Tatarstan. The population was 346 as of 2010. Olı Şırdan is located 14 km from Yäşel Üzän, district's administrative centre, and 64 km from Qazan, republic's capital, by road. The village already existed during the period of the Qazan Khanate. There are 7 streets in the village.
