= Olı Qarağuca =

Olı Qarağuca Олы Карагуҗа
- selo
- Location within Tatarstan
- Country: Russia
- Region: Tatarstan
- District: Yäşel Üzän District
- Time zone: UTC+3:00

Olı Qarağuca (Tatar: Олы Карагуҗа, romanized: Olı Qarağuca) is a rural locality (a selo) in Yäşel Üzän District, Tatarstan. The population was 656 as of 2010. Olı Qarağuca is located 31 km from Yäşel Üzän, district's administrative centre, and 43 km from Qazan, republic's capital, by road. The village already existed during the period of the Qazan Khanate. There are 8 streets in the village.
