= Suıqsu, Vysokogorsky District =

Suıqsu Суыксу
- selo
- Location within Tatarstan
- Country: Russia
- Region: Tatarstan
- District: Biektaw District
- Time zone: UTC+3:00

Suıqsu (Tatar: Суыксу, romanized: Suıqsu) is a rural locality (a selo) in Biektaw District, Tatarstan. The population was 289 as of 2010. Suıqsu, Vysokogorsky District is located 30 km northwest of Biektaw, district's administrative centre, and 53 km north of Qazan, republic's capital, by road.

The earliest known record of the settlement dates from the 17th century.It forms part of the district since 1965.

There are 6 streets in the village.
