= Dubyazsky District =

Former district of the Tatar ASSR

Dubyazsky District (Russian: Дубъязский район; Tatar: Дөбъяз районы) was a district (raion) of the Tatar ASSR.

It had an area of about 900 square kilometers in 1947 and a population of 25,563 in 1959.

It was established on February 10, 1930. Its administrative center was the village (selo) of Dubyazy. On January 4, 1963, the district was abolished and its territory was transferred to Zelenodolsky and Vysokogorsky Districts.
