= Kazansky Uyezd =

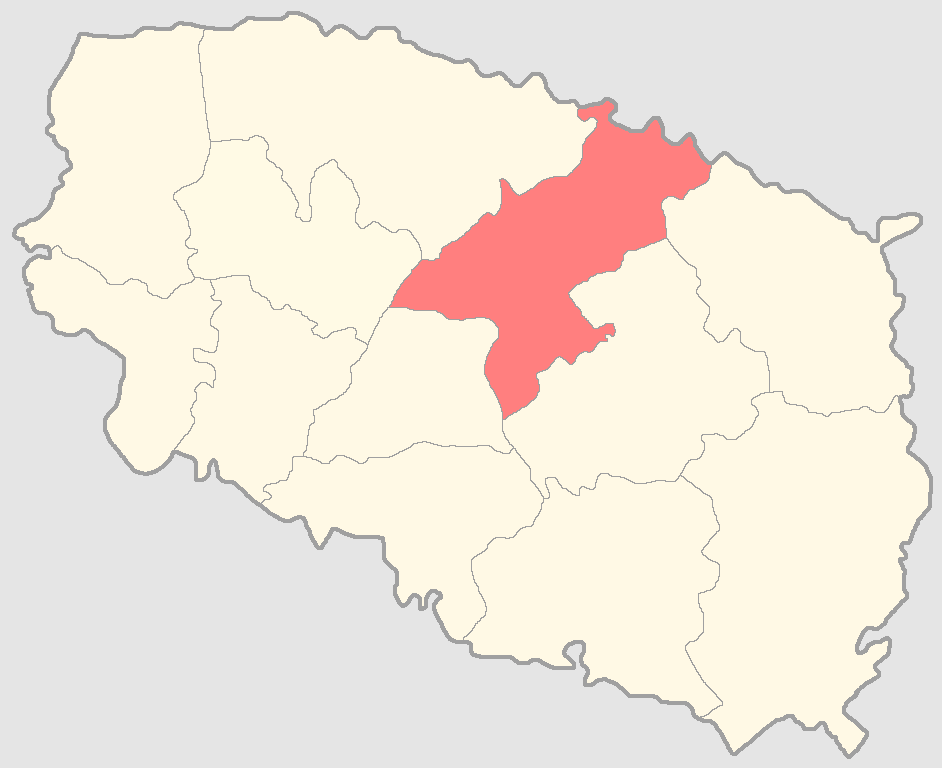

Kazansky Uyezd (Каза́нский уе́зд) was one of the subdivisions of the Kazan Governorate of the Russian Empire. It was situated in the northern part of the governorate. Its administrative centre was Kazan.

== Demographics ==
At the time of the Russian Empire Census of 1897, Kazansky Uyezd had a population of 350,719. Of these, 54.5% spoke Russian, 41.8% Tatar, 1.6% Mari, 0.4% Polish, 0.4% Udmurt, 0.4% Yiddish, 0.3% German, 0.2% Ukrainian and 0.2% Chuvash as their native language.
