= Vysokogorsky District =

Vysokogorsky District Высокогорский район (Russian)
- District

Other transcription(s)
  - Tatar: Биектау районы
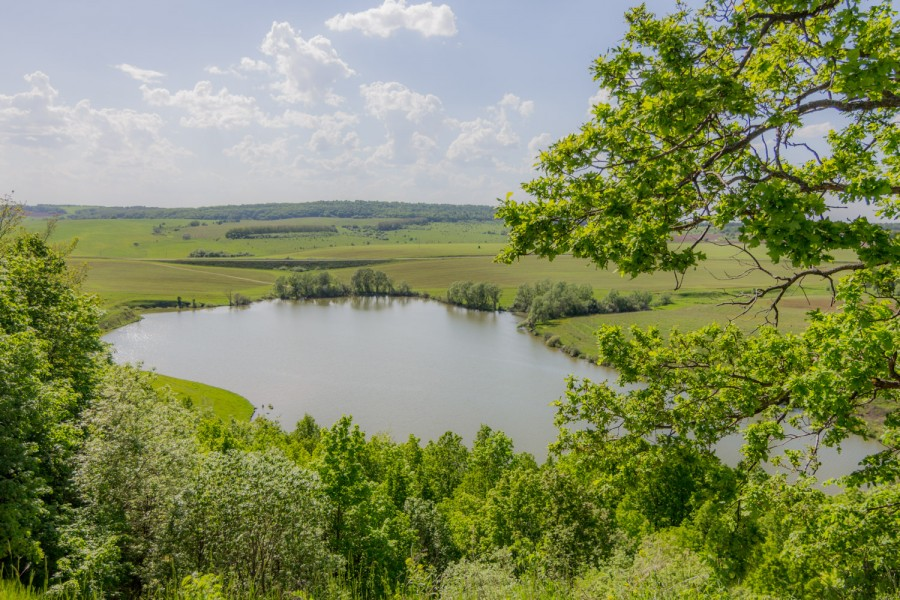
- Lake Kara-Kul, Vysokogorsky District

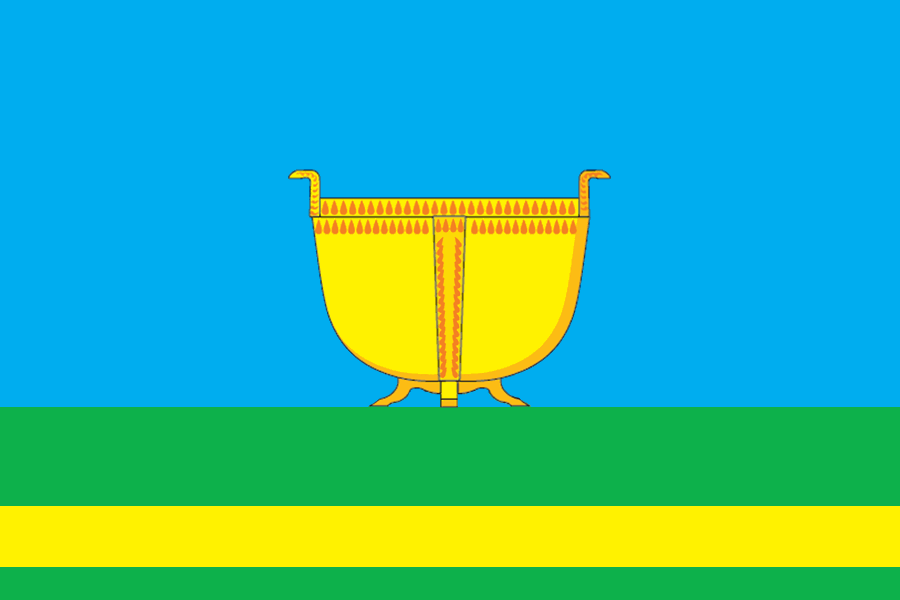
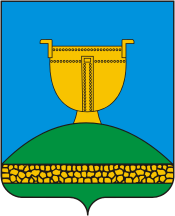
- Flag Coat of arms
- Location of Vysokogorsky District in the Republic of Tatarstan
- Coordinates: 56°01′N 49°20′E
- Country: Russia
- Federal subject: Republic of Tatarstan
- Established: 10 February 1935
- Administrative center: zheleznodorozhnoy stantsii Vysokaya Gora

Area
  - Total: 1,701.2 km^{2} (656.8 sq mi)

Population (2010 Census)
  - Total: 43,207
  - Density: 25.398/km^{2} (65.780/sq mi)
  - Urban: 0%
  - Rural: 100%

Administrative structure
  - Inhabited localities: 124 rural localities

Municipal structure
  - Municipally incorporated as: Vysokogorsky Municipal District
  - Municipal divisions: 0 urban settlements, 24 rural settlements
- Time zone: UTC+3 (MSK)
- OKTMO ID: 92622000
- Website: http://vysokaya-gora.tatarstan.ru/

Vysokogorsky District (Russian: Высокого́рский райо́н; Tatar: Биектау районы) is a territorial administrative unit and municipal district of the Republic of Tatarstan within the Russian Federation. The administrative center of the district is the village of Vysokaya Gora. The district population at the beginning of 2020 was 51,567.

The first settlements on the territory of the modern Vysokogorsky district date back to the 12th century and were initially subjects of Volga Bulgaria. The remains of some of these settlements survive to the present day and are sites of cultural heritage in the Republic.

Industrial and agricultural complexes are well developed in the district with three industrial sites having already been created. Another industrial park is planned to be put into operation in 2021.

== Geography and climate ==
The Vysokogorsky district is located in the northwestern part of the Republic of Tatarstan. The district shares borders with the Zelenodolsky, Arsky, Atninsky and Pestrechinsky districts, as well as the Republic of Mari El. The administrative center of the region is the village of Vysokaya Gora. The territory of the district encompasses an area of 1,574.8 km^{2} (608.0 sq mi) with 1,188.2 km^{2} (458.8 sq mi) devoted to agricultural use. Vysokogorsky district is a structural unit of the Kazan metropolitan area and there are 25 rural settlements in the district. The district climate is continental with average temperatures in July from 18.5 to 19.5 °C (65.3 to 67.1 °F) and January temperatures ranging from −14.5 to −13.5 °C (5.9 to 7.7 °F).

== Coat of arms and flag ==
The modern coat of arms of the Vysokogorsky district was approved by the decision of the Council of the municipal district on December 6, 2006. The visual design of the coat of arms includes an azure color as a symbol of the clear sky. A golden cauldron symbolizes the region's rich history and local traditions. The cauldron is located on a green hill, which reflects the name of the area. The flag of the Vysokogorsky district has blue, green, yellow colors. The flag is based on heraldic elements of the coat of arms.

== History ==
=== Background ===
The village of Iske-Kazan was founded on the territory of the modern Vysokogorsky district in the 12th century. But later in the 15th century, it became a part of the Kazan Khanate. The modern village of Vysokaya Gora was called Baigysh at that time. After the seizure of the territory by Ivan the Terrible, it was renamed Rozhdestvenskoye.

Part of the territory of the district belonged to the Alatskaya Daruga (district) until the beginning of the 18th century. The road to the administrative center of Alatskaya Daruga passed to the north and northwest of Kazan. The district at this time was inhabited by Russian landowners, Tatars, and newly baptized peoples. Alatskaya Daruga was abolished in 1708, and its territory became part of the Kazan district. In 1722, Peter I visited the village of Kaymary and the construction of the temple of St. Kyril Belozersky began after his visit. Subsequently, a close friend of Peter I, Nefyod Kudryavtsev, received an estate in the village, leading to frequent visits by both the emperor himself and his successors: Paul I and Catherine the Great to the Kaymar estate in the district{. Besides them, Yevgeny Baratynsky had lived in the district since 1831.

The Vysokohorsky district was formed as a new territorial unit in 1935 after the dissolution of the cantons. It was abolished in 1959, but it was restored 4 years later in.

=== Contemporary Vysokogosrky District ===
Rashid Shayakhmetov was appointed as head of the Vysokogorsky district in 1998. He was replaced by Nagim Sadiev in 2007 who then subsequently resigned in 2010. To the present day the district has been headed by Rustam Kalimullin, who previously headed the Mamadyshsky District. The current head of the district executive committee is Damir Shaydullin.

== Population ==
51,567 people lived in the Vysokogorsky district at the beginning of 2020. By ethnic composition, the population is divided as follows with 64% identifying as Tatars, 34% as Russians, and 2% as belonging to other nationalities.

Historical population
Year	Pop.	±%
1939	29,690	—
1959	48,740	+64.2%
1970	63,814	+30.9%
1979	63,925	+0.2%
1989	52,109	−18.5%
2002	46,323	−11.1%
2010	43,207	−6.7%
2021	56,047	+29.7%
Source: Census data

== Municipal-territorial structure ==
There are 25 rural settlements in the Vysokogorsky municipal district. The administrative centers of rural settlements are the villages Aybash, Alan-Bekser, Aldermysh, Berozka, Biryulinskogo Zverosovkhoza, Bolshoy Bitaman, Bolshiye Kovali, Vysokaya Gora, Dachnoye, Dubyazy, Kurkachi, Kazaklar, Memdel, Mulma, Alat, Semiozerka, Suksu, Tashly-Kovali, Usady, Chepchugi, Chernyshevka, Shapshi, and Yamashurma.

== Economy ==
=== Industry ===
The largest enterprises in the district are the companies "Wienerberger Brick", "Safplast" and "Tatspirtprom" which in 2015 produced products worth 7.81 billion rubles.

The "Kazanselmash" agricultural machinery plant began operating in the Vysokogorsky region in 2007 on the site of a former dairy plant. The company managed to acquire its own headquarters in the village of Kurkachi in 2007. According to data from 2016, the plant's revenue amounted to more than 50 million rubles. The average salary of the company's employees was 52.3 thousand rubles in 2020.

The largest regional plant "SafPlast" began operating in 2008. Already in 2010, the company's turnover amounted to 1.53 billion rubles. "SafPlast" was included in the ranking Top 300 Companies of Tatarstan in 2011. The company ranked first in Russia in the production of extrusion extruded polymer sheets in 2018, annually producing 15 billion square meters of these products. The plant has been a member of the national project "Labor productivity and employment support" since 2019 from which its employees receive soft loans, courses for retraining and advanced training are organized for them.

A branch of the Austrian manufacturer of ceramic materials "Wienerberger" has operated in the village of Kurkachi, since 2008. Production has been expanded since then with about 100 million rubles were invested in new production facilities in 2014. The company's revenue amounted to 578.2 million rubles in 2018.

In January–September 2020 gross regional exports accounted for over 9.7 billion rubles in economic activity in the region.

=== Agriculture ===
The Vysokogorsky district ranked third in the Kazan agglomeration and 19th in Tatarstan in terms of agricultural production in 2015. Spring wheat, winter rye, oats, vegetables are cultivated in the region. The main livestock industries in the region are dairy and beef cattle breeding. Prominent agricultural enterprises in the district are "Biryuli", "Serp and Molot", "Pravda", "Bitaman", "Suksu", "Vatan", and the agrofirm "Tatarstan".

The agricultural enterprise "Biryuli" was founded in the 1930s. The company has been engaged in crop production, fur farming, garment making and the sale of fur products since the 2000s. "Biryuli" purchased out about 100 hectares of land in the region to expand production in 2010. The company owed its employees about 5.4 million from the salary fund by 2016. The company paid off the debt after the intervention of the republican interagency commission. The company's assets include 22 thousand hectares of agricultural land, including 17 thousand hectares of arable land and 3.6 thousand head of cattle in 2017.

A rabbit factory was founded in the village of Ulya in 2006. 90% of the shares of the factory belonged to the Investment and Venture Fund of Tatarstan as the main investor, which allocated 37 million rubles for the creation of the enterprise. A year later, the head of the farm was arrested on suspicion of embezzlement of part of the allocated funds. Under new leadership the firm has since repeatedly been included in the rating of the "100 best goods of Russia" and joined the ranks of the country's largest rabbit meat factories. At the time the company had invested about 560 million rubles, while its revenue only amounted to about 122 million. The company was declared bankrupt in 2018 with its property and debts estimated at 227 million rubles.

The Vysokogorsky District has been operating the "Support for Beginning Farmers" program since 2012. 12 projects were implemented under its auspices for the cost of 17 million rubles over the four years of its operation. The program for the construction of cowsheds was initiated in the region and a new dairy farm for 390 cows was opened in the Vysokogorsky district in 2020.

There is a branch of the Kasymov Dairy Plant in the region. It specializes in short-term storage products sold under the "Berekatle" brand. The Vysokogorsky plant was bought by the Udmurt company "Uva-Moloko" for 750 million rubles in 2020. Investors explained the acquisition by the fact that there is little milk in Udmurtia and the region relies on orders from Tatarstan. The new owners plan to invest about 100 million rubles in the plant to increase its milk processing capacity from 70 to 250 tons per day. The brand under which the products are manufactured will remain unchanged.

=== Investment potential ===
There are three industrial sites in the district. They had 17 residents who produced products worth 6.2 billion rubles in 2015. The Direct Investment Fund of Tatarstan announced its intention to create a food industrial park "M7 Vysokaya Gora" in the Vysokogorsky district in 2017. The park is intended to launch meat processing and food production capacity in the district. Up to 70 site residents could be accommodated on the site with the stated potential to create 6-7 thousand new jobs in 2020. Completion of the site infrastructure and the attraction of residents is planned for early 2021. According to the project, the total amount of investment by residents and management companies by 2026 is said to amount to25 million rubles.

Indicators of investment in enterprises of the district, excluding budgetary funds, amounted to 8,339,000 rubles in 2019 and 4,608,000 rubles in the first half of 2020.

=== Transport ===
The federal main railway line "Kazan - Yekaterinburg" passes through the territory of the Vysokogorsky district. The main roads serving the district are the "M-7 Volga" federal highway and the "Kazan - Malmyzh" road with a continuation to the city of Kirov. The total length of local public roads is 678.7 km (421.7 mi).

== Environment ==
The state natural landscape park "Chulpan" is located on the territory of the district. It is located near the village of Bolshiye Kovali and covers 6054 hectares. The park provides a habitat for nine of the endangered bird species listed in the Red Book of the Republic of Tatarstan. In addition, there are seven natural monuments in the region, among them five lakes, the Estachinsky slope, and the "Semiozerny forest". The Republic authorities have developed a project to group these lakes into a tourist cluster named the "Mirrors of Tatarstan". This concept became a finalist of the All-Russian competition for the development of ecotourism in Russia. The project involves the creation of a center for environmental education and active recreation, the promotion of sports recreation. Work is scheduled to start on this project in the spring of 2021.

== Social welfare and public life ==
According to data from 2019, the Vysokogorsky district is served by 88 educational institutions, 26 rural clubs, 43 libraries, three children's music schools, and 117 cultural and educational institutions. There are two racing tracks, ski resorts, and a sports complex with clubs of wrestling, judo, aerobics, and athletic gymnastics in the village of Vysokaya Gora. In 2020, a swimming pool with an area of 1498.4 m2 was opened in the village of Vysokaya Gora.

There are nine cultural heritage sitesin the area. Among them is the Church of the Icon of the Kazan Mother of God. Its original building was erected back in the 17th century. The existing temple was built in 1809. In Soviet times, the premises of the church were used for raising chickens and pigs. The temple took a long time to restore. In 2020, the first prayer service was held in the building for the first time in a long time.
