= Zelenodolsky District =

Zelenodolsky District Зеленодольский район (Russian)
- District

Other transcription(s)
  - Tatar: Яшел Үзән районы
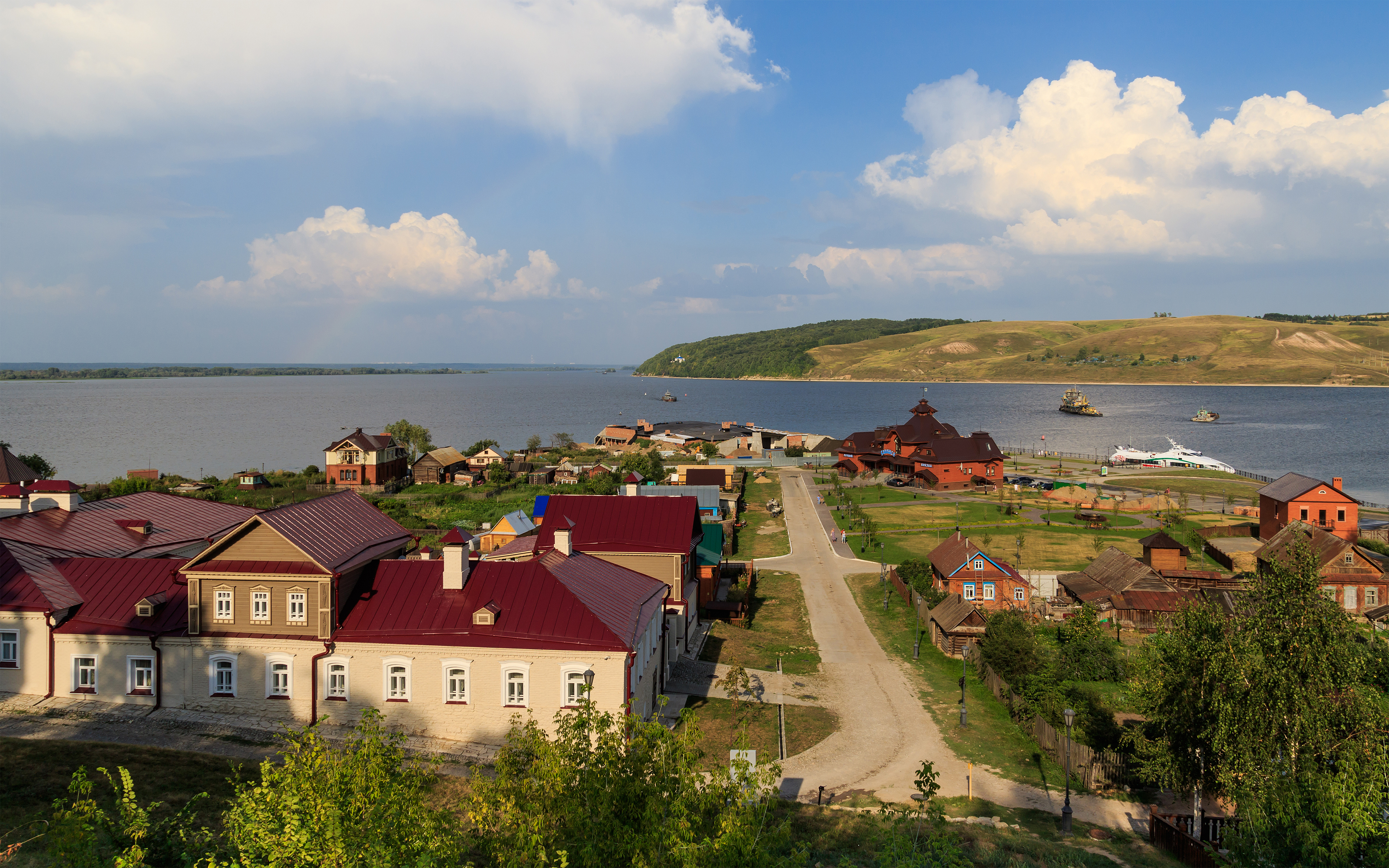
- The selo of Sviyazhsk in Zelenodolsky District

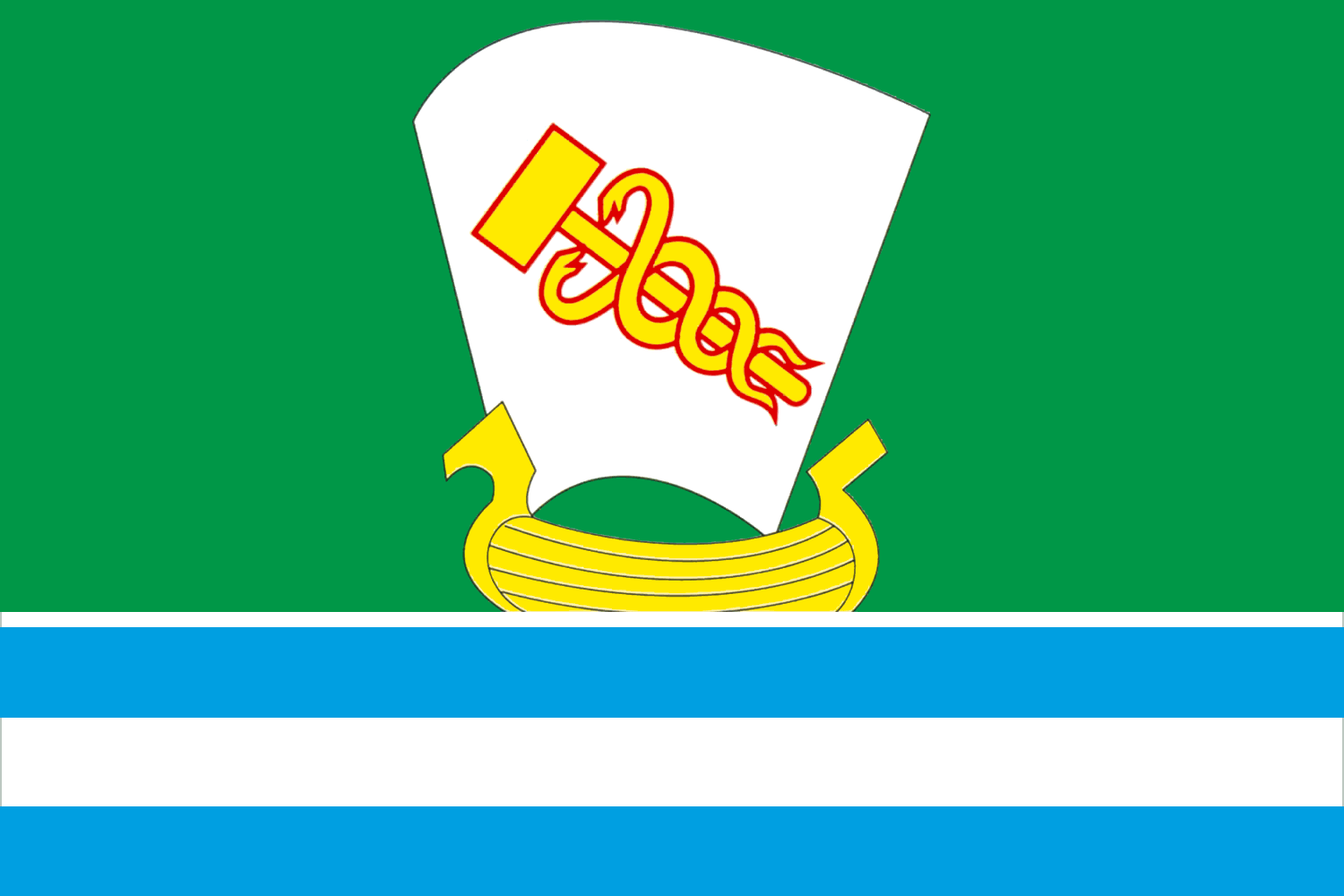
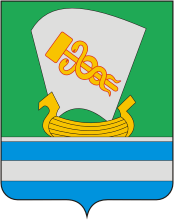
- Flag Coat of arms
- Location of Zelenodolsky District in the Republic of Tatarstan
- Coordinates: 55°51′N 48°36′E
- Country: Russia
- Federal subject: Tatarstan
- Established: 4 August 1938
- Administrative center: Zelenodolsk

Area
  - Total: 1,396 km^{2} (539 sq mi)

Population (2010 Census)
  - Total: 60,878
  - Density: 43.61/km^{2} (112.9/sq mi)
  - Urban: 41.1%
  - Rural: 58.9%

Administrative structure
  - Inhabited localities: 2 urban-type settlements, 103 rural localities

Municipal structure
  - Municipally incorporated as: Zelenodolsky Municipal District
  - Municipal divisions: 3 urban settlements, 21 rural settlements
- Time zone: UTC+3 (MSK)
- OKTMO ID: 92628000
- Website: http://zelenodolsk.tatarstan.ru/

Zelenodolsky District (Russian: Зеленодо́льский райо́н; Tatar: Яшел Үзән районы) — is a territorial administrative unit and municipal district of the Republic of Tatarstan within the Russian Federation. The district is divided by a channel of the Volga river into sections on the right-bank and left-bank. The administrative center of the district is Zelenodolsk. At the beginning of 2020, the population of the district was 165,915.

Initially Zelenodolsk was intended to be a working-type settlement for the repair of shipping transport. In 1932 it received status as a city and the Zelenodolsk Shipyard was designated as a city-forming enterprise. One of the main tourist attractions in Tatarstan is the island city of Sviyazhsk which is located in the Zelenodolsky district.

== Geography ==
Zelenodolsky is the only region of the republic which is located on both banks of the Volga River. It borders in the west with the Chuvashia (Kozlovsky and Urmarsky districts), in the north with the Mari El Republic (Volzhsky district and the Volzhsk urban district), in the northeast with the Vysokogorsky District of Tatarstan, in the southeast with Verkhneuslonsky District, in the south with Kaybitsky District and in the east with Kazan. The mouth of the Sviyaga river (right tributary of the Volga river) and the Sumka river (left tributary of the Volga river) are in the district which has a land area of 1396 km^{2}. The administrative center of the district is Zelenodolsk, the fifth most populous city in Tatarstan.

== Coat of arms and flag ==
The Council of Zelenodolsk Municipal District of the Republic of Tatarstan approved the modern coat of arms and flag of the district on December 15, 2006. A boat is located in the center of the green background, symbolizing shipbuilding which is the main branch of the region's economy. A hammer is depicted on the sail of the boat as the symbol of one of the leading industrial enterprises of the region - the "Zavod imeni Sergo". The hammer is entwined with snakes, which is a symbol of successful trade. Green symbolizes nature, health, and ecology. Azure color symbolizes the Volga, and the silver belt means the Moscow-Kazan highway, which passes through Zelenodolsk. Also, the silver color is a symbol of purity, perfection, peace and well-being. The flag repeats the symbols and colors of the coat of arms.

== History ==
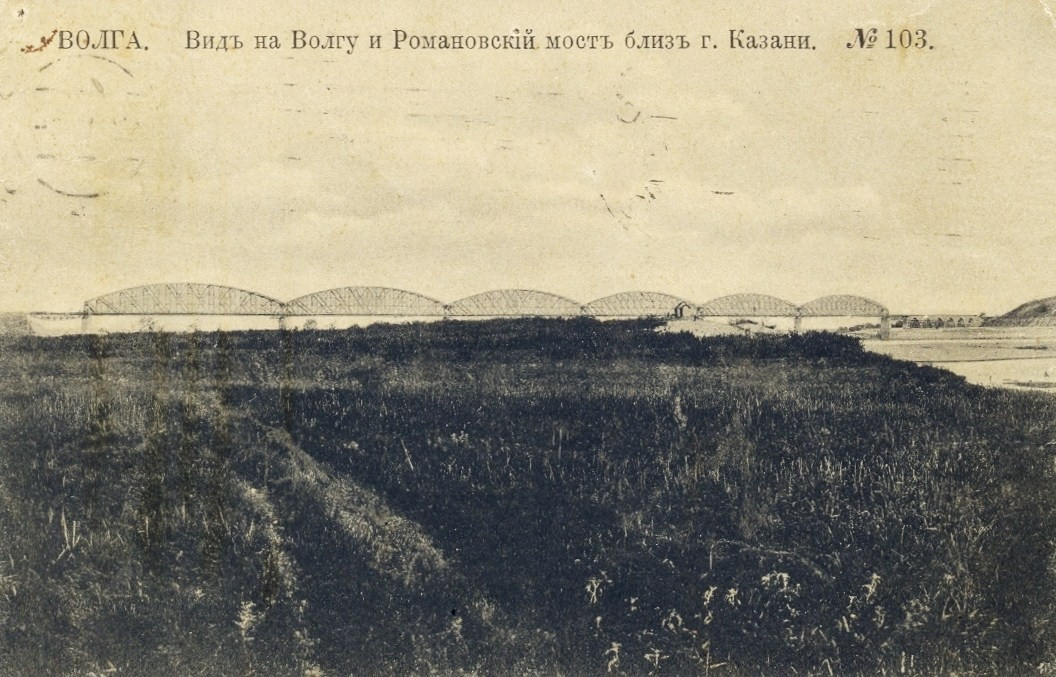
Romanovsky bridge across the Volga in 1910

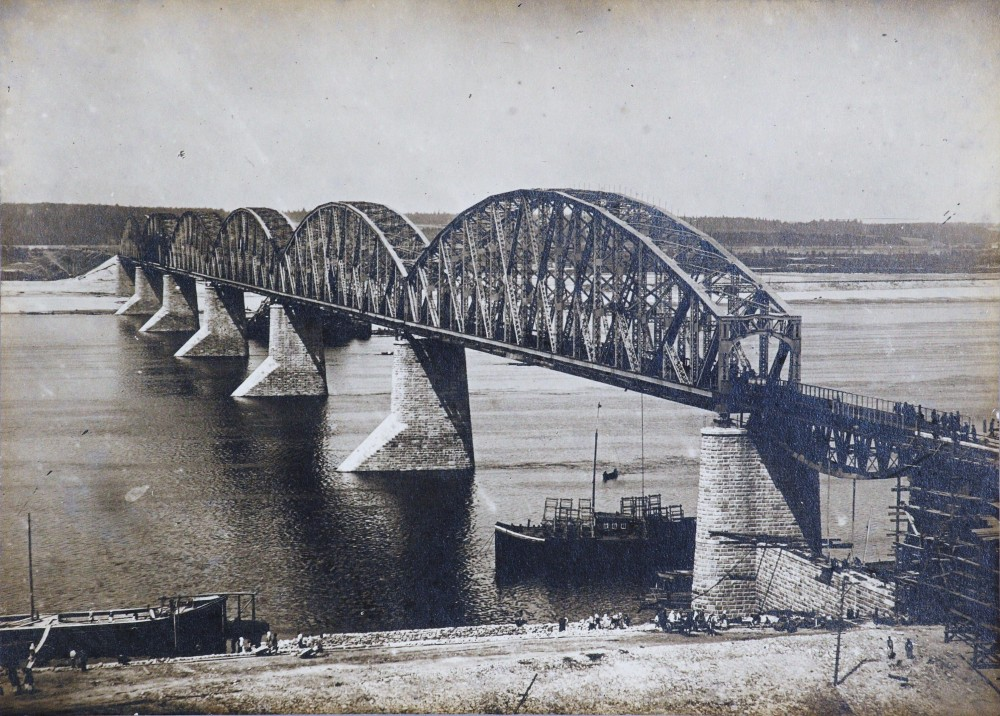
Romanovsky bridge across the Volga in 1913

=== Origins ===
The village of Kabashchich was formed in 1865 on the site now occupied by modern Zelenodolsk. By 1890, 104 people lived in the village and sawmills began to operate nearby it. In 1897, the village was renamed as Paratsk or Paratsky Zaton, by which time it had become a place for repair and wintering of river ships sailing along the Volga. The backwaters of the shipyards would serve as the basis for the future factory named after Maxim Gorky. In 1928, Paratsk was reorganized into the working village of Zeleny Dol. On July 11, 1913, a railway bridge across the Volga was opened near the village, and a stations along this line was established in the village. In 1932, according to the Resolution of the All-Russian Central Executive Committee, Zeleny Dol received the status of a city and the name Zelenodolsk. In the period 1931-1932 three factories were built in the city and the area of housing increased by 24,000 m^{2}. Zelenodolsk was part of the Yudinsky region (Tat. Юдино районы) that was formed on August 4, 1938 from the western part of the abolished Kazan region. The administrative center of the district was located in the working village of Yudino (now part of Kazan).

On January 1, 1948, the district included three village councils: Vasilievsky, Oktyabrsky and Yudinsky, and 24 village councils: Aishinsky, Belo-Bezvodninsky, Bishninsky, Bolshe-Derbyshkinsky, Bolshe-Klyuchinsky, Bolshe-Kulbashsky, Bolshe-Kurguzinsky, Bolshe- Yakinsky, Borisoglebsky, Garinsky, Kadyshevsky, Kindersky, Krasnogorsky, Malo-Klyuchinsky, Nikolsky, Novopolsky, Osinovsky, Osoko-Kovalinsky, Remplersky, Russian-Mari-Kovalinsky, Semiozersky, Sukhoretsky, Urazlinsky and Shigalinsky. The territory of the Yudinsky district encompassed 906 km^{2} during this period. On July 16, 1958, the district center was moved from the village of Yudino to Zelenodolsk and the district was renamed after Zelenodolsky.

=== Sviyazhsk ===
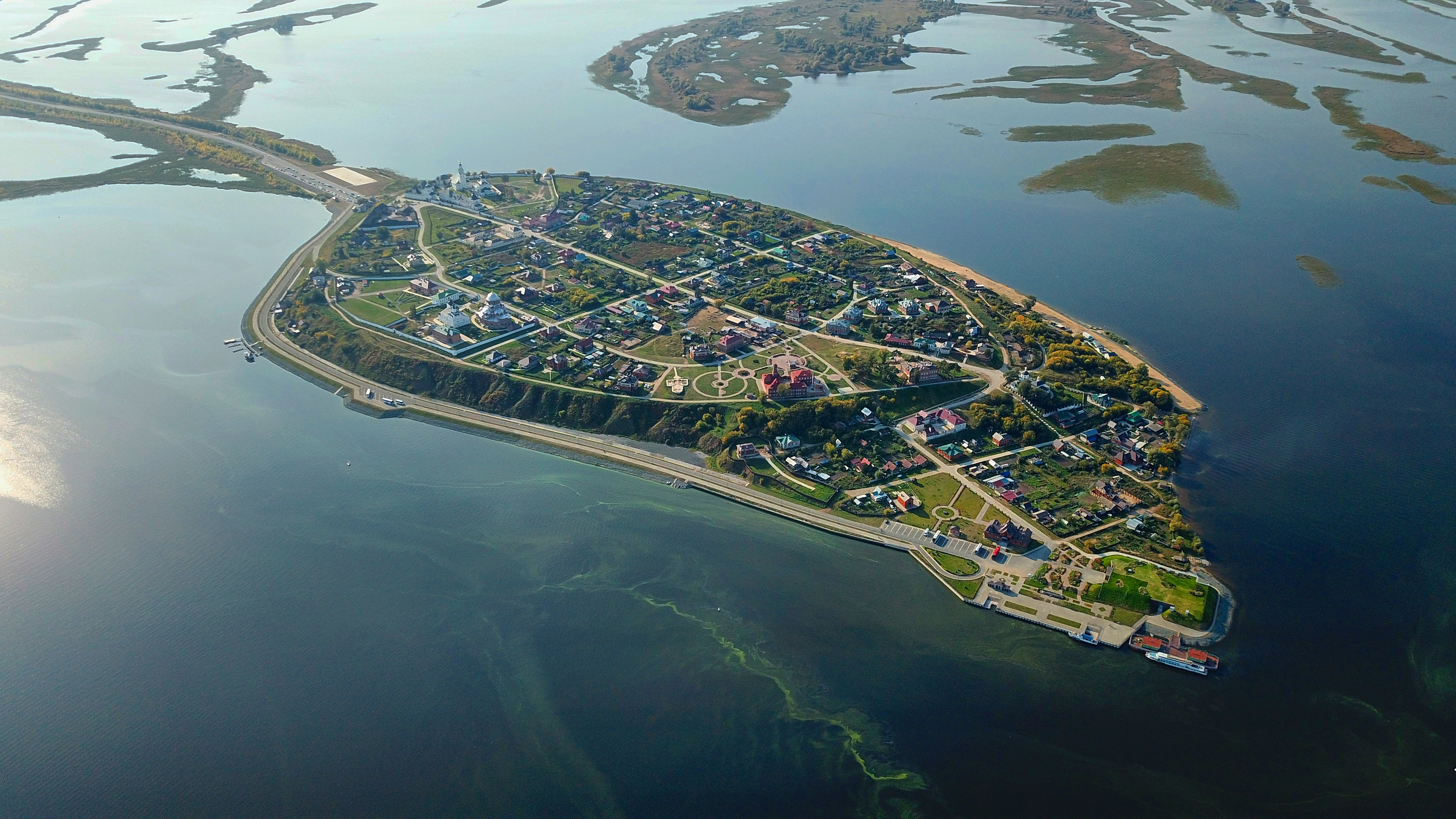
A view on Sviyazhsk

The island of Sviyazhsk, located at the confluence of three rivers (Volga, Sviyaga, and Shchuka) is part of the Zelenodolsky district. The first mention of Sviyazhsk dates back to the 16th century when it was called "Kirmen", which means a forbidden place. In 1551, Ivan the Terrible, after an unsuccessful campaign against Kazan, decided to turn Sviyazhsk into a fortress. At the end of May, the streltsy completed fortifications in which the Tsar's army was located, and in October Kazan was besieged. Sviyazhsk remained an outpost of the state following the completion of the siege. In 1560, the Assumption Cathedral was built on the island. At the end of the 18th century, Sviyazhsk acquired the status of a district town.

In 1918, Sviyazhsk became one of the first places of Soviet political repression. In 1920-1927 the city was the center of the Sviyazhsky district of the TASSR and in 1927-1931 it was the center of the Sviyazhsky district. By the decree of the Presidium of the All-Russian Central Executive Committee of February 1, 1932, Sviyazhsk was transformed into a rural settlement. In 1957, as a result of the filling of the Kuibyshev reservoir, Sviyazhsk ended up as an island. The settlement was connected to the left bank of the Sviyaga only in 2008 when a dam with a road was built.

Since 2010, large-scale work on the restoration and reconstruction of sights began on the island within the framework of the "Revival" program of the Republican Fund for the Preservation and Development of Bulgar and Sviyazhsk.

=== Contemporary Zelenodolsky District ===
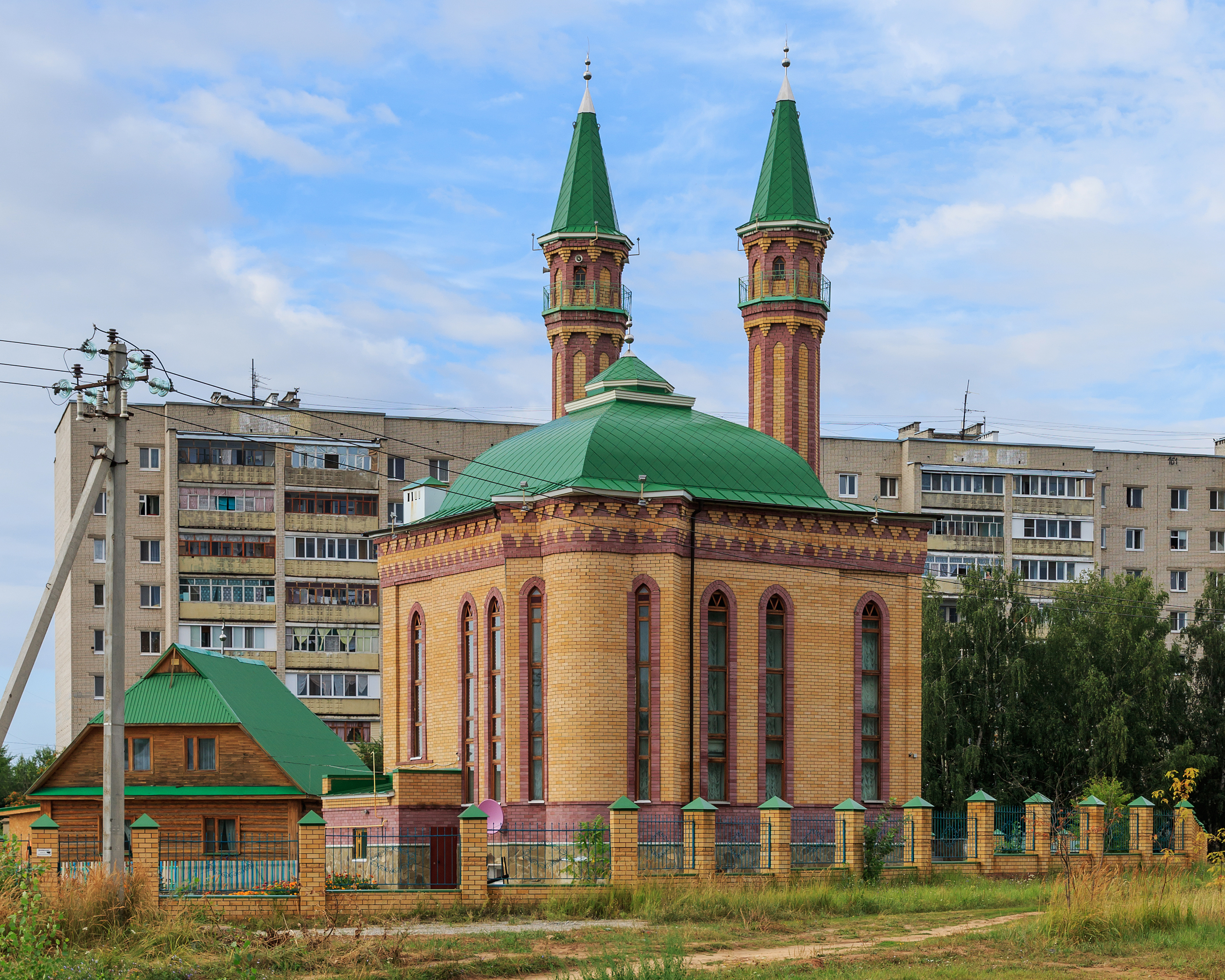
Tynychlyk Mosque in Zelenodolsk

From 1994 to 1999, the district was headed by Sergei Kogonin. For the next five years, he was replaced by Ravil Zinnatullin. In 2004, Gennady Yemelyanov took the post, followed for one year by Radik Khasanov as the head of the district from 2009 to 2010. Radik was then replaced by Sergei Batin, who in 2012 became a member of the Federation Council as a representative from the executive body of the Republic of Tatarstan. From 2013 to 2019, the head of the Zelenodolsky district was Alexander Tygin. In 2016, he launched a ten-year program for the improvement of district territories "Standard Yard" and in 2017 the district achieved TASED status (The territory of advanced socio-economic development in the Russian Federation). In 2019, Alexander Tygin left to sit in the State Council and Mikhail Afanasyev was elected the head of the district, Afanasyev also serves as the mayor of Zelenodolsk.

== Population ==
At the beginning of 2020, 165,915 people lived in Zelenodolsky district. The ethnic composition of the district is divided as follows: 40.4% Tatars, 56.2% Russians, 2.7% Chuvash, and 0.7% Mari [3]. 75.16% of the district's population are urban residents of the city of Zelenodolsk, the village of Vasilyevo and Nizhnie Vyazovye.

== Municipal-territorial structure ==
There are 3 urban and 21 rural settlements in the Zelenodolsk municipal district. The administrative centers of rural settlements in the district are the villages of Vasilyevo, Nizhnie Vyazovye, Aisha, Akzigitovo, Bishnya, Bolshie Achasyry, Bolshie Klyuchi, Bolshie Kurguzi, Bolshie Shirdany, Bolshie Yaki, Kugeevo, Kugushevo, Mamadysh-Akilovo, Molvino, Nizhnie Uraspugi, Novopolsky, Nurlaty, Osinovo, Belo-Bezvodnoe, Russkoe Azeleevo, Sviyazhsk, Utyashki and the city of Zelenogorsk.

== Economy ==
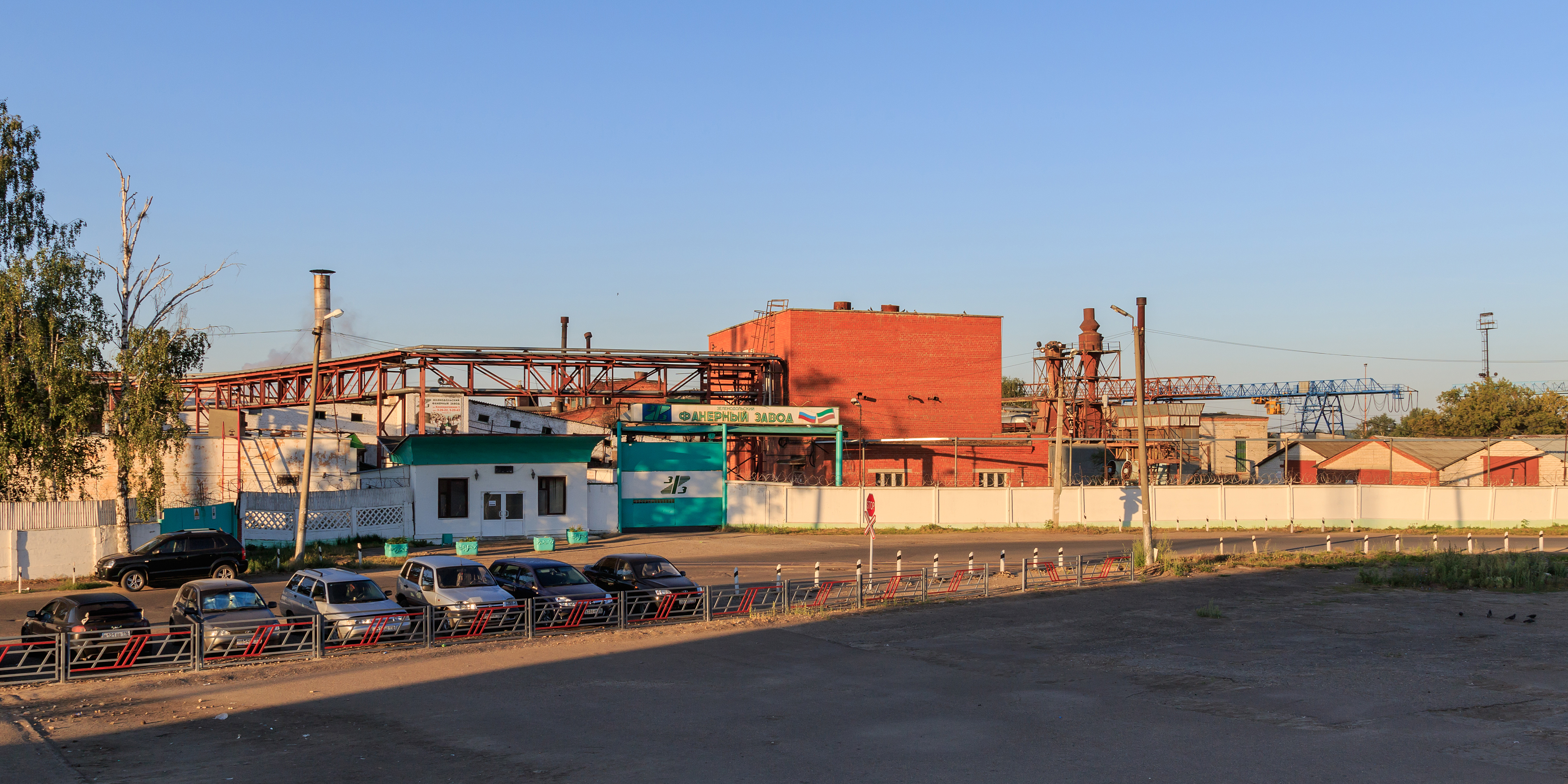
Zelenodolsk Plywood Plant

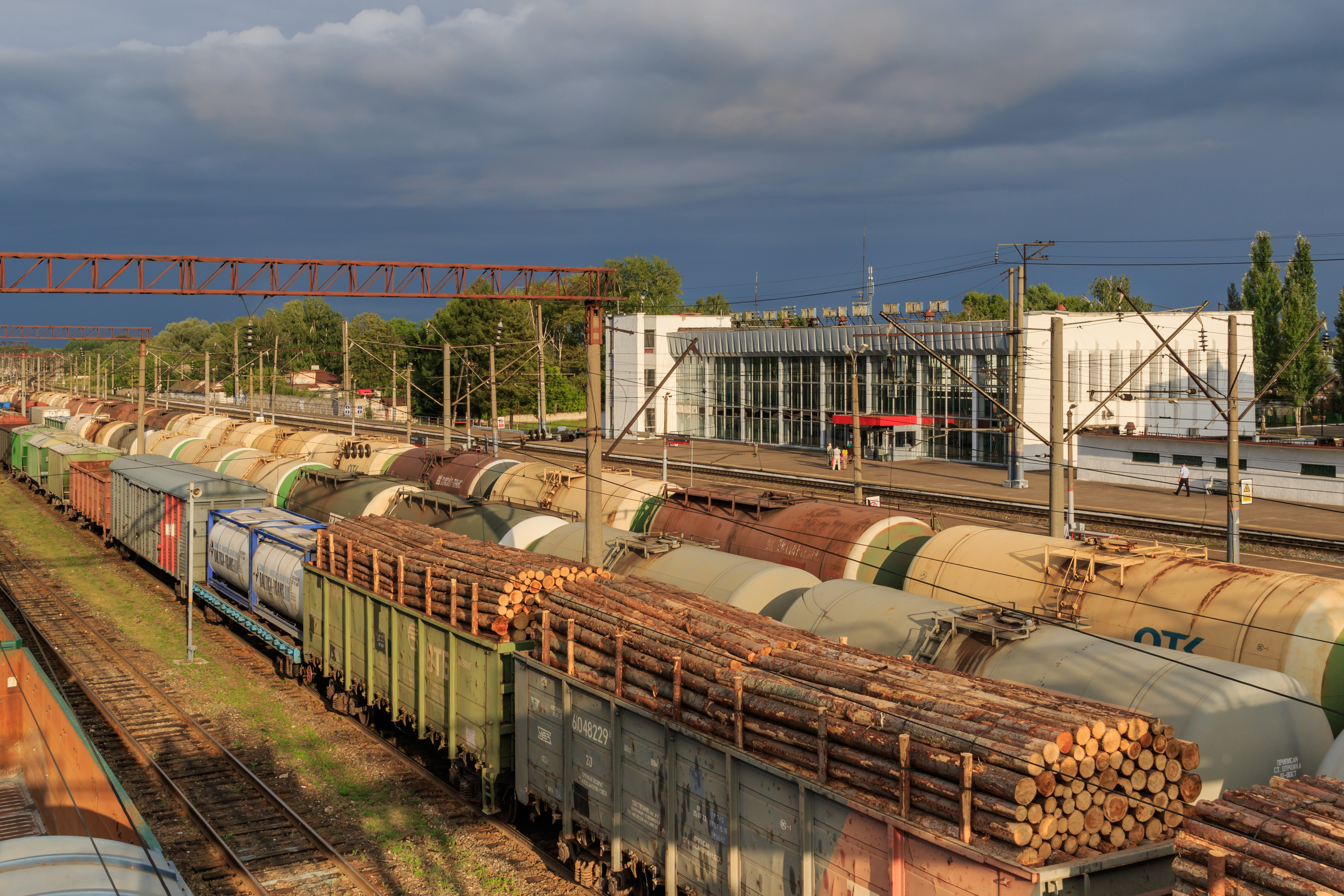
Zelenodolsk cargo station

=== Industry ===
There are 14 industrial enterprises in Zelenodolsk that export beyond the region. The most important areas of production are in shipbuilding, mechanical engineering and woodworking. Chemical laboratory glassware is also produced in the district.

One of the city-forming factories of the Zelenodolsky district is the Sergo Factory, founded in 1898. It is part of the Tekhmash corporation which belongs to the structure of the Rostec state corporation. The factory produces both military and civilian products. In 2015, the corporation employed 5.3 thousand people in the district with proceeds amounting to 9.9 billion rubles. In 2017, the factory took fifth place in the ranking of Tatarstan enterprises of the defense industry of Russia.

Zelenodolsk Factory named after Gorky is one of the largest shipbuilding plants in Russia. It is included in the list of essential enterprises of the nation. The main activity of the enterprise is the construction of ships for both the domestic and foreign markets and the fulfillment of national defense orders. In 2017, the factory's net profit amounted to 90.5 million rubles with the company provided up to 50% of the revenues of city and district budgets from its contributions alone. Since 2018, the factory has been part of the Ak Bars Holding.

The Zelenodolsk Plywood and Furniture Factory is controlled by the general director of the Kamaz plant Sergey Kogogin and his brother Alexander. More than 70% of manufactured products are exported to the world market. Cooperation with IKEA has been organized recently. In 2018, the plant employed about 1,100 people, drawing in a revenue of 1.7 billion rubles, and a net profit of 148.9 million rubles.

In January–September 2020, the value of self-produced goods exported from the district amounted to over 30 billion rubles.

=== Agriculture ===
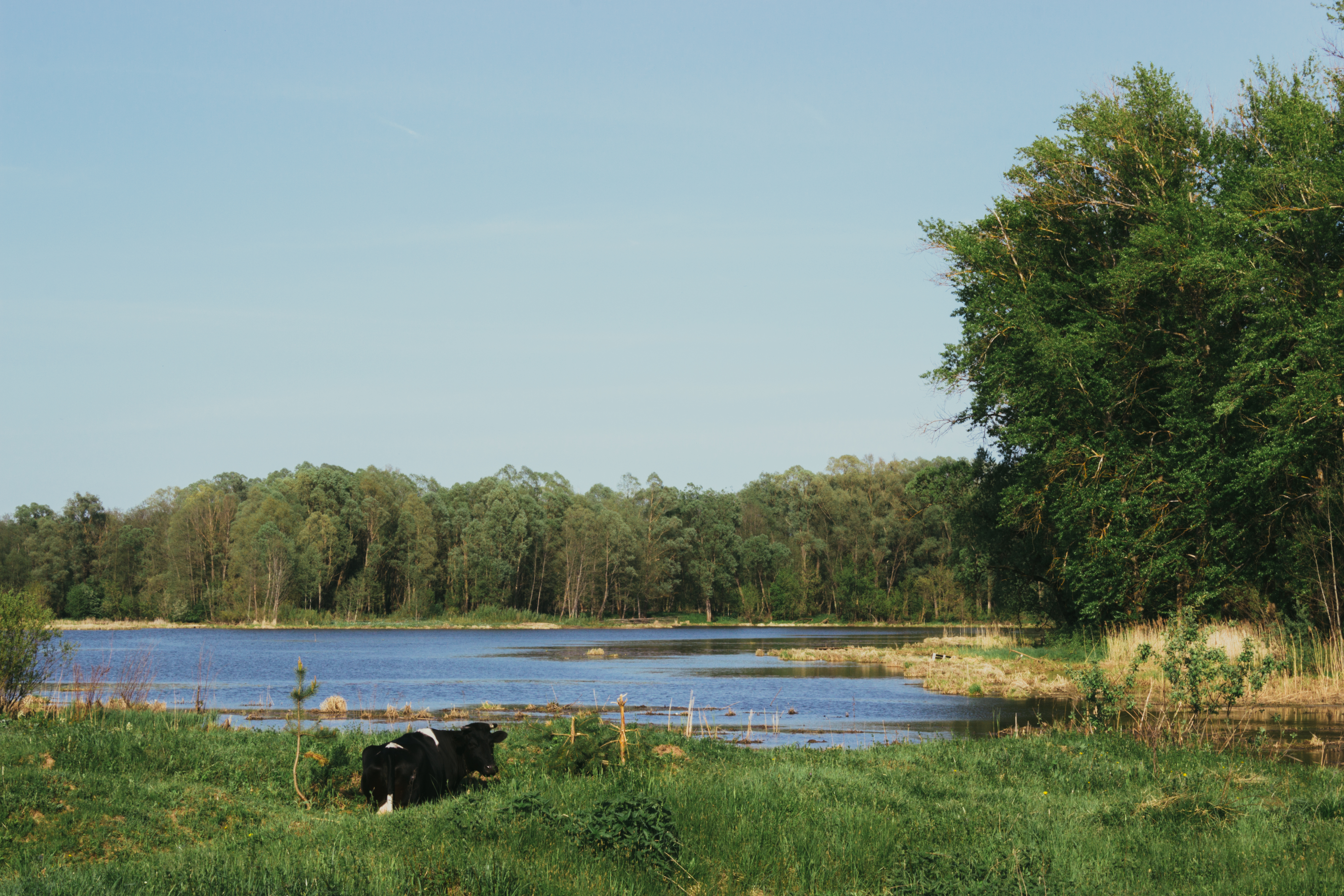
Village Belo-Bezvodnoe

Spring and winter wheat, winter rye, barley, oats, potatoes, and vegetables are cultivated in the district. Dairy and beef cattle breeding are among the primary forms of livestock agriculture in the district along with poultry farming and beekeeping. Major agricultural investors active in the district are Krasny Vostok Agro and Ak Bars Holding. The Mayskiy agricultural plant, the Kazanskaya poultry farm, the Zelenodolsk milk plant, and other agricultural companies operate in the region.

Zelenodolsk Dairy Plant is included in the rating of "100 largest dairy companies in Russia 2020" and is the only certified manufacturer of infant formula in Tatarstan. In 2019, the plant produced 89,000 tons of products while reporting revenues of 5.5 billion rubles and tax contributions to budgets of different levels of 251.2 million rubles.

Since the middle of the 20th century, the Mayskiy greenhouse agricultural complex has operated in the region. With an area of 32 hectares the enterprise produces 42,000 tons of vegetables annually. In 2013, the company began building its own housing complex for employees. By 2018, the volume of investment in construction alone amounted to 614 million rubles. In 2019, two hostels and three five-floor apartment buildings were commissioned with space for 650 people live. The company regularly supports children's and religious charities. In 2018, 15.1 million rubles were allocated to help those in need.

In the first half of 2020, the gross agricultural output of the region amounted to over 4 billion rubles.

=== Investment potential ===
In 2016, an industrial park bearing the name of the city was created within the boundaries of Zelenodolsk. Additionally, a plot of 100 hectares is adjacent to Kazan. In 2019, the Ozon and Wildberries distribution center became residents of the park. Ozon is investing about 2 billion rubles in the project and about 1000 jobs are expected to be created as a result of this project. Wildberries' investment in the facility is estimated at 5.5 billion rubles with the expected creation of about 4,000 jobs. For 2020, all the sections of the park are occupied by residents, of which two Promenergo projects and the X5 Retail Group distribution center have been commissioned. The residents of the park have access to the preferences of the Zelenodolsky TASED (The territory of advanced social-economic development).

The city received the status of TASED in 2017. The requirements for a resident to enter the industrial park is almost twice as low as the regional one, requiring 2.5 million rubles in investment, the creation of 20 new jobs (10 in the first year), and a total ten-year investment volume of at least 10 million. Thus, the TASED management plans to attract at least 7.7 billion rubles by 2027 and residents of the park must create more than 2,000 jobs. As of June 2020, Zelenodolsk had 12 residents, and the volume of attracted investment was 1.2 billion rubles. The TASED also includes 220 hectares of the Sviyazhsky multimodal center which 7 billion rubles were attracted from the federal budget for its construction. The municipal authorities are currently looking for residents for the site.

In January–June, the total volume of investment in fixed assets of the region, excluding budgetary funds, amounted to 4 billion 11 million rubles.

=== Housing stock ===
In 2005, Deputy Prime Minister of Russia Marat Khusnullin proposed a concept for the development of a new microdistrict "Zeleny Dol". They began to implement it with the construction of the cottage village "Zagorodny Club", but after Khusnullin left for Moscow, construction stopped. This concept was replaced in 2007 by the Bolshoi Zelenodolsk project, but the project only broke ground in 2019. Bolshoi Zelenodolsk was also initiated by Marat Khusnullin, who is closely involved in urban planning policy. The project involves the complex development of an area of over 4.2 thousand hectares from Zelenodolsk to Kazan with residential buildings within an area of 4 million m2 along with accompanying social and business facilities. In addition to the Zelenodolsky district, the program includes the territories of Kazan, the urban-type settlement Vasilyevo and four rural settlements - Aishinsky, Novopolsky, Oktyabrsky and Osinovsky. The proposed name of the future settlement is "Bolshoi Zelenodolsk".

=== Transport ===
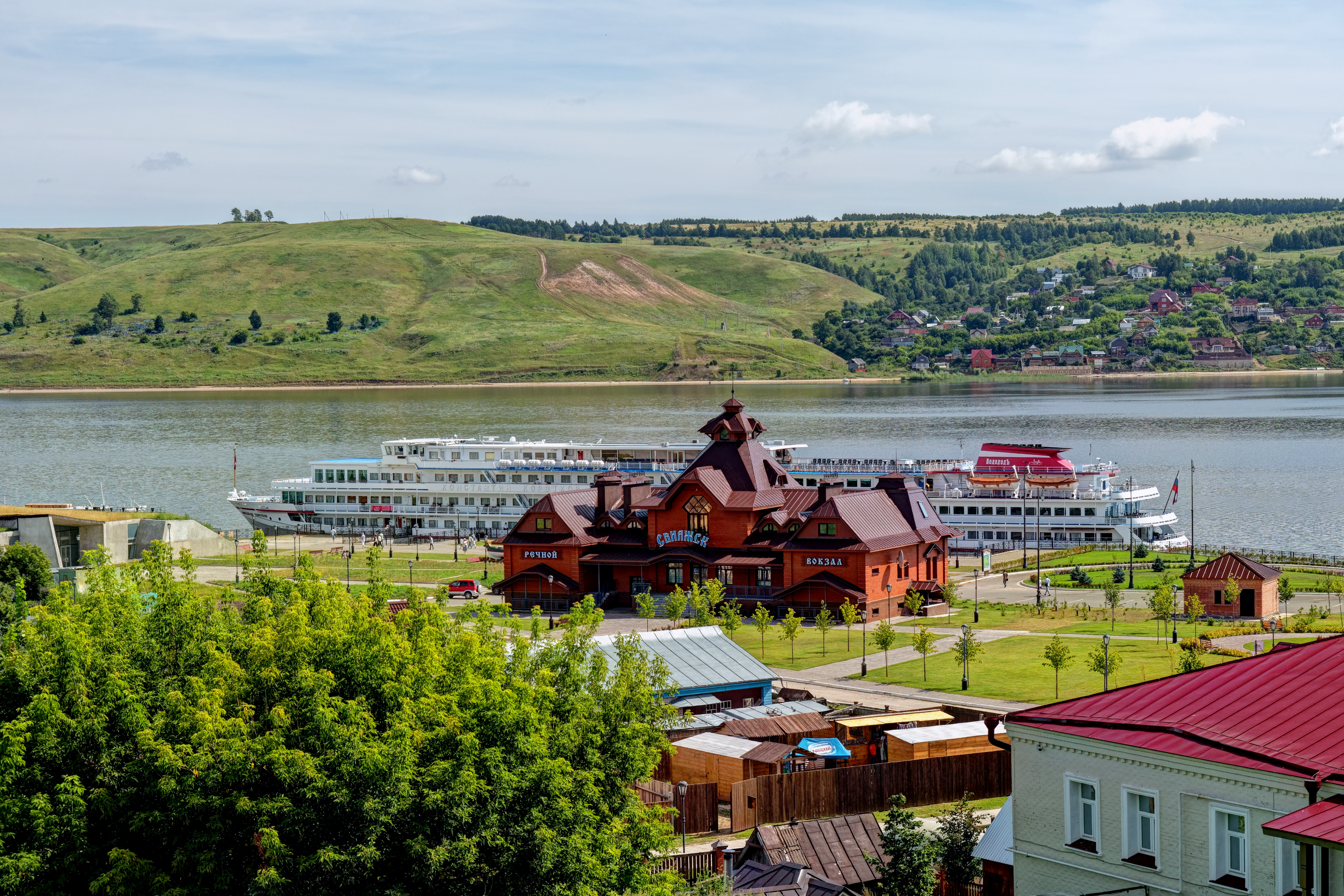
River station in Sviyazhsk

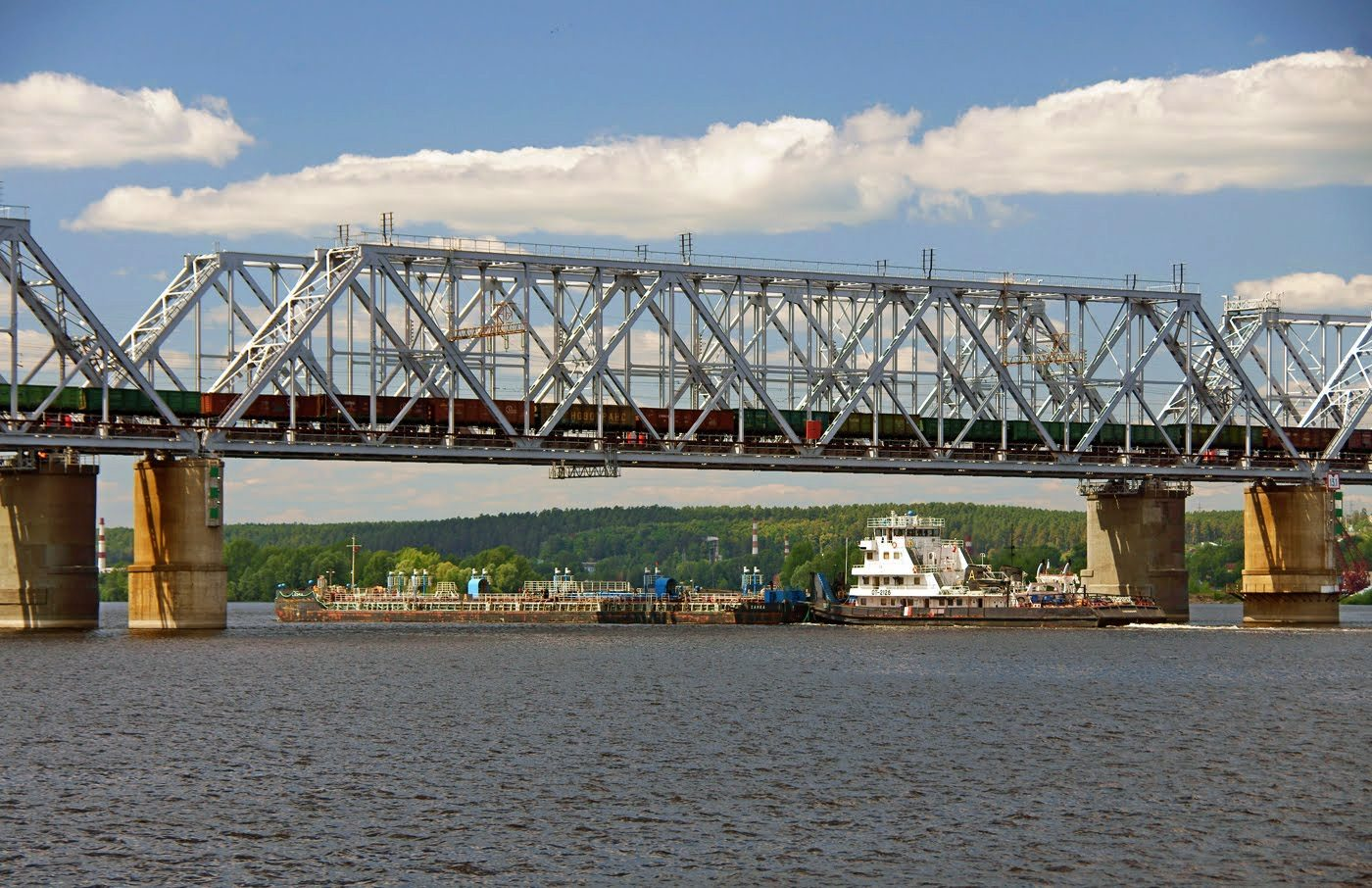
Romanovsky railway bridge across the Volga

The main highways in the district are the M7 (Volga) "Moscow -Nizhny Novgorod - Kazan - Ufa", which crosses the Volga river on the highway bridge near Kazan, the federal highways R241 "Kazan - Buinsk - Ulyanovsk" and A295 "Yoshkar-Ola - Zelenodolsk - M7" (there is a bypass of Zelenodolsk and Volzhsk). Among the regional roads are Nizhnie Vyazovye - Staraya Tyurlema (M-7) and Vasilyevo - A-295. A railway line connects Zelenodolsk with the Republic of Mari El, along with an electrified line to Volzhsk and a non-electrified line to Yoshkar-Ola-Yaransk that also depart from the station.

The Sviyag and Volga provide river communications to the Caspian, Sea of Azov, Black Sea, White Sea and Baltic Sea. Cargo shipping is well developed on this route. There is a river station in Sviyazhsk, but water communications with the island are carried out only from Kazan, though in winter, there is an ice crossing.

As the district is located directly next to the capital of the republic, the district has a concentration of important economic entities and lies on international commercial routes. In 2007 the construction of the Sviyazhsky Multimodal Logistics Center (SMMLTs) was initiated which will unite road, rail and river routes passing through the district. The first stage, worth 6.5 billion rubles was opened in 2015 and included the renewal of the "Sviyazhsk" railway station.

== Ecology ==
Part of the Volga-Kama Nature Reserve is located on the territory of Zelenodolsky district. The reserve is one of the largest natural parks in Europe, with an area of 8000 hectares. It is home to 55 species of mammals, 195 species of birds and 30 species of fish. The Zelenodolsky district also includes the Raifsky section of the park with the Sacred Grove. In the 17th century it was the main holy site of the forest Cheremis (Mari). The river Sumka passes through the Raifsky section which flows into the Raifskoye Lake with an area of 30 hectares and a depth of 20 meters. The park has a large arboretum in which more than 400 species of plants from North America, Western Europe and Asia are collected.

== Culture and Society ==
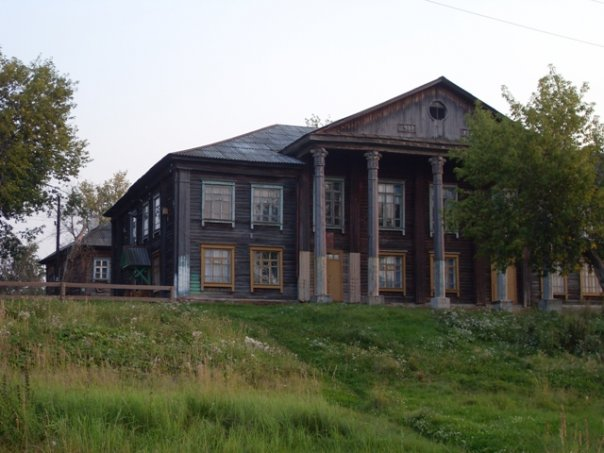
Former House of Pioneers

The Zelenodolsky district is served by 17 medical institutions, 50 feldsher and obstetric hospitals, which employ more than 450 doctors and 2,800 mid-level healthcare workers. On the territory of the district there are the dispensaries "Vasilyevsky", "Sosnovy Bor", "Dolphin" and "Volga". The V. P. Engel'gardt Astronomical Observatory is located in the village of Oktyabrsky, near the border with Kazan. A modern educational and entertainment complex "Kazan Planetarium" and an astropark have been built by expanding on the basis of this observatory.

Education in the district is provided by a network of 52 preschool institutions, 58 schools, one primary vocational educational institution, five secondary vocational institutions and three university branches. Additional educational resources in Zelenodolsk include children's art and music schools, museums of folk art and two palaces of culture. In the urban-type village of Vasilyevo, a museum dedicated to Konstantin Vasilyev was also opened. Local media is represented by the regional newspapers Zelenodolskaya Pravda and Yashel Uzun (Zeleny Dol) which publish in Russian and Tatar. From 2021, the city of Sviyazhsk will become part of the "Imperial Route". It is a historical and tourist route which follows the route taken by the royal family of the Romanovs. The island itself is in demand among tourists, for there are more than 10 monuments and six museums located there.
