= Zheleznodorozhnoy stantsii Vysokaya Gora =

Rural locality in Tatarstan, Russia

Coordinates: 55°55′10″N 49°18′50″E

Zheleznodorozhnoy stantsii Vysokaya Gora (Russian: Посёлок железнодорожной станции Высокая Гора, Tatar: Биектау тимер юл станциясе бистәсе) is a rural locality (a settlement) and the administrative center of Vysokogorsky District of the Republic of Tatarstan, Russia. Population: 2,968 (2010 census); 2,936 (2002 census); 2,759 (1989 Soviet census).
