= Mäçkärä =

Mäçkärä Мәчкәрә
- Selo
- Location within Tatarstan
- Country: Russia
- Region: Tatarstan
- District: Kukmara District
- Time zone: UTC+3:00

Mäçkärä (Tatar: Мәчкәрә, romanized: Mäçkärä, Russian: Маскара, romanized: Maskara) is a rural locality (a selo) in Kukmara District, Tatarstan. The population was 229 as of 2010.

== Geography ==
Mäçkärä is located 25 km north of Kukmara, district's administrative centre, and 163 km northeast of Qazan, republic's capital, by road.

== History ==
The earliest known record of the settlement dates from 1715. In 18th and the beginning of 19th century village was for its madrasa, which was well-known in Idel-Ural region. The population of Mäçkärä reached its peak of about 1000 inhabitants in 1905.

Before the creation of Tatar ASSR in 1920 was a part of Malmış Uyezd of Wätke Governorate. Since 1920 was a part of Arça Canton; after creation of districts in Tatar ASSR (Tatarstan) in Kukmara (1930–1963), Saba (1963–1965) and Kukmara districts.

== Notable objects ==
- Mäçkärä mosque
