= Zur Kukmara =

Zur Kukmara Зур Кукмара
- selo
- Location within Tatarstan
- Country: Russia
- Region: Tatarstan
- District: Kukmara District
- Time zone: UTC+3:00

Zur Kukmara (Tatar: Зур Кукмара, romanized: Zur Kukmara) is a rural locality (a selo) in Kukmara District, Tatarstan. The population was 1986 as of 2010. Zur Kukmara is located 3 km from Kukmara, district's administrative centre, and 153 km from Ԛazan, republic's capital, by road. The village already existed during the period of the Qazan Khanate. There are 64 streets in the village.
