= Qaraduğan =

Qaraduğan Карадуган
- derevnya
- Location within Tatarstan
- Country: Russia
- Region: Tatarstan
- District: Baltaç District
- Time zone: UTC+3:00

Qaraduğan (Tatar: Карадуган, romanized: Qaraduğan) is a rural locality (a derevnya) in Baltaç District, Tatarstan. The population was 536 as of 2010. Qaraduğan is located 7 km from Baltaç, district's administrative centre, and 105 km from Ԛazаn, republic's capital, by road. The village already existed during the period of the Qazan Khanate. There are 15 streets in the village.
