= Rustam Kalimullin =

Russian politician

Rustam Kalimullin MP
- Рустам Калимуллин
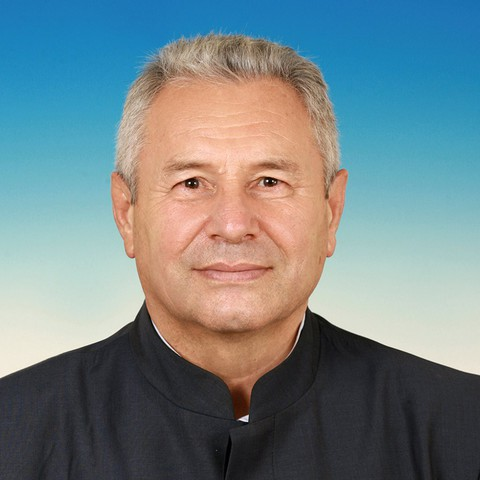
- official portrait, circa 2021

Member of the State Duma (Party List Seat)
- Incumbent
- Assumed office 12 October 2021

Personal details
- Born: 2 January 1958 (age 67); Kazaklar, Sabinsky District, Tatar ASSR, RSFSR, USSR
- Political party: United Russia
- Education: Kazan Agricultural State University

Rustam Galiullovich Kalimullin (Russian: Руста́м Галиу́ллович Калиму́ллин; born 2 January 1958) is a Russian political figure and deputy of the 8th State Duma. In 1996 Kalimullin was awarded a Candidate of agricultural sciences degree.

From 1992 to 1999, Kalimullin was the head of the Tyulyachinsky District. Later he served as a chairman of the board of the Union of Consumer Societies of the Republic of Tatarstan (1999-2002) and as deputy of the State Council of the Republic of Tatarstan of the 2nd convocation (2002-2004). In 2002 he was appointed head of the administration of the Mamadyshsky District, and in 2006 he became the head of the municipality. From 2010 to 2021, he headed the Vysokogorsky District. In September 2021, he was elected to serve as a deputy of the 8th State Duma. He is a member of the State Duma Committee on Physical Culture and Sports.

== Sanctions ==
Kalimullin is sanctioned by Canada under the Special Economic Measures Act (S.C. 1992, c. 17) in relation to the Russian invasion of Ukraine for Grave Breach of International Peace and Security and by the UK government in 2022 in relation to the Russo-Ukrainian War.

He is one of the members of the State Duma the United States Treasury sanctioned on 24 March 2022 in response to the 2022 Russian invasion of Ukraine.

== Awards ==
- Order "For Merit to the Fatherland" (2016)
- Order for merit to the Republic of Tatarstan (2018)
