= Tırış =

Tırış Тырыш
- derevnya
- Location within Tatarstan
- Country: Russia
- Region: Tatarstan
- District: Kukmara District
- Time zone: UTC+3:00

Tırış (Tatar: Тырыш, romanized: Tırış) is a rural locality (a derevnya) in Kukmara District, Tatarstan. The population was 255 as of 2010. Tırış is located 34 km from Kukmara, district's administrative centre, and 127 km from Ԛazan, republic's capital, by road. The village was established in 1920s. There are 4 streets in the village.
