= İske Salawıç =

İske Salawıç Иске Салавыч
- selo
- Location within Tatarstan
- Country: Russia
- Region: Tatarstan
- District: Baltaç District
- Time zone: UTC+3:00

İske Salawıç (Tatar: Иске Салавыч, romanized: İske Salawıç) is a rural locality (a selo) in Baltaç District, Tatarstan. The population was 1014 as of 2010. İske Salawıç is located 8 km from Baltaç, district's administrative centre, and 110 km from Ԛazаn, republic's capital, by road. The village already existed during the period of the Qazan Khanate. There are 13 streets in the village.
