= Ölge =

Ölge Өлге
- selo
- Location within Tatarstan
- Country: Russia
- Region: Tatarstan
- District: Kukmara District
- Time zone: UTC+3:00

Ölge (Tatar: Өлге, romanized: Ölge) is a rural locality (a selo) in Kukmara District, Tatarstan. The population was 403 as of 2010. Ölge is located 6 km from Kukmara, district's administrative centre, and 144 km from Ԛazan, republic's capital, by road. The village already existed during the period of the Qazan Khanate. There are 4 streets in the village.
