= Baltasinsky District =

Baltasinsky District Балтасинский район (Russian)
- District

Other transcription(s)
  - Tatar: Балтач районы
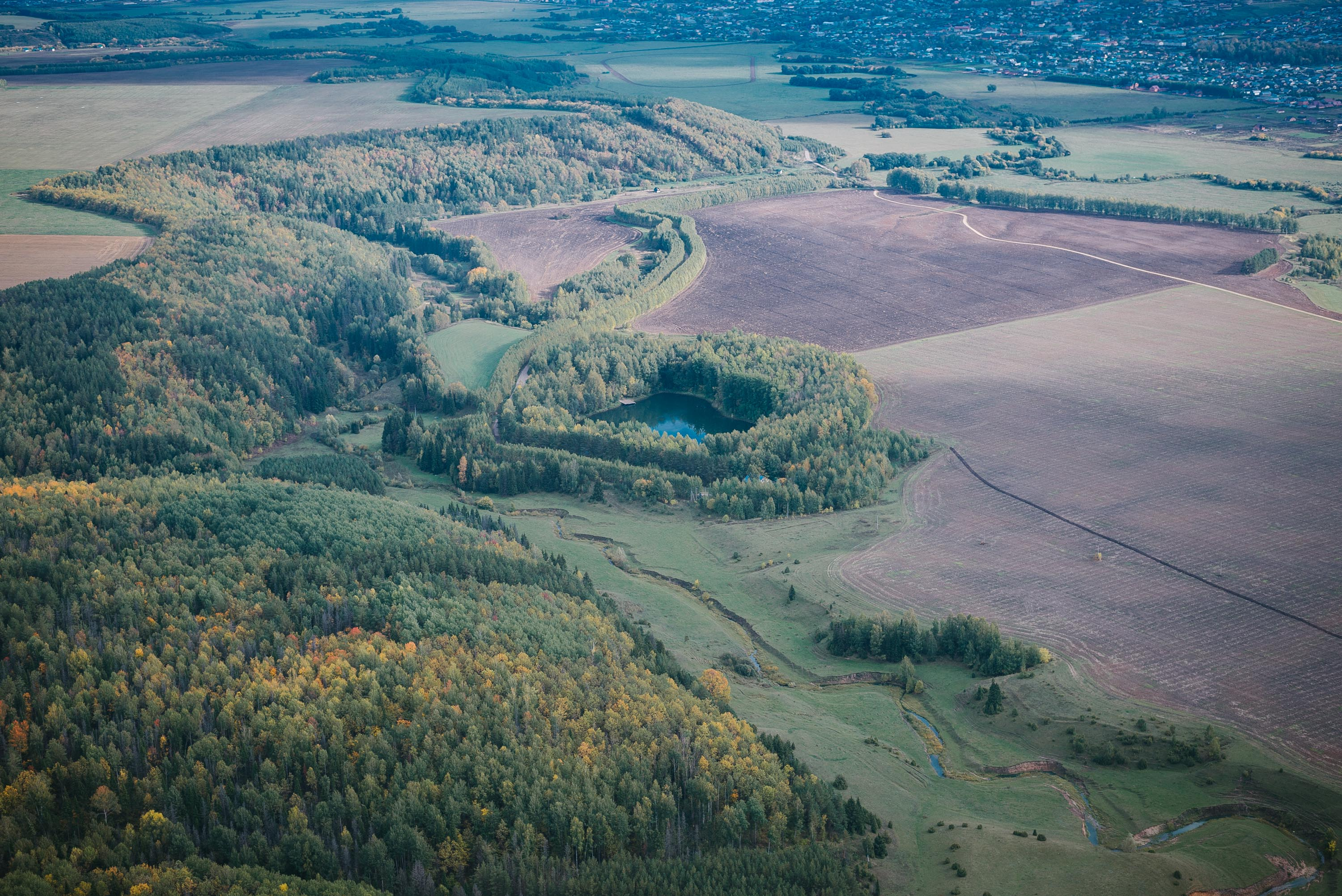
- Lake Kara-Kul, Baltasinsky District

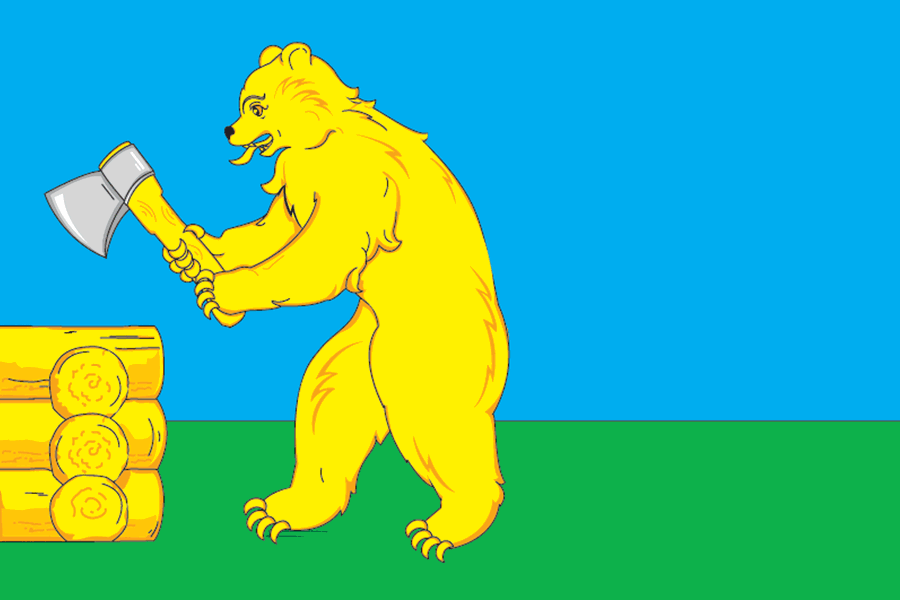
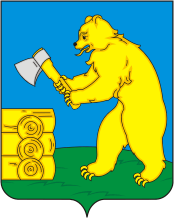
- Flag Coat of arms
- Location of Baltasinsky District in the Republic of Tatarstan
- Coordinates: 56°20′37″N 50°12′19″E
- Country: Russia
- Federal subject: Republic of Tatarstan
- Established: 10 August 1930
- Administrative center: Baltasi

Area
  - Total: 1,094.5 km^{2} (422.6 sq mi)

Population (2010 Census)
  - Total: 33,879
  - Density: 30.954/km^{2} (80.170/sq mi)
  - Urban: 22.8%
  - Rural: 77.2%

Administrative structure
  - Inhabited localities: 1 urban-type settlements, 76 rural localities

Municipal structure
  - Municipally incorporated as: Baltasinsky Municipal District
  - Municipal divisions: 1 urban settlements, 17 rural settlements
- Time zone: UTC+3 (MSK)
- OKTMO ID: 92615000
- Website: http://baltasi.tatarstan.ru/

Baltasinsky District (Russian: Балтаси́нский райо́н; Tatar: Балтач районы) is a territorial administrative unit and municipality of the Republic of Tatarstan within the Russian Federation. The district is located in the north of the republic and occupies an area of 1,094.5 square kilometers (422.6 sq mi). According to the 2010 census, the municipality had a population of 33,879 people. Its administrative center — an urban-type settlement of Baltasi — accounts for 22.8% of the district's total population.

The current district was first established in 1930 as an administrative entity of the Tatar ASSR. In 1963 the district's territory was annexed to the Arsky district but was reestablished two years later with its administrative center in the settlement of Baltasi.

In 2019, an industrial park “Baltach” was built in the district for companies engaged in production of halal goods.

== Geography ==
The Baltasinsky district is located in the north of the Republic of Tatarstan and shares borders with the Arsky, Kukmorsky and Sabinsky districts, as well as with the Republic of Mari El and the Kirov region. The territory of the region is 1,094.5 km^{2} (422.6 sq mi). The administrative center is the urban-type settlement of Baltasi located 100 km (62 mi) away from Kazan.

The terrain of the district is an elevated plain 170–200 meters high. Rivers flowing through the region include the Shoshma River and its inflows — Arborka, Kuguborka and Kushket.

== Flag and coat of arms ==
In December 2006, the Council of the Baltasinsky municipal district approved its new heraldic insignia. The central figure of the coat of arms is a bear holding an ax in his paws, which symbolizes the name of the region, since “balta” means “ax” in Tatar. According to the official version, the bear is a traditional symbol of power, strength and confidence and is considered as the master of the forest. On the canvas, he is depicted building a house, which speaks of the traditions and skills of the Baltasian woodworkers. The silver color of the ax symbolizes purity, perfection, peace and tolerance. The color scheme of the emblem emphasizes the importance of natural resources for local people. Green symbolizes nature and health; blue allegorizes honor, spirituality and natural monuments; gold stands for harvest, wealth, stability, intelligence and respect.

== History ==
The village of Baltasi, also known as the Akmanova Pustosh, was founded at the beginning of the 17th century. At that time, the local population was mainly engaged in agriculture and cattle breeding.

Until 1920, the territory of the future Baltasinsky district belonged to the Kazansky county (uyezd) of the Kazan province and the Malmyzhsky uyezd of the Vyatka province. The region was subsequently annexed to the Arsky canton of the Tatar ASSR. In 1930-1932 the territory passed to the Tyuntersky district, which on March 2, 1932, was renamed Baltasinsky. In July 1958 the territory of the Tsipinsky district was incorporated into Baltasi. As a consequence of administrative reforms in February 1963, the Baltasinsky district was abolished and its lands were transferred to the Arsky district. On January 12, 1965, the Baltasinsky district was reestablished as an independent administrative unit.

== Administrative and municipal status ==
Within the framework of administrative divisions, the Baltasinsky district is one of forty-three in the republic. As of 2020, the district had a population of 33,176. According to the 2010 census, Tatars make up 84.7% of residents, 12.5% are Udmurts, 1.5% are Russians. 24.84% of the district's population live in urban conditions in the urban settlement Baltasi. From 2006 to 2012, the head of the district was Marat H. Zaripov. Since 2012, this position has been held by Ramil R. Nutfullin. The executive committee is headed by Aidar F. Hayrutdinov.

== Economy ==
=== Current situation ===
In 2020, the Baltasinsky district ranked 22nd in terms of quality of life among all 43 municipalities of Tatarstan. In this rating, local budget revenues, average monthly wages, infrastructure, investment in fixed assets and other indicators were aggregated. The region is characterized by its low number of bad roads — just 12%. Also, only two villages have no water supply, one of the best results in the republic.

Agriculture plays a leading role in the regional economy and accounts for 51% of all gross output in the district. The most developed industries include meat and dairy cattle breeding, pig breeding, sheep breeding and rabbit breeding. In addition, rye, spring wheat, barley, oats, peas, potatoes, flax, sunflower and rapeseed are cultivated in the region. Agricultural land occupies 78.2 thousand hectares or 2% of all agricultural land in the republic, and more than 71 thousand are arable. In 2017 the region produced more than 100 thousand tons of grain, 67 thousand tons of milk and 6 thousand tons of meat. The industrial sector consists of food enterprises, flour-and-cereal producers and mining industries. The largest enterprises are a branch of the company “Vamin” Tatarstan, Baltasinsky MMK, Ushma, Kara-kul, Khleb and other organizations.

=== Investment potential ===
According to the Committee of the Republic of Tatarstan for Social and Economic Monitoring, the region's investment in the fixed assets during the first half of 2020 amounted to 1.3 billion rubles. In total, 232 small and medium businesses and 664 individual entrepreneurs are registered in the district. To support them, several state programs have been implemented in the municipality. These include the issuance of microloans, a program to stimulate lending as well as one subsidizing the costs of payment under an equipment lease agreement.

For entrepreneurs engaged in the halal industry, a 16-hectare Baltach industrial park was built in 2019. The main investor of the project is IFC “Linova” whose initial contribution amounted to 10 million rubles.

In 2019 the construction of a mega-farm for 4000 head of cattle with a total cost of 450 million rubles was initiated in the village of Staraya Salaus. The farm is expected to be equipped with two modern barns. The republic's guarantee fund has announced its intention to invest 30 million rubles in the project.

=== Transport ===
The 16K-0396 “Kazan—Malmyzh” highway passes through the territory of the district and is divided into the regional roads “Baltasi—Shemordan—Bogatye Saby—Tyulyachi” (also to Kukmor and Vyatskiye Polyany), 16K-0520 “Baltasi—Tsipya”, and 16K-0533 “Shishiner—Tsipya—Mari-Turek”.

== Ecology ==
Nature reserves and wildlife sanctuaries cover a total of 3,950 hectares in the district. The largest sanctuary, the Baltasinsky nature reserve was established in 2001 and includes two forested areas of the Arsk forestry with a total land area of 3452 hectares encompassing the Karaduvansky (“Musinsky forest”) and Normabashsky forests. Additionally, there are natural monuments in the region such as the Kara-Kul lake and the Shoshma river as well as the Surnarsky hunting reserve.

== Culture and society ==
There are 51 secondary schools, a lyceum, two gymnasiums and 40 preschool children's institutions in the district. The district's cultural resources include the regional House of Culture, libraries, and village clubs. The regional newspaper “Trud” (“Hezmat”) is published both in Russian and Tatar.

Several museums are open in the region: the local history “Friendship of Peoples”, the Museum of the History of the Siberian Highway and Musa Cälil, and the museum-estate of the playwright Mirkhaidar Faizi. Additionally, there are 11 archaeological monuments dating to the Neolithic period and the Kazan Khanate, as well as five historical monuments and eight architectural monuments in the municipality.

== Famous residents ==
- Gaifutdin Gilmutdinov, born in the village of Smail. Gilmutdinov was a Hero of the Soviet Union. During the Great Patriotic War, he was a commander of a machine-gun squad in a rifle battalion.
- Medvedev, Grigory Sergeevich (1904-1938), born in the village of Malye Lyzi. Medvedev was a notable Udmurt writer.
- Fedorov, Mikhail Vladimirovich (1904-19 ??), born in the village of Biktyashevo. Fedorov was a Soviet military leader, and Guards Colonel.

== Bibliography ==
- Khasanov, M., ed. (2008). Tatarskie seleniya Iugo-Vostochnogo Zakamia: ochagi prosveshcheniia i kultury [Tatar Settlements of the South-Eastern Zakamye: centers of education and culture]. Kazan: Institut Tatarskoi Entsiklopedii.
- Zigashin, I.I.; Ivanov, D.V.; Tomaeva, I.F. (2015). Ekologicheskii gid po zelenym ugolkam Respubliki Tatarstan [Ecological guide to the nature of the Republic of Tatarstan] (PDF). Kazan: Foliant. Archived from the original (PDF) on January 8, 2021.
