= Börset-Suqaçı =

Börset-Suqaçı Бөрсет-Сукачы
- derevnya
- Location within Tatarstan
- Country: Russia
- Region: Tatarstan
- District: Mamadış District
- Time zone: UTC+3:00

Börset-Suqaçı (Tatar: Бөрсет-Сукачы, romanized: Börset-Suqaçı) is a rural locality (a derevnya) in Mamadış District, Tatarstan. The population was 248 as of 2010. Börset-Suqaçı is located 44 km from Mamadış, district's administrative centre, and 121 km from Qazаn, republic's capital, by road. The village already existed during the period of the Qazan Khanate. There are 5 streets in the village.
