= Kenäbaş =

Kenäbaş Кенәбаш
- selo
- Location within Tatarstan
- Country: Russia
- Region: Tatarstan
- District: Kukmara District
- Time zone: UTC+3:00

Kenäbaş (Tatar: Кенәбаш, romanized: Kenäbaş) is a rural locality (a selo) in Kukmara District, Tatarstan. The population was 339 as of 2010. Kenäbaş is located 18 km from Kukmara, district's administrative centre, and 115 km from Ԛazan, republic's capital, by road. The earliest known record of the settlement dates from 1678. There are 3 streets in the village.
