= Smäil =

Smäil Смәил
- derevnya
- Location within Tatarstan
- Country: Russia
- Region: Tatarstan
- District: Baltaç District
- Time zone: UTC+3:00

Smäil (Tatar: Смәил, romanized: Smäil) is a rural locality (a derevnya) in Baltaç District, Tatarstan. The population was 791 as of 2010. Smäil is located 24 km from Baltaç, district's administrative centre, and 128 km from Ԛazаn, republic's capital, by road. The village already existed during the period of the Qazan Khanate. There are 5 streets in the village.
