= Yañil =

Yañil Яңил
- selo
- Location within Tatarstan
- Country: Russia
- Region: Tatarstan
- District: Kukmara District
- Time zone: UTC+3:00

Yañil (Tatar: Яңил, romanized: Yañil) is a rural locality (a selo) in Kukmara District, Tatarstan. The population was 588 as of 2010. Yañil is located 25 km from Kukmara, district's administrative centre, and 132 km from Ԛazan, republic's capital, by road. The earliest known record of the settlement dates from 1619. There are 10 streets in the village.
