= Mamadyshsky =

Mamadyshsky (masculine), Mamadyshskaya (feminine), or Mamadyshkoye (neuter) may refer to:

- Mamadyshsky District, a district of the Republic of Tatarstan, Russia
- sovkhoza "Mamadyshsky", a rural locality (a settlement) in the Republic of Tatarstan, Russia
- fermy No. 2 sovkhoza "Mamadyshsky", a rural locality (a settlement) in the Republic of Tatarstan, Russia
