= Şeñşeñär =

Şeñşeñär Шеңшеңәр
- selo
- Location within Tatarstan
- Country: Russia
- Region: Tatarstan
- District: Baltaç District
- Time zone: UTC+3:00

Şeñşeñär (Tatar: Шеңшеңәр, romanized: Şeñşeñär) is a rural locality (a selo) in Baltaç District, Tatarstan. The population was 511 as of 2010. Şeñşeñär is located 24 km from Вaltаç, district's administrative centre, and 127 km from Ԛazаn, republic's capital, by road. The earliest known record of the settlement dates from 1602/1603. There are 2 streets in the village.
