= Kayensar =

Kayensar may refer to:

- Kayensar, Arsky District, Republic of Tatarstan, a village in Arsky District of the Republic of Tatarstan, Russia
- Kayensar, Kukmorsky District, Republic of Tatarstan, a village (selo) in Kukmorsky District of the Republic of Tatarstan, Russia
