= Çepyä =

Çepyä Чепья
- selo
- Location within Tatarstan
- Country: Russia
- Region: Tatarstan
- District: Baltaç District
- Time zone: UTC+3:00

Çepyä (Tatar: Чепья, romanized: Çepyä) is a rural locality (a selo) in Baltaç District, Tatarstan. The population was 1597 as of 2010. Çepyä is located 22 km from Baltaç, district's administrative centre, and 127 km from Ԛazаn, republic's capital, by road. The earliest known record of the settlement dates from 1710/1711. There are 12 streets in the village.
