= Şuşma River =

Şuşma River may refer to several places:

- Sheshma, in Tatarstan and Samara Oblast, Russian Federation
- Shoshma, in Mari El, Tatarstan, and Kirov Oblast, Russian Federation
