= Kukmorsky District =

Kukmorsky District Кукморский район (Russian)
- District

Other transcription(s)
  - Tatar: Кукмара районы
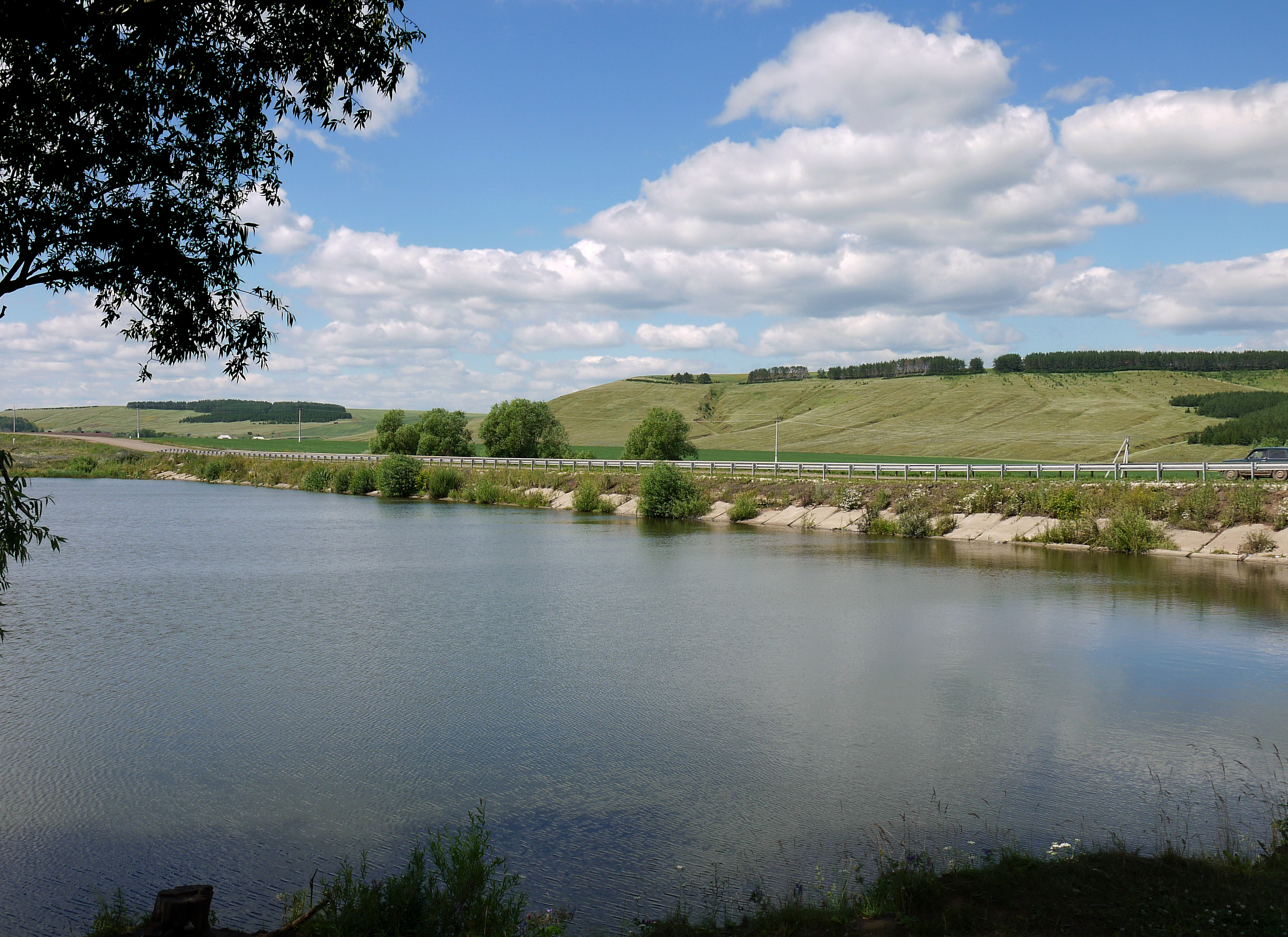
- Pond near Byaylanger, Kukmorsky District

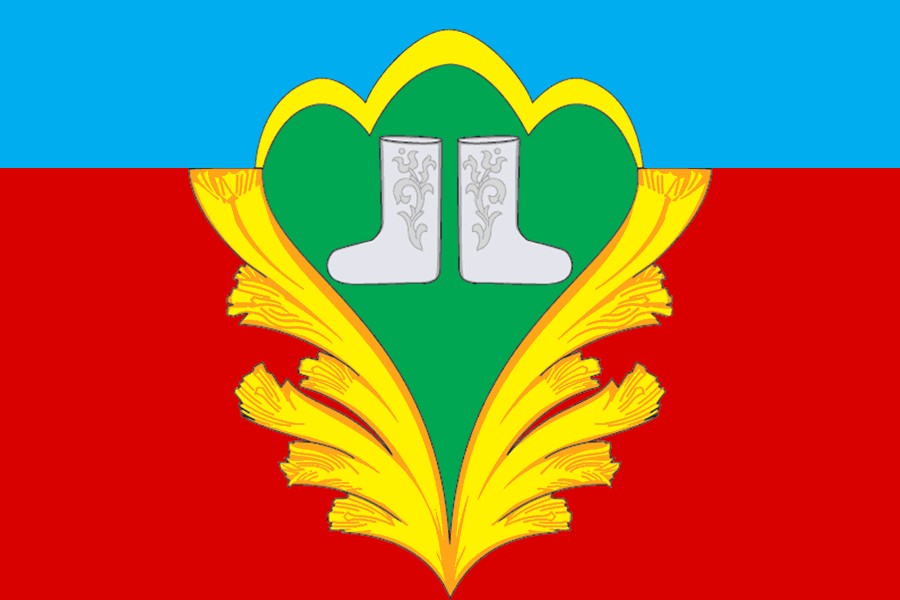
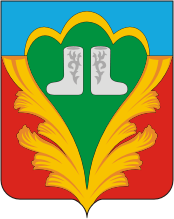
- Flag Coat of arms
- Location of Kukmorsky District in the Republic of Tatarstan
- Coordinates: 56°09′N 50°52′E
- Country: Russia
- Federal subject: Republic of Tatarstan
- Established: 1930
- Administrative center: Kukmor

Area
  - Total: 1,493 km^{2} (576 sq mi)

Population (2010 Census)
  - Total: 52,021
  - Density: 34.84/km^{2} (90.24/sq mi)
  - Urban: 32.5%
  - Rural: 67.5%

Administrative structure
  - Inhabited localities: 1 urban-type settlements, 123 rural localities

Municipal structure
  - Municipally incorporated as: Kukmorsky Municipal District
  - Municipal divisions: 1 urban settlements, 29 rural settlements
- Time zone: UTC+3 (MSK)
- OKTMO ID: 92633000
- Website: http://kukmor.tatarstan.ru/

Kukmorsky District (Russian: Кукморский райо́н; Tatar: Кукмара районы) is a territorial administrative unit and municipality of the Republic of Tatarstan within the Russian Federation. The district is located in the north of the republic and occupies a total area of 1,493 square kilometers (576 sq mi). According to the 2010 census, the municipality had a population of 52,021. As of 2020, the district population was 51,567 people. The administrative center of the district is the urban-type settlement of Kukmor which accounts for 32.5% of the district's total population.

Initially a working village, Zavod Kukmor began as a community that formed around a copper processing enterprise. A metal smelting plant was subsequently founded there and a Kukmor industrial park has been operating on the territory of the settlement since 2015. Two years later the village of Kukmor received the status of a city. There are three city-forming enterprises in the district as of 2020.

== Geography ==
The Kukmorsky district is located in the north-western part of the Western Kama region, on the right bank of the Vyatka river. It encompasses a total area of 1493.1 km^{2}, 70.4% of which is occupied by agricultural land. In the north-west, the district shares a border with the Baltasinsky district, with the Sabinsky district in the west, the Tyulyachinsky and Mamadyshsky districts in the south, with Udmurtia (the Kiznersky district) in the south-east, and with the Kirov region (Vyatskopolyansky and Malmyzhsky districts) in the east and north. The administrative center of the district is the city of Kukmor which is located on the Nurminka River and lies 115 km north-east of Kazan.

The Lyubyanka, Burets, Oshtorma (tributaries of Vyatka), Nurminka and Kiya (tributaries of Oshtorma) are among the waterways in the district. Additionally 12% of the land are of the district is covered by mixed forest. The topography of the district is a wavy plain with an elevation varying from 100 to 170 meters above sea level, with some terrain features reaching up to 260 meters in height. The territory of the district is adjacent to the Cis-Urals, in particular — with the Mozhginskaya Upland. The only exception is the border with the Kirov region, which runs along the Vyatka River for a short distance. The climate of the Kukmor region is moderately continental. Winters are long and cold with temperatures down to -40˚C; freezing temperatures begin in November and last until early March. Average temperatures in January are -14˚C, in July — +19˚C. The district on average receives no more than 450 mm of precipitation per year.

== Flag and Coat of Arms ==
In November 2006, the Council of the Kukmorsky municipal district approved its new coat of arms. On a red background, there are three green mountains in gold edging indicating the features of the local landscapes. Golden branches that frame the slopes of the mountain point to the unique natural monument “Kukmorskaya Gora”, and remind of the region's metallurgical production. In the center of the emblem, felt boots are depicted as a sign of the felting-shoe trade, which has been known in the area since ancient times. The blue stripe at the top of the coat of arms symbolizes honor, nobility, spirituality, heavenly expanses and streams of water. The flag of the Kukmor region was approved on January 26, 2007. The flag is based on heraldic elements of the coat of arms. It is a rectangular red panel, along the upper edge of which there is a blue stripe that occupies 5/18 of the canvas width.

== History ==
From the 15th to the beginning of the 18th centuries, the territory of the modern Kukmorsky district was part of the Arskaya Daruga of the Kazan Khanate and later was transferred into the eponymous county (uyezd). The village of Zavod Kukmor was established in the 17th century next to a copper ore deposit and metal mining was organized later by Russian artisans. In the 18th century, the demand for copper ore increased significantly and the merchant Absalyamov opened a copper plant in the village. During the Pugachev uprising the plant supplied the rebels with weapons. The local workers were not satisfied with their living and working conditions and expected the victory of the uprising. Because of this, production was shut down until the beginning of the 19th century. Since 1781, the northern part of the Kukmorsky region belonged to the Koshkinsky and Sardykbash volosts of the Malmyzhsky uyezd within the Vyatka province. During the Patriotic War of 1812, the Kukmor plant also supplied volunteers. In 1830, a significant part of the workers were taken to the Urals to work at another enterprise. Soon after the copper reserves in Kukmor were depleted and the plant finally fell into decay. In 1851 the enterprise burned down and was never rebuilt. Around the same time, the village was renamed as Bolshoi Kukmor and a private factory for the production of copper dishes was opened on the site of the old factory. In 1900, there were three steam factories in Kukmor making felted footwear and galoshes. At this time in the village of Kukmor there were factories with the latest technological equipment: steam engines and electricity, telephones, a postal and telegraph station. In 1901, a 20-bed hospital was opened in the village at the expense of the zemstvo.

From 1920 to 1930, the territory of the modern Kukmorsky district belonged to the Mamadyshsky and Arsky districts. Due to the administrative reforms of the Tatar ASSR, on August 10, 1930, the Kukmorsky district was first established. In February 1963, it was disbanded, and the lands passed to the Sabinsky district, but already in January 1963, the district was reestablished again within its current borders.

== Administrative and municipal status ==
Within the framework of administrative divisions, the Kukmorsky district is one of the forty-three in the republic. From 2006 to 2014, the district was headed by Rauil Rakhmatullin. In 2014, Rakhmatullin became a deputy of the parliament of the republic and in 2015 his place was taken by Sergei Dimitriev who still remains the district head.

In November 2016, a referendum was held in the village of Kukmor on assigning it the status of a city. In April 2017, Kukmor officially became the 24th town of the Republic of Tatarstan.

As of 2020, 50,840 people lived in the Kukmorsky district. According to the results of the 2010 census, Tatars make up 78.2% of the population, 5.5% are Russians, 14% are Udmurts, 1.6% are Mari and 0.6% belonging to other nationalities.

== Economy ==
=== Industry ===
The industrial sector accounts for about 44% of the gross territorial product of the region. Key activities include the production of molded tableware, felt footwear, construction materials, drinks and other food products, as well as light manufacturing. In January–September 2020, self-produced goods worth more than 3 billion rubles were shipped in the region. Among the largest enterprises are Kukmorskii valialno-voilochnyi kombinat ( the Kukmorsk felting plant), Kukmorskii zavod metalloposudy (the Kukmorsk metalware plant) and Kukmorskaia shveinaia fabrika (the Kukmorsk garment factory).

One of the largest factories in the region — Kukmorskii zavod metalloposudy (the Kukmor Metalware Plant) — was opened in 1967 on the basis of an old copper smelter founded by the merchant Semyon Eremeev-Inozemtsev. The company specializes in the production of cast thick-walled cookware. In 2016, the products manufactured by the plant accounted for more than 60% of all aluminum cookware produced on the Russian market. In 2017, the plant employed 800 people. The plant's profit in 2018 amounted to 2.16 billion rubles and its net proceeds were 262.2 million rubles. The company entered the top 100 “Best goods and services of the Republic of Tatarstan 2019”. Additionally, the Kukmor felting plant produces 70% of felted footwear in the Republic of Tatarstan. The profit of the enterprise in 2014 amounted to 75 million rubles.

=== Agriculture ===
Winter rye, spring wheat, barley, oats, peas, and potatoes are all cultivated in the region. The main livestock industries in the district are dairy and beef cattle breeding and pig breeding. The total area of agricultural land occupies more than 90 thousand hectares, of which over 76 thousand are arable. Large agricultural enterprises in the district include companies “Ural” and “Vostok”, as well as a cooperative named after Vakhitov.

The Kukmorsky district is considered the leader in milk production in the Republic of Tatarstan. In 2018, its enterprises processed 230 tons of milk per day, which was 7% of all milk produced in Tatarstan. Two years later milk production increased to 300 tons daily, for which the President of the Republic of Tatarstan Rustam Minnikhanov awarded the region the Order of Merit to the Republic of Tatarstan. According to Republic plans, milk production in the region will be soon raised to 500 tons per day.

Since 2020, a mega farm for 960 head of dairy cows has been under construction in the village of Vakhitovo. For the project, more than 460 million rubles have been allocated and invested. The construction plans include the production of 8640 tons of milk per year upon the commissioning of the complex. In the same year another mega farm for 1,500 dairy cows was built in the village of Verkhniy Kuzmes. 930 million rubles were invested in this farm project and the completion of the project is expected in 2022. From January–June 2020, the gross agricultural output of the region amounted to more than 1.8 billion rubles.

=== Investment Potential ===
Since 2015, an industrial park with a total area of 36 hectares has been in operation in Kukmor. The main residents of the park are the manufacturing enterprises Rasplav, Safiya, Volga and Bozkurt. The park provides a number of benefits: exemption from land and property taxes for 10 years, ready-made infrastructure, road networks and electricity at a preferential price. By 2026, the district authorities plan to place at least 19 residents in the park and to create more than 520 jobs, which will provide tax revenues to the regional and republican budgets in the amount of 253.9 million rubles per year. The leading resident of the industrial park is a branch of the plant “Kukmorskii zavod Metalloposudy”.

There are three more industrial sites in the Kukmorsky district. The “Ravnovesie” site is occupied by a poultry farm, while producers of corrugated board, expanded polystyrene, wall and roof sandwich panels are located at the “Stroykom” industrial site. Additionally four residents are conducting operations at the “Severo-Vostok” industrial site.

According to estimates by the district administration, the volume of investments in fixed assets in the district is expected to reach 4.31 billion rubles by 2021. In the first half of 2020, the amount of investment amounted to almost 2 million rubles. In 2020, the total volume of investment in fixed assets, excluding budgetary funds, amounted to more than 1.6 billion rubles.

=== Transport ===
The regional center Kukmor is located 120 km from Kazan. The main highways of the Kukmor region include the 33R-002 “Kirov—Malmyzh—Vyatskiye Polyany” and its continuation “Vyatskiye Polyany—Kukmor—Mamadysh (exit to M-7)”; “Kukmor—Yanyl—Shemordan (to Bogatye Saby, Tyulyachi, Kazan)” and “Yanyl—Baltasi (to Arsk, Kazan)”. In 2019, the total length of all highways in the region was 396,164 km. Additionally, the federal railway “Moscow—Yekaterinburg” runs through the region. The Lubyany pier is located on the Vyatka River. Since 2016, the district has been working to increase the capacity of its main streets. According to the new development project, the construction of new roads and interchanges will be completed in the region by 2030.

== Ecology and Environment ==
There are three natural monuments and nature reserves within the district. These include “Kukmorskaya Gora”, as well as the rivers Nurminka and Lubyanka. “Kukmarskaya Mountain” (or “Green Pearl”) is considered the main attraction of the area. Its forest area of 92 hectares is a home to 40 species of birds, including endangered species listed in the Red Book of Tatarstan. Archaeological finds from 1999 have been preserved on the mountain: the Neolithic Kukmor locality, the medieval village “Zur Kukmara'” and the remains of the 13th – 18th century settlement “Kukmara-1”. In winters, the Green Pearl also functions as a ski slope.

In 2017, local activists fought against the presence of a large-scale illegal dump. The dump site was eliminated with the help of experts from the regional group of the All-Russian Popular Front on ecology and forest protection, together with a senior specialist of the Northern Territorial Administration of the Ministry of Ecology and Natural Resources of the Republic.

== Culture and Society ==
In the 2018/2019 academic year 32 schools and 44 preschool educational institutions operated in the Kukmorsky district. Additionally, a multidisciplinary institution, an art school, three music schools, three sports sections, two hobby clubs and other supplementary education establishments serve the region. A variety of career guidance events are held by companies such as BalaSkills, JuniorSkills or WorldSkills in district schools. In the village of Lubyany there is a Forestry College, and the village of Yanyl has its own Agrarian College. The district's cultural resources are represented by one regional and 26 rural houses of culture, as well as 43 libraries.

As of 2019, there were six objects of cultural heritage of the republic in the district, including the Rodigins' Felting Factory built in the 1870s. At one time, it was the second most important enterprise in Kukmor and the second most in the province among enterprises of this profile. Since 1995, the building has housed the regional museum of local lore with 5000 exhibits are kept, including items from the archaeological excavations of the village of Kukmor, the village of Mäçkärä and the Bolshe-Kukmorsky burial ground.

The working water tower of Vladimir Shukhov, erected in 1929 — the second of nine "Shukhov towers" in Russia — is considered to be a popular landmark of the district.

Since 2020, a new tourist railway route has been in operation from Kazan to Kukmor. The route includes a visit to the main enterprises of the region, an excursion to the museum of local lore and a visit to the old Peter and Paul Church. The launch of the program was timed to coincide with the 100th anniversary of the Tatar ASSR.

== Bibliography ==
- Kadyrov, R.V. (2019). "Istoriko-industrialnoe nasledie kak turistsko-rekreatcionnyi resurs dlia razvitiia promyshlennogo turizma (na primere predpriiatiia legkoi promyshlennosti g. kukmor respubliki tatarstan) [Historical and industrial heritage as a tourist and recreational resource for the development of industrial tourism (on the example of a light industry enterprise in the city of Kukmor of the Republic of Tatarstan)]". Kazanskii Natcionalnyi Issledovatelskii Tekhnologicheskii Universitet. 31 (8): 95–102.
- Khasanova, N.M. (2014). "Otsenka bioraznoobraziia fauny ptits Kukmorskogo raiona [Assessment of the biodiversity of the bird fauna of the kukmor region]" (PDF). Kazan, Institut Fundamentalnoi Meditciny I Biologii.
- Zigashin, I.I.; Ivanov, D.V.; Tomaeva, I.F. (2015). Ekologicheskii gid po zelenym ugolkam Respubliki Tatarstan [Ecological guide to the nature of the Republic of Tatarstan] (PDF). Kazan: Foliant. Archived from the original (PDF) on January 8, 2021.
