= Sabinsky District =

Sabinsky District Сабинский район (Russian)
- District

Other transcription(s)
  - Tatar: Саба районы
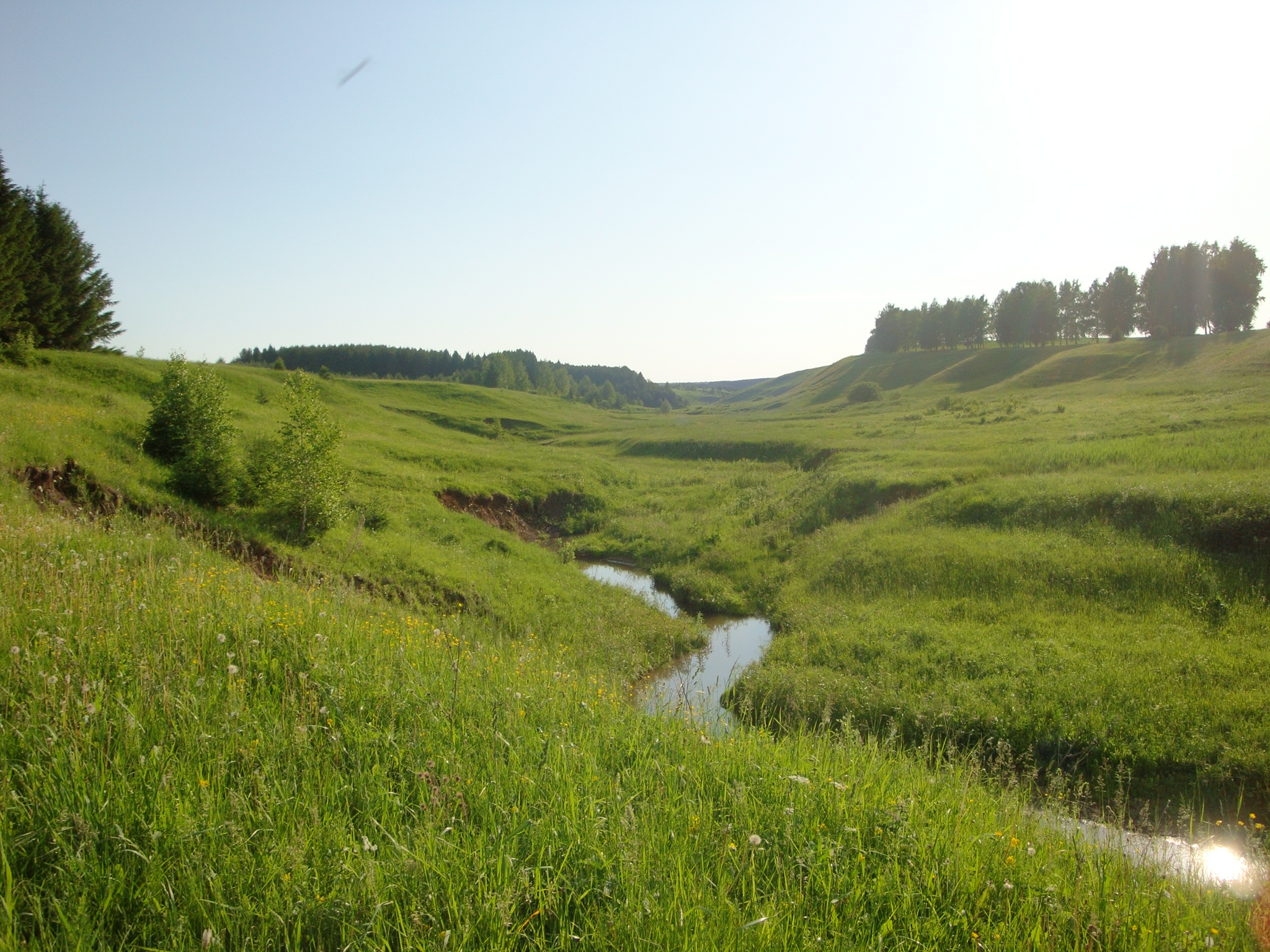
- Landscape in Sabinsky District

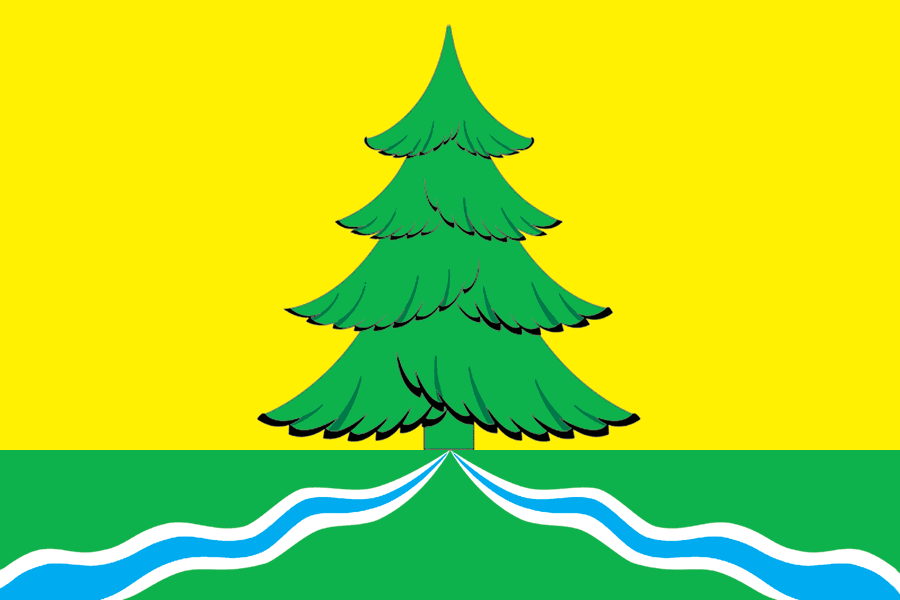
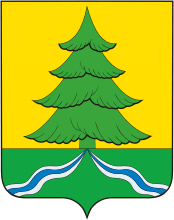
- Flag Coat of arms
- Location of Sabinsky District in the Republic of Tatarstan
- Coordinates: 56°01′N 50°28′E
- Country: Russia
- Federal subject: Republic of Tatarstan
- Established: 10 August 1930
- Administrative center: Bogatye Saby

Area
  - Total: 1,097.7 km^{2} (423.8 sq mi)

Population (2010 Census)
  - Total: 31,038
  - Density: 28.275/km^{2} (73.233/sq mi)
  - Urban: 24.7%
  - Rural: 75.3%

Administrative structure
  - Inhabited localities: 1 urban-type settlements, 66 rural localities

Municipal structure
  - Municipally incorporated as: Sabinsky Municipal District
  - Municipal divisions: 1 urban settlements, 19 rural settlements
- Time zone: UTC+3 (MSK)
- OKTMO ID: 92652000
- Website: http://saby.tatarstan.ru/

Sabinsky District (Tatar: Саба районы; Russian: Сабинский район) is a territorial administrative unit and municipal district of the Republic of Tatarstan within the Russian Federation. The district is located in the northern part of the republic. The administrative center is the urban-type settlement Bogatye Saby. The total area of the Sabinsky district is 1097.7 km^{2}. As of 2020, 31,041 people reside in the district. The ethnic composition of the region is 96% Tatars, 3% Russians, and 1% representatives of other nationalities.

The settlement of the territory of the modern Sabinsky district began in the Neolithic era. The first mention of the village of Bogatye Saby date back to the 13th century. The Sabinsky region was formed as part of the TASSR on August 10, 1930.

In May 2020, the construction of the Saba industrial park was completed in the district and the creation of a food cluster was announced.

== Geography ==
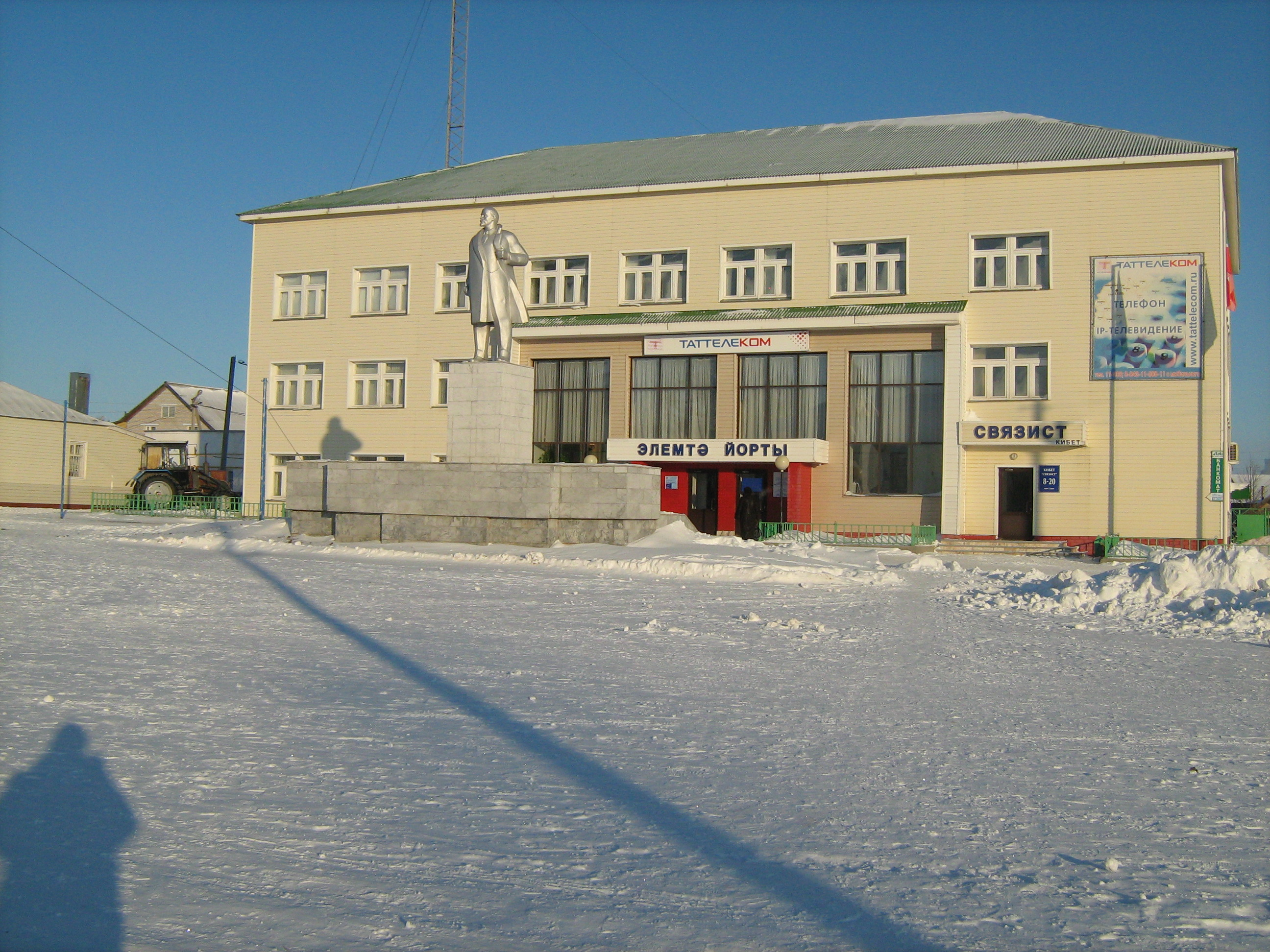
Bogatye Saby, 2016

The region is located in the northern part of the republic, on the Saba River and occupies the upper part of the Myosha River. It borders the Baltasinsky, Kukmorsky, Tyulyachinsky, Arsky districts. The landscape distinguished by a hilly plain, divided by river valleys into wide and gentle ridges. Four main watersheds are present in the relief of the district: the northern (between the upper reaches of the Mesha River and its tributaries flowing to the south), western (between the Malaya Mesha and Sabinka rivers), southeastern (between the Kazkash and Inysh tributaries), and also the central (between the Sabinka and Kazkash). The bedrock of the region includes the deposits of the Kazan and Tatar stages of the Permian period - dolomites and limestones of light gray color, clays, sandstones, marls of grayish and grayish-brown color.

The climate of the region is temperate continental, with cold winters and warm summers, as well as adequate rainfall. The main mineral resources of the Sabinsky region are brick clay, grabel, lime, sand and peat. The deposits of brick clay scattered throughout the territory of the region, are used to provide building materials. Rubble is also found throughout the territory, but the largest deposits are developed near the villages of Oluyaz and Srednye Saby. The Sabinsky region also contains more than 20 deposits of limestone .

== Coat of arms and flag ==
The coat of arms of the region was developed by the Heraldic Council under the direction of the President of the Republic, together with the Union of Heraldists of Russia, and approved on November 14, 2005. The coat of arms depicts a green spruce against the background of a golden field, from which two streams depart in the form of an azure-silver rafter - an allegory to the springs that make up the bulk of the water resources of the Sabinsky district. The emblem symbolism reflects the economically important role of forestry in the region. Spruce also symbolizes nature, health, growth in life, yellow is a symbol of harvest, wealth, silver and azure colors symbolize purity, perfection, peace, understanding, nobility and honor.

== History ==
=== Background ===
Ancient peoples began to populate the modern territory of the Sabinsky district during the Neolithic era. This was demonstrated by the discovery of archaeological monuments in the form of the remains of ancient settlements, fortified settlements, burial grounds and other sites. The village of Bogatye Saby, which in translation from Tatar means "Rich nobility", was first mentioned in contemporary sources from the 13th century. In the Middle Ages, a center of pottery production was formed in the settlement. The first search for antiquities in the territory of the Sabinsky region is associated with the activities of academic expeditions occurring in the second half of the 18th century, which aimed to comprehensively catalog the natural resources of the eastern regions of Russia. Field studies of primitive and medieval monuments on the territory of the region were carried out in 1768-1774 by Nikolai Rychkov, Pyotr Pallas and Ivan Lepekhin. Since the beginning of the 19th century, scientists from Kazan Federal University and amateur local historians have continued to search for ancient monuments.

The Sabinsky district was formed on August 10, 1930. Until 1920, the territory belonged to the Mamadyshsky and Laishevsky districts of Kazan Province, and from 1920 to 1927 - to the Arsk, Mamadyshsky and Laishevsky cantons of the TASSR. At the time of its formation as an independent municipal unit, the Sabinsky district consisted of 69 village councils, 118 settlements, with a total number of 68,066 people, with 59,366 of them consisting of Tatars. The boundaries and administrative divisions of the Sabinsky region have changed several times. In 1935 part of the region was transferred to Tyulyachinsky district, but was returned on October 12, 1959. As a result of the enlargement of the administrative units of the TASSR in 1963, the Kukmorsky district, as well as the Takanyshsky district, were annexed to the Sabinsky district, the area of the Sabinsky district by then was 3197 km^{2}, and the population was 112.1 thousand people. As a result of the next administrative revision of the TASSR in 1965, the territory of the region decreased to 1,914 km^{2}, and the number of its inhabitants was 59.3 thousand people. Tyulyachinsky district was separated from Sabinsky on October 4, 1991 .

During the World War II in 1942, on the initiative of the workers of the Sabinsky District, a fundraiser was organized for the production of T-34 tanks. The villagers were able to collect more than 100 million rubles, for which they purchased two columns of armored vehicles, 200 units each, with the inscription "Collective farmer of Tatarstan". They were transferred to the 10th and 23rd Armored Corps.

=== Modernity ===
Since 1999, the permanent head of the district has been Rais Minnikhanov, a brother of the current head of the republic Rustam Minnikhanov- Rais Minnikhanov. In 2004, the regional center Bogatye Saby received the status of an urban-type settlement, and the next year the Sabinsky district became a municipal entity.

== Municipal-territorial structure ==
The ethnic composition of the region (according to the 2010 census) consists of Tatars 95.4%, Russians 3.2%. 28.28% of the district's population live in urban conditions (urban settlement Bogatye Saby).

In the Sabinsky municipal district, there are 1 urban and 19 rural settlements and 67 settlements within them.

== Economy ==
=== Industry ===
The Sabinsky District has a well-developed industrial, transport and logistics infrastructure. The largest enterprises are the Shemordansky meat-packing plant, a fur factory and a grain-receiving enterprise, VAMIN-Saba - a branch of VAMIN-Tatarstan, and the Sabinsky forestry enterprise. On the territory of the region there is the Shemordanskoye linear production department of main gas pipelines.

As the largest forested area in Tatarstan covers some 22 938 hectares, it is little surprise that the largest enterprise in the region is "Sabinsky forestry”. The Leskhoz engages in forest management and restoration of indigenous spruce formations. In 2012, the Republican Forest Breeding and Seed Center was opened, where seedlings with a closed root system are grown, which increases plant survival to 99% and guarantees a high germination rate . In September 2020, the Tatar Federal Antimonopoly Service discovered a cartel conspiracy between the "Sabinsky forestry" and "Sabinsky forests" on state contracts that passed from 2016 to 2018, calculating the budget losses of the republic at about 0.5 billion rubles. An application for verification in 2019 was submitted by the Yabloko party, after analyzing the state purchases of the Ministry of Agriculture of Tatarstan in the indicated period.

One of the largest registered companies in the Sabinsky region was the air carrier VIM Airlines, which registered its legal address in Bogatye Saby in 2016. In 2018, the airline officially declared bankruptcy. Another large commercial organization is the Transit City fuel company, with a turnover that in 2018 amounted to 11.9 billion rubles. Another regional fuel trader, Likada Plus, with a turnover of 10.9 billion rubles in 2016–2017, declared bankruptcy in 2020. Other large companies in the Sabinsky district are mainly concentrated on agriculture, among them “Smart Engineering”, “Del-Trans-Agro” (revenue 5.7 billion), “Regavtotorg” (477 million), “Sabagro” (317 million), "Tatmit Agro" and others.

=== Agriculture ===
The Sabinsky district is oriented towards agriculture. Agricultural land occupies more than 60 thousand hectares, of which 55 thousand hectares is arable land, this amounts to only 1.78% of all the arable land in Tatarstan, yet from it the region provides 2.53% of national revenue. Winter rye, spring wheat, oats, barley, peas, potatoes, and flax are cultivated in the district. Additionally, meat and dairy cattle breeding, sheep breeding, and pig farming have been the subjects of active development in the region.

In 2016, the Kaymak cooperative built a dairy plant in the Sabinsky district at the expense of the Ministry of Agriculture of Tatarstan with funds allocated under the program “Development of agricultural consumer cooperation in the Republic of Tatarstan”. As of 2020, the plant processes about 4 tons of milk per day from more than 200 shareholders of the cooperative.

In January 2020, a high-tech dairy complex "Shinar" was opened in the Sabinsky district with buildings for more than 1,500 livestock of cows of different ages, where animals are cared for completely, the plant is fully automated.

=== Investment potential ===
The area is home to many large companies engaged in several business areas - from grain and fuel trading, to the construction of football stadiums and developers of transport systems. As for 2020, over 500 legal entities and individual entrepreneurs are registered in Bogatye Saby, 970 were registered within the Sabinsky district.

In May 2020, the construction of the industrial park "Saba" was completed in Bogatye Saby - the first such site in the countryside. The park was created within the framework of the national project "Small and Medium Enterprises and Support for Entrepreneurial Initiatives" and the federal "Acceleration of Small and Medium Enterprises", along with an allocation of 307.2 million rubles from the federal and republican budgets and the attraction of more than 77 in million private investments. The total area of industrial premises of the park is 3500 m^{2}. As of November 2020, there were 4 residents in the park, and cooperation agreements have been signed with 5 more enterprises. The project involves expanding the list of residents to 22 and creating 500 jobs by 2024.

In 2020, the leadership of the Sabinsky district announced plans to create a food cluster in the area - a special platform for marketing vegetables, meat, milk, and grain produced in the republic. A plot of 10 hectares has been allocated for its implementation, two of which will be occupied by an indoor agro-industrial park while food processing facilities will be constructed on the remaining.

== Transport ==
The Moscow - Kazan - Yekaterinburg railway line runs in the north of the district connecting to stations and platforms (from Kazan): Mindyush (pl.), Shemordan (st.), Ishtugan (st.).

There are republic motorways in the district, such as Kazan - Tyulyachi - Bogatye Saby (20 km from the village of Bogatye Saby) - Kukmor - Izhevsk and Kazan - Tyulyachi - Mamadysh - Naberezhnye Chelny - Ufa with access to federal highways.

In 2020, a major overhaul of a section of the regional road Satyshevo - Bogatye Saby began, which is planned to be completed by 2021. A new bridge was also built across the Mesha River on the Timershik - Kzyl-Mesha highway, connecting the Kyzyl-Mesha settlement with the Timershik and Kuyuk villages.

== Ecology ==
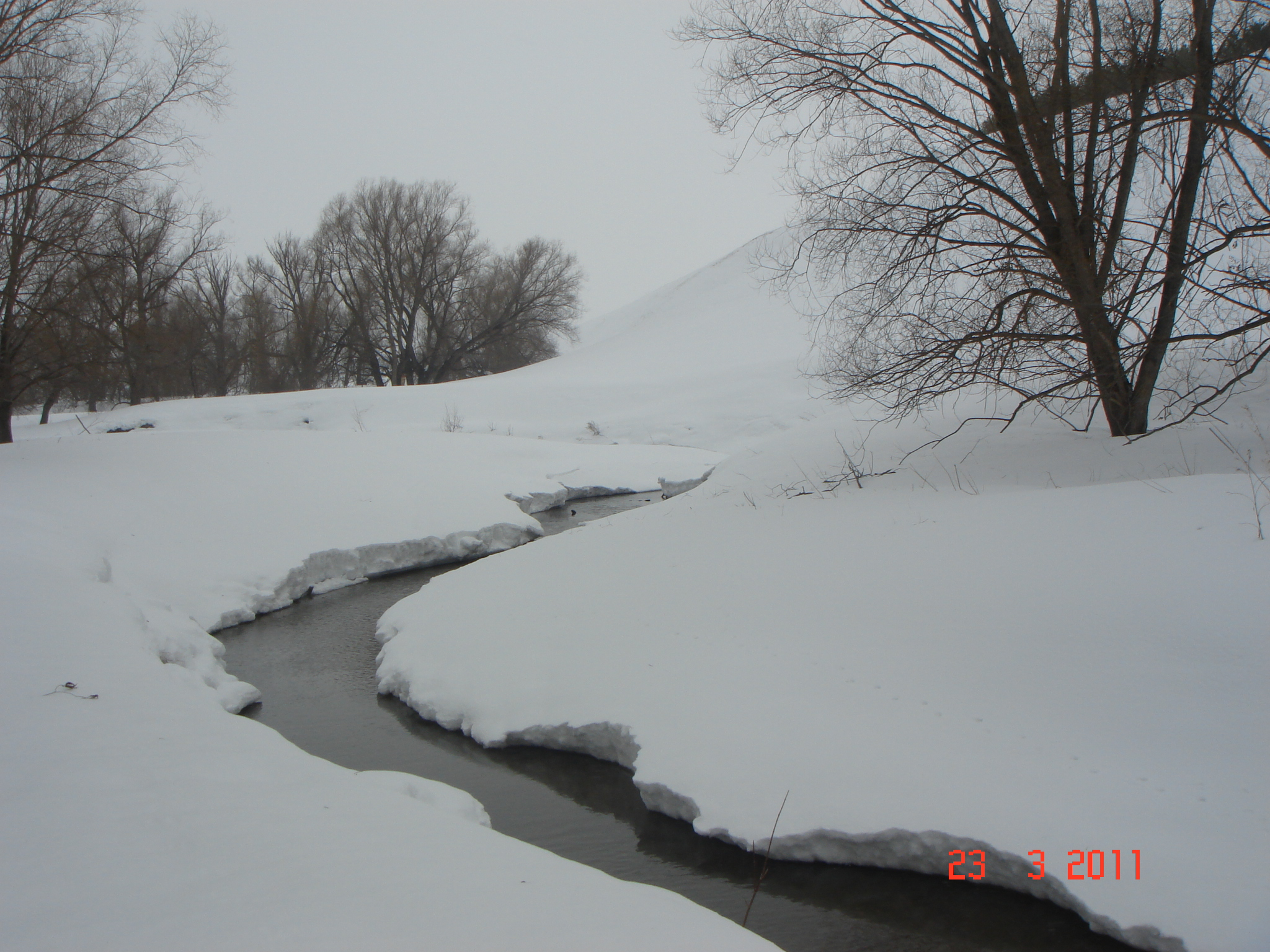
Nature of the Tulushka settlement, 2011

Protected natural objects are located within the territory of the district, such as the Myosha River - the right tributary of the Kama River. Its length is 186.4 kilometers and the total area of its basin is 4180 km^{2}. The rivers Nyrsa, Oshnyak, Betka, Shumbut and Bersut flow through the reserve. Its forests are inhabited by moose, roe deer, wild boars, foxes, American minks, lynxes, hares, and white hares.

From 1977 to 2009 in the territory of the Sabinsky and Kukmorsky districts the State Natural Hunting Reserve "Sabinsky" with an area of 19.4 thousand hectares, of which most - 14.1 thousand hectares were operated as forest lands. After the dissolution of the reserve, its territory and functions were transferred to the Sabinsky forestry enterprise.

== Social area ==
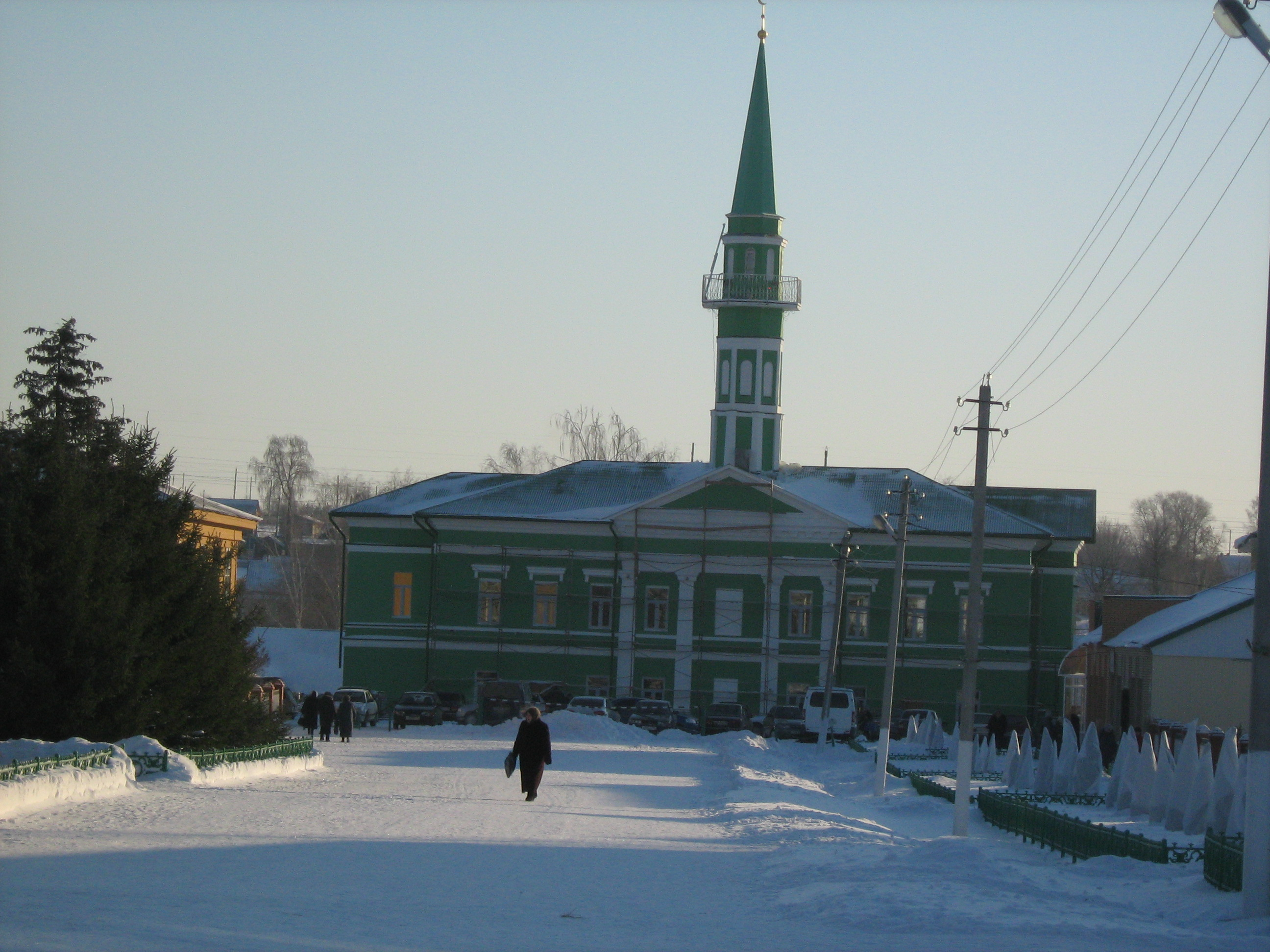
A local mosque in the Sabinsky district, 2011

In 2016, the Sabinsky district administration banned the widespread trade in alcohol on the territory of the Sabinsky district, creating specialized stores for its sale under the designation of "Haram" (according to Sharia - "sinful, forbidden").

In total, there are 58 mosques in the district as of 2020. Over the past two years, new mosques have been opened in the villages of Martynovo and Yelyshevo.

The region traditionally does not position itself as a tourist designation. In the high season the villages of the Sabinsky district receive about a thousand visitors. However, in the summer of 2020, against the background of the COVID-19 pandemic and the development of domestic tourism in the region, it entered the republican project "Tatarstan - 1001 Pleasure" (most of the funds from attracted tourists remain in the local budget). Local attractions include the Museum of the History of the Madrasah in the village of Satyshevo, founded in 1865 - at that time the madrasah became the first brick building in the entire village and one of the largest in the region. The building was restored and opened as a museum in 2018. The exposition is dedicated to the old school for muftis and imams. Another attraction is the Museum of the Life and Creativity of the Tatar People's Artist Shaukat Biktimirov, where his stage costumes, makeup, awards, photographs, and household items are displayed. The Museum of the History of the Sabinsky Forestry is the only such thematic museum in Tatarstan. Institutions like the Sabinsky House of culture where there are 14 children and adult art clubs operating at the Palace of Culture offer spaces for cultural education and activities. The facade of the building was repaired for the Palace's 50th anniversary in 2020.

In addition, the region has 25 rural houses of culture, 30 rural clubs, 3 auto clubs, a regional children's library, 27 rural libraries and a regional museum of local history. The region counts 77 educational institutions, including 47 preschool, 7 primary, 17 secondary, gymnasium, lyceums and two boarding schools. The Sabinsky Agrarian College is considered one of the republic leaders in the field of vocational education. In 2011, the college was included in the scientific and educational cluster of the Kazan State Agrarian University.

The regional newspaper "Saba tainary" ("Sabinskiye Zori") is published in the Tatar language.

== Famous people ==
- Kamalov Alyametdin – First Secretary of the Sabinsky District Committee of the CPSU from 1974 to 1983
- Landysh Falyakhova (1998, village of Dva Polya Artash–) – ice hockey player
- Fayzrakhmanova Gulfiya – artist of the Chelninsky State Drama Theater, a native of the village of Oluyaz
- Askarov Ilfat - artist of the Naberezhnye Chelny State Tatar Drama Theater, Honored Artist of the Republic of Tatarstan, originally from the village of Bolshiye Kibyachi
- Khasanov Kalimulla (1878, village of Chulpych–1949) – deputy of the 2nd State Duma (1907) from the Ufa province
- Timirov Mingaz (1914, village of Elyshevo–2006) - retired colonel, organizer of the veteran movement in Kazan, Honored Worker of Culture of the Republic of Tatarstan, participant in the Victory parades in Moscow
- Absalyamov Minzakir (1901, village of Upper Otary–1962) – Soviet military leader, major general. Doctor of Military Sciences, Associate Professor
- Taslima Nizami (1956, village of Tuktar–) – Tatar poet, composer and singer, Honored Artist of the Republic of Tatarstan, author of more than 500 popular songs in the Tatar language
- Biktemirov Shaukat (1928, village of Minger–2012) – theater and film actor, People's Artist of the USSR (1977)
- Khabibullin Zaki (1911, village of Upper Otary–1945) – Hero of the Soviet Union
