= Tyulyachinsky District =

Tyulachinsky District Тюлячинский район (Russian)
- District

Other transcription(s)
  - Tatar: Теләче районы
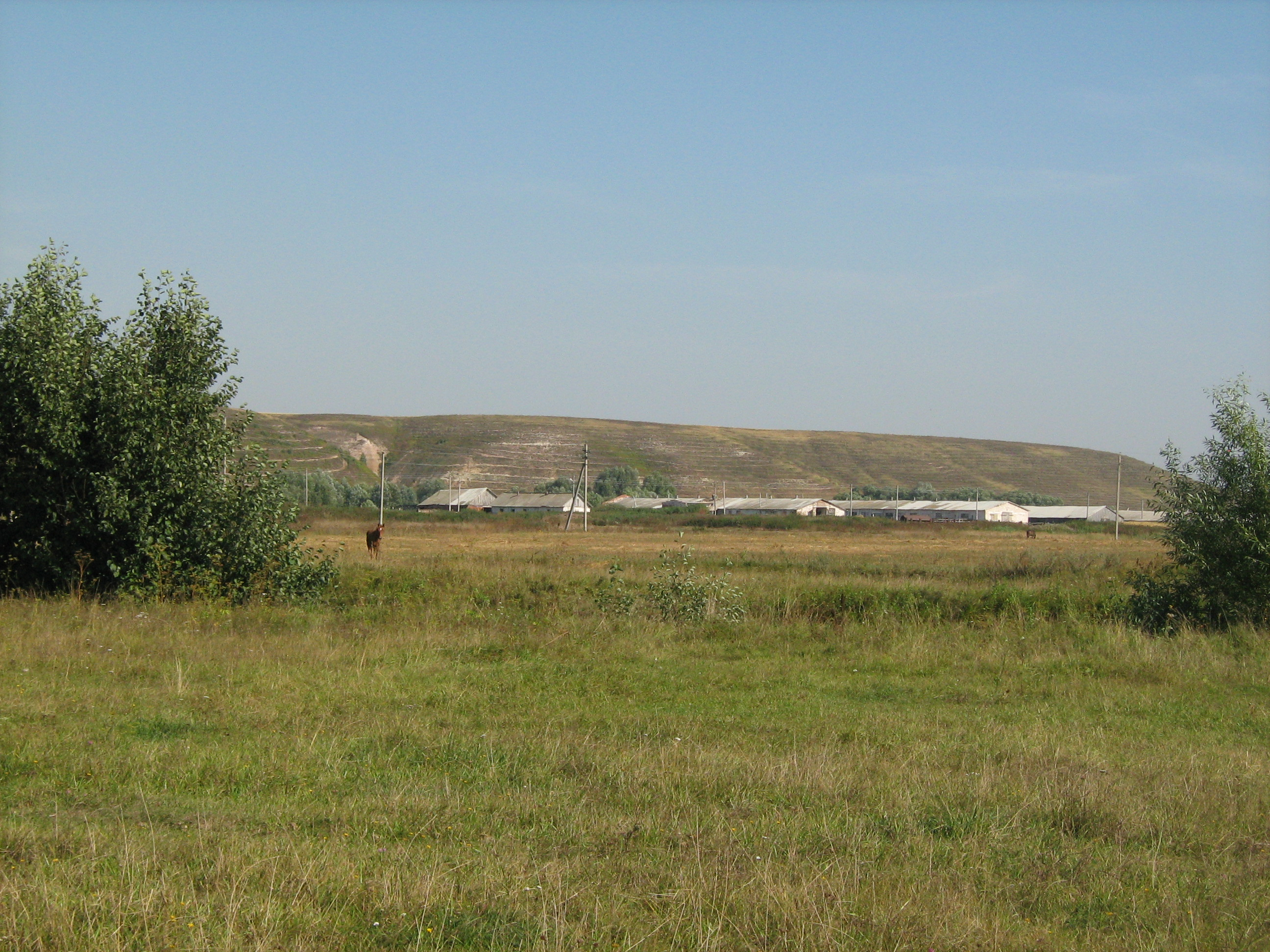
- Ferma, Tyulachinsky District

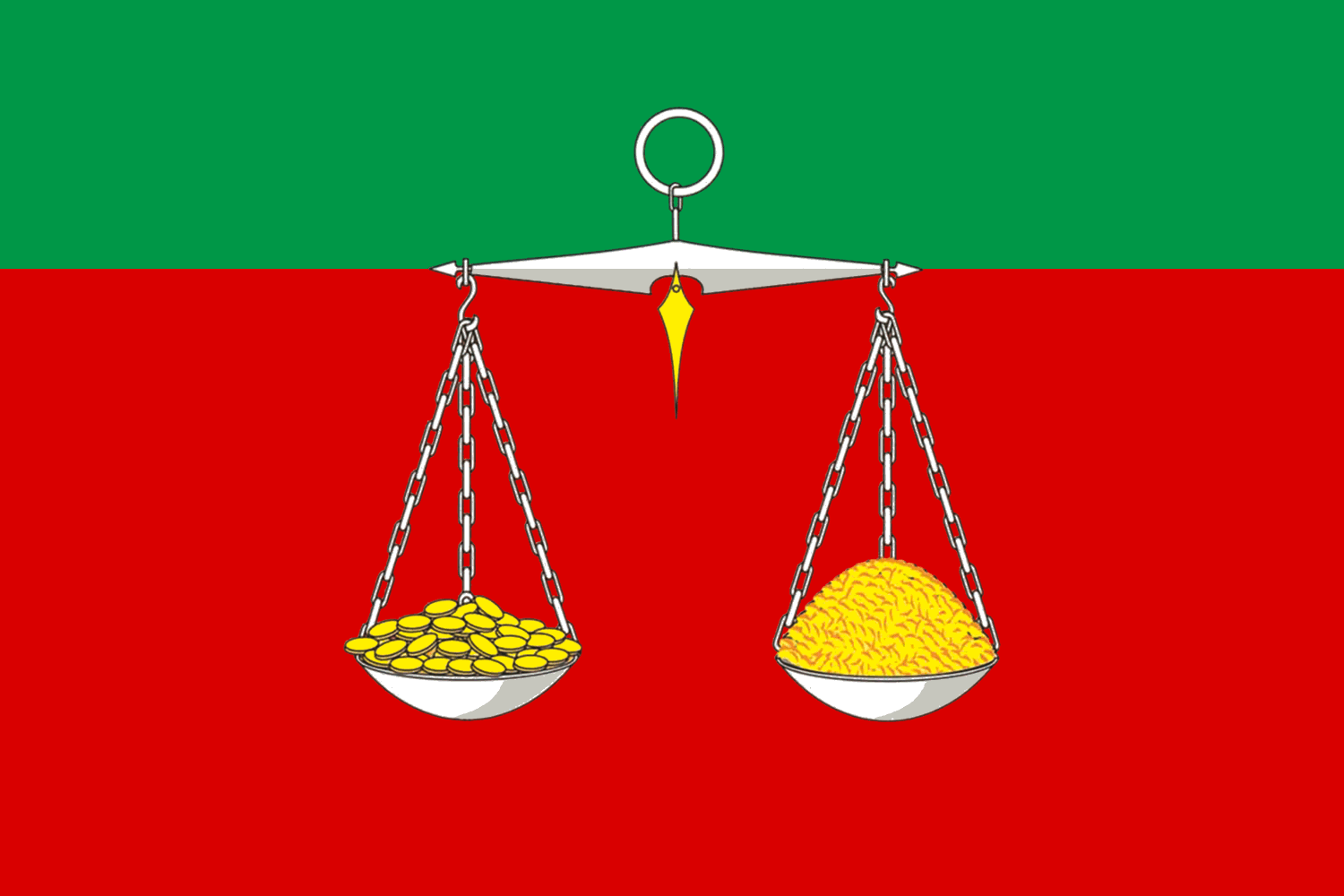
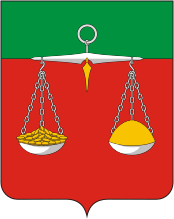
- Flag Coat of arms
- Location of Tyulachinsky District in the Republic of Tatarstan
- Coordinates: 55°51′N 50°15′E
- Country: Russia
- Federal subject: Republic of Tatarstan
- Established: 1935
- Administrative center: Tyulyachi

Area
  - Total: 844.1 km^{2} (325.9 sq mi)

Population (2010 Census)
  - Total: 14,273
  - Density: 16.91/km^{2} (43.79/sq mi)
  - Urban: 0%
  - Rural: 100%

Administrative structure
  - Inhabited localities: 53 rural localities

Municipal structure
  - Municipally incorporated as: Tyulyachinsky Municipal District
  - Municipal divisions: 0 urban settlements, 13 rural settlements
- Time zone: UTC+3 (MSK)
- OKTMO ID: 92656000
- Website: http://tulachi.tatarstan.ru

Tyulachinsky District (Russian: Тюлячинский райо́н; Tatar: Теләче районы) is a territorial administrative unit and municipal district of the Republic of Tatarstan within the Russian Federation. The total area of the district is 1160 km². The district is located in the north of Tatarstan. The administrative center of the district is the village of Tyulyachi. As of 2020, 13,778 people reside in the district.

The district economy is mainly oriented towards agriculture. The main areas of production are the cultivation of field crops and animal husbandry. There is the hunting reserve "Meshinsky" in the district that aims at nature conserving as a means of wildlife preservation. The total area of the reserve is 131.7 thousand hectares.

== Geography ==
The district is located in the northern part of the Republic of Tatarstan and is fully enclosed by other districts of the region, namely the Sabinsky District, Mamadyshsky District, Rybno-Slobodsky District, Pestrechinsky District, and Arsky District.

== Coat of arms and flag ==
The regional coat of arms depicts scales filled with coins and grain which is a symbol of a large fair that was once held in the village of Tyulyachi. Libra symbolizes the modern development potential of the region and at the same time its rich historical and cultural heritage. The green chapter of the coat of arms reflects the agricultural orientation of the area, as well as nature, health, youth, life, and growth. The gold color on the flag is a symbol of harvest, wealth, intelligence, respect; silver - clarity, openness, reconciliation, innocence; red - courage, strength, hard work and celebration. The coat of arms was approved by the decision of the Tyulyachinsky District Council on December 23, 2006.

== History ==
It is believed that the village of Tyulyachi was founded during the period of the late Golden Horde and the early Khanate of Kazan. The modern Tyulyachinsky district was formed on January 25, 1935, on October 12, 1959, it was liquidated with the transfer of the territory to the Sabinsky municipality, but already on November 28, 1991, the Supreme Soviet of the republic recreated the Tyulyachinsky district.

In 2015, the Tyulyachinsky district and the Turkish municipality of Gebze became sister cities.

Zaripov Ildus headed the district from 2011 to 2019. His name has been associated with one of the largest corruption scandals in the region – since 2015, a number of regional entrepreneurs have appealed to the prosecutor's office accusing the Stroitel company in illegal activities while Zaripov often acted as the guarantor of the company's transactions. However, Zaripov currently denies all accusations. In 2019, he was designated as a head of the Laishevsky District. In September 2019, the former Deputy Minister of Agriculture and Food of Tatarstan Nazip Khazipov was appointed the head of Tyulyachinsky district.

== Municipal-territorial structure ==
The ethnic composition of the district (according to the 2010 census) consisted of 13 778 people, out of which Tatars constitute 88%, Russians 11%, and other nationalities – 1%.

== Economy ==
=== Industry ===
One of the largest industrial enterprises in the region is the Tyulyachinsky butter-dairy plant, a branch of the Vamin-Tatarstan butter plant. Other large commercial entities include the Tyulyachinskaya furniture factory, the carrier Tyulyachiagrokhimservice, the Arsk branch of the road section of the Tatavtodor company, the Tyulyachinskaya regional operational and gas service Saby Gaz and the local brick factory.

=== Agriculture ===
The district is oriented towards the agricultural industry. There are more than 30 economic entities of various forms of ownership, including peasant farms and personal household plots. The main areas of production activity are the cultivation of field crops and animal husbandry. Large agricultural enterprises in the region include Maksabash, the Alan livestock company, the Vamin-Tyulyachi and Igenche agricultural firms. There are also many family farms here.

In 2020, the manufacturer of plant protection chemicals, the August company, acquired a seed farm with an area of 10 thousand hectares in the region, which allowed the August agricultural bank to approach the areas of the largest agricultural companies in the region. At the same time, in the village of Alan, a fodder center with a capacity of 50 m³ of mono-feed per hour was opened and the foundation was laid for the future dairy complex for a thousand heads of cattle, which was expected to be launched in 2021.

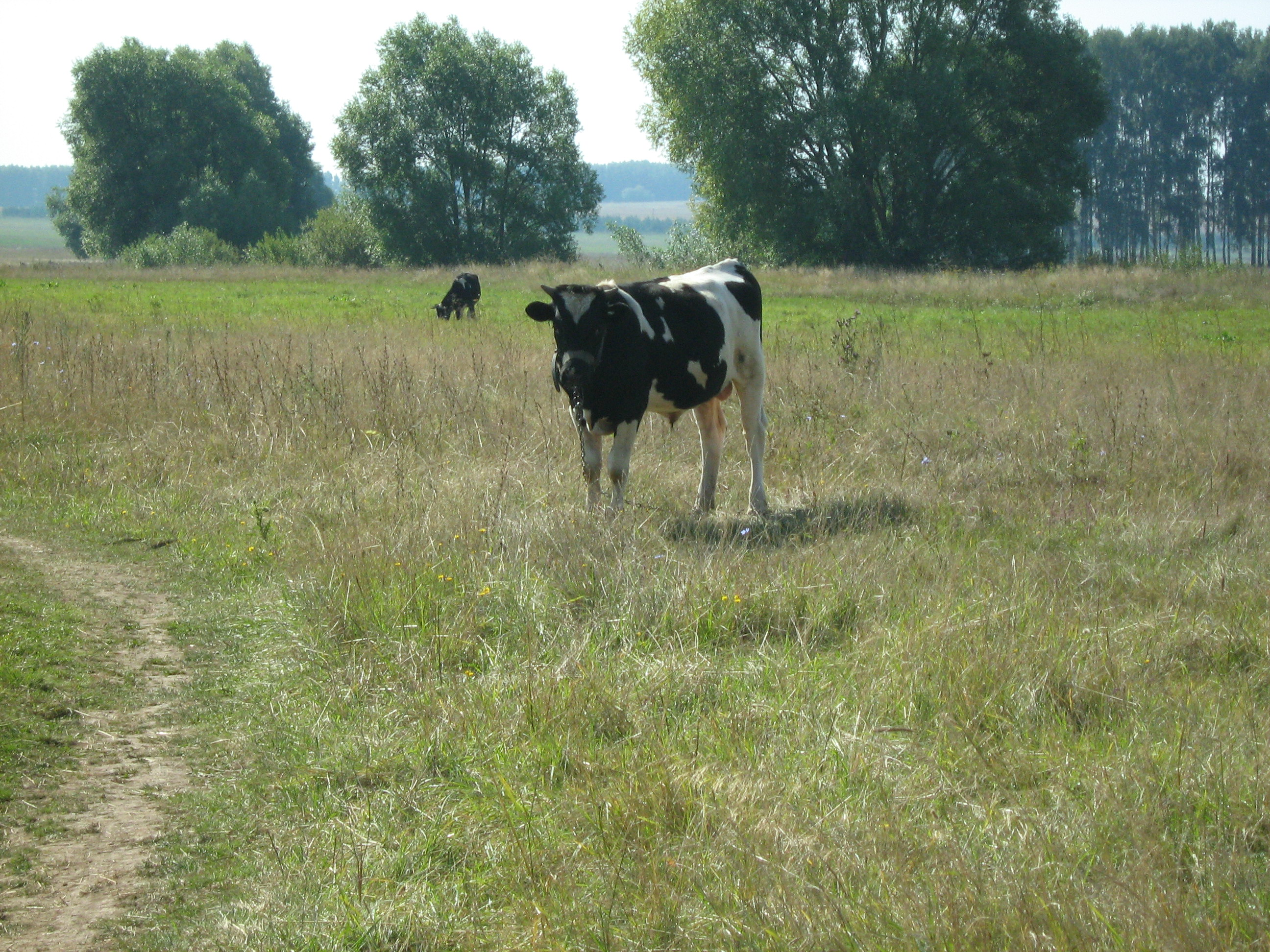

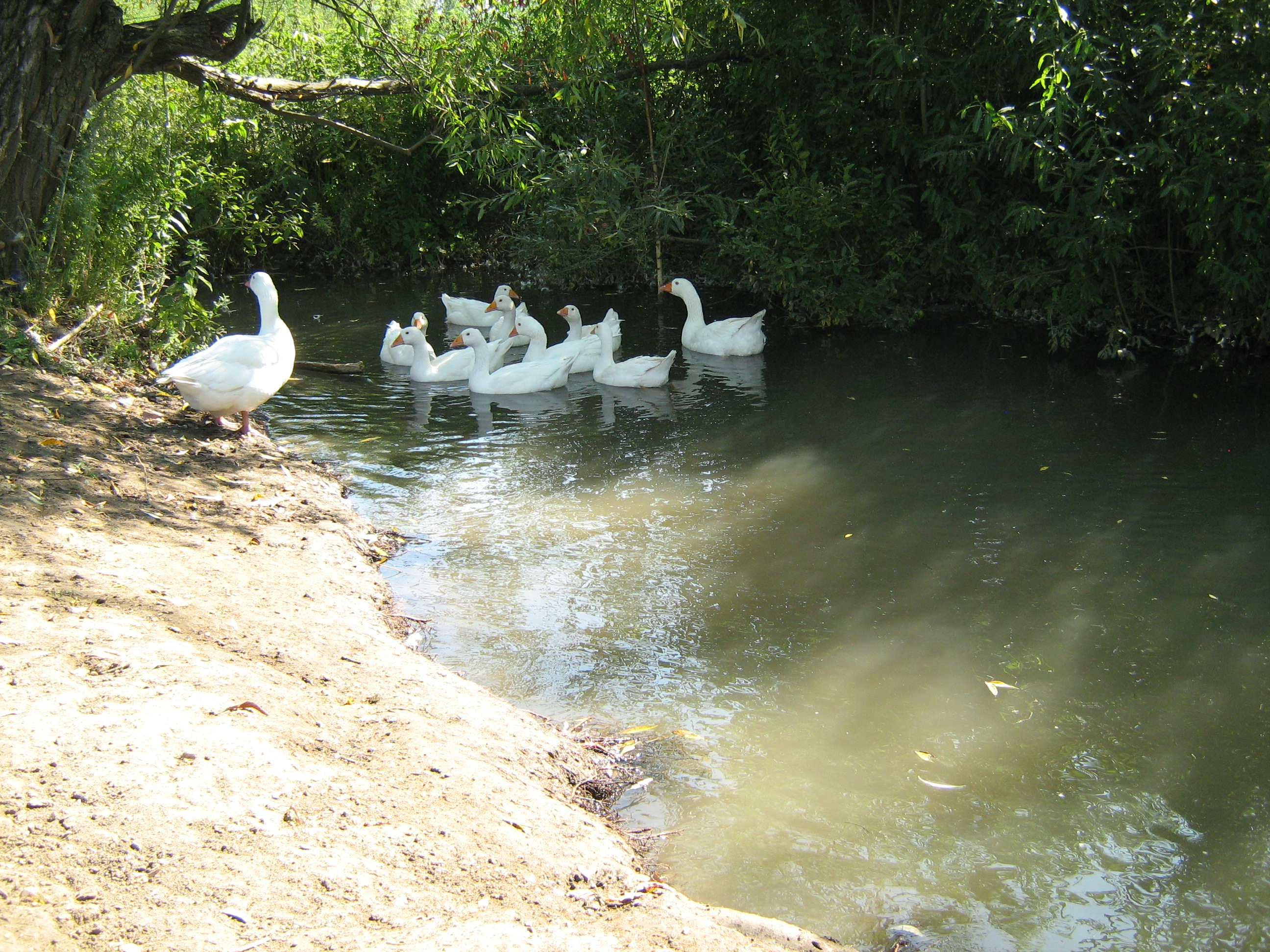

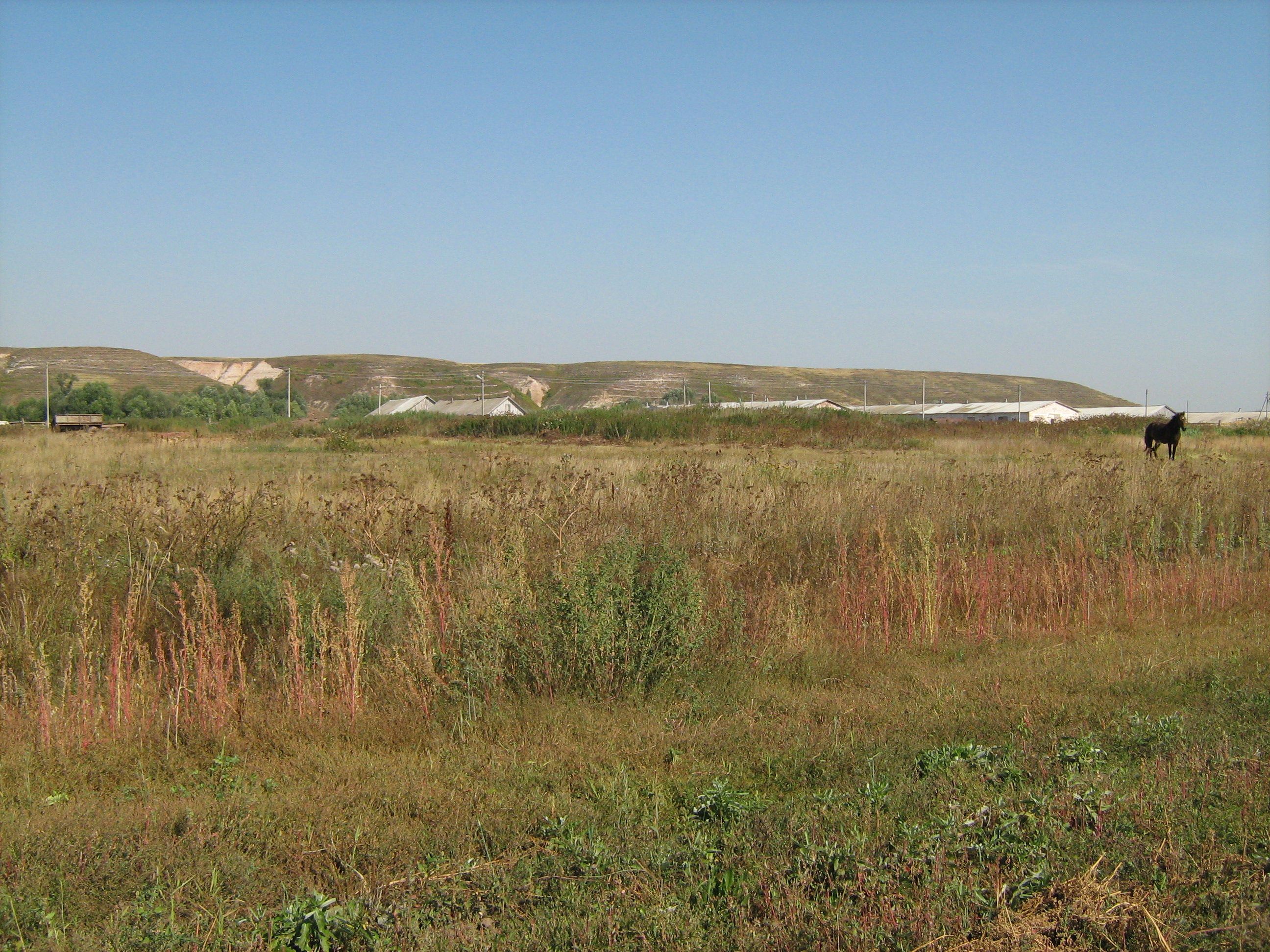

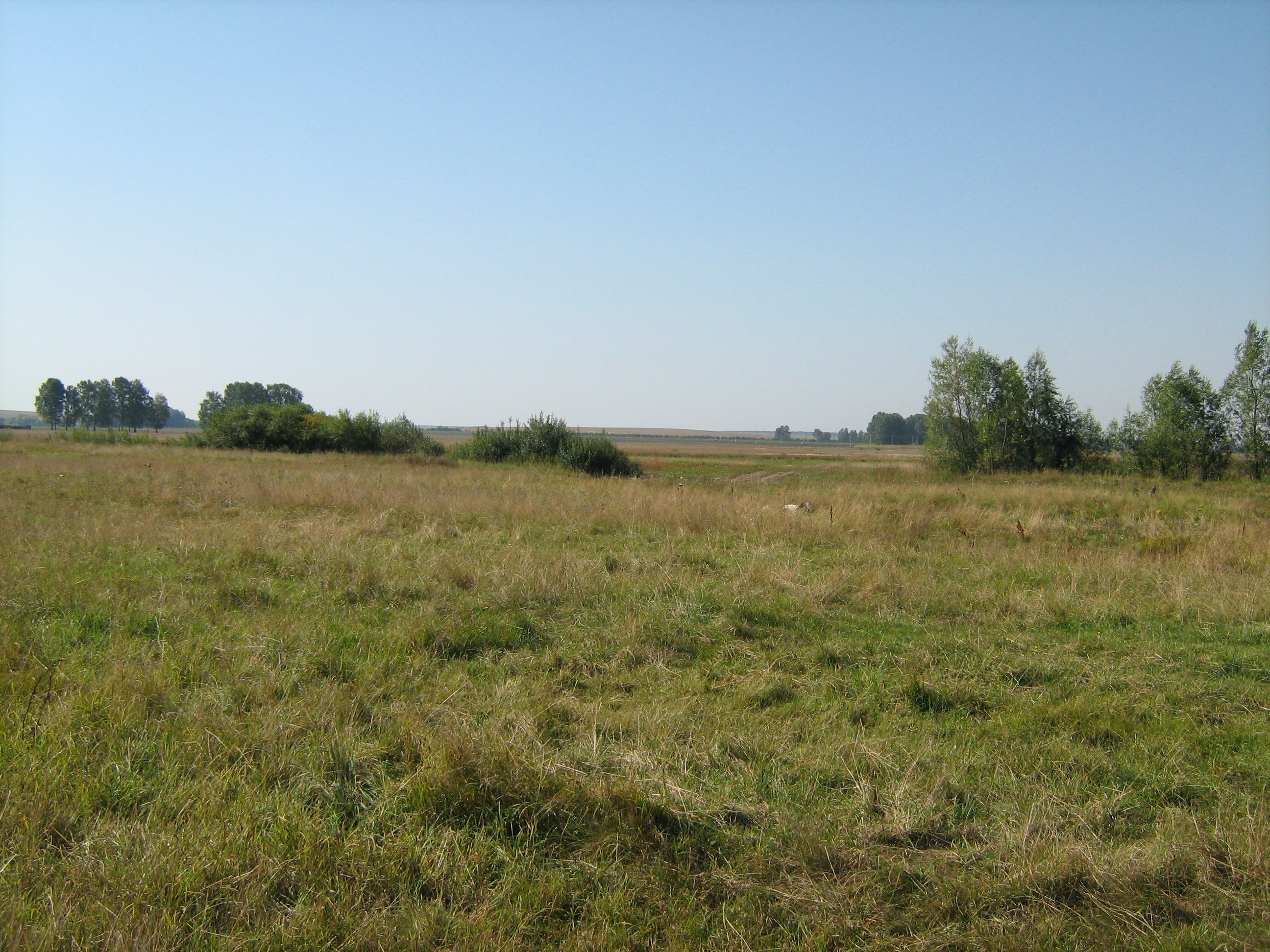

=== Investment potential ===
In 2020, one of the highest unemployment rates in the republic was registered in the Tyulyachinsky district - 0.82%, with an average indicator for the republic of 0.56%. At the same time, in 2017, the district was one of the leaders in the rating of the business climate of Tatarstan, which assessed the mood of entrepreneurs and their relationship with the authorities. In 2019, direct foreign investments in Tyulyachinsky district amounted to $ 32,100.

In 2012, the industrial site Tyulyachi opened in the district. Two years later it already had four occupants, including the Tyulyachinsky pipe plant Policom, specializing in the production of polymer pipes, which attracted investment of 100 million rubles, and a plant for the production plastic products for household and industrial use, Fimako (300 million rubles in investment). In 2020, an industrial and industrial park was opened on the site. For its redevelopment, 53.1 million rubles were allocated from federal and republic budgets and more than 10 million in private investment was attracted. At the moment nine entities are operating in the park, creating more than 300 jobs. It is expected that by 2024 the number of entities operating at the park will increase to 16, potentially doubling the number of jobs they will create.

Since 2014, there has been a plan to build a large-scale plant for the liquefaction of natural gas in Tyulyachi; the agro-industrial Astrakhan company Semiramida became the customer and investor of the project. The estimated cost of the project at that time was estimated at 2.1 billion rubles (at the exchange rate for June 2014). However, the work did not start, at the beginning of 2018 the project of the plant was transferred to the TopGaz company. At the moment, the volume of investment in the project is about 2.9 billion rubles, the plant should be completed in 2021, with a design capacity of 6 tons per hour.

=== Transport ===
The M7 (Volga) highways "Moscow - Kazan - Ufa", "Kazan - Tyulyachi - Bogatye Saby", "Kazan - Tyulyachi - Mamadysh", "Kazan - Naberezhnye Chelny", "Tyulyachi - Arsk", "Tyulyachi" - Abdi ". The nearest railway station is located 39 km away, in the city of Arsk.

== Ecology ==
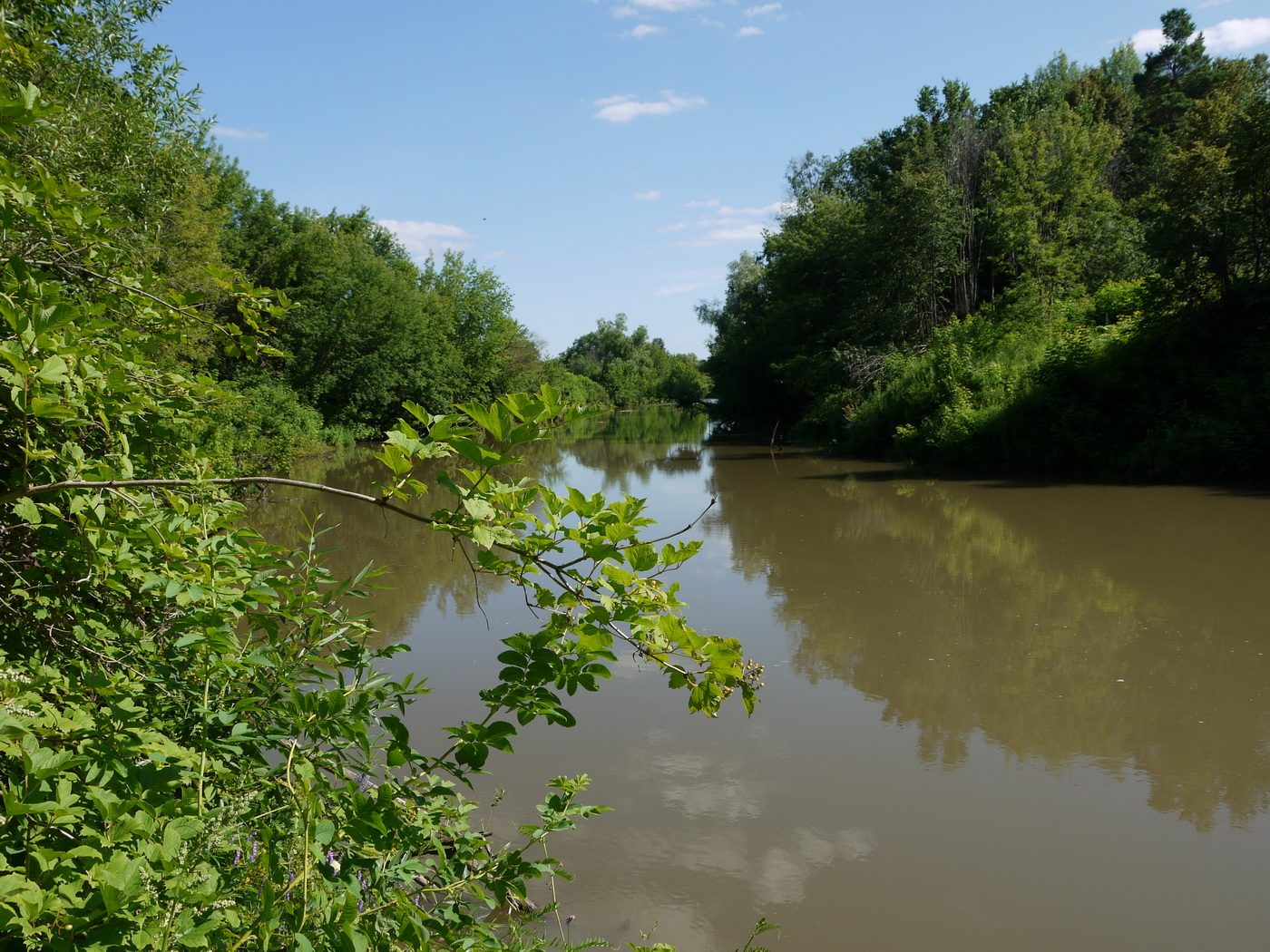
River Myosha

The Myosha river flows through the territory of the Tyulyachinsky District. The terrain of the region is undulating andflat, with deposits of building stone, lime and peat. 1182 different kinds of vascular plants have been observed in the region, some of which are included in the Red Book of Tatarstan.

== Social sphere ==
The network of preschool and secondary education institutions of the district includes 37 schools, 18 preschool institutions, ad three institutions of additional education. In 2017, a new ice palace was opened in the Tyulyachinsky district.

In the village of Tyulyachi there is a cultural monument - the Church of the Intercession of the Theotokos, built at the expense of the landowner N. Aristova in 1771. On the territory of the district there is a museum of local lore, which has more than 4.5 thousand exhibits in its collections, among which a unique object is stored - one of the first phonographs. The museum has a club of folk craftsmen "Tyulyachin masters".
