= Şämärdän =

Şämärdän Шәмәрдән
- selo
- Location within Tatarstan
- Country: Russia
- Region: Tatarstan
- District: Saba District

Population (2021)
  - Total: 5,740
- Time zone: UTC+3:00

Şämärdän (Tatar: Шәмәрдән, romanized: Şämärdän) is a rural locality (a selo) in Saba District, Tatarstan. The population was 5876 as of 2010. Şämärdän is located 22 kilometres (14 mi) from Baylar Sabası, district's administrative centre, and 118 km from Ԛazan, republic's capital, by road. The village was established in 1913/1914. There are 55 streets in the village.
