= Shoshma =

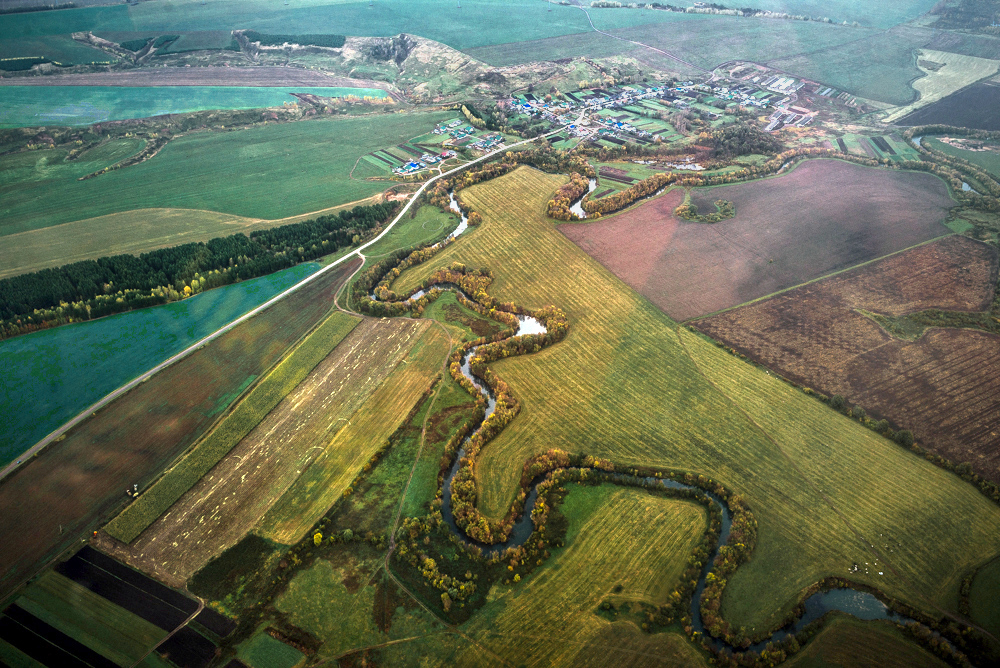

- Vyatka river basin

Location
- Country: Mari El, Tatarstan and Kirov Oblast, Russia

Physical characteristics
- Source
  - location: Maly Kiner, Mari El
- Mouth: Vyatka
  - location: near Malmyzh, Kirov Oblast
  - coordinates: 56°31′45″N 50°44′58″E
- Length: 105 km (65 mi)
- Basin size: 1,885 km^{2} (728 mi^{2})

Basin features
- Progression: Vyatka→ Kama→ Volga→ Caspian Sea

The Shoshma (Russian: Шошма; Tatar: Шушма; Mari: Шошма, Šošma) is a river in Mari El, Tatarstan and Kirov Oblast, Russian Federation, a right-bank tributary of the Vyatka. Its length is 105 kilometres (65 mi), of which 90 kilometres (56 mi) are in Tatarstan, and its drainage basin covers 1,885 square kilometres (728 mi^{2}). It originates near Maly Kiner, Mari El and flows to the Vyatka near Malmyzh, Kirov Oblast.

Major tributaries are the Sarda, Kushket, Arborka, and Kuguborka rivers. The maximal mineralization 500–800 mg/L. The maximal water discharge is 149 cubic metres per second (5,300 cu ft/s) (1980). Drainage is regulated. There are peat deposits in the river valley. Since 1978 it has been protected as a "natural monument of Tatarstan'". The localities of Baltasi and Malmyzh are located on the river.
