= Mamadyshsky District =

Mamadyshsky District Мамадышский район (Russian)
- District

Other transcription(s)
  - Tatar: Мамадыш районы
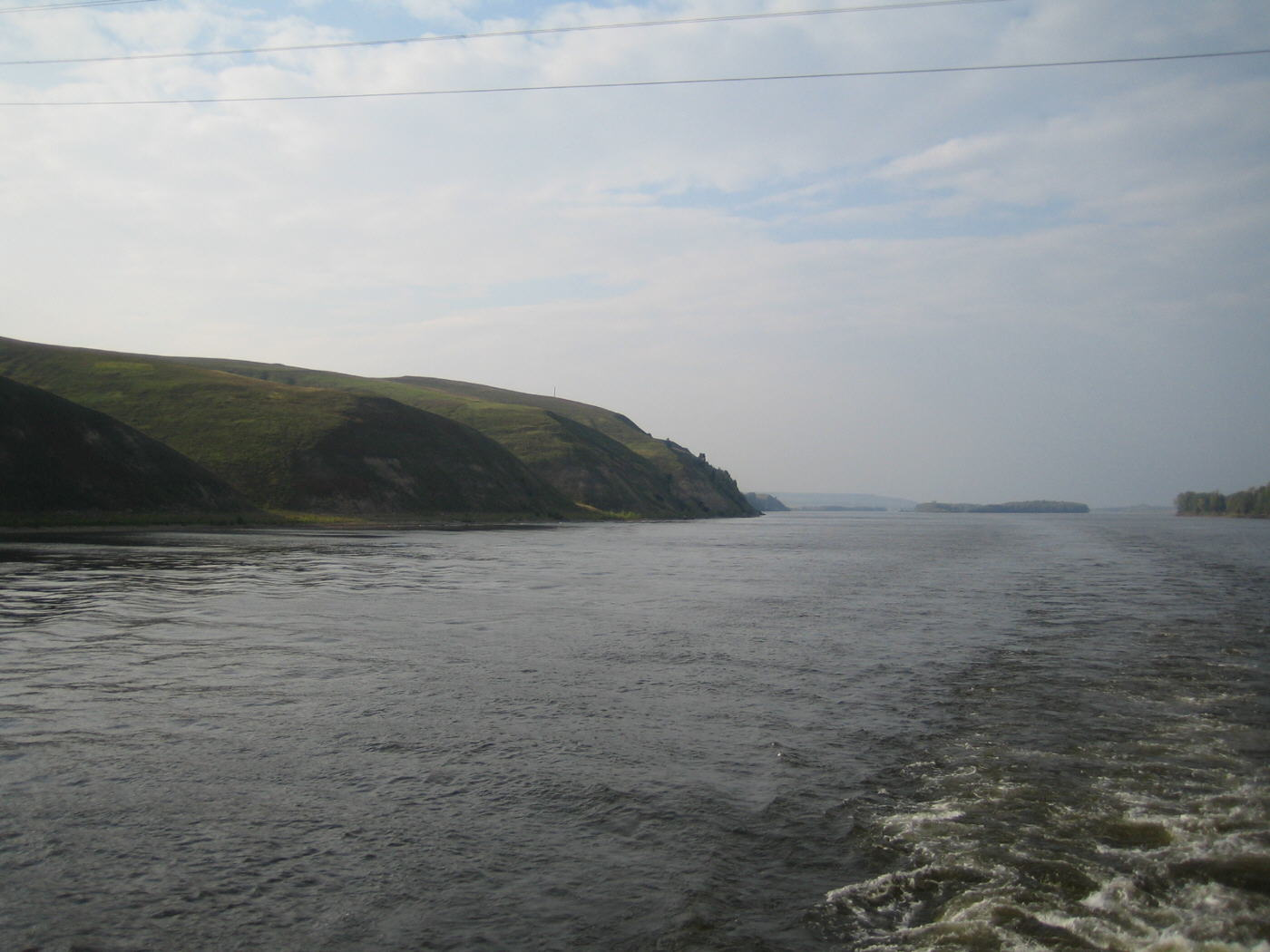
- Vyatka River, Mamadyshsky District

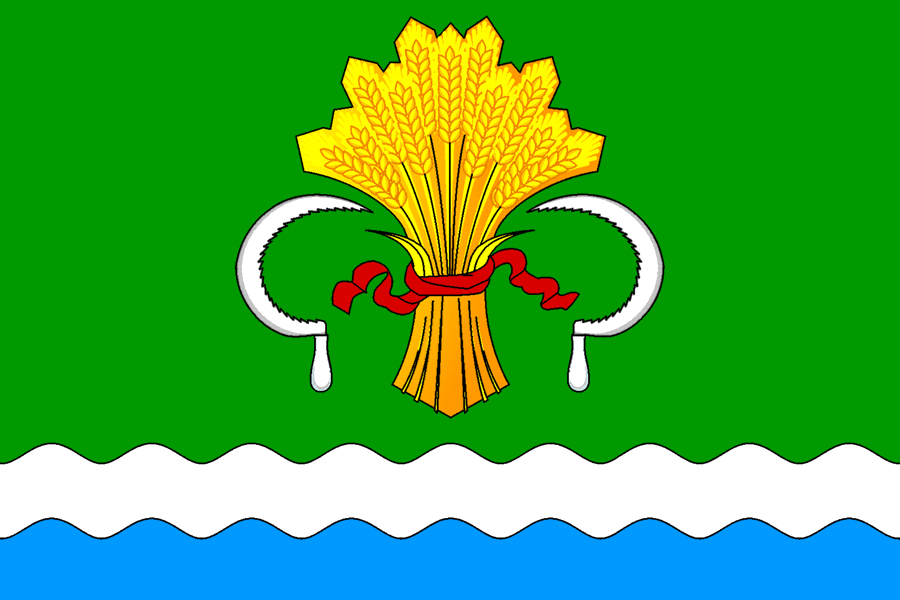
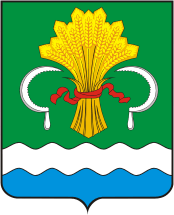
- Flag Coat of arms
- Location of Mamadyshsky District in the Republic of Tatarstan
- Coordinates: 55°45′N 51°08′E
- Country: Russia
- Federal subject: Republic of Tatarstan
- Established: 10 August 1930
- Administrative center: Mamadysh

Area
  - Total: 2,600.7 km^{2} (1,004.1 sq mi)

Population (2010 Census)
  - Total: 45,005
  - Density: 17.305/km^{2} (44.820/sq mi)
  - Urban: 32.1%
  - Rural: 67.9%

Administrative structure
  - Inhabited localities: 1 cities/towns, 128 rural localities

Municipal structure
  - Municipally incorporated as: Mamadyshsky Municipal District
  - Municipal divisions: 1 urban settlements, 28 rural settlements
- Time zone: UTC+3 (MSK)
- OKTMO ID: 92638000
- Website: http://mamadysh.tatarstan.ru/

Mamadyshsky District (Russian: Мамады́шский райо́н; Tatar: Мамадыш районы) is a territorial administrative unit and municipality of the Republic of Tatarstan within the Russian Federation. The district is located in the north of the republic and encompasses an area of 2,600 square kilometers (1,000 sq mi). According to the 2010 census, the municipality had a population of 45,005. The administrative center of the district is the town of Mamadysh, which accounts for 32.1% of the district's total population.

In the 12th century the settlement of Ak Kirmen stood within the boundaries of the current district. In 1930, the modern borders of the Mamadyshsky district were established. The industrial park “Vyatka” and two industrial sites “Selkhoztekhnika” and “Selkhozkhimiya” operate in the region.

== Geography ==
The Mamadyshsky district is located in the north-east of the Republic of Tatarstan, on the eastern part of the Russkaya Plain. It shares borders with the Alabuga special economic zone in the east, the Tyulyachinsky and Sabinsky districts in the west, with the Kukmorsky district in the north, and with Udmurtia in the north-east. The district borders are shaped by the Vyatka River in the east and by the Kama River in the south. A total of 98 km^{2} of the district is covered by various bodies of water. The Mamadyshsky district is located in close proximity to the Kirov region. The length of the territory from north to south is 70 km and from west to east 80 km. The total land area of the district is 2.6 thousand km^{2}. The climate of the region is continental: summer seasons are dry and short, while winters are warm.

== Flag and Coat of Arms ==
In November 2006, the Council of the Mamadyshsky municipal district approved its new heraldic insignia. The modern coat of arms is based on the historical emblem of Mamadysh. The dominant background of the coat of arms is green and symbolizes nature, hope, health and spring. In the center of the canvas there is a golden sheaf of wheat tied with a red ribbon. Two silver sickles on the sides of the sheaves represent the agricultural activities of the area. According to the official interpretation, such a composition indicates the unity of physical forces and spiritual aspirations, as well as the inextricable connection between the inhabitants of rural and urban settlements. In the lower part of the coat of arms there are two wavy lines — silver and blue, symbolizing the Kama, Vyatka and other smaller rivers of the region. The flag of Mamadysh is based on the coat of arms and consists of three horizontal stripes: green one 7/9th of the canvas width; a wavy white stripe of 1/10th of the width and one blue stripe.

== History ==
=== Etymology ===
The name of Mamadysh was first mentioned in archival records dating back to the year 1151, a fact that demonstrates the existence of trade relations between the territory around Mamadysh and the Kievan Rus. The toponym of Mamadysh is often mentioned in local legends associating it with the name of the first settler to these lands: “The settlement of Mamadysh is located on the right bank of the Vyatka River at the confluence of the Oshma River by the old man Mamadysh, who moved here after the ruin of the Bulgar state by Khan Tamerlane at the end of the 14th century (1391)”. This date is considered the official year of origin of the village.

=== 11th-20th Centuries ===
At the beginning of the 12th century, the Bulgar settlement “Ak Kirmen” or “White Fortress” was established on the territory of the modern Mamadysh district. According to historical evidence, this fortress was the center of one of the principalities of Volga Bulgaria. Legend says that the princess of the Kazan Khanate Syuyumbike once stayed there for rest.

In 1552, after the capture of Kazan, the lands of the former Bulgar settlement were incorporated into the Muscovite state. The first Russian settlement in the region was the village of Omar, which still exists today. On July 3, 1613, an official document was signed on the formation of the monastery village of Troitskoe-Mamadysh in the Kazan Voivodeship. The rest of the territory now occupied by the current Mamadyshsky district belonged to the lands of the Zuisky, Moskovsky and Donskoy monasteries and the Kazan bishop's house. In 1743 Asafula Inozemtsev opened the Taishevsky copper smelter in the village of Kukmor which until 1747 was the largest copper smelter in the Volga region. In 1774, a large number of the region's residents joined the insurrectionist detachments of Yemelyan Pugachev during his uprising. Loyal to the crown, Captain Yakov Mikhalchukov suppressed the insurrectionists in Mamadysh, which subsequently had to be rebuilt. On September 28, 1781, by the decree of Catherine the Great, the village of Mamadysh was elevated to the status of a district town within the Kazan Governorate. By 1859, two salt brine refineries, three tanneries, two croupiers, one potash mill, two brick factories and a weaving and bag factory operated in the town. In 1883, a distillery named after Shcherbakov, opened with facilities equipped with imported equipment in a part of the Zaoshminskaya Sloboda. By the beginning of the 20th century, it employed about 100 people.

Mamadysh was one of the battlefields of the Russian Civil War and the town was changed hands several times between the belligerents: in 1917, the Bolsheviks seized power in the town, yet the year 1918 found Mamadysh under occupation by the White Army. After Kolchak entered the territory of Tatarstan, the front line passed along Vyatka and near Mamadysh. The county peasants supplied the battlefield with more than 10,000 carts for the evacuation of vehicles, cargo and property. In May of 1919, hostilities around the county ceased and authority over the county passed into the hands of the Red Army. In 1920, the Mamadyshsky canton was established, which in 1930 was transformed into the Tyuntersky district until it was renamed Baltasinsky district two years later. During The Great Patriotic War many local enterprises supported the front with their products. In 1941, courses for tractor drivers were opened there which trained about 80 female students per year. In 1963, the Baltasinsky district was abolished and its lands were transferred to the Arsky district. However, two years later the borders of the Baltasinsky district were restored and the district received its modern name of Mamadyshsky".

== Administrative and municipal status ==
Within the framework of administrative divisions, the Mamadyshsky district is one of the forty-three districts in the republic. From 2006 to 2010, the district was headed by Rustam Kalimullin, who left his post in 2010 as a result of his appointment as the head of the Vysokogorsky district. Since 2010, the post of head of the Mamadyshsky district has been occupied by Anatoly Ivanov. In 2020, Vladimir Putin awarded Ivanov with the Medal of Merit to the Fatherland (2nd degree). In total, the head of the Mamadyshsky district has been awarded five medals.

As of 2020, 41,611 people lived in the Mamadyshsky district. According to the results of the 2010 census, Tatars made up 76.3% of the district’s population, 20.1% identified as Russians, 1.25% as Udmurts, 1.37% as Mari, 0.1% as Chuvash and 0.1% as Bashkirs.

== Economy ==
=== Industry ===
One of the largest enterprises in the region is the Mamadyshsky spirtzavod (Mamadyshsky distillery) which opened in 1883 and was forced to shut down during the Revolution. In 1936, the plant was reconstructed and the company employed about 150 local residents. As of 2020 the plant is the largest consumer of grain in the republic as part of the Tatspirtprom holding and annually produces up to 7.5 thousand tons of dry feed yeast, which is exported to Germany, Poland, Latvia and Lithuania. In 2016, the management of the holding decided to modernize several factories, including the one at Mamadyshsky in order to increase production volumes. The budget for the equipment modernization at the Mamadyshsky distillery amounted to nearly 1.12 billion rubles. This year, Tatspirtprom's tax contributions amounted to 20.2 billion rubles: in 2016, the holding was the second largest taxpayer in the republic. In 2018, the Mamadyshsky distillery received a quality certificate for its compliance with the GMP+ international feed safety management system.

The Mamadyshsky maslodelno-syrodelnyi kombinat (Butter and Cheese Factory) has been operating since 1974; in 2007, a new production building was built in Mamadyshsky. The enterprise produces milk and dairy products, including 17 various types of cheese and is part of the Azbuka Syra holding. At the end of 2017, the plant's revenue amounted to about 4.8 billion rubles. In 2019, the Dairy Intelligence Agency evaluated TOP-100 milk processors in terms of production volume. The Mamadyshsky Butter and Cheese Factory took 22nd place in this ranking.

In 2020, construction began in the Vyatka industrial park for a new plant named Vyatka Plast which plans to produce plastic dishes. The facility will cover an area of 1.5 km^{2} and construction work is expected to be completed by May 2021. In the period January–September 2020 the value of goods produced and shipped in the region amounded to more than 7.2 billion rubles.

=== Agriculture ===
The agricultural sector in the Mamadyshsky district specializes in the production of grain, as well as various livestock industries including: meat and dairy cattle, pig farming, beekeeping and poultry industries. Wheat, rye, buckwheat, barley, peas and other agricultural crops are cultivated in the region. The district encompasses 132 thousand hectares, 88.8 thousand hectares of this being arable land. Agricultural production is carried out by 15 different enterprises and 53 farms. Large agricultural enterprises include Nokrat, Takanysh and Omara.

The largest agricultural enterprise operating in the district is “APK Prodovolstvennaia programma”. The company purchased 26.3 thousand hectares of the region’s land, which it sows with grain crops for sale and own production. In 2020, APK's harvest amounted to 76 thousand tons. The company also owns a meat processing plant that produces sausages and other meat products as well as a slaughterhouse with a capacity of 10 heads of cattle per hour which opened in 2018 in the village of Otarka. In 2017, tax payments by APK to the republic budget amounted to 20 million rubles. As of 2020, the company had over 24,000 head of cattle. Overall, the gross agricultural output of the region in the period January–June 2020 amounted to more than 1.19 billion rubles.

=== Investment Potential ===
In 2015, the Vyatka industrial park was opened in the Mamadyshsky district. The facility is located near the M7 Volga federal highway and covers an area of 80 hectares. The site was created as part of the federal program to stimulate small and medium-sized businesses and improve investment flows into the region. 314 million rubles were allocated for the construction of the park, of which 80% came from federal funds and 20% from regional sources. In addition to its ready-made infrastructure, the Vyatka industrial park offers its residents such privileges as free land plots during the construction of enterprises, which can later be redeemed at a price of 0.18 rubles per 1 m², and after which the plots are not taxed. Also, residents are offered reduced electricity tariffs. As of 2020, there are 25 residents of the industrial site. In the same year the construction of a strawberry plant was announced with an expected completion date in 2021 supported by the funds of Turkish investors who are expected to contribute up to 130 million rubles. At the second stage, depositors are planning to invest in tomato cultivation and later, in the organization of greenhouses.

As of 2016, the share of small business in the district economy amounted to 29.7% consisting of 244 small enterprises, 786 individual entrepreneurs and 141 peasant farms. For the development of small and medium-sized businesses, industrial sites “Selkhoztekhnika” and “Selkhozkhimiya” operate on the territory of the district, providing services to a total of 20 residents enterprises.

In the period January–June of 2020, the total volume of investment in fixed assets in the district, excluding budgetary funds, amounted to over 1.21 billion rubles.

=== Transport ===
The district is serviced by 1,023 km of roads including part of the federal highway M-7 “Moscow-Ufa”. There are two city routes “Krasnaya Gorka—Dorozhnikov settlement” and “Yuzhny settlement—Severny settlement”, as well as 12 suburban routes. The main bus station is located in the city of Mamadysh. The Vyatka and Kama rivers are navigable and are accessible via a port located in Mamadysh.

== Ecology ==
There are four natural monuments and reserves on the territory of the Mamadyshsky district. The “Sokolsky Forest” occupies an area of 3852 hectares on the banks of the Vyatka and Kama Rivers, and the watershed plateau — Sokolinye Gory — belongs to it. The park is dominated by 30-35 year old pines with a maximum age of 90 years. The natural reserve “Bersut fir trees” is located near the Bersut River, a tributary of the Kama. The total area of the park is 182.8 hectares and a protected species of chipmunks listed in the Red Book is found on its territory. In 2018, this reserve was a site for public outcry as the result of a decision allocating park territory for private construction. As a result the prosecutors office demanded that illegal construction on the site of the natural reserve be stopped. The third natural monument, “Meshebash forestry”, occupies an area of 131.6 hectares near the village of Astana-Elga. It is home to up to 70 species of plants, among which are the round-leaved bell and the common weasel. The fourth monument, extends along the Bersut River for 52.3 km. The river's source is located near the village of Verkhniy Arnyash and its mouth is near the village of Novy Rybno-Slobodsky district.

In the Mamadyshsky district there is a spring “Svyataya Chasha”, which, according to the local legend, appeared near an oak tree, where the icon of St. Nicholas the Wonderworker was later found. Pilgrims came to the spring not only from neighboring villages, but also from Vyatka, Ufa and other regions. In 2012, the site of the spring was repaired and a bath with a chapel was installed here.

== Social Welfare ==
In 2020, the Mamadyshsky district became a part of the tourist project “1001 Pleasure” and the excursion program “Kirmen Zhiena”. Under these programs, guests of the region visit the fortress-fort “Kirmenchuk” and the museum located in the historical center of Mamadysh.

As of 2020, 68 educational institutions operated in the Mamadyshsky district, including one providing instruction in Udmurt and another in Mari as well as agricultural and vocational colleges. The cultural resources in the district include 38 rural houses of culture, 37 rural clubs, the Mamadyshsky District House of Culture, 54 libraries, four museums, a children's art school (with two branches), the 60th Victory Anniversary Park of Culture and Rest, three theaters and four ensembles.

There are 19 cultural heritage sites in the region. These include the remains of ancient settlements, a complex of 27 tombstones from the 14th century, as well as historical buildings such as the Mamadysh town hall and the Gostiny dvor. This later building is the oldest in the city, having been erected in 1785 after Mamadysh received the status of a county town. From 1910 to 1970, the building housed a fire station.

== Bibliography ==
- Akhmetova, R.I. (2012). Istoriia Mamadyshskogo kraia. Uchebnoe posobie [History of the Mamadysh region. Tutorial]. Mamadysh.
- Zigashin, I.I.; Ivanov, D.V.; Tomaeva, I.F. (2015). Ekologicheskii gid po zelenym ugolkam Respubliki Tatarstan [Ecological guide to the nature of the Republic of Tatarstan] (PDF). Kazan: Foliant. Archived from the original (PDF) on January 8, 2021.
