= Malmyzh =

Malmyzh (Russian: Малмыж) is the name of several inhabited localities in Russia.

Urban localities

- Malmyzh, Kirov Oblast, a town in Malmyzhsky District of Kirov Oblast; 56°32′N 50°41′E

Rural localities

- Malmyzh, Amursky District, Khabarovsk Krai, a settlement at the station in Amursky District of Khabarovsk Krai
- Malmyzh, Nanaysky District, Khabarovsk Krai, a selo in Nanaysky District of Khabarovsk Krai
