= Tyulyachi =

Rural locality in Tatarstan, Russia

Coordinates: 55°53′23″N 50°14′09″E

Tyulyachi (Russian: Тюлячи, Tatar: Теләче) is a rural locality (a selo) and the administrative center of Tyulyachinsky District of the Republic of Tatarstan, Russia. Population: 3,265 (2010 census); 2,943 (2002 census);
