= Mamadysh =

Town in the Republic of Tatarstan, Russia

Mamadysh Мамадыш
- Town

Other transcription(s)
  - Tatar: Мамадыш
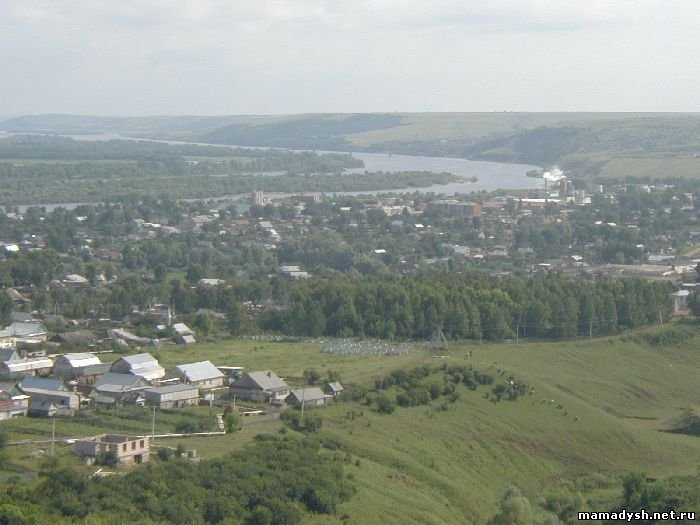
- View of Mamadysh and the Vyatka River

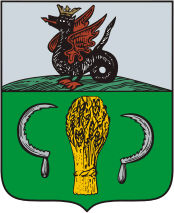
- Coat of arms
- Interactive map of Mamadysh
- Location of Mamadysh Mamadysh (Tatarstan)
- Coordinates: 55°42′47″N 51°24′38″E
- Country: Russia
- Federal subject: Tatarstan
- Administrative district: Mamadyshsky District
- Founded: end of the 14th–beginning of the 15th century
- Town status since: 1781

Area
  - Total: 12.6 km^{2} (4.9 sq mi)
- Elevation: 60 m (200 ft)

Population (2010 Census)
  - Total: 14,435
  - Estimate (2021): 15,726 (+8.9%)
  - Density: 1,150/km^{2} (2,970/sq mi)

Administrative status
  - Capital of: Mamadyshsky District

Municipal status
  - Municipal district: Mamadyshsky Municipal District
  - Urban settlement: Mamadysh Urban Settlement
  - Capital of: Mamadyshsky Municipal District, Mamadysh Urban Settlement
- Time zone: UTC+3 (MSK)
- Postal codes: 422190–422192, 422199
- OKTMO ID: 92638101001

Mamadysh (Russian: Мамады́ш; Tatar: Мамадыш) is a town and the administrative center of Mamadyshsky District in the Republic of Tatarstan, Russia, located on the Vyatka River (Kama's tributary), 167 kilometers (104 mi) from the republic's capital of Kazan. As of the 2010 Census, its population was 14,435.

== History ==
Known since the end of the 14th–the beginning of the 15th century, it has been known as the selo of Troitskoye (Троицкое) from the beginning of the 17th century. Town status was granted to it in 1781. It served as the administrative center of a kanton in 1920–1930 and as the administrative center of a district since 1930.

== Administrative and municipal status ==
Within the framework of administrative divisions, Mamadysh serves as the administrative center of Mamadyshsky District, to which it is directly subordinated. As a municipal division, the town of Mamadysh is incorporated within Mamadyshsky Municipal District as Mamadysh Urban Settlement.

== Economy ==
As of 1997, industrial enterprises in the town included a wood-processing factory, a forestry farm, a cotton mill, a brick factory, a butter factory, and a distillery. The nearest railway station is Kukmor on the Kazan–Agryz line, located 80 kilometers (50 mi) southeast.

== Demographics ==
Mamadysh population
- 2010 Census: 14,435
- 2002 Census: 13,509
- 1989 Census: 11,835
- 1979 Census: 10,326

As of 1989, the population was ethnically mostly Tatar (59.0%) and Russian (39.4%).
