= Bogatye Saby =

Bogatye Saby Богатые Сабы
- Urban-type settlement

Other transcription(s)
  - Tatar: Байлар Сабасы
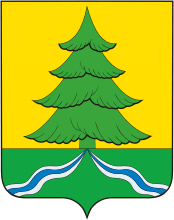
- Coat of arms
- Interactive map of Bogatye Saby
- Location of Bogatye Saby Bogatye Saby (Tatarstan)
- Coordinates: 56°01′N 50°27′E
- Country: Russia
- Federal subject: Tatarstan
- Administrative district: Sabinsky District
- Founded: during the Khanate of Kazan period
- Urban-type settlement status since: 2004
- Elevation: 152 m (499 ft)

Population (2010 Census)
  - Total: 7,671
  - Estimate (2021): 8,828 (+15.1%)

Administrative status
  - Capital of: Sabinsky District

Municipal status
  - Municipal district: Sabinsky Municipal District
  - Urban settlement: Bogatye Saby Urban Settlement
  - Capital of: Sabinsky Municipal District, Bogatye Saby Urban Settlement
- Time zone: UTC+3 (MSK)
- Postal codes: 422060, 422068, 422074, 422075, 422079, 422086, 422087
- OKTMO ID: 92652151051

Bogatye Saby (Russian: Богатые Сабы; Tatar: Байлар Сабасы) is an urban locality (an urban-type settlement) and the administrative center of Sabinsky District in the Republic of Tatarstan, Russia, located on the Saba River (Myosha's basin), 98 kilometers (61 mi) from the republic's capital of Kazan. As of the 2010 Census, its population was 7,671.

== History ==
It was established during the Khanate of Kazan period. Bogatye Saby served as the district administrative center since 1930. Urban-type settlement status was granted to it in 2004.

== Administrative and municipal status ==
Within the framework of administrative divisions, the urban-type settlement of Bogatye Saby serves as the administrative center of Sabinsky District, of which it is a part. As a municipal division, Bogatye Saby, together with one rural locality (the village of Sredniye Saby), is incorporated within Sabinsky Municipal District as Bogatye Saby Urban Settlement.

== Economy ==
As of 1997, industrial enterprises in Bogatye Saby included a variety of companies serving agricultural needs. The nearest railway station is Shemordan on the Kazan–Agryz line, 22 kilometers (14 mi) north of Bogatye Saby.

== Demographics ==
Bogatye Saby population
- 2010 Census: 7,671
- 2002 Census: 7,196
- 1989 Census: 5,608
- 1979 Census: 4,537

As of 1992, the majority of the population is Tatar.
