= Baltasi =

Baltasi Балтаси
- Urban-type settlement

Other transcription(s)
  - Tatar: Балтач
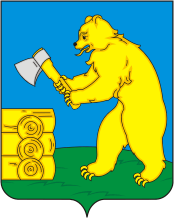
- Coat of arms
- Interactive map of Baltasi
- Location of Baltasi Baltasi (Tatarstan)
- Coordinates: 56°21′N 50°12′E
- Country: Russia
- Federal subject: Tatarstan
- Administrative district: Baltasinsky District
- Founded: beginning of the 17th century
- Urban-type settlement status since: 2004
- Elevation: 104 m (341 ft)

Population (2010 Census)
  - Total: 7,711
  - Estimate (2021): 8,180 (+6.1%)

Administrative status
  - Capital of: Baltasinsky District

Municipal status
  - Municipal district: Baltasinsky Municipal District
  - Urban settlement: Baltasi Urban Settlement
  - Capital of: Baltasinsky Municipal District, Baltasi Urban Settlement
- Time zone: UTC+3 (MSK)
- Postal codes: 422250, 422279
- OKTMO ID: 92615151051

Baltasi (Russian: Балтаси́; Tatar: Балтач) is an urban locality (an urban-type settlement) and the administrative center of Baltasinsky District in the Republic of Tatarstan, Russia, located on the Shoshma River (right tributary of the Vyatka), 106 kilometers (66 mi) from the republic's capital of Kazan. As of the 2010 Census, its population was 7,711.

== History ==
It was established in the beginning of the 17th century. Baltasi served as the district administrative center in 1932–1963, and again since 1965. Urban-type settlement status was granted to it in 2004.

== Administrative and municipal status ==
Within the framework of administrative divisions, the urban-type settlement of Baltasi serves as the administrative center of Baltasinsky District, of which it is a part. As a municipal division, Baltasi, together with three rural localities, is incorporated within Baltasinsky Municipal District as Baltasi Urban Settlement.

== Economy ==
As of 1997, industrial enterprises in Baltasi included a butter factory and a fur factory; agriculture was also developed. The nearest railway station is Shemordan on the Kazan–Agryz line, 25 kilometers (16 mi) northwest of Baltasi.

== Demographics ==
Baltasi population
- 2010 Census: 7,711
- 2002 Census: 6,996
- 1989 Census: 5,064
- 1979 Census: 3,924

In 1992, the majority of the population was Tatar.
