= Kukmor =

Kukmor Кукмор
- Urban-type settlement

Other transcription(s)
  - Tatar: Кукмара
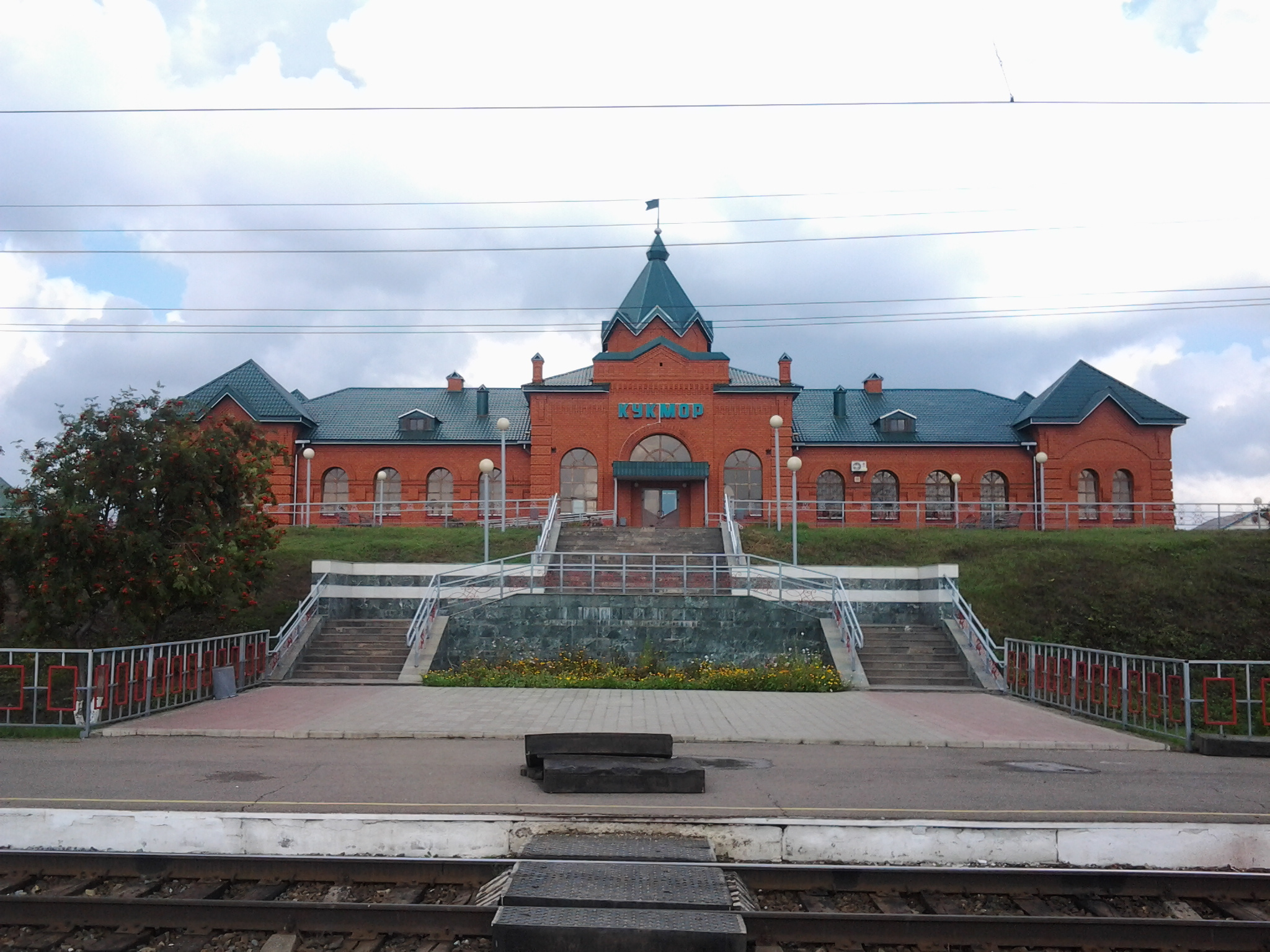
- Kukmor railway station
- Interactive map of Kukmor
- Location of Kukmor Kukmor (Tatarstan)
- Coordinates: 56°11′N 50°53′E
- Country: Russia
- Federal subject: Tatarstan
- Administrative district: Kukmorsky District
- Founded: 2nd quarter of the 18th century
- Urban-type settlement status since: 1928

Population (2010 Census)
  - Total: 16,918
  - Estimate (2021): 17,886 (+5.7%)

Administrative status
  - Capital of: Kukmorsky District

Municipal status
  - Municipal district: Kukmorsky Municipal District
  - Urban settlement: Kukmor Urban Settlement
  - Capital of: Kukmorsky Municipal District, Kukmor Urban Settlement
- Time zone: UTC+3 (MSK)
- Postal codes: 422110–422112, 422139
- OKTMO ID: 92633151051

Kukmor (Russian: Ку́кмор; Tatar: Кукмара) is a city and the administrative center of Kukmorsky District in the Republic of Tatarstan, Russia, located on the Nurminka River (in the Vyatka's basin), near the border with Kirov Oblast, 120 kilometers (75 mi) from the republic's capital of Kazan. As of the 2021 Census, its population was 17,886.

== History ==
It was established in the second quarter of the 18th century as a wool and wood artisan center and was granted urban-type settlement status in 1928. It serves as a district administrative center since 1930.

== Administrative and municipal status ==
Within the framework of administrative divisions, the urban-type settlement of Kukmor serves as the administrative center of Kukmorsky District, of which it is a part. As a municipal division, Kukmor is incorporated within Kukmorsky Municipal District as Kukmor Urban Settlement.

== Economy ==
As of 1997, Kukmor's industrial facilities included several light and food industry enterprises, as well as a kitchenware plant and a brick factory.

Kukmor railway station lies on the Kazan–Agryz line.

== Demographics ==
Kukmor population
- 2010 Census: 16,918
- 2002 Census: 16,764
- 1989 Census: 14,731
- 1979 Census: 13,173

As of 1989, the population was mostly Tatar (77.9%), Russian (11.2%), Udmurt (9.2%), and Mari (1.0%).
