= List of World Heritage Sites in Russia =

Location of UNESCO World Heritage Sites in the European part of Russia.
Location of UNESCO World Heritage Sites in the Asian part of Russia.

The United Nations Educational, Scientific and Cultural Organization (UNESCO) World Heritage Sites are places of importance to cultural or natural heritage as described in the UNESCO World Heritage Convention, established in 1972. Cultural heritage consists of monuments (such as architectural works, monumental sculptures, or inscriptions), groups of buildings, and sites (including archaeological sites). Natural features (consisting of physical and biological formations), geological and physiographical formations (including habitats of threatened species of animals and plants), and natural sites which are important from the point of view of science, conservation or natural beauty, are defined as natural heritage. The Soviet Union ratified the convention on 12 October 1988. The first five sites in the Soviet Union were inscribed to the list at the 14th session of the UNESCO World Heritage Committee, held in Banff, Alberta, Canada, in December 1990. Of these five, three are located in the present-day Russian Federation (or Russia): the monuments of Saint Petersburg (then called Leningrad), Kizhi Pogost, and Moscow Kremlin and Red Square; the other two are Itchan Kala (Uzbek SSR) and Saint-Sophia Cathedral and Related Monastic Buildings, Kiev-Pechersk Lavra (Ukrainian SSR).

As of 2025, there are 33 World Heritage Sites in Russia, with a further 32 sites on the tentative list. The most recent site listed was the Rock Paintings of Shulgan-Tash Cave, in 2025. There are twenty-one cultural sites and eleven natural. Four sites are transnational. The Curonian Spit is shared with Lithuania, the Landscapes of Dauria and Uvs Nuur Basin are shared with Mongolia, and the Struve Geodetic Arc is shared with nine European countries.

== World Heritage Sites ==
UNESCO lists sites under ten criteria; each entry must meet at least one of the criteria. Criteria i through vi are cultural, and vii through x are natural.

* Transnational site

World Heritage Sites
Site	Image	Location	Year listed	UNESCO data	Description
Historic Centre of Saint Petersburg and Related Groups of Monuments	Baroque palace with green and gold facade and a Russian flag on the top	Saint Petersburg	1990	540; i, ii, iv, vi (cultural)	Saint Petersburg was conceived by Tsar Peter the Great as a new capital and a port city at the banks of the Neva River, at the Gulf of Finland. The city was constructed in the early 18th century on a difficult terrain of marshes, peatlands, and rocks. The World Heritage Site comprises the historic centre of the city with its Baroque and Neoclassical architecture, as well as surrounding monuments and palaces, such as those in Pushkin and Petergof. Notable buildings in the city include the Winter Palace (pictured, home of the Hermitage Museum), the Admiralty, and the Marble Palace. In the 20th century, the city was the site of the October Revolution and the Siege of Leningrad during World War II.
Kizhi Pogost	Two old wooden churches and a clock tower	Karelia	1990	544; i, iv, v (cultural)	The architectural ensemble of the Kizhi Pogost (enclosure) on the Kizhi Island in the Lake Onega comprises two wooden churches from the 18th century (the Church of the Transfiguration and the Church of the Intercession) and a clock tower from 1862. They were built in a unique artistic style and represent a culmination of Russian carpenter techniques. Although the buildings have seen periodic repairs, they have not been significantly reconstructed.
Kremlin and Red Square, Moscow	Saint Basil's Cathedral and people in front	Moscow	1990	545; i, ii, iv, vi (cultural)	The Moscow Kremlin is the oldest part of Moscow, first mentioned in 1147. In the 13th century, it served as the seat of the Grand Duchy of Moscow and a religious centre. The walls and the towers were constructed in the late 15th and early 16th century, as well as the churches that were designed by invited Italian architects and show influences of the Italian Renaissance. The Assumption Cathedral was the site of coronations and the Cathedral of the Archangel served as the burial site of Russian princes and tsars. Civic buildings were constructed in the 18th and 19th centuries. Red Square is located outside the Kremlin walls. Saint Basil's Cathedral, located at the end of Red Square, is pictured.
Historic Monuments of Novgorod and Surroundings	A red brick fortress above a river	Novgorod Oblast	1992	604; ii, iv, vi (cultural)	Novgorod was the first capital of Kievan Rus' in the 9th century and the capital of the Novgorod Republic from the 12th to the 15th centuries. Located at the intersection of trade routes linking Northern Europe with Central Asia and Byzantine Empire, the city grew to one of the most important centres of Russian art and culture, as well as a spiritual centre. The majority of the preserved monuments in the city, such as churches and monasteries, are from the Novgorod Republic period. The Kremlin is pictured.
Cultural and Historic Ensemble of the Solovetsky Islands	An orthodox monastery on an island	Arkhangelsk Oblast	1992	632; iv (cultural)	Six islands of the archipelago in the White Sea have been inhabited at least since the 5th century BCE. A fortified Solovetsky Monastery was founded in the 1430s and remained active until the 1920s when it was converted into a prison camp under the Gulag system. The prison camp closed in 1939 and the complex has since returned to the Orthodox church. The World Heritage Site comprises the monastery complex, a former monastic village, monastic cells and hermitages, prehistoric sites, memorial sites of the prison camp, and the surrounding cultural landscape shaped by people living in remote and harsh conditions of the North.
White Monuments of Vladimir and Suzdal	An orthodox church with green and golden domes and a building in red brick	Vladimir Oblast	1992	633; i, ii, iv (cultural)	Vladimir and Suzdal were the main towns of the Vladimir-Suzdal principality in the 12th and 13th centuries. The World Heritage Site comprises the monuments in a unique architectural style developed in the region. The monuments are the Cathedral of the Assumption, the Cathedral of Saint Demetrius, and the Golden Gate in Vladimir, the Princely Castle and the Church of the Intercession on the Nerl in Bogolyubovo, Suzdal Kremlin, the Cathedral of the Nativity, and the Monastery of Our Savior and St Euthymius (pictured) in Suzdal, and the Church of Sts Boris and Gleb in Kideksha.
Architectural Ensemble of the Trinity Sergius Lavra in Sergiev Posad	An orthodox monastery complex with several domes	Moscow Oblast	1993	657; ii, iv (cultural)	The monastery in Sergiev Posad is the most important Russian monastery and the spiritual centre of the Russian Orthodox Church, as well as the seat of the Patriarch. It was founded in 1337 and developed through centuries. The Trinity Cathedral dates from 1422 and houses Andrei Rublev's most famous icon, The Trinity. The Assumption Cathedral, from the second half of the 16th century, houses the tomb of Tsar Boris Godunov and his family. The complex is surrounded by thick defensive walls that protected it during the Polish-Lithuanian siege of 1610.
Church of the Ascension, Kolomenskoye	A church in white stone	Moscow	1994	634rev; ii (cultural)	The Church of the Ascension was built in 1532 to commemorate the birth of the future Tsar Ivan the Terrible. The church is significant because of its tented roof built in stone, an architectural novelty in Russian architecture; such roofs were previously constructed in wooden structures. The roof rises from an octagonal base and features several decorative elements called kokoshniks. The church had a strong influence on the architecture of Russian churches until the middle of the 17th century.
Virgin Komi Forests	Forest, river and mountains	Komi Republic	1995	719; vii, ix (natural)	Virgin forests of this World Heritage Site cover 32,000 square kilometres (12,000 sq mi) in the Ural Mountains. They consist of boreal forest (taiga), tundra, and alpine tundra. The most common tree species are conifers, aspens, and birches. There are also extensive peatlands.
Lake Baikal	A rocky islet on the lake	Irkutsk Oblast, Buryatia	1996	754; vii, viii, ix, x (natural)	At a depth of 1,700 metres (5,600 ft), Lake Baikal is the deepest lake in the world and contains about 20% of world's unfrozen fresh water. It is also the oldest lake in the world, with an age of 25 million years. Due to its characteristics, it is home to a unique combination of freshwater flora and fauna, with many endemic species.
Volcanoes of Kamchatka	A snow covered volcano	Kamchatka Krai	1996	765bis; vii, viii, ix, x (natural)	The Kamchatka Peninsula contains a large density of active volcanoes and associated volcanic features, there are also many glaciers. The area is home to species such as sea otter, brown bear, white-tailed eagle, and Steller's sea eagle. The rivers are spawning areas for salmonid species. The boundaries of the property were expanded in 2001 to include six areas in total. Klyuchevskaya Sopka volcano is pictured.
Golden Mountains of Altai	Plains and snow-covered mountains	Altai Republic	1998	768rev; x (natural)	This site comprises the Altai and Katun Natural Reserves, Lake Teletskoye, Belukha Mountain, and the Ukok Plateau. The area is important in view of biodiversity, with altitudinal vegetation zones spanning from steppe, forest steppe, mixed forest, to subalpine and alpine vegetation. It is also home to snow leopard.
Historic and Architectural Complex of the Kazan Kremlin	Kremlin with towers and minarets above a river	Tatarstan	2000	980; ii, iii, iv (cultural)	Tsar Ivan the Terrible conquered the city of Kazan from the Khanate of Kazan (successors to the Golden Horde) in 1552 and built the Kremlin upon the site of a Tatar fortress. The buildings in the citadel, most of them erected between the 16th and the 19th centuries, reflect the interaction of Russian and Tatar influences, as well as Christian and Muslim faiths. The Kul Sharif Mosque is a new structure, constructed in the 21st century on the site of an earlier mosque.
Western Caucasus	Mountain scenery	Krasnodar Krai	1999	900; ix, x (natural)	This site comprises seven properties (including the Caucasus Nature Reserve) in the western part of the Caucasus mountains, that represent one of the few mountain forest areas that have not been significantly modified by human activities. They contain a wide variety of ecosystems from lowlands to subalpine zone. They are home to several animal and plant species and are the site of reintroduction of the mountain subspecies of the European bison.
Ensemble of the Ferapontov Monastery	Monastery with several towers	Vologda Oblast	2000	982; i, iv (cultural)	The monastery was founded by Saint Ferapont in 1398 in the inhospitable Russian North. The buildings date from the 15th to the 17th century, with a stone wall added in the 19th century. The monastery is a prime example of a Russian Orthodox monastic community from the period, and has been well preserved. The Cathedral of the Nativity of the Virgin (built in 1490 by masters from Rostov) has interior walls covered by frescos by master Dionisius.
Curonian Spit*	Sandy dune, partially covered by forest	Kaliningrad Oblast	2000	994; v (cultural)	The Curonian Spit, a 98-kilometre (61 mi) long sandy dune (a spit) that separates the Curonian Lagoon from the Baltic Sea, has been inhabited since prehistoric times. Intense logging activities in the 17th and 18th centuries resulted in the dunes moving towards the Lagoon, burying the oldest settlements in the process. Dune stabilization work started in the 19th century and is still ongoing. It includes building a protective dune ridge, as well as planting trees and hedges. In time, some of the ancient fishermen villages have been transformed into tourist resorts, with lighthouses, piers, churches, schools, and villas. The area is also important for its sand flora and fauna, and as a bird migration path. The northern part of the Spit is in Lithuania, while the southern part is in Kaliningrad Oblast in Russia.
Central Sikhote-Alin	Mountain scenery with forests and rivers	Primorsky Krai	2001	766bis; x (natural)	This site comprises three properties in the Sikhote-Alin mountain range: Sikhote-Alin Nature Reserve, Goralij Zoological Preserve, and the Bikin River Valley (added as an extension in 2018, pictured). The temperate forests represent a unique meeting point between the taiga and the subtropics, and are home to species such as the Siberian tiger, Himalayan black bear, Siberian musk deer, wolverine, and sable.
Uvs Nuur Basin*	Shallow lake with red plants and hills in the background	Tuva	2003	769rev; ix, x (natural)	This transnational site comprises seven properties in Russia and five in Mongolia. The Uvs Nuur Basin is a large endorheic basin that drains into the large, shallow, and very saline Uvs Lake. The basin contains a wide variety of habitats, including wetlands, steppe, different types of forests, fresh and saltwater ecosystems, as well as mountain tundra. The area is home to several bird species, snow leopard, Mongolian gerbil, argali, and Siberian ibex.
Citadel, Ancient City and Fortress Buildings of Derbent	Massive stone walls and a gate	Dagestan	2003	1070; iii, iv (cultural)	Derbent, the oldest city in Russia, is located on a narrow plain between the Caspian Sea and the Caucasus mountains. Due to its strategic position between Europe and Asia, defensive structures were built already in the first millennium BCE to control the passage. Two parallel walls were built in the 5th and 6th century CE by the Sassanian Empire, parts of them surviving to the present day. The citadel and the city that developed between the walls were shaped by the Arab, Seljuk, Mongol, Timurid, and Safavid rule. The area came under the Russian Empire in the 19th century and gradually lost its military function.
Natural System of Wrangel Island Reserve	Polar landscape with a river and mountains	Chukotka Autonomous Okrug	2004	1023rev; ix, x (natural)	Wrangel Island is located in the Arctic Ocean between the Chukchi Sea and East Siberian Sea. As it was not covered by ice during the Quaternary glaciation, it preserved a large number of plant communities that were otherwhere disrupted by ice, and keeps the highest biodiversity of all Arctic islands. It was also the site of the last known surviving woolly mammoths. In addition to the main island, the site also includes the smaller Herald Island and the surrounding waters. The area is home to seabirds, snow geese, and a large walrus colony, and is a major feeding ground for gray whales.
Ensemble of the Novodevichy Convent	A walled monastery with red and white towers with golden domes	Moscow	2004	1097; i, iv, vi (cultural)	The monastery was founded in the 1520s. The complex was constructed in the 16th and 17th centuries in the Muscovite Baroque style, and is the representative example of the style that was popular in the region in that period. It was closely linked to the royal family, as the chosen convent for women of aristocratic and wealthy families who became nuns, as well as the burial site for the nobles. The convent is surrounded by walls that were, at the time of construction, integrated into Moscow's defenses.
Historical Centre of the City of Yaroslavl	A church with a red facade and other buildings in snow	Yaroslavl Oblast	2005	1170; ii, iv (cultural)	The city of Yaroslavl is located at the confluence of the Volga and Kotorosl rivers. Founded in the 11th century as a small wooden fortress, it developed into a strong commercial centre after being incorporated into the Grand Duchy of Moscow in 1463. Several churches from the 16th and 17th centuries are preserved. Following the town-planning reform of Empress Catherine the Great at the end of the 18th century, Yaroslavl's centre was redesigned in a Neoclassical style with a radial urban plan.
Struve Geodetic Arc*	Struve Geodetic Arc memorial tablet on a stone monument	Leningrad Oblast	2005	1187; ii, iii, vi (cultural)	The Struve Geodetic Arc is a series of triangulation points, stretching over a distance of 2,820 kilometres (1,750 mi) from Hammerfest in Norway to the Black Sea. The points were set up in a survey by the astronomer Friedrich Georg Wilhelm von Struve who first carried out an accurate measurement of a long segment of a meridian, which helped to establish the size and shape of the Earth. Originally, there were 265 station points. The World Heritage Site includes 34 points in ten countries (North to South: Norway, Sweden, Finland, Russia, Estonia, Latvia, Lithuania, Belarus, Moldova, Ukraine), two of which are in Russia, on the island of Gogland.
Putorana Plateau	Landscape with forests, rivers, and mountains	Krasnoyarsk Krai	2010	1234rev; vii, ix (natural)	Putorana Plateau is the northernmost part of the Central Siberian Plateau. Geologically, it is mainly composed of basalt from the Siberian Traps. This remote and mostly untouched area includes several ecosystems, such as taiga, forest-tundra, tundra, Arctic deserts, lakes, and rivers. The vegetation marks the meeting point between Western and Eastern Siberian floras. The plateau is on a major reindeer migration route.
Lena Pillars Nature Park	Stone pillars overlooking a river	Sakha	2012	1299bis; viii (natural)	Lena Pillars are a natural formation overlooking the Lena River. The pillars, reaching up to 200 metres (660 ft) in height, were formed by harsh continental climate with cold winters, with temperatures far below freezing, and hot summers, resulting in freeze-thaw action widening the intervening joints between the rocks. The pillars consist of Cambrian rocks and contain fossils documenting the early differentiation of species during the Cambrian explosion. A minor boundary modification took place in 2015.
Bolgar Historical and Archaeological Complex	An ensemble of buildings, including a church and a minaret	Tatarstan	2014	981rev; ii, vi (cultural)	Bolghar was the intermittent capital of Volga Bulgaria, a Bulgar state between the 7th and 15th centuries. Following the Mongol invasion in the 13th century, it became an early capital of the Golden Horde and remained an important trade centre during the Khanate of Kazan. The state adopted Islam as official religion in 922 and Bolghar still remains a pilgrimage site of the Volga Tatars.
Landscapes of Dauria*	Rocky desert landscape	Zabaykalsky Krai	2017	1448rev; ix, x (natural)	Dauria, or Transbaikal, is a region east of Lake Baikal. The transnational site comprises areas of Daursky Nature Reserve in Russia and three areas in Mongolia, including the Mongol Daguur Biosphere Reserve. The landscape includes different steppe ecosystems, forests, and grasslands, as well as wetlands and lakes. The area is important as a nesting ground or migration route for several bird species, such as the white-naped crane, and is also a migration area of the Mongolian gazelle.
Assumption Cathedral and Monastery of the town-island of Sviyazhsk	Two white orthodox churches	Tatarstan	2017	1525; ii, iv (cultural)	The town-island, located at the confluence of the Volga, the Sviyaga, and the Shchuka rivers, was founded in 1551 by Ivan the Terrible. Located at a strategic position at a crossroads of Volga route and Silk Road, it was the initial outpost for Ivan's conquest of the Khanate of Kazan. The cathedral and the monastery complex were built in the 16th and renovated in the 18th century. The frescos in the cathedral are among the best examples of Russian Orthodox paintings and are painted in a unique fusion of styles from different regions of Russia.
Churches of the Pskov School of Architecture	An old orthodox church with a white facade and metal-covered domes	Pskov Oblast	2019	1523; ii (cultural)	This site comprises ten churches or monasteries and related buildings in the city of Pskov. They represent the work of the Pskov School that drew from the Byzantine and Novgorod traditions, fused them with the local vernacular tradition, and adjusted the architecture to the use of local resources. The churches date from the 12th to the early 17th century, with the peak of this style in the 15th and 16th centuries. The architects from Pskov worked on monuments in several Russian cities, including Moscow, Kazan, and Sviyazhsk. The Cathedral of St. John from the 12th century is pictured.
Petroglyphs of Lake Onega and the White Sea	A set of petroglyphs found in the Besov Nos cape of the Lake Onega region.	Karelia	2021	1654; iii (cultural)	This site comprises 33 properties with petroglyphs in two clusters. The petroglyphs at Lake Onega depict birds, animals, half human and half animal figures, as well as geometric shapes possibly representing the moon and the sun. The petroglyphs at the White Sea represent hunting and sailing scenes, together with related equipment, as well as animal and human footprints. They were created 6 and 7 thousand years ago and provide an insight into the lives of Neolithic cultures of Fennoscandia.
Astronomical Observatories of Kazan Federal University	An astronomical observatory tower and surrounding buildings	Tatarstan	2023	1678; i, ii, iv, vi (cultural)	This nomination comprises two astronomical observatories. The one at Kazan Federal University was founded in the early 19th century and the one at Engelhardt (pictured) in 1901. They were used to map the positions of stars and objects of the Solar System, as well as to develop astronomical instruments.
Cultural Landscape of Kenozero Lake	A church in an enclosure	Arkhangelsk Oblast	2024	1688; iii (cultural)	The national park encompasses a cultural landscape that was shaped by farmers through centuries between the 12th and 16th centuries. The area is covered by taiga and there are several lakes, the biggest two being Lake Kenozero and Lake Lyokshmozero. There are several wooden churches (St. George's church from the 18th century in Porzhensky Pogost pictured), chapels, holy crosses, and sacred groves.
Rock Paintings of Shulgan-Tash Cave	Cave painting depicting mammoths	Bashkortostan	2025	1743; iii (cultural)	Cave paintings in the Shulgan-Tash, or Kapova Cave, date to the Upper Paleolithic period. They were made in red ochre and depict mammoths, woolly rhinoceroses, bulls, and horses. The cave was occupied for several thousands of years and likely served ritual purposes. It was rediscovered in the mid-20th century.

== Tentative sites ==
In addition to sites inscribed on the World Heritage List, member states can maintain a list of tentative sites that they may consider for nomination. Nominations for the World Heritage List are only accepted if the site was previously listed on the tentative list. As of 2025, Russia recorded 32 sites on its tentative list.

Tentative World Heritage Sites
Site	Image	Location	Year listed	UNESCO criteria	Description
Historical and Cultural Dzheyrakh-Assa Reservation	Stone towers in a mountain landscape	Ingushetia	1996	(cultural)	The museum-reserve comprises 18 settlements in the canyons of the Assa and Armkhi rivers. The settlements are known for their stone towers (towers in Erzi pictured) that had both residential and defensive functions. Most date from the 16th and 17th centuries.
Historic Centre of Irkutsk	A decorated wooden house in red and white	Irkutsk Oblast	1998	(cultural)	The city of Irkutsk, located at the Irkut and Angara rivers 66 kilometres (41 mi) from Lake Baikal, has been shaped by its history spanning over 300 years. Founded in 1661 as a military fort, it received many exiles following the 1825 Decembrist revolt. It saw large-scale urbanization in the 20th century. Several buildings from different time periods have been preserved, including traditional decorated wooden houses (example pictured) and buildings in Siberian Baroque.
Rostov Kremlin	Park, church and walls in the background	Yaroslavl Oblast	1998	ii, iii, iv, vi (cultural)	The Kremlin in the town of Rostov overlooks the Lake Nero. It initially consisted of three parts that were integrated together in the 17th century. The Kremlin contains the Metropolitan residence, several churches, and it is surrounded by high walls. It is one of the best preserved examples of old Russian architecture.
Historic Center of Yeniseysk	An orthodox church	Krasnoyarsk Krai	2000	ii, iii, iv (cultural)	The town of Yeniseysk was founded in 1619 and served as a base for Russian expansion into East Siberia. Located at the bank of the Yenisey River, it was also an important trade centre. The town preserves several buildings from the 18th and 19th centuries. The Monastery of the Transfiguration of the Savior is pictured.
Petroglyphs of Sikachi-Alyan	A rock with a carved face	Khabarovsk Krai	2003	(cultural)	Petroglyphs dating to the prehistoric times are located on cliffs above the Amur River near the village of Sikachi-Alyan. They were noticed by the Russian orientalist Palladius in the late 19th century and were further studied in the 20th century.
The Commander Islands (Comandorsky State Nature Reserve)	Hilly scenery with a river, low vegetation	Kamchatka Krai	2005	vii, viii, ix, x (natural)	The nature reserve comprises two large islands (Bering Island and Medny Island, pictured), a group of smaller islands, and the surrounding waters. The islands are the peaks of a submarine volcanic ridge extending from Alaska to Kamchatka. The islands are an important habitat for birds and sea mammals.
Magadansky State Nature Reserve	Coast and forest, photo from above	Magadan Oblast	2005	vii, viii, ix, x (natural)	The reserve consists of four clusters, three of which are at or near the coast of the Sea of Okhotsk and the fourth is further inland. The climate in the area is subarctic. The forests consist mainly of conifers and there are several endemic plant species. The rivers are important for migrating species of salmons.
Krasnoyarsk Stolby	A large rock formation in a forest	Krasnoyarsk Krai	2007	vii, viii, ix, x (natural)	The stolby (rocks) are rock formations in the Eastern Sayan Mountains. The rocks date to the Paleozoic era, they are of magmatic and sedimentary origin, and contain fossils from the Cambrian period. There are also karst phenomena, such as caves, present. The area is popular with rock climbers, who call the freestyle mountaineering "stolbism".
The Great Vasyugan Mire		Tomsk Oblast	2007	vii, viii, ix, x (natural)	Vasyugan Mire is the largest swamp in the Northern Hemisphere, and is located around the Ob and Irtysh watershed. It developed recently, in the Holocene epoch. The landscape contains peat bogs, fens, and forested mires. The swamp supports large number of insect species, which are in turn food for a large number of migrating and nesting birds. Mammal species present include elk, brown bear, lynx, and sable.
Ensemble of the Astrakhan Kremlin	An orthodox church and a bell tower with green roof	Astrakhan Oblast	2008	ii, iii, iv (cultural)	Following the conquest of the Astrakhan Khanate by Ivan the Terrible, the kremlin of Astrakhan was constructed in 1558, first in wood and then in stone in the following decades. It served as a stronghold in the south-eastern border of Russia and a stop on the Silk Road. The Assumption Cathedral (pictured) is considered as one of the best examples of Russian church architecture of the 18th century.
The Ilmensky mountains	Forest scenery	Chelyabinsk Oblast	2008	vi, vii, viii (natural)	The mountains contain rich deposits of a wide variety of minerals, some of which were first discovered here. They include ilmenite, monazite, cancrinite, and samarskite-(Y). The area is protected as Ilmen Nature Reserve and generally closed to public.
The archeological site of Tanais	Ruins of some buildings	Rostov Oblast	2009	ii, iii, v (cultural)	Tanais was a colony of Bosporan Kingdom, an ancient Greek state. The city was founded in the 3rd century BCE in the Don river delta and quickly became a strong trade centre and a place of interaction between Greeks and nomadic tribes of the steppe, including the Sarmatians. In the 3rd century CE, Tanais was burned down, probably by the Goths. The area remained inhabited but the centre of settlement has moved away from the city ruins in the following centuries.
Bashkir Ural	Cave painting depicting mammoths	Bashkortostan	2012	i, iii, v, vi, viii, x (mixed)	The area in the south part of the Ural Mountains is important both in natural and cultural view. It is rich in biodiversity, being at the meeting point of European and Asian forests and steppes. There are several karst phenomena, including caves. Cave paintings from the Paleolithic have been find in Kapova Cave (pictured). Today, the area is inhabited by the Bashkirs who maintain some ancient traditions, including wild beekeeping.
Virgin Komi Forests (re-nomination)	Forest, river and mountains	Komi Republic	2014	vii, viii, ix, x (natural)	This nomination proposes a boundary modification of the existing World Heritage Site and a further justification of outstanding natural merit as per UNESCO criteria.
Western Caucasus (re-nomination)	Mountain scenery	Krasnodar Krai	2014	ix, x (natural)	This nomination proposes a boundary modification of the existing World Heritage Site.
Mamayev Kurgan Memorial Complex "To the Heroes of the Battle of Stalingrad"	Memorial complex with a large sculpture of a woman holding a sword	Volgograd Oblast	2014	i, iv, vi (cultural)	The complex in Volgograd (formerly Stalingrad) commemorates the fallen during the Battle of Stalingrad of World War II. It was constructed between 1959 and 1967. It consists of several staircases, squares, memorial halls, and is crowned by a huge allegorical statue The Motherland Calls by Yevgeny Vuchetich.
The Oglakhty Range	A funerary mask	Khakassia	2016	i, iii, vi, x (mixed)	The Oglakhty mountain range is located on the bank of the Yenisei river. The area has been inhabited for at least 5000 years and different cultures left several archaeological remains, including petroglyphs and burial sites of the Tashtyk culture from 1st to 7th century CE (funerary mask from this culture pictured). The landscape includes relatively undisturbed forests and steppes with diverse flora and fauna.
Historic Centre of Gorokhovets	Look at a town from above	Vladimir Oblast	2017	ii, iv (cultural)	The town of Gorokhovets was founded in the 12th century on the bank of Klyazma river, to protect the southern border of Vladimir-Suzdal. The town saw its golden age in the 17th and 18th centuries when it was an important trade centre. A number of churches and monasteries were built in that period.
Treasures of the Pazyryk Culture	A weaving depicting two persons and a horse	Altai Republic	2018	i, ii, iii, vi (cultural)	This nomination comprises sites related to the Pazyryk Culture, which was a Scythian nomadic Iron Age archaeological culture from the 6th to 2nd century BCE. Findings include petroglyphs, burial mounds with preserved mummies showing tattoos, as well as remains of textiles (carpet pictured). Some sites are located in the buffer zone of the Golden Mountains of Altai World Heritage Site.
Cathedral of the Transfiguration of the Savior with the Medieval Rampart City Wall of Pereslavl-Zalessky (1152–1157)	A white orthodox church with a green roof	Yaroslavl Oblast	2019	i, ii, iv (cultural)	The Transfiguration Cathedral is the earliest preserved example of Russian white-stone architecture. The design was influenced by the Romanesque style from Western Europe and by Byzantine Empire tradition. The town of Pereslavl-Zalessky was founded by Prince Yuri Dolgorukiy in 1152 and was surrounded by earthen ramparts which are still preserved today.
Heritage of Chukotka Arctic Marine Hunters	Some abandoned houses at the shore, snow around	Chukotka Autonomous Okrug	2019	ii, iii, v, vi (cultural)	This nomination comprises three sites related to the Siberian Yupik (also called Eskimo) people inhabiting the far north of Chukotka. The cemetery complex at Ekven dates from the first millennium AD, the village of Naukan and the complex at Nunak were active from the 15th to the 19th or 20th century. Remains of the Old Bering Sea culture include tools, hunting weapons, household items, and jewellery. Hunters mostly focused on marine mammals and used animal bones to make tools and decorative bone carvings.
Vyatskoe village	A decorated wooden house and a fence in front	Yaroslavl Oblast	2019	ii, v (cultural)	The village of Vyatskoe was first mentioned in 1502 but mostly developed in the 18th century. The architecture has been well preserved, including merchant and peasant houses, churches, and public buildings. There are several thematic museums. The villagers have preserved traditional crafts, including the production of pickled cucumbers.
Divnogorye Historical and Cultural Complex	An orthodox church made out of a rock formation	Voronezh Oblast	2020	ii, iv, v, vi (cultural)	Divnogorye is a chalk and limestone landscape on the bank of the Don river. It has been inhabited since the Upper Paleolithic, when horse hunting took place in the area. In the 9th and 10th centuries, it was a site of a fortified Khazar settlement of Saltovo-Mayaki culture. In the 18th and 19th centuries, the area attracted hermits who carved caves and churches into soft rock (Cave monastery of St. John the Baptist pictured).
National Park Kytalyk	A small plant flowering	Sakha	2021	ix, x (natural)	National park Kytalyk covers parts of the Kolyma Lowland and Yana-Indigirka Lowland and consists of tundra landscape with thermokarst features such as polygonal soils, baydzharakh, and pingos. The area is home to the endangered Siberian crane, as well as several species of ducks and geese.
Valley of the Kings of Tuva	Circular burial mounds from above	Tuva	2021	i, iii, iv (cultural)	The valley of the Uyuk river is the site of thousands of burial mounds (kurgans). They are either stone or earthen and date to the 1st millennium BCE, during the Bronze and Iron Age of the early Scythian cultures. The archaeological studies of the site started in 1915. Some mounds are massive, Arzhaan-1 was originally 120 metres (390 ft) in diameter and 4 metres (13 ft) tall. Thousands of gold objects were discovered in Arzhaan-2 (pictured from above) and are now stored in museums.
Denisova Cave	Entrance to a cave, surrounded by trees	Altai Krai	2022	iii, v (cultural)	Denisova cave is an archaeological site with remains of Pleistocene communities, with deposits spanning 300,000 years. It was at different times inhabited by Neanderthals, modern humans, and Denisovans, a group of archaic humans that were identified in 2010 by genetic analysis of the bone fragments found in the cave. Subsequent analyses also demonstrated that Denisovans occasionally interbred with Neanderthals, and that they contributed to the genetic pool of the Tibetan people and to populations of South, East, and Southeast Asia.
Bashkir Shikhans: Toratau, Yuraktau and Kushtau	A white conical hill in a flat landscape, partially covered by forest	Bashkortostan	2022	viii (natural)	This nomination comprises three shikhans, isolated carbonate hills, that are the remains of an ancient reef that formed during the Permian period. They formed at the junction of two ancient oceans, Tethys and Panthalassa, in the final stages before the formation of the Pangaea. They document all the stages of the reef development, from its formation to extinction. Diverse fossil communities include bryozoa, brachiopods, molluscs, and trilobites. Toratau is pictured.
The Complex of the Voskresensky Copper Smeltery	Remains of an old industrial building in red brick	Bashkortostan	2023	ii, iv, v (cultural)	The copper smelting industrial complex was established in 1740s as the first private enterprise in the region. The complex later expanded to include iron smelters and foundries. The plant was one of the largest in the Ural Mountains and stimulated development of mining plants in Orenburg Oblast. It ceased operating in 1902. Today, the complex is the best preserved example of a copper smelting plant, with 12 remaining objects, including industrial buildings, a church, a hospital, and warehouses.
Historic Town Centre of Torzhok and Country Estate Properties Designed by Nikolay Lvov	A Neoclassical Orthodox monastery	Tver Oblast	2023	i, iv, vi (cultural)	Torzhok is one of the oldest Russian towns and it is located on the route from Moscow to Saint Petersburg. After a 1766 fire that destroyed the centre, the town was rebuilt in Neoclassical style. The reconstruction was headed by the architect Nikolay Lvov, who drew from the ideas of the Italian Renaissance architect Andrea Palladio. One of his works is the Borisoglebskiy Cathedral (pictured). Lvov's work was continued by other architects, including Carlo Rossi.
Memorials to the Heroes of the Great Patriotic War: Brest Fortress and Mamayev Kurgan*	Monument depicting a woman with a sword in the background, a pond with a Cyrillic inscription at the side in front	Volgograd Oblast	2024	ii, iv, vi (cultural)	This nomination comprises two memorial sites to the Great Patriotic War, or the Eastern Front of World War II - Brest Fortress in Belarus and Mamayev Kurgan in Russia. The latter commemorates the Battle of Stalingrad which turned the tides of the war in favour of the Allies. It was constructed between 1959 and 1967 and features the monumental sculpture The Motherland Calls (pictured in the background). Both memorial complexes contributed to the development of the heroic Soviet art style which became prominent in socialist countries.
Complex of Structures of the Tsoi-Pede Necropolis		Chechnya	2024	ii (cultural)	A medieval necropolis on a remote rocky promontory at the confluence of the Chanty-Argun and Meshi-khi rivers, featuring stone crypts, sanctuaries with solar symbols, defensive walls and towers, reflecting medieval Chechen funerary and architectural traditions.
Exhibition of Achievements of National Economy (VDNKh), Moscow		Moscow	2025	ii, iv (cultural)	A vast permanent exhibition, museum and recreational complex in Moscow illustrating the technological, industrial and agricultural achievements of the Soviet Union and modern Russia, comprising hundreds of themed pavilions, monumental architecture and public spaces that reflect the evolution of Soviet and Russian exhibition practice and socialist aesthetic ideals.

== See also ==
- List of World Heritage Sites in the Soviet Union
- Tourism in Russia
