= Denis Manturov =

Russian politician (born 1969)

- Денис Мантуров
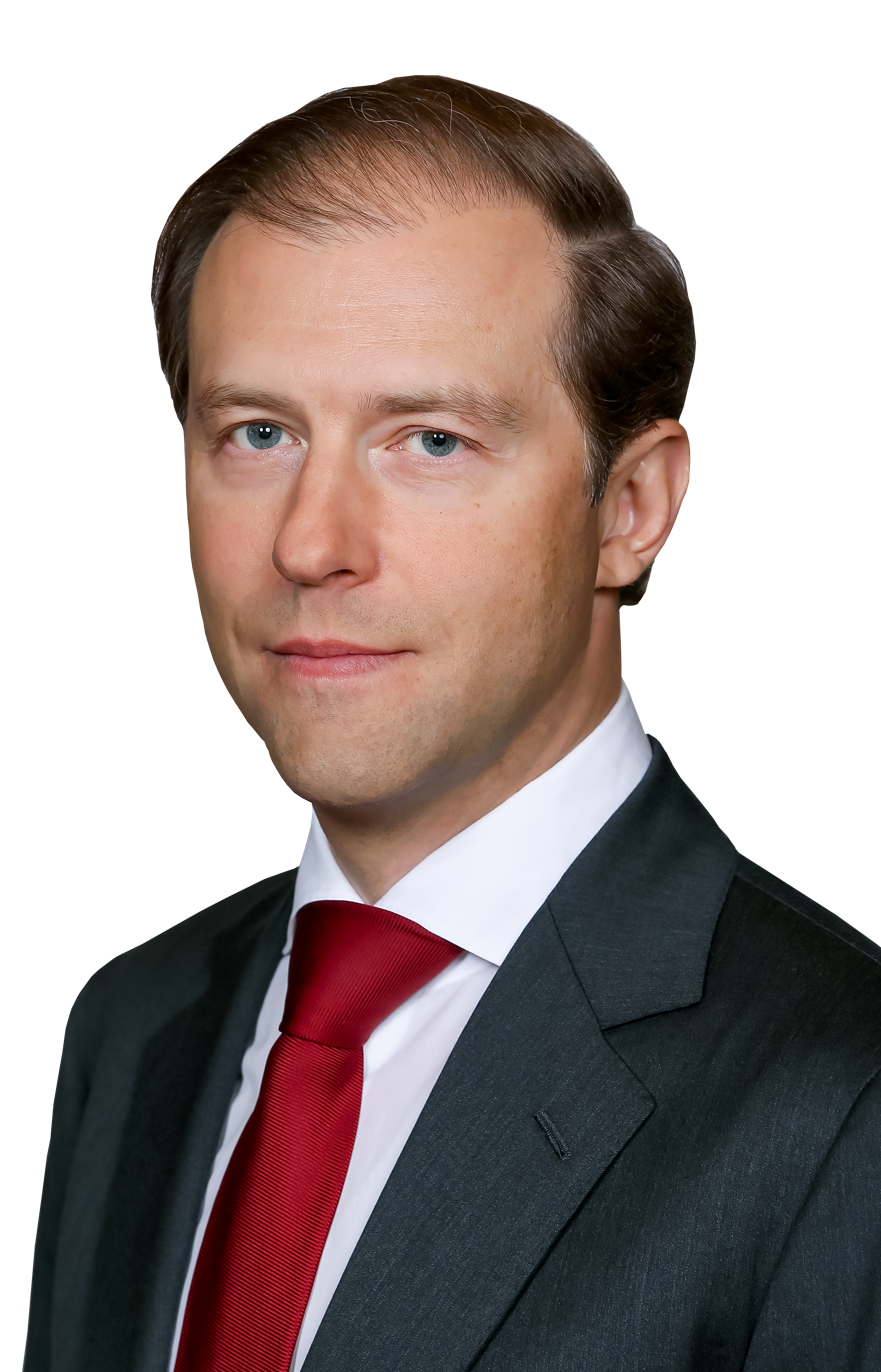
- Official portrait, 2018

First Deputy Prime Minister of Russia
- Incumbent
- Assumed office 14 May 2024
- Prime Minister: Mikhail Mishustin
- Preceded by: Andrey Belousov

Deputy Prime Minister of Russia for Defence and Space Industry
- In office 15 July 2022 – 7 May 2024; Acting: 7–14 May 2024
- Prime Minister: Mikhail Mishustin
- Preceded by: Yury Borisov

Minister of Industry and Trade
- In office 21 May 2012 – 7 May 2024; Acting: 2 February – 21 May 2012; Acting: 7–14 May 2024
- Prime Minister: Vladimir Putin; Dmitry Medvedev; Mikhail Mishustin
- Preceded by: Viktor Khristenko
- Succeeded by: Anton Alikhanov

Personal details
- Born: Denis Valentinovich Manturov; 23 February 1969 (age 57) Murmansk, Russian SFSR, Soviet Union
- Party: Independent
- Education: Moscow State University; Moscow Aviation Institute; Russian Presidential Academy of National Economy and Public Administration

Denis Valentinovich Manturov (Russian: Дени́с Валенти́нович Ма́нтуров; born 23 February 1969) is a Russian politician who has served as First Deputy Prime Minister of Russia since May 2024. He previously served as Deputy Prime Minister from July 2022 until May 2024 and Minister of Trade and Industry of the Russian Federation from 2012 to May 2024. He was appointed First Deputy Prime Minister after Andrey Belousov was appointed Minister of Defense.

He has the federal state civilian service rank of 1st class Active State Councillor of the Russian Federation.

== Early life and education ==
- 1994 – Graduated from State Moscow University in Sociology
- 2006 – Graduated from Russian State Academy for State Service under the president of Russia
- Since 2011 – Professor for Management Systems of Economic Objects at the Moscow Aviation Institute

In 1997, he completed postgraduate studies at the Moscow State University. In the same year he defended his dissertation for the degree of Candidate of Economic Sciences. The dissertation topic was "Socio-economic analysis of investment activity in the regions of Russia".

In 2022, he completed his doctoral studies at the Moscow Aviation Institute. On May 27, 2022, he defended his dissertation for the degree of Doctor of Economics at the Russian Presidential Academy of National Economy and Public Administration. The thesis topic was "Theory and practice of the development and implementation of a new model of industrial policy".

== Career ==
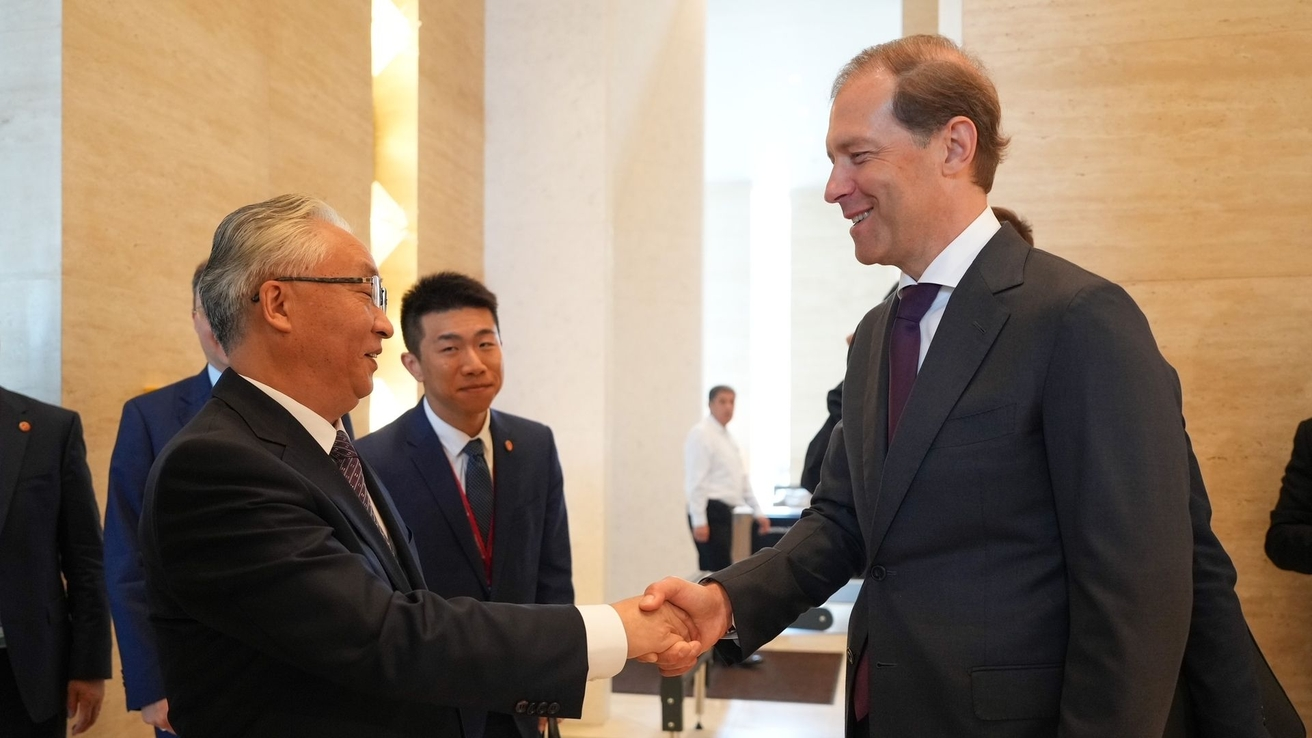
Manturov with Chinese Vice Premier Zhang Guoqing in Vladivostok, Russia, 11 September 2023

- 1998–2000 – Deputy Director General of Ulan-Ude Aviation Plant
- 2000–2001 – Commercial Director of Mil Moscow Helicopters Plant
- 2001–2003 – Deputy Chairman of Federal State Investments Corporation
- 2003–2007 – Director General of United Industry Corporation, Oboronprom
- 2007–2008 – Deputy Minister of Industry and Energy of the Russian Federation
- 2008 – Deputy Minister of Industry and Trade of Russia
- 2012–2024 – Manturov was appointed acting Minister of Industry and Trade, his appointment was re-approved on 21 May 2012, in ministerial office as Minister of Industry and Trade in Dmitry Medvedev's Cabinet
- 2015–present – named to the board of director of United Aircraft Corporation

=== Deputy Prime Minister of Russia for Defence and Space Industry (July 2022 – May 2024) ===
On 15 July 2022, Manturov became Deputy Prime Minister of Russia for Defence and Space Industry. He was responsible in this position for "state policy in the areas of industry, national defense, defense procurement, law enforcement, military-technical cooperation with foreign countries, mobilization preparations and management of the state material reserve."

In January 2023, Manturov received a dressing down from Russian president Vladimir Putin for not expediting the contracting of new aircraft, during a televised meeting with members of the Russian Cabinet. Manturov said he would try to make sure it’s done during the first quarter; Putin, visibly angry, said, "You don’t try to do all you can, you do it within a month, no later than that."

=== First Deputy Prime Minister of Russia (May 2024 – present) ===
Shortly after the Fifth inauguration of Vladimir Putin in May 2024, Manturov became First Deputy Prime Minister of Russia. He oversees both the Defense and Civilian Industries in Russia.

On 8 July 2024, Manturov received the prime minister of India, Narendra Modi, in Moscow.

On 7 August 2024, Manturov was designated as Kursk Oblast crisis manager as Putin tried to cope with the August 2024 Kursk Oblast incursion. On 30 September 2024, Manturov was appointed to the Security Council of Russia by decree.

== Family ==
He is currently married to his wife Natalia, with whom he has two children (the oldest being Leonela and the youngest being Yevgeny). Leonela is currently a member of the Faculty of Sociology at Moscow State University. According to SPARK-Interfax, Manturov's father, Valentin, owned 50% of a financial company along with son of Rostec head Sergey Chemezov from November 2017 until his death in 2019. Following his father's death, the stake in Financial Systems was transferred to Manturov's mother, Tamara. His parents are also reported to own the five-star hotel Chekhoff Moscow Curio Collection by Hilton in Moscow along with a number of other hotels, resorts, and a winery. In July 2024 Manturov's father was honored with a fishing trawler in his name by the Murmansk based shipping company Norebo.

== Lobbying interests ==
Manturov called for the transfer of natural monuments Yuraktau, Kushtau and Toratau to the Bashkir soda company.

== Awards ==
- Order "For Merit to the Fatherland" II Degree (2007)
- Order of Friendship (2008)
- Order of Honour (2009)
- Russian Federation Presidential Certificate of Honour (2010)
- Order "For Merit to the Fatherland" (2013)
- Order "For Merit to the Fatherland" III Degree (2016)
- Order of Alexander Nevsky (2018)
- Medal of Stolypin P.A. I Degree (2018)
- Title of Honored Economist of the Russian Federation (2019)
- Order of the Star of Italy (2020; revoked)
- Order "For Merit to the Fatherland" II Degree (2022)

Political offices
Preceded by Viktor Khristenko	Minister of Trade and Industry; 2012–2024	Succeeded by Anton Alikhanov
Preceded by Andrey Belousov	First Deputy Prime Minister of Russia; 2024–present	Incumbent
