= Shakhtau =

Mountain in Russia

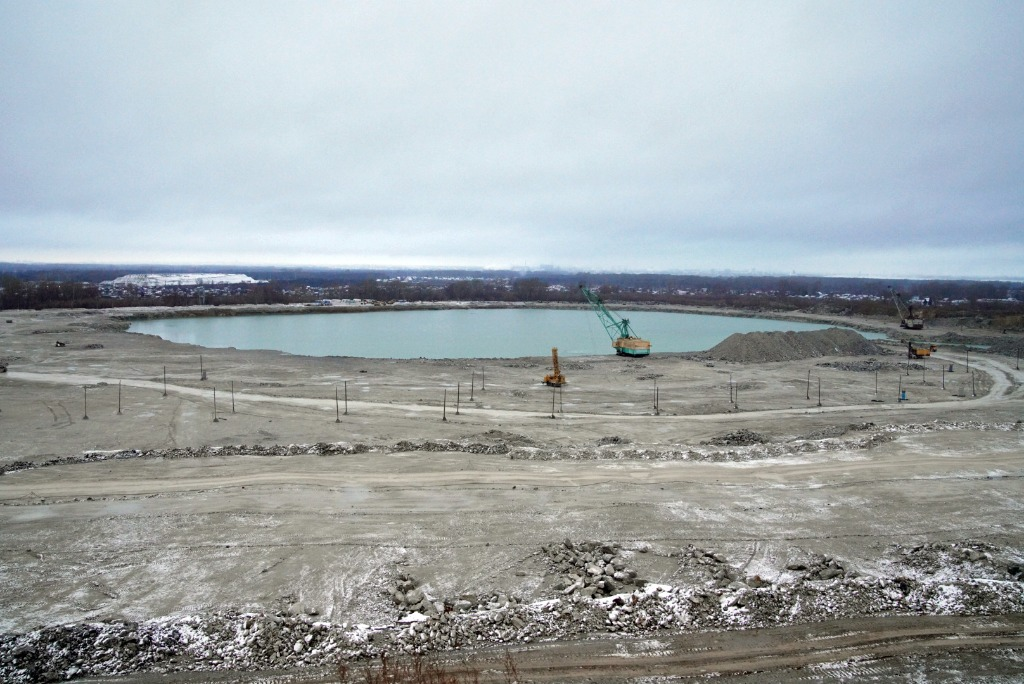

Highest point
- Coordinates: 53°38′59″N 56°05′57″E

Geography
- Location: Ishimbaysky District, Bashkortostan, Russia
- Parent range: Southern Ural

External images
- The former place of Shakhtau
- The Shakhtau destruction
- Shakhtau in 1950 years

Shakhtau (Bashkir: Шаһтау — «king-mountain») - one of the four shihans, located in Ishimbaysky District, on the border with the Shakhtau microdistrict of the city Sterlitamak. The name of the mountain has several variations: Shachtau, Shaketau, Ashak-tau, Tsar-Gora.

One of the chain of four shihans in the vicinity of the Ishimbay and Sterlitamak cities. Along with Toratau, Yuraktau and Kushtau, which are selected in the short list of the project "Seven Wonders of Russia" (as well Shihany).

The name "Shakhtau" is known to the Balkarians and Karachais, so they call Elbrus.

Like the other shihans, the remainder of the Permian period (late Paleozoic) reef massif formed over 230 million years ago in the tropical sea.

Now the mountain is completely destroyed as a result of geological work to obtain raw materials for Bashkir soda company; in place of the shihan is a quarry. The fate of Shakhtau can comprehend several similar shihans. In Bashkortostan there is a campaign for the conservation of natural monuments. Activists consider the act of destroying Shakhtau as an example of a barbaric attitude toward nature, and a quarry formed in its place is called a scar on the face of Bashkortostan.

== Physiographic characteristic ==
Shakhtau - a short ridge with a length of 1.3 kilometres (0.81 mi), a width of 980 m (3,220 ft), stretched in the north-west direction. Rises above the level of the river. White (before the development) at 210 m (336 m or 1,102 ft above sea level). Located on the right bank of the river Seleuk.

The Shakhtau massif consists of limestones crumpled into a fold of a submeridional strike, the axis of which rises in a southerly direction; the eastern slope of the massif is vigorously blurred in pre-Darth times and accordingly on the eastern wing there is a sharp inconsistent overlap of the Upper-Atian sediments to the Asselian and Sakmarian. The formation of the tectono-sedimentation structure of the reef deposits of the Shakhtau massif was also influenced by the regional dislocations of the Southern Ural and, in particular, the formation of the Shikhan upraised horst, which has punctured and elevated single mountains by 1,000 m (3,281 ft), in comparison with the same-aged massifs of the western side of the marginal trough. The combination of the primary capricious accumulation of precipitation of reef facies and superposed tectonic processes led to the formation of a body that is very complex in its internal structure.

The limestones of Shakhtau are characterized by the usual qualities of limestones of organogenic structures: chemical purity, light coloration, massiveness, lack of stratification, textural heterogeneity of various scales (spotting), a wide variety of rock types, and their frequent change. In addition to pure limestones, dolomitic limestones of clearly secondary origin are found in the massif. The limestones of Shakhtau are extremely rich in the remains of various organisms of excellent preservation.

Shakhtau is now a limestone quarry, officially a "limestone deposit", for the Sterlitamak soda-cement plant (OJSC Soda). The development of limestone began in 1950. By 1975, the top part of Tsar-Gory was reduced by more than 35 meters (115 ft). By now, there is almost nothing left of the mountain.

== History ==
A detailed study of the mountain began in the 19th century. Vannheim von Kvalan in 1842 published the first information about the Shihan. Earlier (1841), Schachtau was visited by Roderick Murchison and Edmund Verney, who compiled a profile through Shakhtau in the form of a brachyanticlinal fold, complicated by a fault. Subsequently, paleontological materials on shihan were processed by S. Kutorga, V. Miller, H. G. Pander, and others; F. Chernyshev and N. Gerasimov gave the most complete description of the brachiopods of Shakhtau.

By the beginning of the 1930s, three points of view on the genesis of the Shihans were emerging: a) brachyanticlinal folds, b) erosional remains, and c) reef massifs. The work of a number of geologists, conducted in 1936-1939, made it possible to firmly establish the reef nature of shihans.

The second stage of the study of massifs began after the discovery of oil in the Southern Ural. The similarity of Shakhtau and the buried oil and gas bearing arrays made him turn to many stratigraphs. During the war years, geologists from the Bashkir oil expedition of the USSR Academy of Sciences repeatedly turned to shihan to find out the features of the facies and the history of the formation of oil and gas bearing burials of massifs Ishimbayskoye Priuralie.

Detailed exploration of Shakhtau with mass drilling was started in 1950s to determine its suitability for soda-cement plant in the city of Sterlitamak. A large number of wells was drilled, which made it possible to compile a geological map of the array and a series of profiles through it. This revealed the complex structure of the array - its dislocation, the presence of intraformational erosion, in some areas - a cloak-like occurrence. It was found out that the array is reefogenic, but crumpled into a crease and was significantly eroded, that is, as if excluding each other's assumptions about the genesis of the massif were all partially justified.

In 1959, on the eastern slope, a cemetery dating from the 13th and 14th centuries was discovered.

In the 1960s and 1970s, many geologists visited the mine of Shakhtau, mostly paleontologists to collect comparative material.

Data on Shakhtau were also used to understand the reservoir properties of reef-based limestones. VK Gromov and RK Petrova identified two types of cracks, differing in extent and degree of openness, forming in aggregate four intersecting systems of cracks.

Microfracturing of the rocks was studied by AM Tyurikhin, who traced three times the time boundaries of microcracks - the oldest resemble styloliths, the middle age ones have bituminous or mineral fill, and the youngest ones are open.

Mt. Shahtau was the object of an excursion to the VIII International Congress on Stratigraphy and Geology of the Carboniferous in 1975.

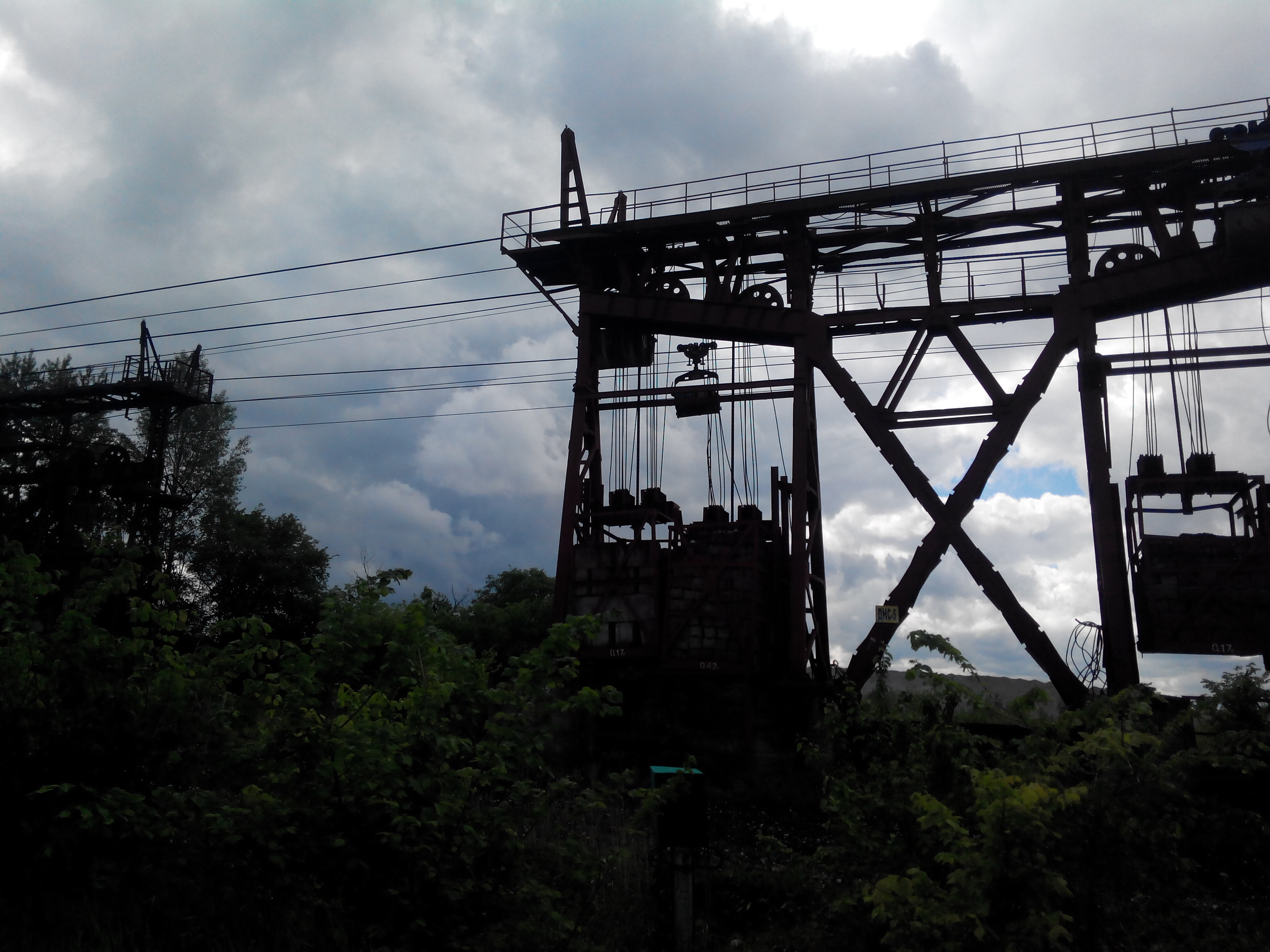
Hinged conveyor transports rock from Shakhtau to a soda plant Sterlitamak

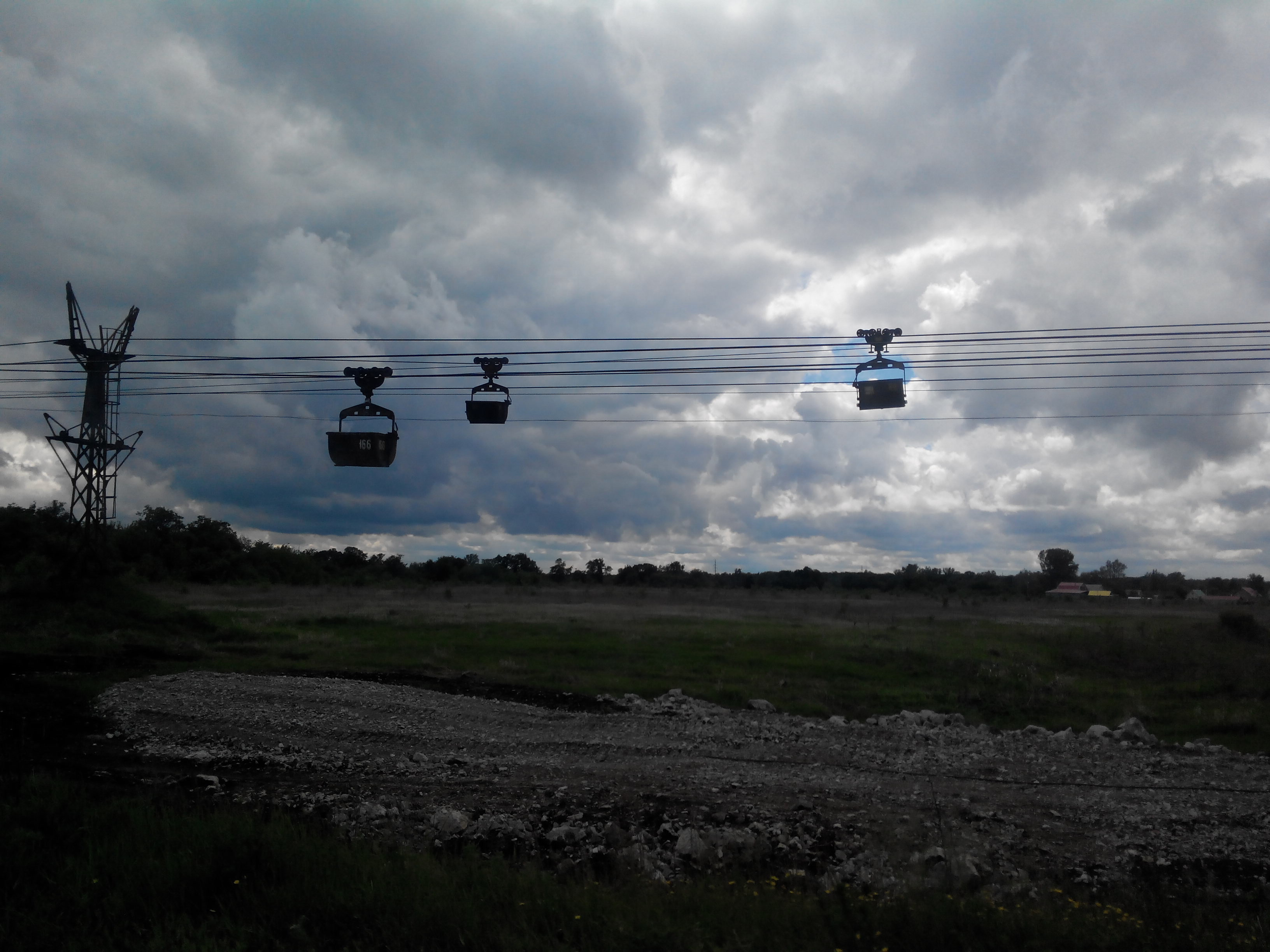

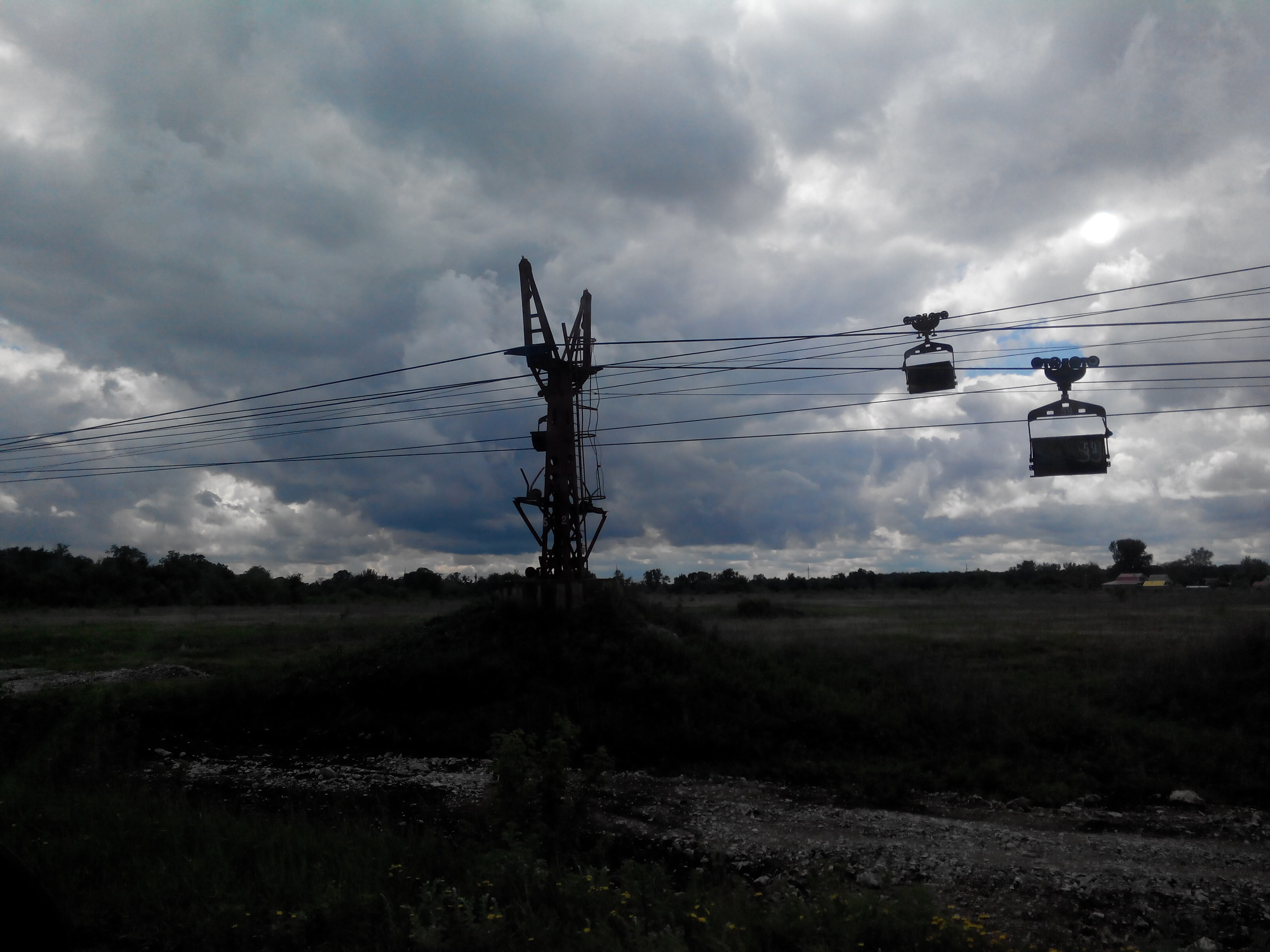
