= Sviyazhsk (disambiguation) =

Sviyazhsk — rural locality in Russia. Other uses include:

- Sviyazhsk Assumption Monastery
- Sviyazhsk railway station
- Sviyazhsky Kanton
- Sviyazhsky Uyezd
- Russian corvette Grad Sviyazhsk
