= Battle of Yuraktau (1707) =

- Part of Bashkir rebellion of 1704–1711
Date	1707
Location	Yuraktau
Result	Bashkir-Kazakh victory

Belligerents
Bashkir rebels Kazakh Khanate	Tsardom of Russia

Commanders and leaders
Aldar Batyr; Kusyum Batyr (WIA); Iman Batyr †; Abulkhair Sultan (WIA)	Peter Khokhlov (WIA); Peter Shaposhnikov (surrendered)

Strength
8,000	1,300

Casualties and losses
	from 970 to 1,200 killed

The Battle of Yuraktau is a ten-day battle between Bashkir rebels under the command of Aldar Isekeyev and Kusyum Tyulekeev and the government troops of the Tsardom of Russia under the command of Peter Khokhlov.

== Background ==
A regiment of 1,300 soldiers under the command of Khokhlov was sent against the rebels, who retreated.

== Course of hostilities ==
Aldar attacked the royal army at Mount Yuraktau. The troops of the rebels engaged in battle with the tsarist troops, the government forces were completely defeated.

== See also ==
- Battle of Kazan (1708)
