= Battle of Kazan =

The Battle of Kazan may refer to the following:

- Various battles during Mongol invasion of Volga Bulgaria
- Siege of Kazan (1469), in the Russo-Kazan Wars
- Siege of Kazan (1487), in the Russo-Kazan Wars
- Siege of Kazan (1524), in the Russo-Kazan Wars
- Siege of Kazan (1552), the final battle of the Russo-Kazan Wars
- Battle of Kazan (1708), the battle of Bashkir rebellion of 1704–1711.
- Battle of Kazan (1774) as a part of the Pugachev's Rebellion
- Battle of Kazan (1918) part of Kazan Operation during the Russian Civil War.
- Capture of Kazan by the White Army as a part of Russian Civil war
