= List of World Heritage Sites in the Soviet Union =

Location of UNESCO World Heritage Sites in the USSR

The United Nations Educational, Scientific and Cultural Organization (UNESCO) World Heritage Sites are places of importance to cultural or natural heritage as described in the UNESCO World Heritage Convention, established in 1972. Cultural heritage consists of monuments (such as architectural works, monumental sculptures, or inscriptions), groups of buildings, and sites (including archaeological sites). Natural heritage consists of natural features (physical and biological formations), geological and physiographical formations (including habitats of threatened species of animals and plants), and natural sites which are important from the point of view of science, conservation, or natural beauty. The Soviet Union, officially the Union of Soviet Socialist Republics (USSR), ratified the convention on 12 October 1988. Five sites, all cultural, were inscribed at the 14th session of the UNESCO World Heritage Committee, held in Banff, Alberta, Canada, in 1990. The Soviet Union collapsed a year later and management of all the sites are continued by the successor states: three in Russia, and one each in Ukraine and Uzbekistan.

== World Heritage Sites ==
UNESCO lists sites under ten criteria; each entry must meet at least one of the criteria. Criteria i through vi are cultural, and vii through x are natural. "SSR" stands for Soviet Socialist Republic, whereas "SFSR" stands for Soviet Federative Socialist Republic.

World Heritage Sites
| Site | Image | Location | Year listed | UNESCO data | Description |
|---|---|---|---|---|---|
| Kiev: Saint-Sophia Cathedral and Related Monastic Buildings, Kiev-Pechersk Lavra | Church with green and golden domes | Kiev, Ukrainian SSR | 1990 | 527; i, ii, iii, iv (cultural) | The Saint-Sophia Cathedral was constructed in the 11th century, soon after the Christianization of Kievan Rus'. Mosaics and frescos from that period have been preserved in the interior. Monastic buildings around the cathedral were constructed in the 17th and 18th centuries in Ukrainian Baroque style. The Kiev-Pechersk Lavra is a monastic ensemble which was developing from the 11th to the 19th centuries. It comprises churches, monasteries, and caves where saints were buried. It was an important centre of the Eastern Orthodox Church. |
| Historic Centre of Leningrad and Related Groups of Monuments | Baroque palace with green and gold facade and a Russian flag on the top | Leningrad, Russian SFSR | 1990 | 540; i, ii, iv, vi (cultural) | Leningrad was conceived by Tsar Peter the Great as a new capital and port city at the banks of the Neva River, at the Gulf of Finland. It was constructed in the early 18th century on a difficult terrain of marshes, peatlands, and rocks. This site comprises its historic centre with Baroque and Neoclassical architecture, as well as surrounding monuments and palaces, such as those in Pushkin and Petergof. Notable buildings include the Winter Palace (pictured, home of the Hermitage Museum), the Admiralty, and the Marble Palace. In the 20th century, Leningrad was the site of the October Revolution and a siege during World War II. |
| Itchan Kala | Look at a city from above, buildings in brick and a tower with ceramic tiles | Khiva, Uzbek SSR | 1990 | 543; iii, iv, vi (cultural) | Itchan Kala is the fortress of the Khiva oasis, an common stop for caravans before crossing the desert to Persia. It is surrounded by walls up to 10 metres (33 ft) high. Over 2,000 years old, it has several monuments built between the 14th and 19th century, including the Djuma Mosque, as well as various mausoleums, madrasas, and two palaces. |
| Kizhi Pogost | Two old wooden churches and a clock tower | Karelia, Russian SFSR | 1990 | 544; i, iv, v (cultural) | The architectural ensemble of the Kizhi Pogost (enclosure) on the Kizhi Island in the Lake Onega comprises two wooden churches from the 18th century (the Church of the Transfiguration and the Church of the Intercession) and a clock tower from 1862. They were built in a unique artistic style and represent a culmination of Russian carpentry techniques. Even if the buildings have seen periodic repairs, they have not been significantly reconstructed. |
| Kremlin and Red Square, Moscow | Saint Basil's Cathedral and people in front | Moscow, Russian SFSR | 1990 | 545; i, ii, iv, vi (cultural) | The Moscow Kremlin is the oldest part of Moscow, first mentioned in 1147. In the 13th century, it served as the seat of the Grand Duchy of Moscow and a religious centre. The walls and towers were built in the late 15th and early 16th century, as well as the churches that were designed by invited Italian architects with Italian Renaissance influences. The Assumption Cathedral was the site of coronations and the Cathedral of the Archangel served as the burial site of Russian princes and tsars. Civic buildings were constructed in the 18th and 19th centuries. Red Square is located outside the Kremlin walls. Saint Basil's Cathedral, located at the end of Red Square, is pictured. |

== See also ==
- Soviet Union and the United Nations
- List of World Heritage Sites in Russia
- List of World Heritage Sites in Ukraine
- List of World Heritage Sites in Uzbekistan
