= Sviyazhsk railway station =

Railway station in Yäşel Üzän District, Tatarstan

Coordinates: 55°48′02″N 48°31′38″E

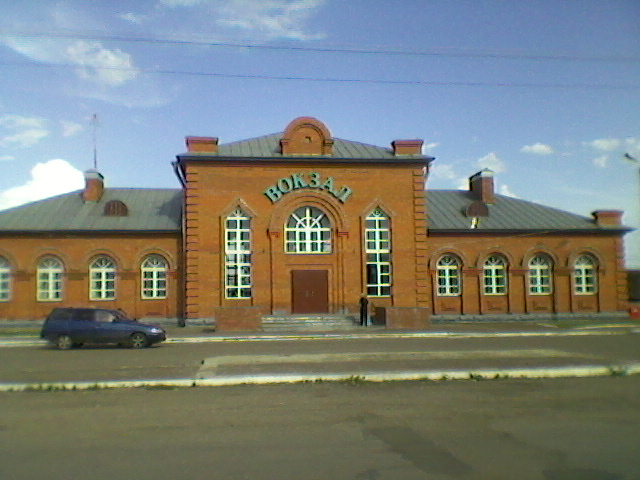
Station building in 2013.

Station Sviyazhsk - Gorky Railway Station in Sviyazhsk, at Nizhnie Vyazovye. Enters into the Department of Railway Stations, a subsidiary of Joint Stock Company "Russian Railways".

The station is located on the Moscow - Kazan - Yekaterinburg at a distance of 752 kilometres (467 mi) from Moscow. From the station to the south line goes in Buinsk and going to the Kuibyshev Railway - in Ulyanovsk.

The station is located on the right bank of the Volga River at the intersection with the highway M7 (in this case prior to 1998). Until the mid-1990s lower Volga, there was no road bridge, so between the station and the station Sviyazhsk Zeleonyj Dol, located on the left bank, went to the so-called "Rainbow" - the train from the platform, carrying a car from one coast to another.
