= Shihan (single hill) =

Coordinates: 53.689781°N 56.077161°E

Shihan or Shikhan (Bashkir: Шихан) is a hill or ridge of isolated chalk hills that are stretched out along with the Belaya River, next to the Sterlitamak city in Bashkortostan Republic, Russia. Prominently standing out of the landscape (akin to buttes) they are notable local landmarks.

In the Western Urals, the shihans geologically are reef residues left by ancient seas and are composed of sedimentary limestone. In the Urals, shihans are rocky peaks of the mountains.

In the Volga region shihans often can be met on the slopes of river valleys.

== Shihans in Bashkortostan ==
The ridge in Bashkortostan consist of four isolated mountains: Toratau, Shakhtau, Yuraktau and Kushtau, forming a narrow chain stretching along the Belaya River (Russian: Белая река) for 20 km.

The mountains are located nearby Sterlitamak, Ishimbay and Salavat cities and are remnants of Fringing reef that formed in warm seas of early Permian period. The sediments have fossils that mostly consist of remains of ancient invertebrates.

Shihans are characterized by mildly angled slopes of about 30° degrees and by having scree towards the bottom.

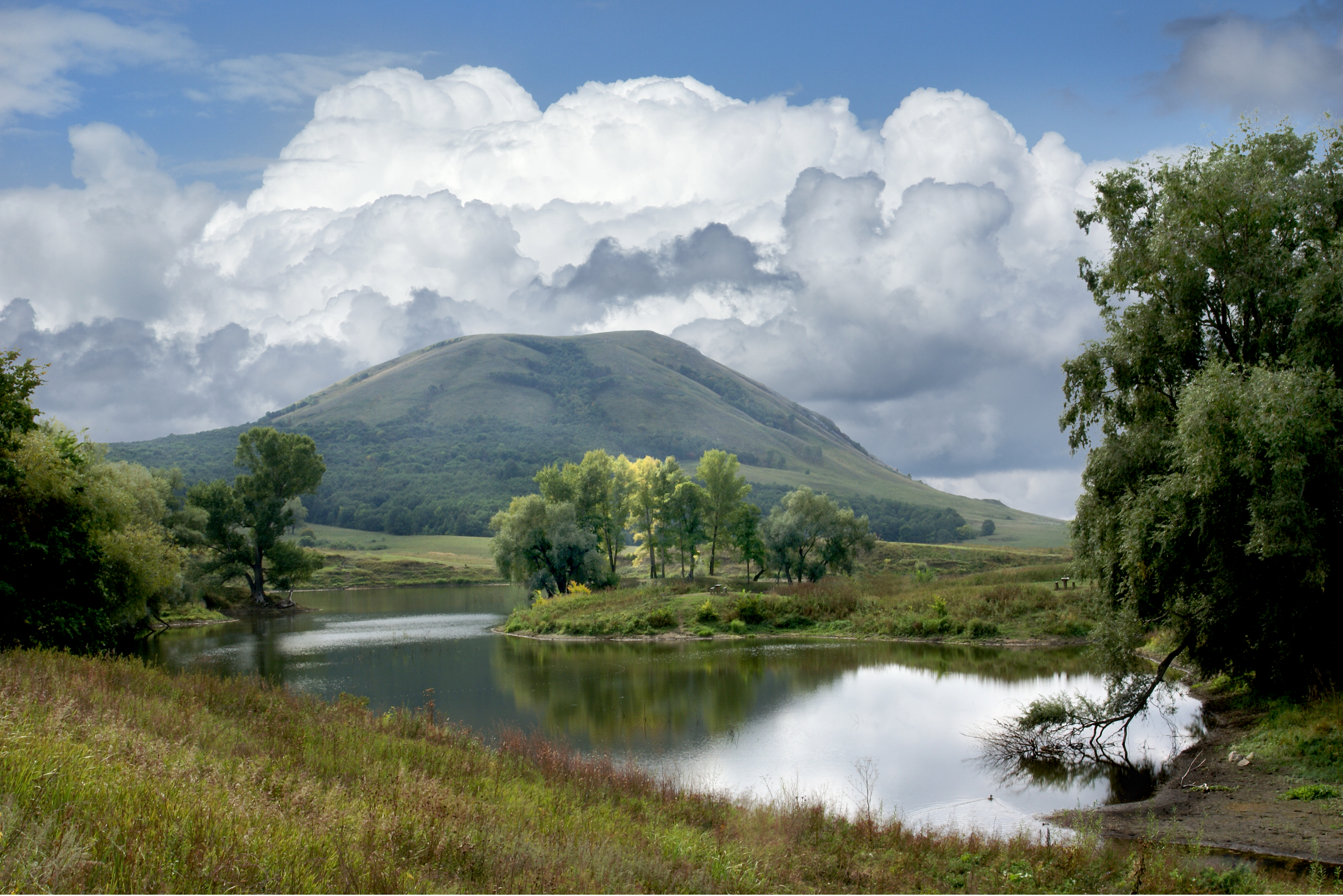
Toratau

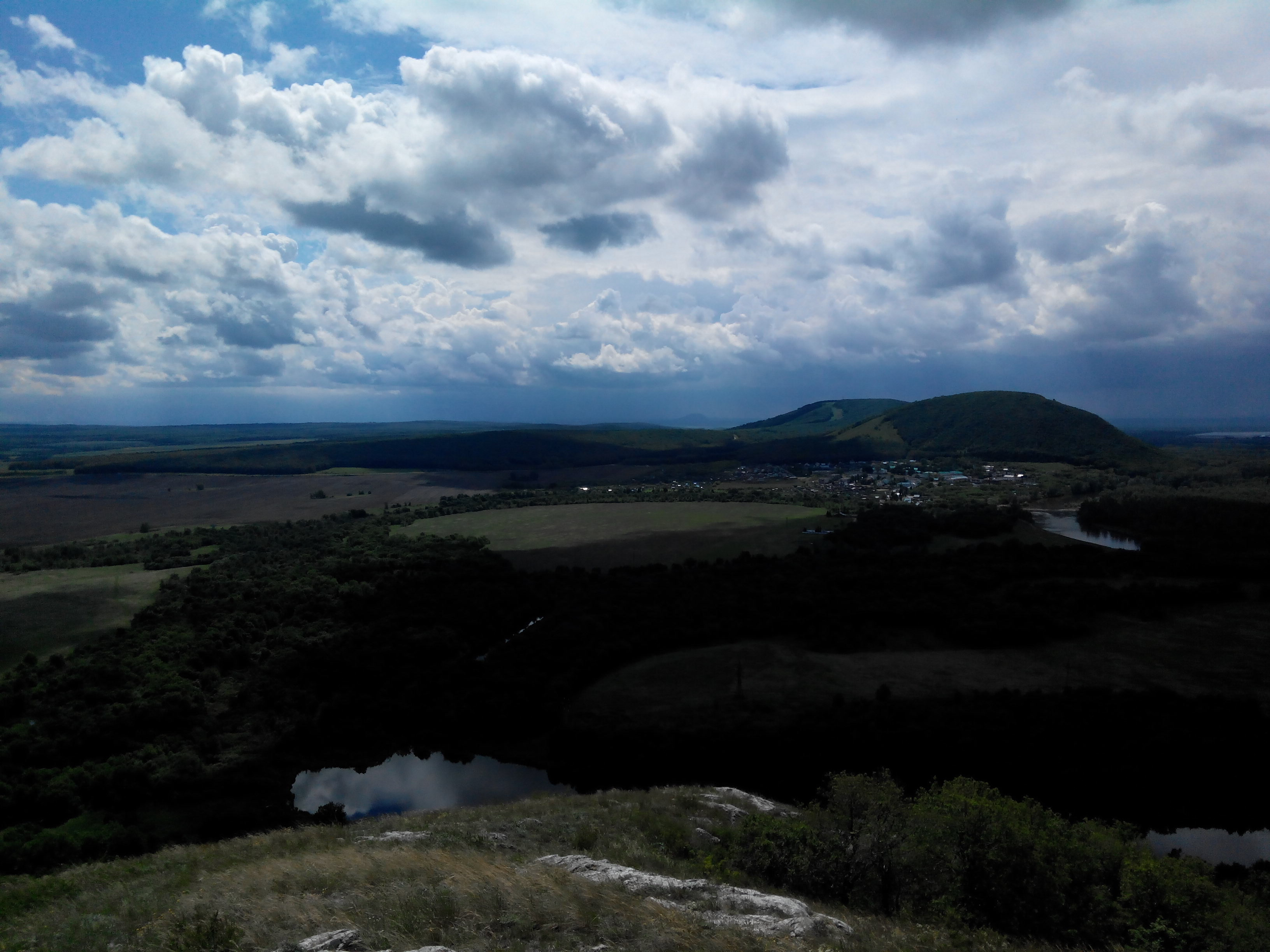
Kushtau Shihan (single hill)

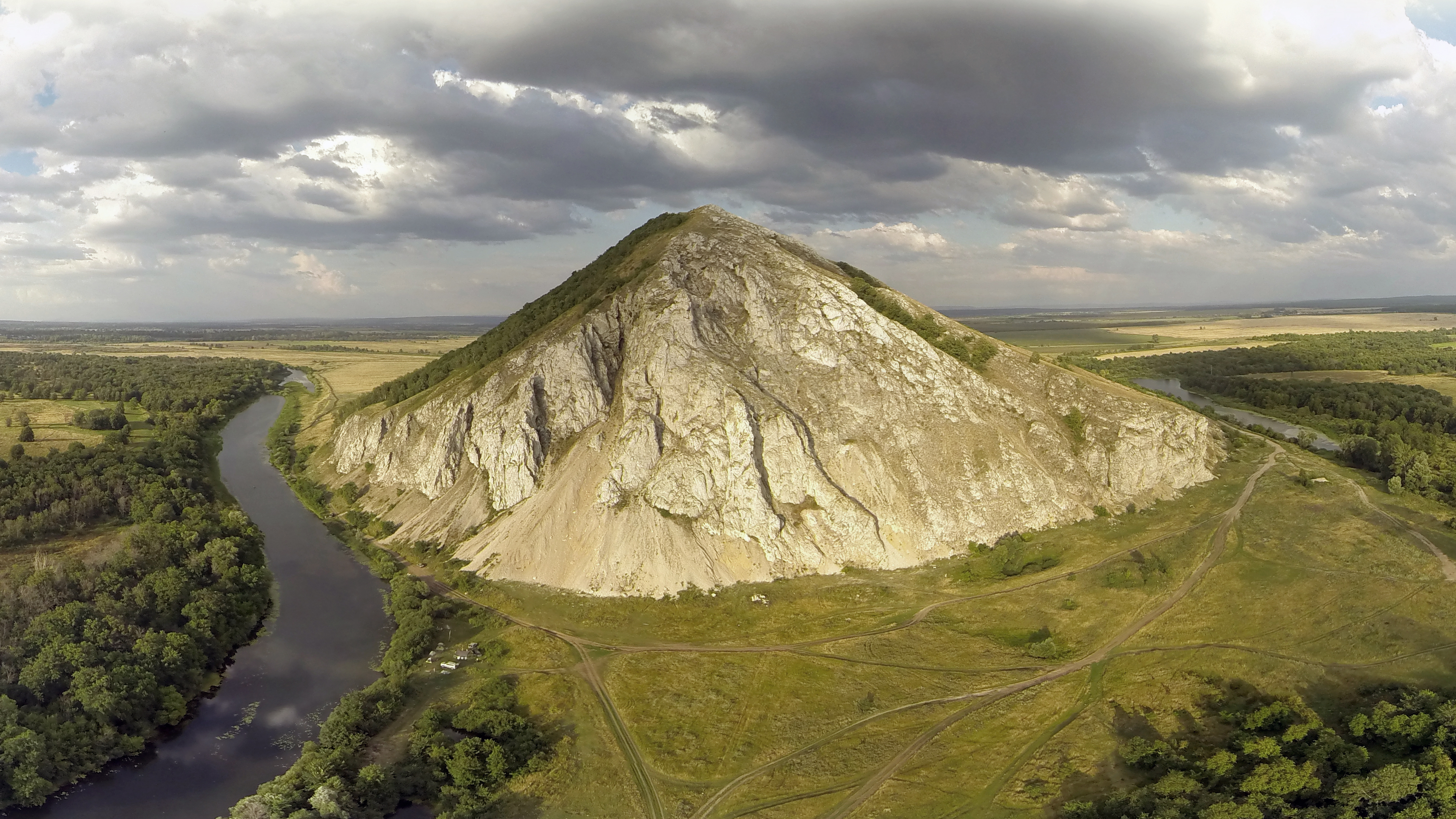
Yuraktau

== See also ==
- North Downs
- Shikhany — A closed town locate nearby, which is suspected to harbor chemical facility which in the past was used to produce deadly poisons, such as Novichok
