= Battle of Kazan (1708) =

Major battle of Bashkir rebellion of 1704–1711

- Part of Bashkir rebellion of 1704–1711
Date	22 February 1708
Location	Kazan, Tsardom of Russia
Result	Russian victory

Belligerents
Bashkirs; Tatars; Chuvashs; Mari; Udmurts	Tsardom of Russia

Commanders and leaders
Aldar Isekeyev; Kusyum Tyulekeev	(Tsardom of Russia) Peter Khovansky

Strength
40,000 rebels	10,000

The Battle of Kazan was a battle between rebel troops consisting of Mari, Udmurts, Bashkirs, Tatars and Chuvashs against government troops of the Tsardom of Russia. It was part of the Bashkir rebellion of 1704–1711 against Russia's newly levied taxes to pay for its Great Northern War in Europe.

== Background ==
The governor of the city of Vyatka, Colonel Grigorov, estimated the number of Bashkir rebels at 40,000 people. Perhaps these figures are not complete. When the Bashkir detachments arrived on the territory of the Kazan district, local Tatars, Mari, Chuvash and Udmurts joined them.

An impressive threat loomed near Kazan. A fierce struggle unfolded on the territory of the county. The oppressed masses, suffering double oppression, social and national, hurried to take advantage of the moment to deal with the nobles, ministers of churches and monasteries, officials of the tsarist administration, with all those who took away their land, cattle, converted to Christians, mocked customs and culture. Landowner villages, monasteries, and churches were ablaze.

In an environment when the tsarist government did not know how to cope with the rebellious peoples of the Ural-Volga region, a new hotbed of resistance arose in the Caucasus – the Muslim nations of the Caucasus rose up to fight.

== Course of hostilities ==
At the end of January 1708, Khovansky arrived in Kazan, but could not immediately launch an offensive against the rebels, because the allocated regiments were gathering slowly. The chief commander started negotiations with the Bashkir rebels, although the latter hardly agreed to it.

By 20 February 1708, the concentration of military forces in Kazan was completed. Annenkov's infantry regiments consisting of 711 men and Norov — 675 men from Moscow, Meshcherinov — 816 men and Titov - 1045 men from Lomov arrived there. In addition, in Kazan, P. Boltin's dragoon regiment, consisting of 1,169 people, fell into Khovansky's location., infantry regiments of Urn — 1029 people and Yankovsky — 1024 people . In addition, 188 mounted and 658 foot nobles and servicemen were recruited in Kazan and other cities. 46 nobles came from Moscow with Khovansky. So, before Khovansky's march, 9025 cavalry and infantry men were concentrated in Kazan, not counting the dragoon regiments. V. Sheremetev had 750 men, F. Esipov 500 men and A. Dmitriev-Mamonov's infantry regiment — 1112 soldiers who fought with the rebels in the district.

On 22 February, Khovansky with the main part of the forces marched from Kazan. In the village of Chepchyugi, he was joined by the regiments of A. Dmitriev-Mamonov and F. Yesipov. In addition, N. Kudryavtsev created a number of detachments from the soldiers left by Khovansky in Karachi and sent them against the rebels. Thus, at the end of February 1708, in the Kazan district, the rebels were opposed, not counting the detachments of "freemen", more than 10 thousand well-armed soldiers and other gun.

A fierce battle ensued between the rebels and government troops. Russian troops inflicted a big defeat to the rebels. The defeat led to the retreat of the rebels from Kazan district.

== Aftermath ==
After the defeat at Kazan, the rebels fled across the Kama River, and those who did not have time to escape, turned themselves in to the authorities. Also, the defeat in the battle led to the temporary cessation of the Bashkir rebellion of 1704–1711.

== See also ==
- Battle of Yuraktau (1707)

== Bibliography ==
- Akmanov, Irek; Kulbakhtin, Nazir; Asphandiyarov, Anvar (2004). История Башкортостана с древнейших времён до наших дней (in Russian). Ufa. ISBN 5-295-03488-7.
- Akmanov, Irek (1993). Башкирские восстания XVII–XVIII веков (in Russian). Ufa. ISBN 5-295-01126-7.
- Zinurov, Rafail (2001). Башкирские восстания и индейские войны – феномен в мировой истории (in Russian). Ufa. ISBN 5-7501-0214-9.

== Links ==
- "Башкиро-татарские восстания: как Москва сыграла на противоречиях с казахами и калмыками и победила". Реальное время. 6 January 2017.
