= Sviyazhsk =

Assumption Cathedral and Monastery of the town-island of Sviyazhsk
UNESCO World Heritage Site
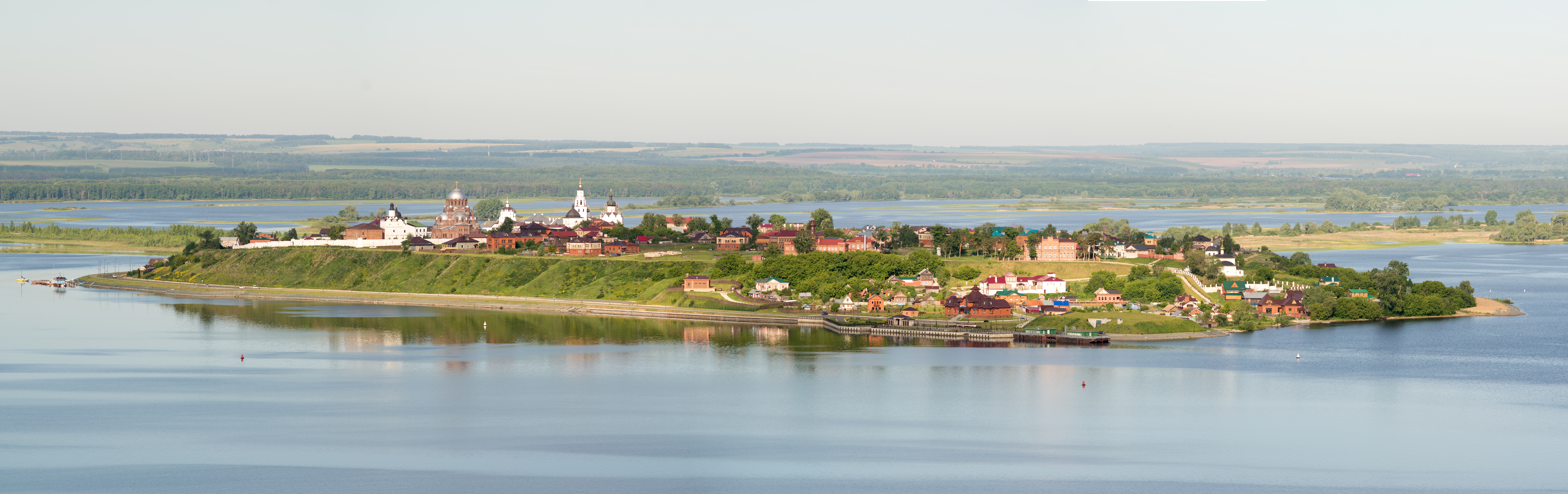
- The island

- Location within Tatarstan Location within European Russia Location within Russia
- Location: Tatarstan, Russia
- Criteria: Cultural: (ii)(iv)
- Reference: 1525
- Inscription: 2017 (41st Session)
- Area: 3.25 ha (8.0 acres)
- Buffer zone: 11,563.9 ha (28,575 acres)
- Coordinates: 55°46′13″N 48°39′10″E

Sviyazhsk (Russian: Свия́жск; Tatar: Зөя) is a rural locality (a selo) in the Republic of Tatarstan, Russia, located at the confluence of the Volga and Sviyaga Rivers. It is often referred to as an island since the 1955 construction of the Kuybyshev Reservoir downstream at Tolyatti, but it is in fact connected to the mainland by a causeway.

In 2017 the Assumption Cathedral and Monastery were added to the list of UNESCO World Heritage Sites.

Sviyazhsk was founded in 1551 as a fortress, which was built within four weeks from parts made in Uglich and transported down the Volga. It became a military base of the Russian army during the siege of Kazan (1552).

Since the 18th century, Sviyazhsk served as a center of an uyezd. In 1920–1927, it was a center of Sviyazhsky Kanton; in 1927–1931—the administrative center of Sviyazhsky District. In 1932, it was demoted to rural status.

For 20 years the NKVD ran a prison and camp in the town. In the mid-1990s remains of some of the dead or executed prisoners were buried in the grounds of the Monastery of the Assumption and a monument (later greatly improved) was raised over them.

There is a school and a club in Sviyazhsk, as well as a monastery associated with the name of Macarius of Unzha.

Sviyazhsk railway station is located 6 kilometers (3.7 mi) west of the island and is linked with Sviyazhsk proper by a highway running along a causeway.

Another way to get there is by a boat from the port of Kazan. In summer every day at 08:30 a fast boat departs at pier 8, and at 09:00 a slow boat. Tickets can be bought on the spot near the kassa.

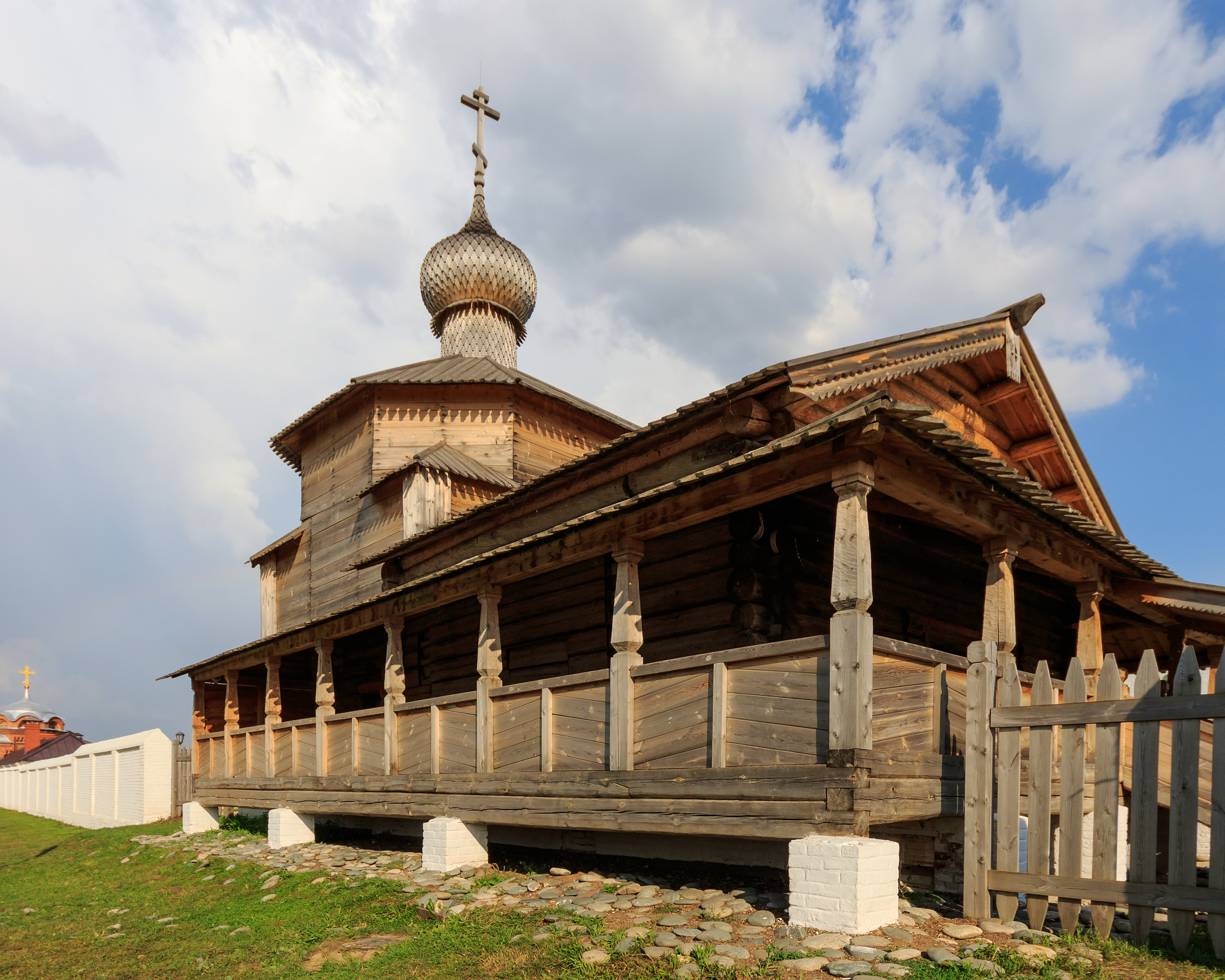
Trinity Church

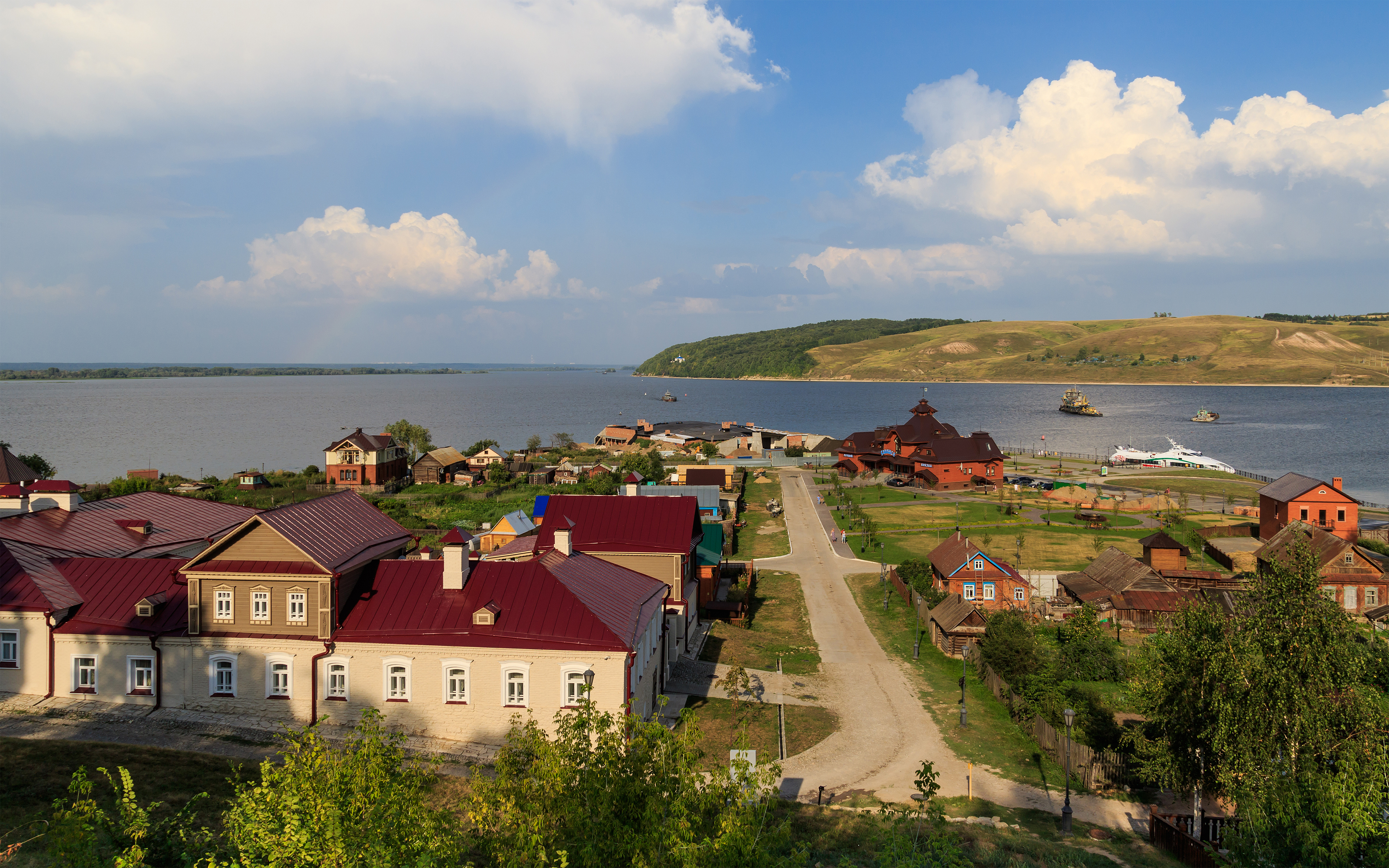
View towards the pier

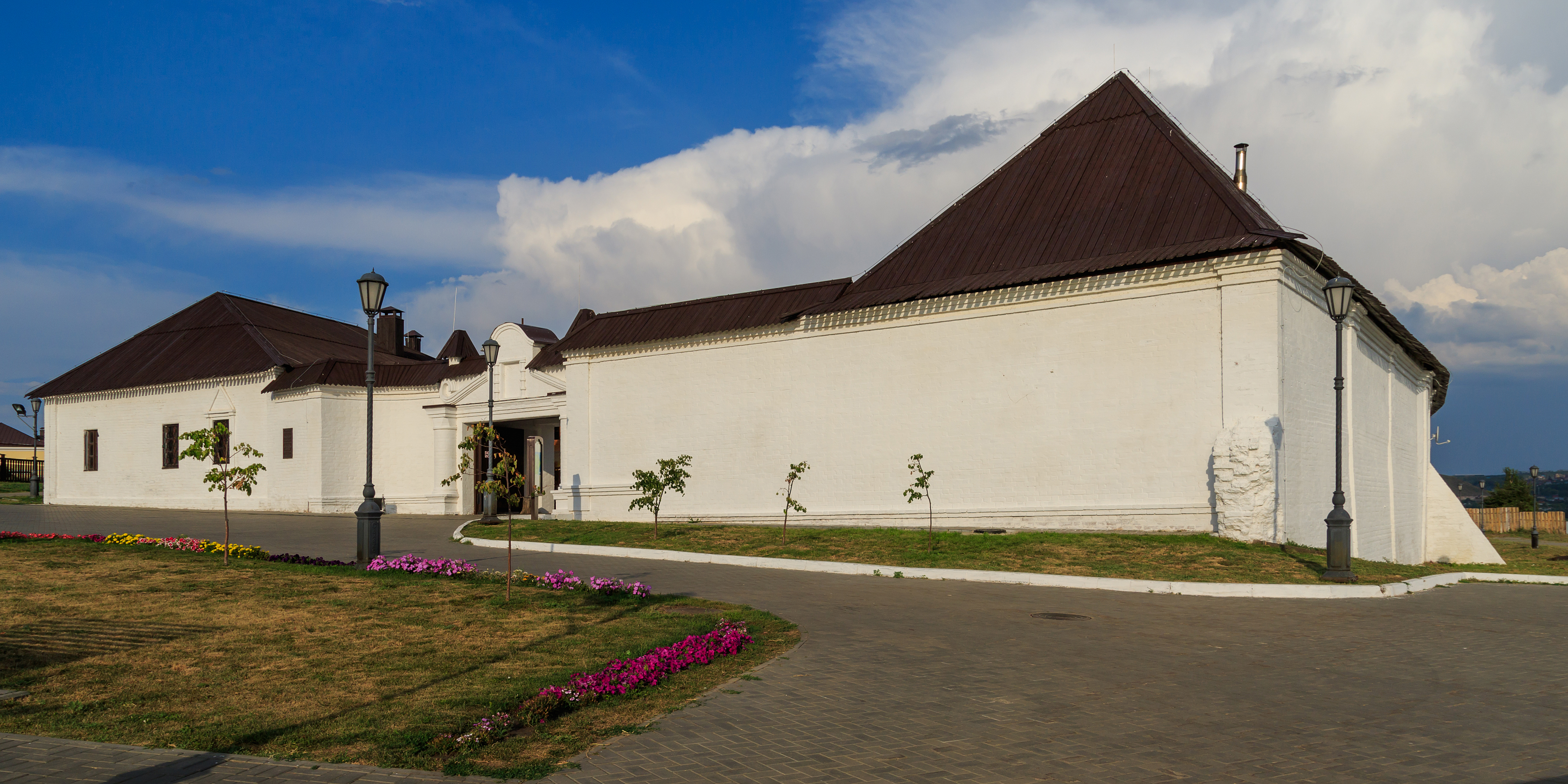
Horseyard of Uspensky Monastery

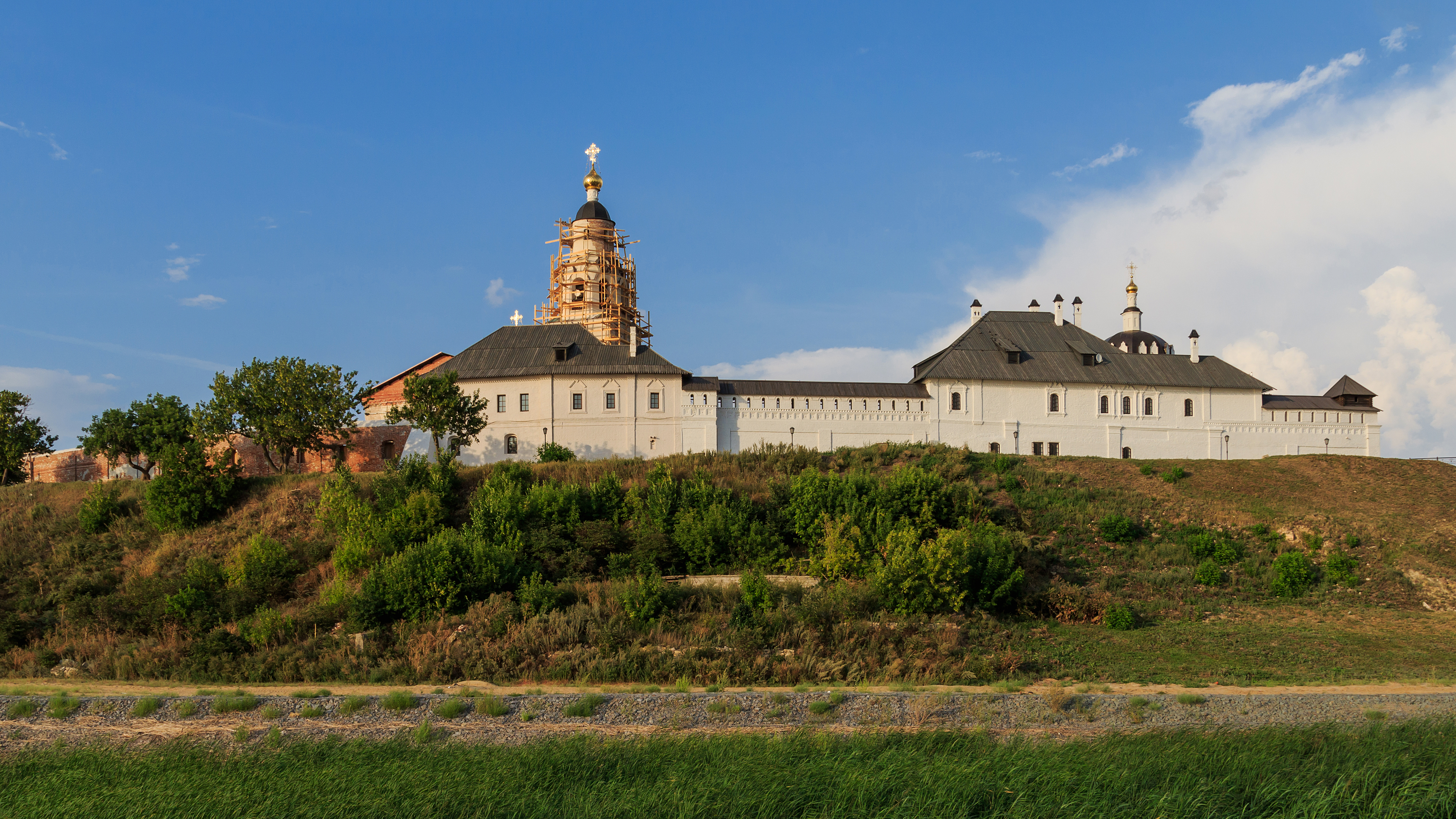
View of Uspensky Monastery

== Historical population ==
- 1989: 747 (Russians - 66%, Tatars - 27%)
- 2000: 258
