= Sviyazhsk Assumption Monastery =

Monastery in Sviyazhsk, Tatarstan, Russia

Coordinates: 55°46′12″N 48°39′08″E

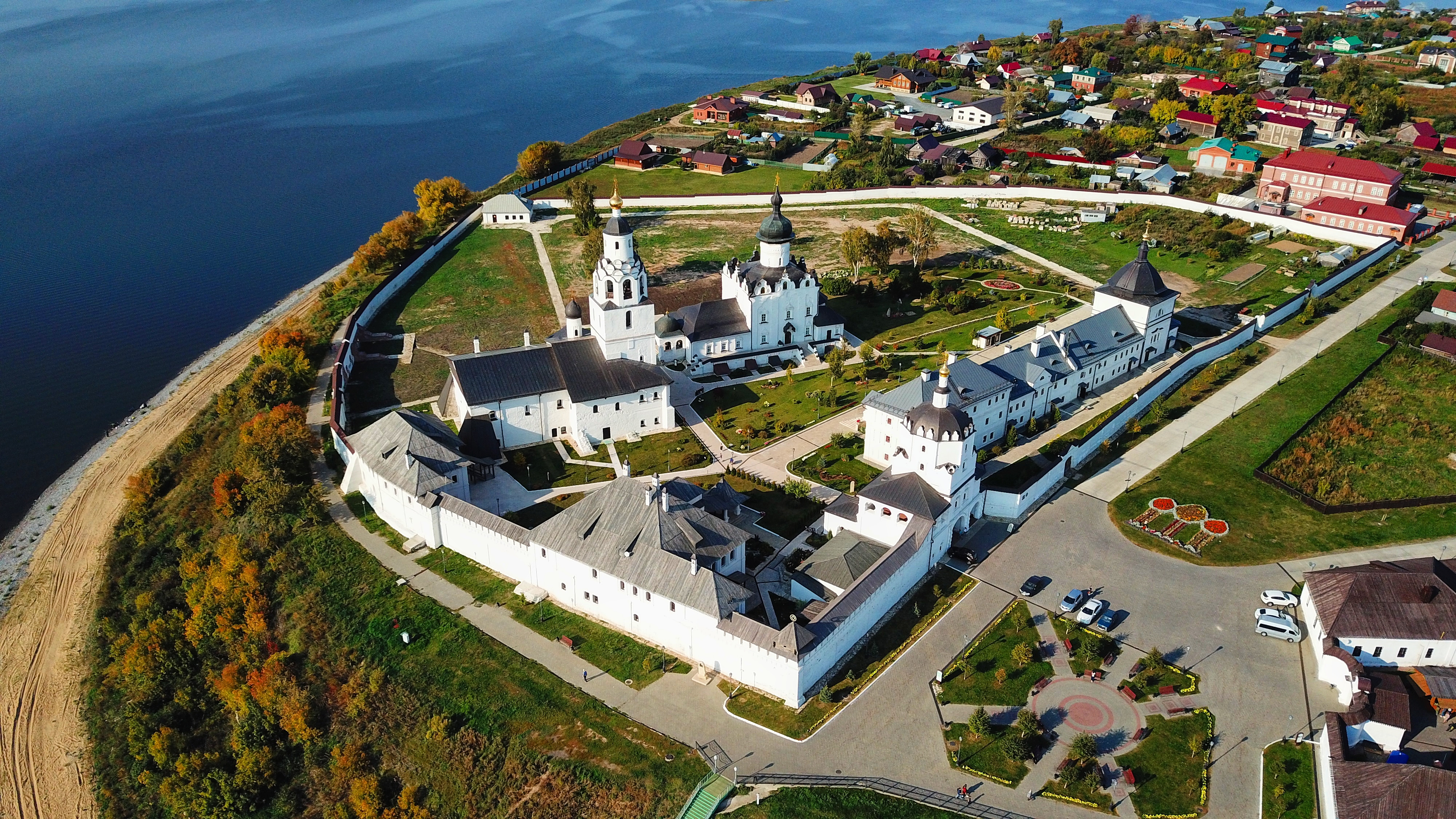
Sviyazhsk Assumption Monastery

The Sviyazhsk Assumption Monastery (Russian: Свияжский Успенский монастырь) in Sviyazhsk, Republic of Tatarstan, Russia is a male Russian Orthodox monastery, included in UNESCO World Heritage list. It is said to be situated on the town-island of Sviyazhsk, but actually there is a road access by earth to the main territory. It was built in 1555, in the same time as Diocese of Kazan was established, and was the main educational and enlightenment center there during XVI—XVIII centuries, in the program of Russian tzar Ivan the Terrible to colonize Volga region. In particular, it had one of the first printing presses in Russia, along with Moscow Print Yard. The frescoes of the Orthodox monastery are among the best preserved in Russia.

== Sources ==
- UNESCO
