= Toratau =

Mountain in Bashkortostan, Russia

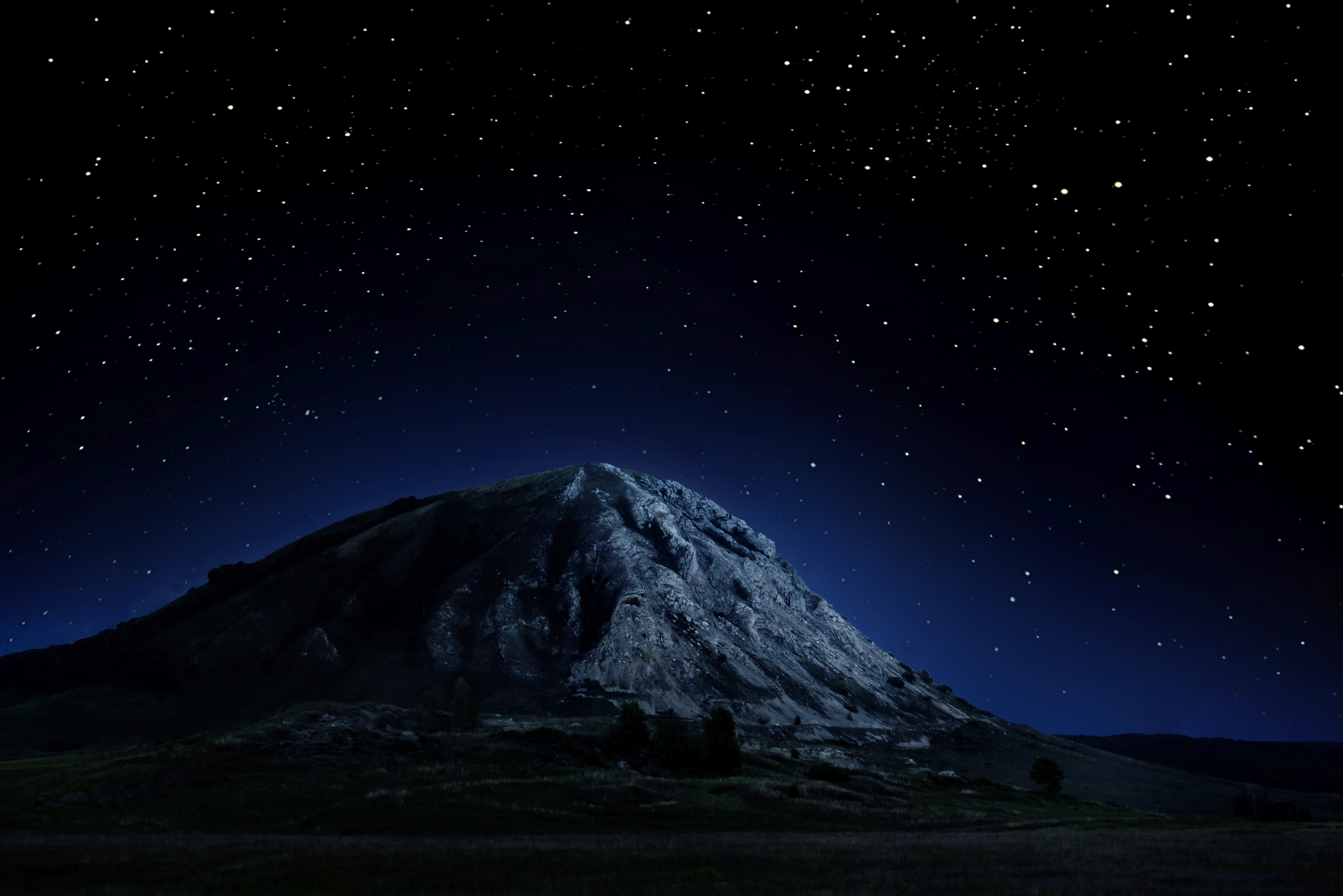

Highest point
- Coordinates: 53°33′16″N 56°05′56″E

Geography
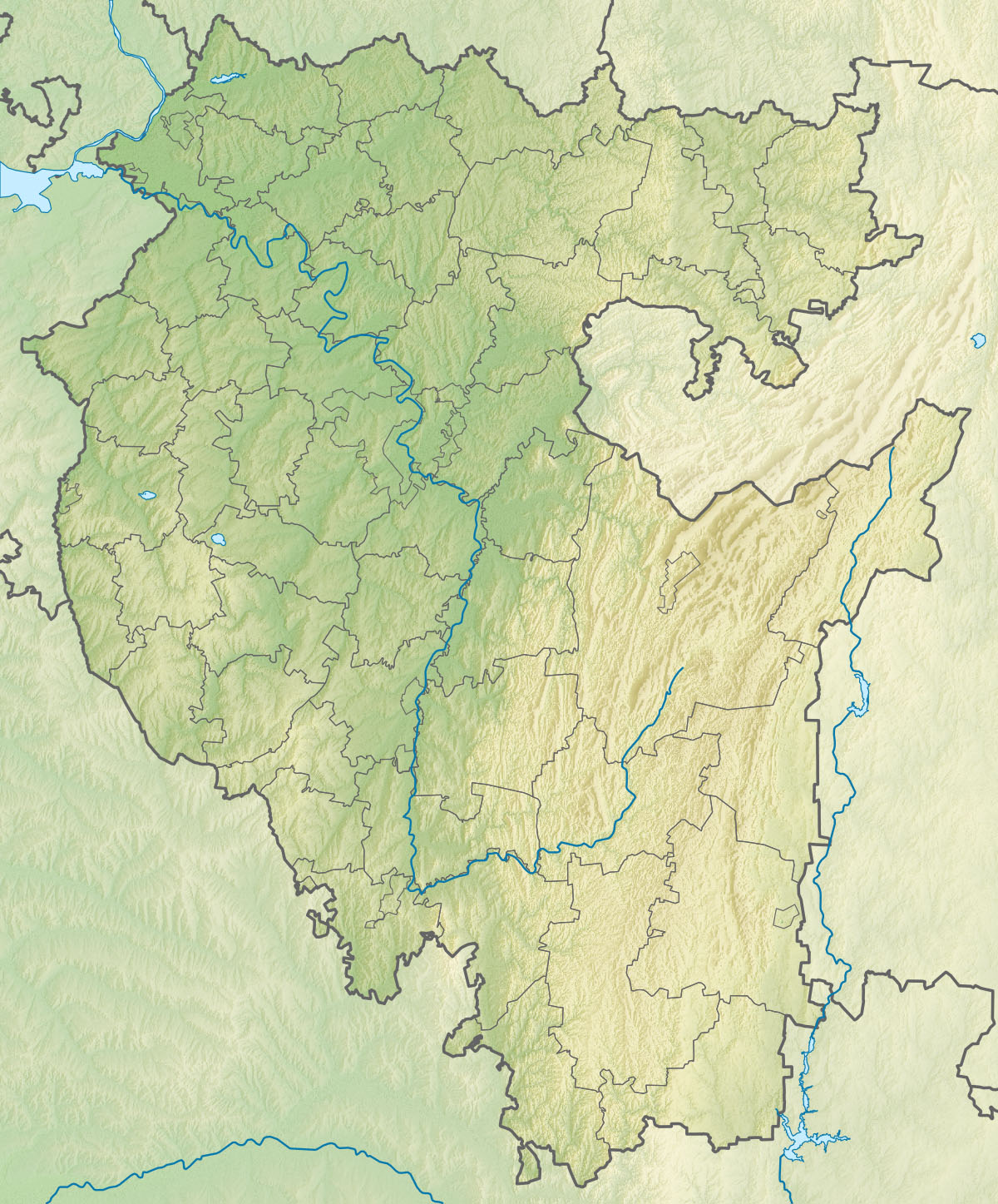
- Location within Bashkortostan Location within European Russia
- Location: Ishimbaysky District, Bashkortostan, Russia
- Parent range: Southern Ural

Toratau (Bashkir: Торатау, romanized: Turatav — «fortress mountain») - one of the four shihans, located in Ishimbaysky District, Bashkortostan, Russia, on the border with the city Sterlitamak. The remainder of the reef, the Lower Permian (Late Paleozoic) reef massif, formed over 230 million years ago in the tropical sea.

This natural monument may be destroyed by The Bashkir soda company and Russian authorities.

== Physiographic characteristic ==
Length - 1 km, width 850 m, height - above the Belaya River- 220 m, above the soil level - 200 m, the absolute height above the sea level - 338 m.

Has a conical shape. Slopes - 20-30 degrees, but do not form rocky ledges. The lower part is covered with screes. At the base of the northern slope of the mountain there are springs, one with sulphurous water.

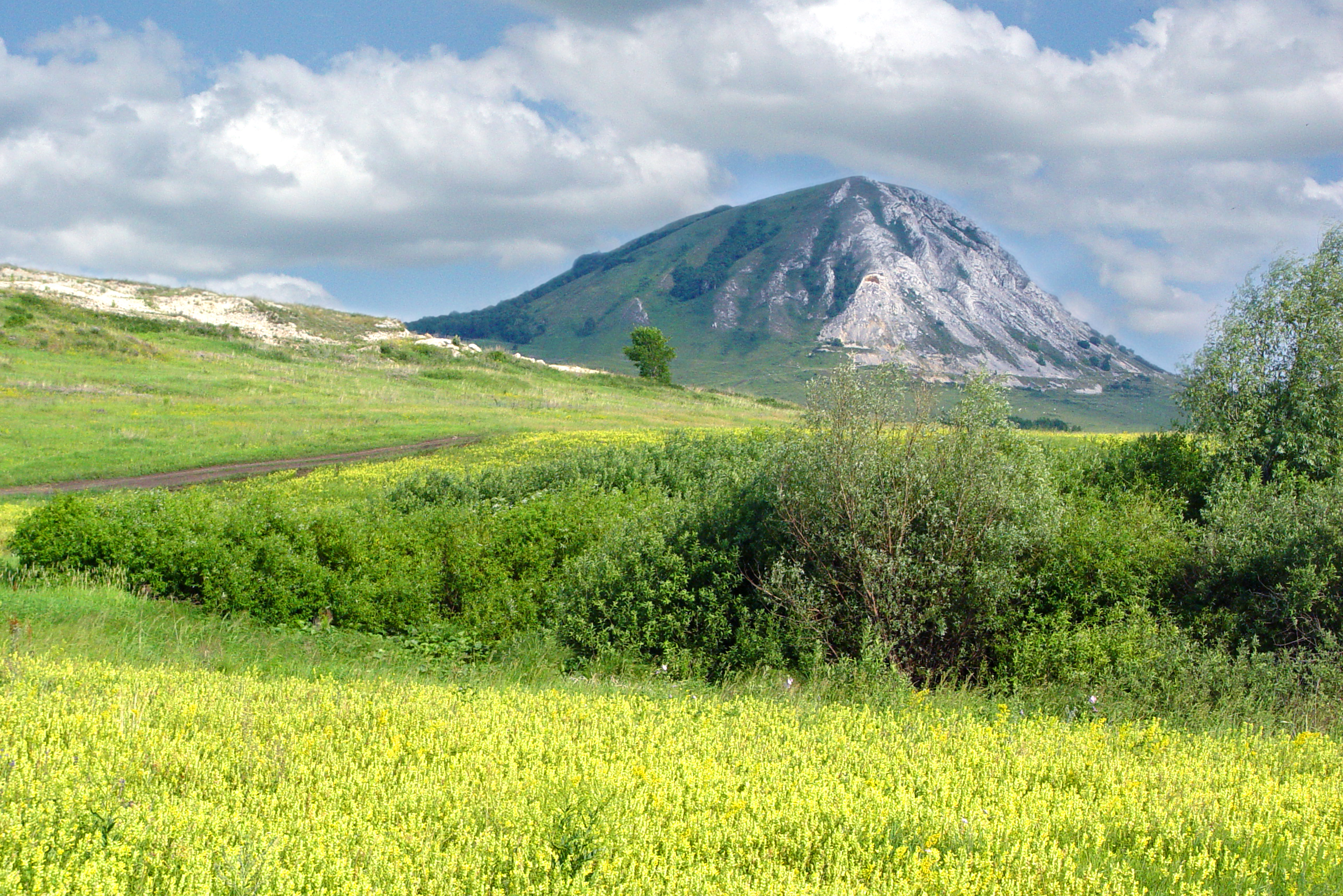

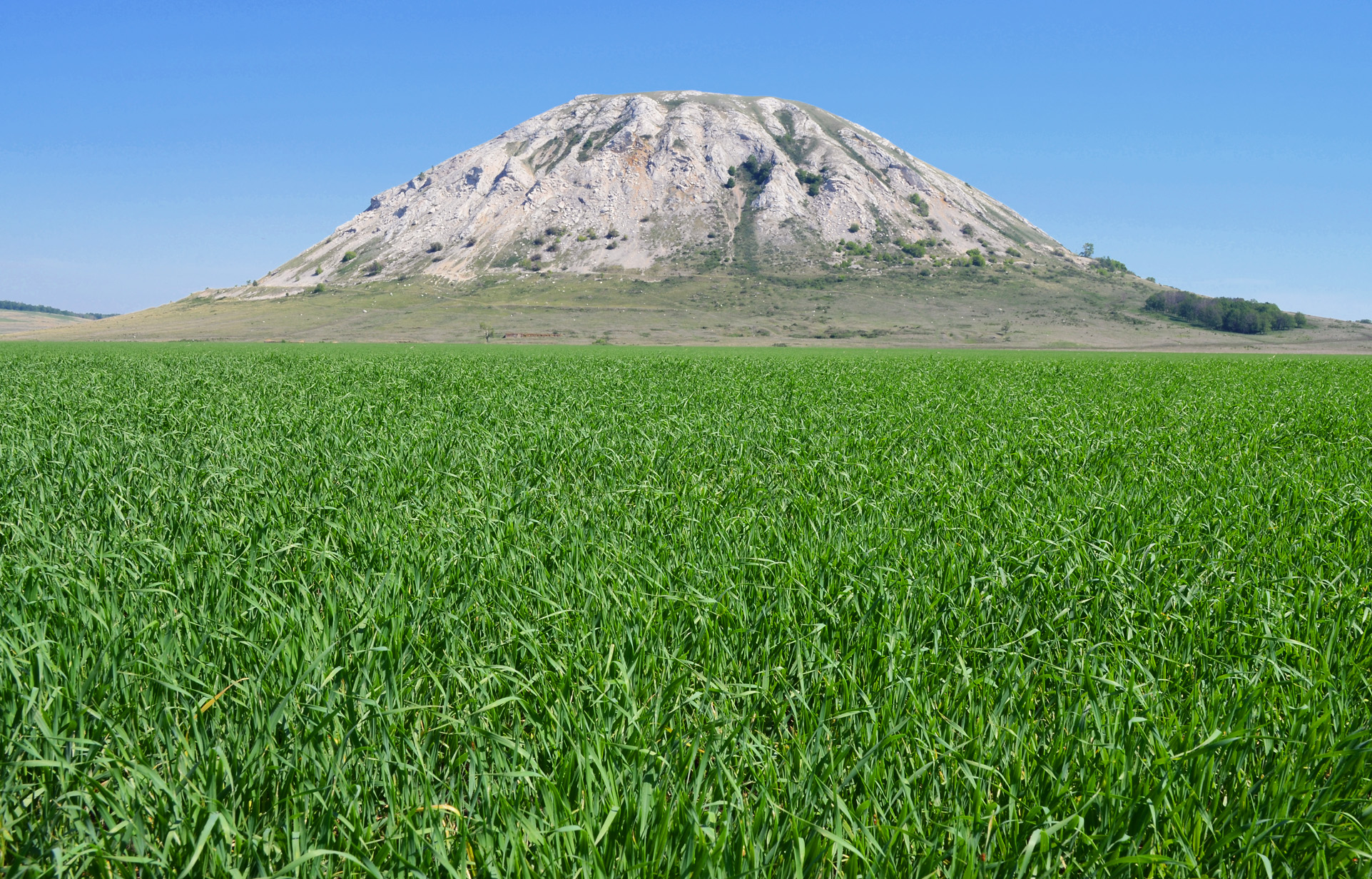
Shihan Toratau in the colors of the Flag of Bashkortostan

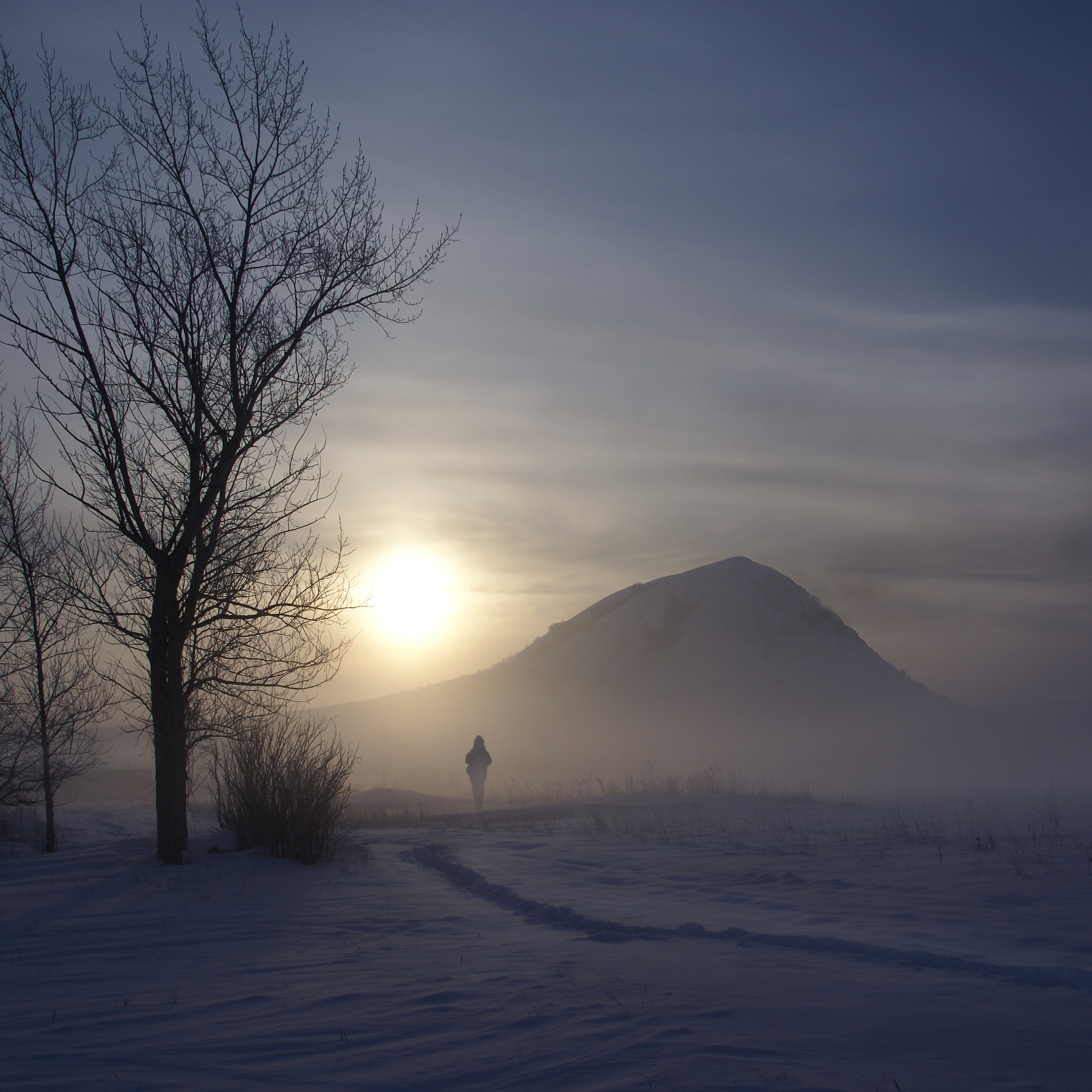
Toratau in winter
