= Kushtau =

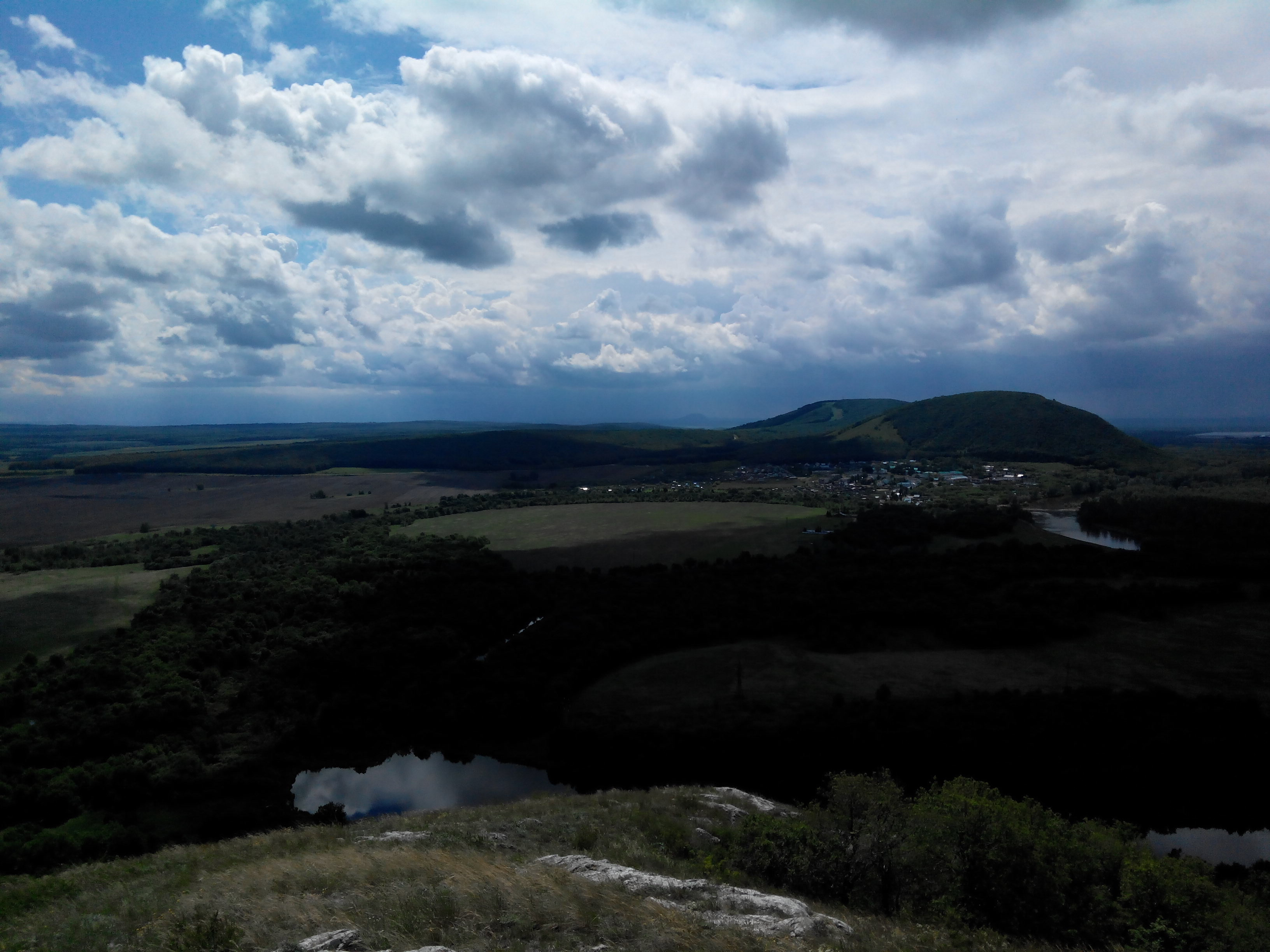

Geography
- Location: Ishimbaysky District, Bashkortostan, Russia
- Parent range: Southern Ural

Kushtau (Bashkir: Ҡуштау — «twin mountain») – is a shihan hill located in Ishimbaysky District along with Sterlitamak city's border, Russia. The mountain is a reef of an ancient tropical sea of the Lower Permian (Late Paleozoic) period formed over 230 million years ago.

== Mining controversy ==
In 2018 the mountain was intended to be developed as quarry to extract chalk by local authorities. The Bashkir soda company was interested in buying mining rights, but the development plan was protested by a group of local eco-activists, who prevented it from getting access to the mountain. Despite an outcry of the Bashkir public, the Shihan's rights of mining were transferred by Radiy Habirov, at the time the head of Bashkortostan, to the Bashkir soda company. In 2020 however after long confrontation between local activists and authorities the latter suspended their mining plans and formally called sides to make a compromise over the mountain's future by offering a new plan to designate the mountain as national reserve for the nature conservation purpose.

== Physiographic characteristic ==
Length - 4 km, width 700–1400 m, height - above the soil level - 251 m, the absolute height above the sea level - 357 m.
