= Yuraktau =

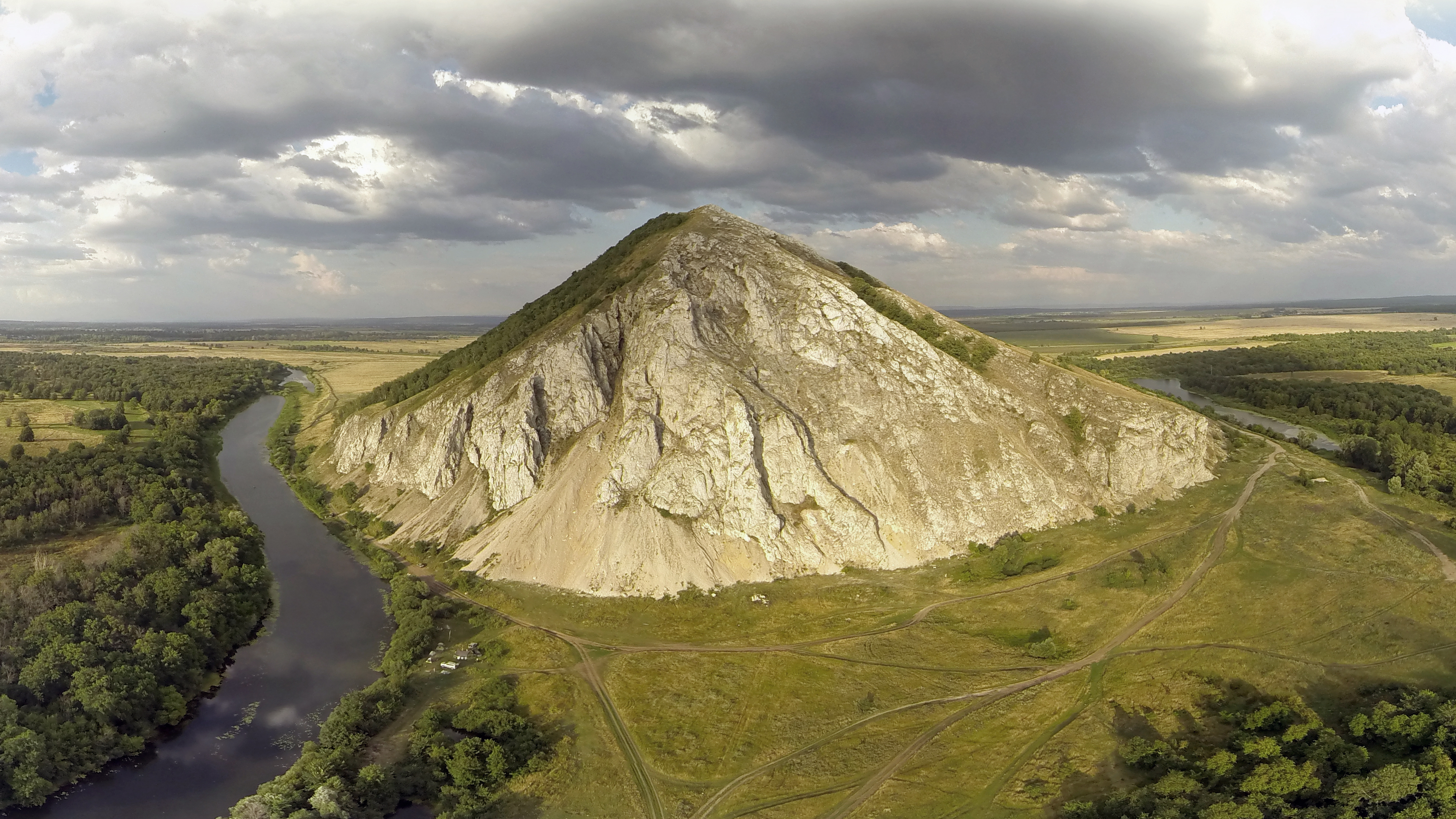
- Yuraktau. View from the height of 85 meters.

Highest point
- Elevation: 338 m (1,109 ft)
- Prominence: 200
- Coordinates: 53°44′30″N 56°05′51″E

Geography
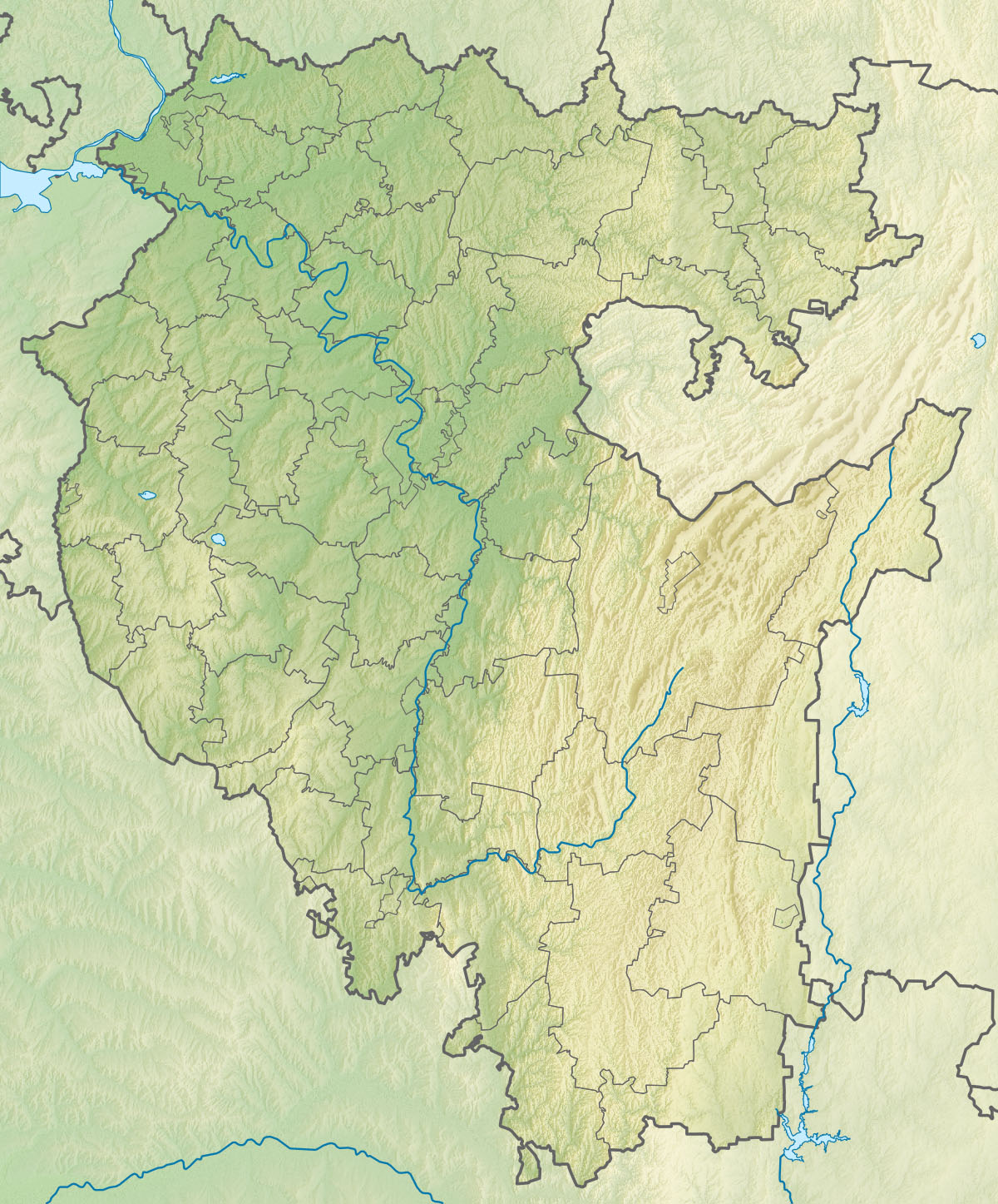
- Location within Bashkortostan Location within European Russia
- Location: Ishimbaysky District, Bashkortostan, Russia
- Parent range: Southern Ural

Yuraktau (Bashkir: Йөрәктау — "heart mountain") is one of the four shihans, located in Ishimbaysky District, on the border with the city Sterlitamak. It is a remainder of a reef, the Lower Permian (Late Paleozoic) reef massif, formed over 230 million years ago in the tropical sea.

This natural monument may be destroyed by The Bashkir soda company and Russian authorities.

== Physiographic characteristics ==
Length - 1 km, width 850 m, height - above the Belaya River- 220 m, above the soil level - 200 m, the absolute height above the sea level - 338 m.

Has a conical shape. Slopes - 20-30 degrees, but do not form rocky ledges. The lower part is covered with scree. At the base of the northern slope of the mountain are springs, one of which is sulphurous.

The lake Moksha is located at the foot of Yuraktau.

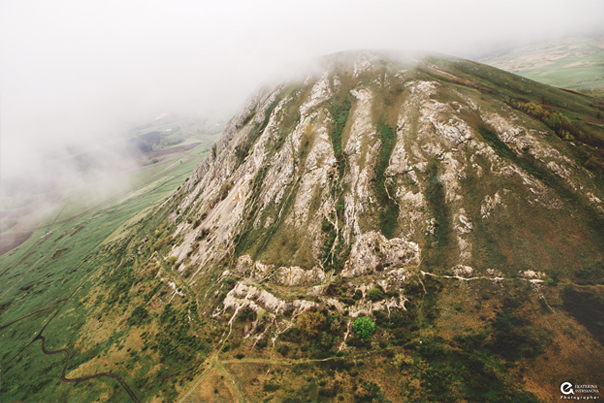

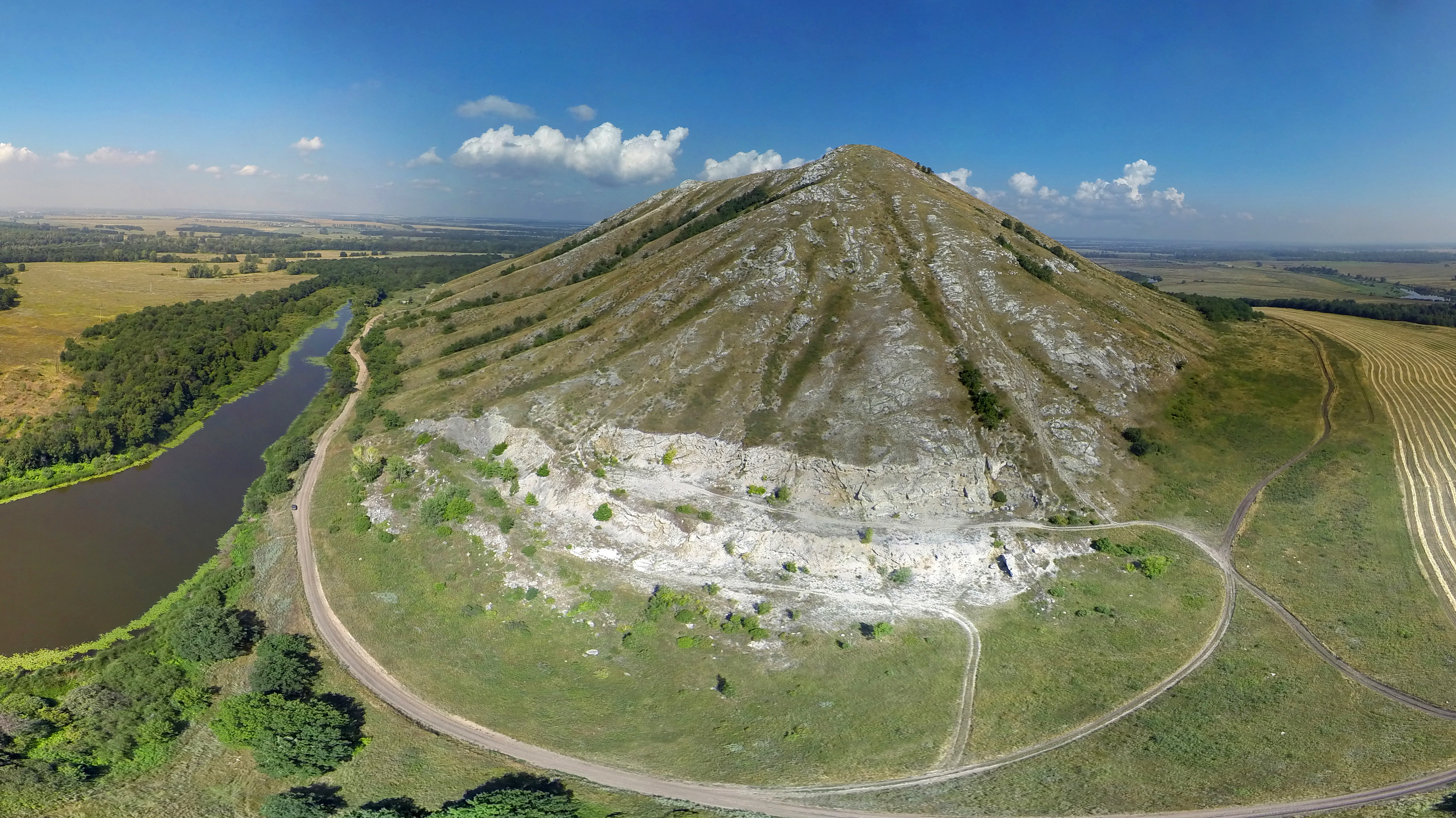
