= Olı Tärbit =

Olı Tärbit Олы Тәрбит
- selo
- Location within Tatarstan
- Country: Russia
- Region: Tatarstan
- District: Qaybıç District
- Time zone: UTC+3:00

Olı Tärbit (Tatar: Олы Тәрбит, romanized: Olı Tärbit) is a rural locality (a selo) in Qaybıç District, Tatarstan. The population was 608 as of 2010.

== Geography ==
Olı Tärbit is located 38 km west of Olı Qaybıç, district's administrative centre, and 145 km southwest of Qazan, republic's capital, by road.

== History ==
The village was established in the 17th century.

From 18th to the first half of the 19th centuries village's residents belonged to the social estate of state peasants.

By the beginning of the twentieth century, village had a church, a madrasa, 2 parochial schools, a watermill, 2 grain scourers, 2 small shops and a bazaar on Wednesdays.

Before the creation of the Tatar ASSR in 1920 was a part of Çuyıl Uyezd of Qazan Governorate. Since 1920 was a part of Chuvash Autonomous Oblast; since ́1921 in Tatar ASSR's Bua (1921–1922) and Zöyä (1922–1927) cantons; after the creation of districts in Tatar ASSR (Tatarstan) in Qaybıç (Ölcän in 1927) (1927–1944), Külle İl (1944–1956), Qaybıç (1956–1963), Bua (1963–1964), Apas (1964–1991) and Qaybıç districts.
