= İske Tärbit =

İske Tärbit Иске Тәрбит
- selo
- Location within Tatarstan
- Country: Russia
- Region: Tatarstan
- District: Qaybıç District
- Time zone: UTC+3:00

İske Tärbit (Tatar: Иске Тәрбит, romanized: İske Tärbit) is a rural locality (a selo) in Qaybıç District, Tatarstan. The population was 571 as of 2010.

== Geography ==
İske Tärbit is located 34 km northwest of Olı Qaybıç, district's administrative centre, and 143 km southwest of Qazan, republic's capital, by road.

== History ==
The earliest known record of the settlement dates from 1646.

From 18th to the first half of the 19th centuries village's residents belonged to the social estate of state peasants.

By the beginning of the twentieth century, village had a church, a zemstvo school, 2 literacy schools, 2 watermills, 4 grain scourers, a blacksmith shop and 2 small shops.

Before the creation of the Tatar ASSR in 1920 was a part of Çuyıl Uyezd of Qazan Governorate. Since 1920 was a part of Chuvash Autonomous Oblast; since ́1921 in Tatar ASSR's Bua (1921–1922) and Zöyä (1922–1927) cantons; after the creation of districts in Tatar ASSR (Tatarstan) in Qaybıç (Ölcän in 1927) (1927–1944), Külle İl (1944–1956), Qaybıç (1956–1963), Bua (1963–1964), Apas (1964–1991) and Qaybıç districts.
