= Yaña Bua =

Yaña Bua Яңа Буа
- derevnya
- Location within Tatarstan
- Country: Russia
- Region: Tatarstan
- District: Qaybıç District
- Time zone: UTC+3:00

Yaña Bua (Tatar: Яңа Буа, romanized: Yaña Bua) is a rural locality (a derevnya (awıl)) in Qaybıç District, Tatarstan. The population was 129 as of 2010.

== Geography ==
Yaña Bua is located 34 km southwest of Olı Qaybıç, district's administrative centre, and 138 km southwest of Qazan, republic's capital, by road.

== History ==
The earliest known record of the settlement dates from 1646.

From 18th to the first half of the 19th centuries village's residents belonged to the social estate of state peasants.

By the beginning of the twentieth century, village had a Saint Gourias Brotherhood's school and 2 grain scourers.

Before the creation of the Tatar ASSR in 1920 was a part of Täteş Uyezd of Qazan Governorate. Since 1920 was a part of Tatar ASSR's Täteş (1921–1922) and Zöyä (1922–1927) cantons; after the creation of districts in Tatar ASSR (Tatarstan) in Qaybıç (Ölcän in 1927) (1927–1944), Külle İl (1944–1956), Qaybıç (1956–1963), Bua (1963–1964), Apas (1964–1991) and Qaybıç districts.
