= İske Bua =

İske Bua Иске Буа
- selo
- Location within Tatarstan
- Country: Russia
- Region: Tatarstan
- District: Qaybıç District
- Time zone: UTC+3:00

İske Bua (Tatar: Иске Буа, romanized: İske Bua) is a rural locality (a selo) in Qaybıç District, Tatarstan. The population was 21 as of 2010.

== Geography ==
İske Bua is located 35 km southwest of Olı Qaybıç, district's administrative centre, and 140 km southwest of Qazan, republic's capital, by road.

== History ==
The village was established in the 17th century.

From 18th to the first half of the 19th centuries village's residents belonged to the social estate of state peasants.

By the beginning of the twentieth century, village had a small shop.

Before the creation of the Tatar ASSR in 1920 was a part of Täteş Uyezd of Qazan Governorate. Since 1920 was a part of Tatar ASSR's Täteş (1921–1922) and Zöyä (1922–1927) cantons; after the creation of districts in Tatar ASSR (Tatarstan) in Qaybıç (Ölcän in 1927) (1927–1944), Külle İl (1944–1956), Qaybıç (1956–1963), Bua (1963–1964), Apas (1964–1991) and Qaybıç districts.
