= Mälki =

Mälki Мәлки
- selo
- Location within Tatarstan
- Country: Russia
- Region: Tatarstan
- District: Qaybıç District
- Time zone: UTC+3:00

Mälki (Tatar: Мәлки, romanized: Mälki) is a rural locality (a selo) in Qaybıç District, Tatarstan. The population was 567 as of 2010.

== Geography ==
Mälki is located 31 km southwest of Olı Qaybıç, district's administrative centre, and 135 km southwest of Qazan, republic's capital, by road.

== History ==
The village was established in the 17th century.

From 18th to the first half of the 19th centuries village's residents belonged to the social estate of state peasants.

By the beginning of the twentieth century, village had a church, a school of the Ministry of National Education, a literacy school, 2 grain scourers.

Before the creation of the Tatar ASSR in 1920 was a part of Çuyıl Uyezd of Qazan Governorate. Since 1920 was a part of Chuvash Autonomous Oblast; since ́1921 in Tatar ASSR's Bua (1921–1922) and Zöyä (1922–1927) cantons; after the creation of districts in Tatar ASSR (Tatarstan) in Qaybıç (Ölcän in 1927) (1927–1944), Külle İl (1944–1956), Qaybıç (1956–1963), Bua (1963–1964), Apas (1964–1991) and Qaybıç districts.
