= Çüti, Kaybitsky District =

Çüti Чүти
- selo
- Location within Tatarstan
- Country: Russia
- Region: Tatarstan
- District: Qaybıç District
- Time zone: UTC+3:00

Çüti (Tatar: Чүти, romanized: Çüti) is a rural locality (a selo) in Qaybıç District, Tatarstan. The population was 673 as of 2010.

== Geography ==
Çüti, located in Kaybitsky District, is situated 36 km west of Olı Qaybıç, the district's administrative centre, and 142 km southwest of Qazan, republic's capital, by road.

== History ==
The earliest known record of the settlement dates from 1646.

From 18th to the first half of the 19th centuries village's residents belonged to the social estate of state peasants.

By the beginning of the twentieth century, village had 2 mosques, a madrasa, 2 windmills, 4 grain scourers and 10 small shops.

Before the creation of the Tatar ASSR in 1920 was a part of Çuyıl Uyezd of Qazan Governorate. Since 1920 was a part of Chuvash Autonomous Oblast; since ́1921 in Tatar ASSR's Bua (1921–1922) and Zöyä (1922–1927) cantons; after the creation of districts in Tatar ASSR (Tatarstan) in Qaybıç (Ölcän in 1927) (1927–1944), Külle İl (1944–1956), Qaybıç (1956–1963), Bua (1963–1964), Apas (1964–1991) and Qaybıç districts.
