= Afanas =

Afanas Афанас
- derevnya
- Location within Tatarstan
- Country: Russia
- Region: Tatarstan
- District: Qaybıç District
- Time zone: UTC+3:00

Afanas (Tatar: Афанас, romanized: Afanas) is a rural locality (a derevnya) in Qaybıç District, Tatarstan. The population was 139 as of 2010.

== Geography ==
Afanas is located 5 km north of Olı Qaybıç, the district's administrative centre, and 109 km southwest of Qazan, the republic's capital, by road.

== History ==
The village was established in the 18th century.

Until 1860s village's residents belonged to the social estate of privately owned peasants.

Before the creation of the Tatar ASSR in 1920 Afanas was a part of Zöyä Uyezd of the Qazan Governorate. Since 1920 Afanas was a part of Zöyä Canton; after the creation of districts in Tatar ASSR (Tatarstan) in Qaybıç (Ölcän) in 1927 (1927–1963), Bua (1963–1964), Apas (1964–1991) and Qaybıç districts.
