= Baymorza =

Baymorza Байморза
- derevnya
- Location within Tatarstan
- Country: Russia
- Region: Tatarstan
- District: Qaybıç District
- Time zone: UTC+3:00

Baymorza (Tatar: Байморза, romanized: Baymorza) is a rural locality (a derevnya (awıl)) in Qaybıç District, Tatarstan. The population was 132 as of 2010.

== Geography ==
Baymorza is located 34 km southwest of Olı Qaybıç, district's administrative centre, and 141 km southwest of Qazan, republic's capital, by road.

== History ==
The village was established in the 18th century.

From 18th to the first half of the 19th centuries village's residents belonged to the social estate of state peasants.

By the beginning of the twentieth century, village had a mosque, a mekteb, a church, a zemstvo school, a Saint Gourias Brotherhood's school, 2 windmills, 3 grain scourers and 3 small shops.

Before the creation of the Tatar ASSR in 1920 was a part of Täteş Uyezd of Qazan Governorate. Since 1920 was a part of Tatar ASSR's Täteş Canton; after the creation of districts in Tatar ASSR (Tatarstan) in Qaybıç (Ölcän in 1927) (1927–1944), Külle İl (1944–1956), Qaybıç (1956–1963), Bua (1963–1964), Apas (1964–1991) and Qaybıç districts.
