= Keçe Qaybıç =

Keçe Qaybıç Кече Кайбыч
- selo
- Location within Tatarstan
- Country: Russia
- Region: Tatarstan
- District: Qaybıç District
- Time zone: UTC+3:00

Keçe Qaybıç (Tatar: Кече Кайбыч, romanized: Keçe Qaybıç) is a rural locality (a selo) in Qaybıç District, Tatarstan. The population was 441 as of 2010.

== Geography ==
Keçe Qaybıç is located 4 km south of Olı Qaybıç, district's administrative centre, and 111 km southwest of Qazan, republic's capital, by road.

== History ==
The village already existed during the period of the Khanate of Qazan.

From 18th to the first half of the 19th centuries village's residents belonged to the social estate of state peasants.

By the beginning of the twentieth century, village had a mosque, a madrasa, 2 watermills, a manufactory and 4 small shops.

Before the creation of the Tatar ASSR in 1920 was a part of Zöyä Uyezd of Qazan Governorate. Since 1920 was a part of Zöyä Canton; after the creation of districts in Tatar ASSR (Tatarstan) in Qaybıç (Ölcän in 1927) (1927–1963), Bua (1963–1964), Apas (1964–1991) and Qaybıç districts.
