= Saltığan, Kaybitsky District =

Saltığan Салтыган
- selo
- Location within Tatarstan
- Country: Russia
- Region: Tatarstan
- District: Qaybıç District
- Time zone: UTC+3:00

Saltığan (Tatar: Салтыган, romanized: Saltığan) is a rural locality (a selo) in Qaybıç District, Tatarstan. The population was 241 as of 2010.

== Geography ==
Saltığan, Kaybitsky District is located 18 km northwest of Olı Qaybıç, district's administrative centre, and 122 km southwest of Qazаn, republic's capital, by road.

== History ==
The village already existed during the period of the Khanate of Qazan.

From 18th to the first half of the 19th centuries village's residents belonged to the social estate of state peasants.

By the beginning of the twentieth century, village had a mosque, 2 watermills, 3 windmills and 3 small shops.

Before the creation of the Tatar ASSR in 1920 was a part of Zöyä Uyezd of Qazan Governorate. Since 1920 was a part of Zöyä Canton; after the creation of districts in Tatar ASSR (Tatarstan) in Qaybıç (Ölcän) in 1927 (1927–1963), Bua (1963–1964), Apas (1964–1991) and Qaybıç districts.
