= Bärlebaşı =

Bärlebaşı Бәрлебашы
- selo
- Location within Tatarstan
- Country: Russia
- Region: Tatarstan
- District: Qaybıç District
- Time zone: UTC+3:00

Bärlebaşı (Tatar: Бәрлебашы, romanized: Bärlebaşı) is a rural locality (a selo) in Qaybıç District, Tatarstan. The population was 208 as of 2010.

== Geography ==
Bärlebaşı is located 7 km south of Olı Qaybıç, district's administrative centre, and 115 km southwest of Qazan, republic's capital, by road.

== History ==
The village was established in the 16th century.

From 18th to the first half of the 19th centuries village's residents belonged to the social estate of state peasants.

By the beginning of the twentieth century, village had a mosque, a madrasa, a church, a zemstvo school, a pot shop and 6 small shops.

Before the creation of the Tatar ASSR in 1920 was a part of Zöyä Uyezd of Qazan Governorate. Since 1920 was a part of Zöyä Canton; after the creation of districts in Tatar ASSR (Tatarstan) in Qaybıç (Ölcän in 1927) (1927–1963), Bua (1963–1964), Apas (1964–1991) and Qaybıç districts.
