= Çükri Alan =

Çükri Alan Чүкри Алан
- derevnya
- Location within Tatarstan
- Country: Russia
- Region: Tatarstan
- District: Qaybıç District
- Time zone: UTC+3:00

Çükri Alan (Tatar: Чүкри Алан, romanized: Çükri Alan) is a rural locality (a derevnya) in Qaybıç District, Tatarstan. The population was 52 as of 2010.

== Geography ==
Çükri Alan is located 20 km southeast of Olı Qaybıç, district's administrative centre, and 106 km southwest of Qazan, republic's capital, by road.

== History ==
The village was established in the 18th century.

From 18th to the first half of the 19th centuries village's residents belonged to the social estate of state peasants.

By the beginning of the twentieth century, village had a mosque, a windmill and 3 small shops.

Before the creation of the Tatar ASSR in 1920 was a part of Zöyä Uyezd of Qazan Governorate. Since 1920 was a part of Zöyä Canton; after the creation of districts in Tatar ASSR (Tatarstan) in Qaybıç (Ölcän) in 1927 (1927–1963), Bua (1963–1964), Apas (1964–1991) and Qaybıç districts.
