= Şüşirmä =

Şüşirmä Шүширмә
- derevnya
- Location within Tatarstan
- Coordinates: 55.489912°N 48.355773°E
- Country: Russia
- Region: Tatarstan
- District: Qaybıç District
- Time zone: UTC+3:00

Şüşirmä (Tatar: Шүширмә, romanized: Şüşirmä) is a rural locality (a derevnya) in Qaybıç District, Tatarstan. The population was 254 as of 2010.

== Geography ==
Şüşirmä is located 25 km (16 mi) northeast of Olı Qaybıç, district's administrative centre, and 93 km (58 mi) southwest of Qazan, republic's capital, by road.

== History ==
The earliest known record of the settlement dates from mid-17th century.

From 18th to the first half of the 19th centuries village's residents belonged to the social estate of state peasants.

By the beginning of the twentieth century, village had a mosque, a mekteb, two windmills, a grain scourer and four small shops.

Before the creation of the Tatar ASSR in 1920 was a part of Zöyä Uyezd of Qazan Governorate. Since 1920 was a part of Zöyä Canton; after the creation of districts in Tatar ASSR (Tatarstan) in Qaybıç (Ölcän in 1927) (1927–1963), Bua (1963–1964), Apas (1964–1991) and Qaybıç districts.
