= İmänle Bortas =

İmänle Bortas Имәнле Бортас
- derevnya
- Location within Tatarstan
- Country: Russia
- Region: Tatarstan
- District: Qaybıç District
- Time zone: UTC+3:00

İmänle Bortas (Tatar: Имәнле Бортас, romanized: İmänle Bortas) is a rural locality (a derevnya) in Qaybıç District, Tatarstan. The population was 164 as of 2010.

== Geography ==
İmänle Bortas is located 12 km northeast of Olı Qaybıç, district's administrative centre, and 110 km southwest of Qazan, republic's capital, by road.

== History ==
The earliest known record of the settlement dates from 1619.

From 18th to the first half of the 19th centuries village's residents belonged to the social estate of state peasants.

By the beginning of the twentieth century, village had a mosque, 3 windmills, a grain scourer and 3 small shops.

Before the creation of the Tatar ASSR in 1920 was a part of Zöyä Uyezd of Qazan Governorate. Since 1920 was a part of Zöyä Canton; after the creation of districts in Tatar ASSR (Tatarstan) in Qaybıç (Ölcän in 1927) (1927–1963), Bua (1963–1964), Apas (1964–1991) and Qaybıç districts.
