= Keçe Ursaq =

Keçe Ursaq Кече Урсак
- selo
- Location within Tatarstan
- Country: Russia
- Region: Tatarstan
- District: Qaybıç District
- Time zone: UTC+3:00

Keçe Ursaq (Tatar: Кече Урсак, romanized: Keçe Ursaq) is a rural locality (a selo) in Qaybıç District, Tatarstan. The population was 111 as of 2010.

== Geography ==
Keçe Ursaq is located 9 km southeast of Olı Qaуbıç, district's administrative centre, and 113 km southwest of Qazаn, the republic's capital, by road.

== History ==
The village was established in the 18th century.

From the 18th century to the first half of the 19th century, the village's residents belonged to the social estate of state peasants.

By the beginning of the twentieth century, the village had a mosque, a madrasa, 3 watermills and 3 small shops.

Before the creation of the Tatar ASSR in 1920, it was a part of Zöyä Uyezd of Qazan Governorate. Since 1920, it was a part of Zöyä Canton; after the creation of districts in Tatar ASSR (Tatarstan) in Qaybıç (Ölcän) in 1927 (1927–1963), Bua (1963–1964), Apas (1964–1991) and Qaybıç districts.
