= Quşkül =

Quşkül Кушкүл
- derevnya
- Location within Tatarstan
- Country: Russia
- Region: Tatarstan
- District: Qaybıç District
- Time zone: UTC+3:00

Quşkül (Tatar: Кушкүл, romanized: Quşkül) is a rural locality (a derevnya) in Qaybıç District, Tatarstan. The population was 102 as of 2018.

== Geography ==
Quşkül is located 24 km northwest of Olı Qaybıç, district's administrative centre, and 132 km southwest of Qazan, republic's capital, by road.

== History ==
The village was established in 1927.

After the creation of districts in Tatar ASSR (Tatarstan) in Qaybıç (Ölcän in 1927) (1927–1944), Külle İl (1944–1956), Qaybıç (1956–1963), Bua (1963–1964), Apas (1964–1991) and Qaybıç districts.
