= Qoşman =

Qoşman Кошман
- Selo
- Location within Tatarstan
- Country: Russia
- Region: Tatarstan
- District: Qaybıç District
- Time zone: UTC+3:00

Qoşman (Tatar: Кошман, romanized: Qoşman, Russian: Кушманы) is a rural locality (a selo) in Qaybıç District, Tatarstan. The population was 765 as of 2010.

== Geography ==
Qoşman is located 5 km to the east of Olı Qaybıç, district's administrative centre, and 104 km southwest of Qazan, republic's capital, by road.

== History ==
The village of Qoşman was created by merging two villages, Olı Qoşman and Keçe Qoşman. Both of them existed already during the period of the Khanate of Qazan.

From 17th to first half of the 19th centuries both villages' residents belonged to the social estate of state peasants.

Before the creation of Tatar ASSR in 1920 both villages were a part of Zöyä Uyezd of Qazan Governorate. Since 1920 was a part of Zöyä Canton; after the creation of districts in Tatar ASSR (Tatarstan) in Ölcän (later Qaybıç) (1927–1963), Bua (1963–1965), Apas (1965–1991) and Qaybıç districts.

== Notable people ==
Qoşman is a birthplace of Äbrär Säğidi, a poet, and Äbrär Borhanof, Hero of Socialist Labour.
