= Olı Ursaq =

Olı Ursaq Олы Урсак
- selo
- Location within Tatarstan
- Country: Russia
- Region: Tatarstan
- District: Qaybıç District
- Time zone: UTC+3:00

Olı Ursaq (Tatar: Олы Урсак, romanized: Olı Ursaq) is a rural locality (a selo) in Qaybıç District, Tatarstan. The population was 360 as of 2010.

== Geography ==
Olı Ursaq is located 16 km east of Olı Qaybıç, district's administrative centre, and 109 km southwest of Qazan, republic's capital, by road.

== History ==
The village was established in the 18th century.

Until the first half of the 19th century village's residents belonged to the social estate of state peasants.

By the beginning of the twentieth century, village had 2 mosques, a Russian-Tatar school of the Ministry of National Education, a windmill, 2 watermills and 8 small shops.

Before the creation of the Tatar ASSR in 1920 was a part of Zöyä Uyezd of Qazan Governorate. Since 1920 was a part of Zöyä Canton; after the creation of districts in Tatar ASSR (Tatarstan) in Qaybıç (Ölçan in 1927) (1927–1959), Bua (1963–1964), Apas (1964–1991) and Qaybıç districts.
