= Borındıq, Kaybitsky District =

Borındıq Борындык
- selo
- Location within Tatarstan
- Country: Russia
- Region: Tatarstan
- District: Qaybıç District
- Time zone: UTC+3:00

Borındıq (Tatar: Борындык, romanized: Borındıq) is a rural locality (a selo) in Qaybıç District, Tatarstan. The population was 594 as of 2010.

== Geography ==
Borındıq, Kaybitsky District is located 24 km northeast of Olı Qaybıç, district's administrative centre, and 88 km southwest of Qazan, republic's capital, by road.

== History ==
The village was established in the 17th century.

From 18th to the first half of the 19th centuries village's residents belonged to the social estate of state peasants.

By the beginning of the twentieth century, village had 2 mosques, post office, post station and 4 small shops.

Before the creation of the Tatar ASSR in 1920 was a part of Zöyä Uyezd of Qazan Governorate. Since 1920 was a part of Zöyä Canton; after the creation of districts in Tatar ASSR (Tatarstan) in Qaybıç (Ölcän in 1927) (1927–1963), Bua (1963–1964), Apas (1964–1991) and Qaybıç districts.
