= Qamıllı =

Qamıllı Камыллы
- derevnya
- Location within Tatarstan
- Coordinates: 55.3428°N 47.6736°E
- Country: Russia
- Region: Tatarstan
- District: Qaybıç District
- Time zone: UTC+3:00

Qamıllı (Tatar: Камыллы, romanized: Qamıllı) is a rural locality (a derevnya) in Qaybıç District, Tatarstan. The population was 59 as of 2010.

== Geography ==
Qamıllı is located 39 km (24 mi) northwest of Olı Qaybıç, district's administrative centre, and 146 km (91 mi) southwest of Qazan, republic's capital, by road.

== History ==
The village was established in 1927.

After the creation of districts in Tatar ASSR (Tatarstan) in Qaybıç (Ölcän in 1927) (1927–1944), Külle İl (1944–1956), Qaybıç (1956–1963), Bua (1963–1964), Apas (1964–1991) and Qaybıç districts.
