= Ursaq forestry's settlement =

Ursaq forestry's settlement Урсак урманчылыгы
- posyolok
- Location within Tatarstan
- Country: Russia
- Region: Tatarstan
- District: Qaybıç District
- Time zone: UTC+3:00

Ursaq forestry's settlement (Tatar: Урсак урманчылыгы, romanized: Ursaq urmançılığı) is a rural locality (a posyolok) in Qaybıç District, Tatarstan. The population was 55 as of 2010.

== Geography ==
Ursaq forestry's settlement is located 12 km northeast of Olı Qaybıç, district's administrative centre, and 110 km southwest of Qazan, republic's capital, by road.

== History ==
The village was established in 1938.

Until 1963 was a part of Qaybıç District: After 1963 in Bua (1963–1964), Apas (1964–1991) and Qaybıç districts.
