= Qolañğı =

Qolañğı Колаңгы
- posyolok
- Location within Tatarstan
- Country: Russia
- Region: Tatarstan
- District: Qaybıç District
- Time zone: UTC+3:00

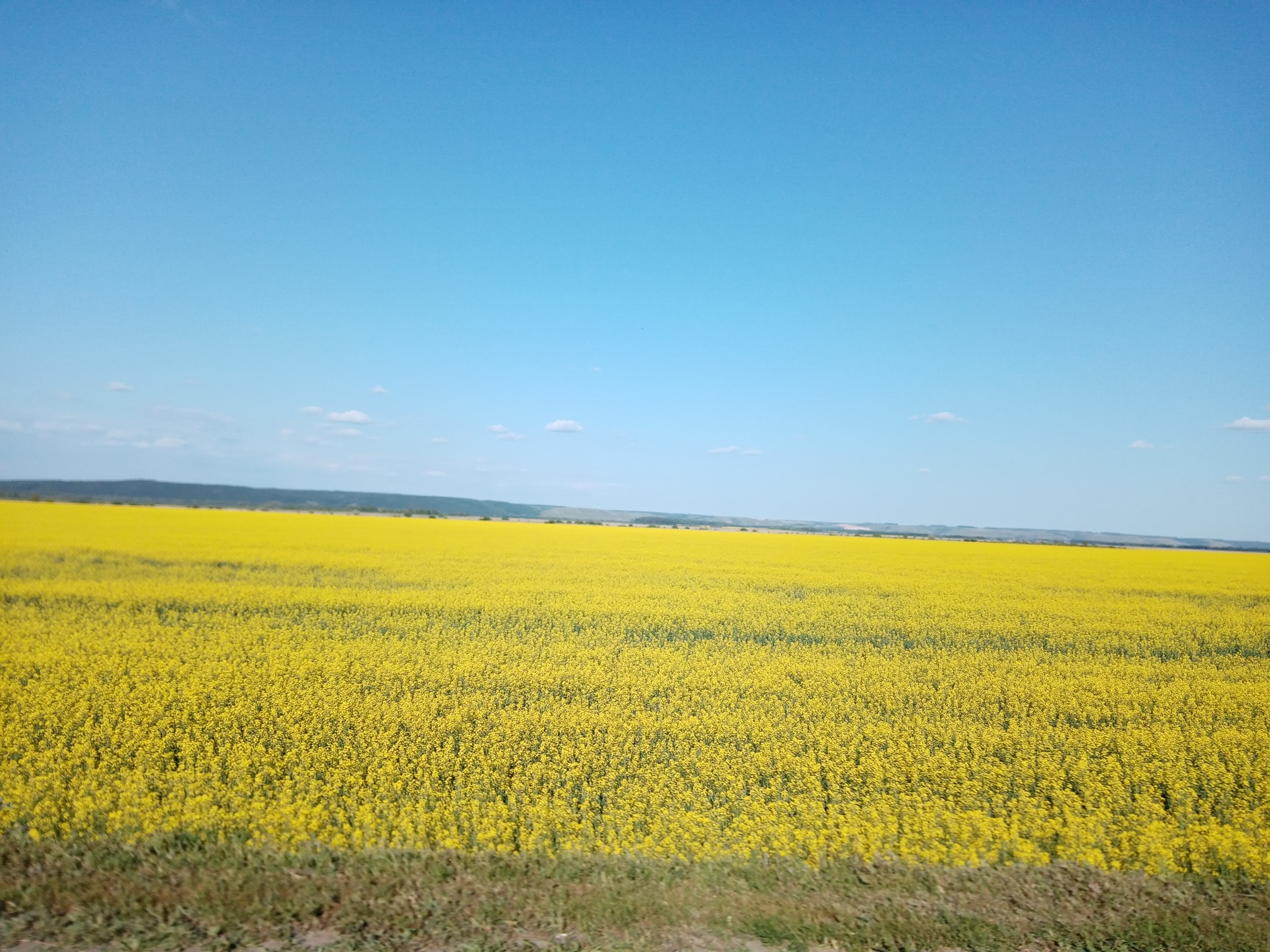

Qolañğı (Tatar: Колаңгы, romanized: Qolañğı) is a rural locality (a posyolok) in Qaybıç District, Tatarstan. The population was 339 as of 2010.

== Geography ==
Qolañğı is located 17 km northeast of Olı Qaybıç, district's administrative centre, and 91 km southwest of Qazan, republic's capital, by road.

== History ==
The village was established in 1943. Until 1963 was a part of Qaybıç District. After 1963 in Bua (1963–1964), Apas (1964–1991) and Qaybıç districts.
