= Starye Chechkaby =

Starye Chechkaby Старые Чечкабы

Other transcription(s)
  - Tatar: Иске Чәчкаб
- Interactive map of Starye Chechkaby
- Location of Starye Chechkaby Starye Chechkaby (Tatarstan)
- Coordinates: 55°24′27″N 48°06′52″E
- Country: Russia
- Federal subject: Tatarstan
- Founded: 13th–14th century
- Elevation: 140 m (460 ft)

Population
  - Estimate (2002): 482 )
- Time zone: UTC+3 (MSK)
- Postal code: 422330
- Dialing code: +7 8437030
- OKTMO ID: 92629408111

Starye Chechkaby (Russian: Старые Чечкабы; Tatar: Иске Чәчкаб, İske Çäçqab: "Old Chechkab" or Урман Чәчкабы, Urman Çäçqabı) is a village in the Kaybitsky District of the Republic of Tatarstan. The village is located 100 kilometres (62 mi) south-west of Kazan and 5 kilometres (3.1 mi) west of Greater Kaybits. The Kulanga railway station is located 25 kilometres (16 mi) from the village. It is near the river Berlya, which flows into Sviyaga.

== Climate ==
The climate is moderately continental, with a Köppen climate classification of Dfb (humid continental climate). The average annual temperature is 4.3 °C (39.7 °F).

== History ==
The village dates back to ancient times. The first records date from the years 1565–1567. The village has been known since the time of the Khanate of Kazan. This can be seen in archival documents and local history materials collected by K. Galimov and Kalimullin.

According to legend, at the time of the capture of Kazan two Beks (aristocrats) named Chechka-bek and Kulay-bek lived in the village. Kulay-bek helped besiege the city during the capture of Kazan. The king gave him land to the south of the village, where the Buinsky District (New Chechkaby) is now located. Chechka-bek helped the defenders, and perished in the defense of Kazan. Because of this, his village was destroyed, and the remaining villagers founded a new village, which was named in his honor (Chechkaby).

Through the territory of the village is a bypass of Kazan, which was built during the Great Patriotic War. During that war, 165 people left the village, and of these, 111 were lost in battles for the Motherland.

== Population ==
Mostly Tatars live in the village. Mordvinians (Agish side) and Chuvashes also lived in the village, but later gradually moved out or became Tatars under the influence of Islam.

Demographics
Year	Population
1646	5 (only the male population was counted)
1721	59 (only the male population was counted)
1744	62 (only the male population was counted)
1762	74 (only the male population was counted)
1795	325
1834	309
1858	463
1900	999
1920	1009
1923	519
1926	726
1928	819
1941	984
1957	901
2000	486
2010	450

I.A. Iznoskov in his "Materials of the Inhabitants of the Villages and the County Sviazhsky 1880 – 90 years" wrote that 557 people lived in the village of Old Chechkabs (268 men and 289 women). In 1877, 206 men and 198 women lived in 87 houses. The population later decreased as people fled south in search of land.

== Mosque ==
The mosque and mahallah were founded 1790. This mosque was in a ravine, because it was not permitted to build mosques in the uplands. It was reconstructed in 1871 using donations from village inhabitants. In 1937 the tower of the mosque was demolished by the Bolsheviks and the building was turned into a house of culture. A new mosque, which is still extant, was built in 1833, but is no longer in use. The current mosque opened on July 16, 1995, at the new location.

=== Mullahs ===
- Damela Mohammed
- Abdellatif Alka son of Abdelsha Bikchur
- Zalyaletdin Nazir
- Ahmadzakir Mella Zalyaletdin
- Sitdikov Gabdeshakur
- Yarhamutdin Saifutdinov, son of Zalyaletdin
- Zinnatulla Zagidullin
- Firdus Shagiev

=== Muazzins ===
- Abdelzhabbar Ait
- Kamarutdin Abdelgaffar
- Sitdikov Gabidulla
- Yarhamutdin Sayfetdin
- Nurutdin Khairutdinov
- Davlyatsha Gallyamov

== Gallery ==
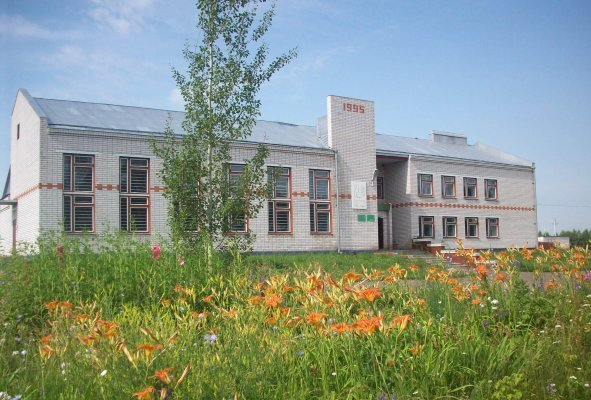
Chechkabs High School (summer)

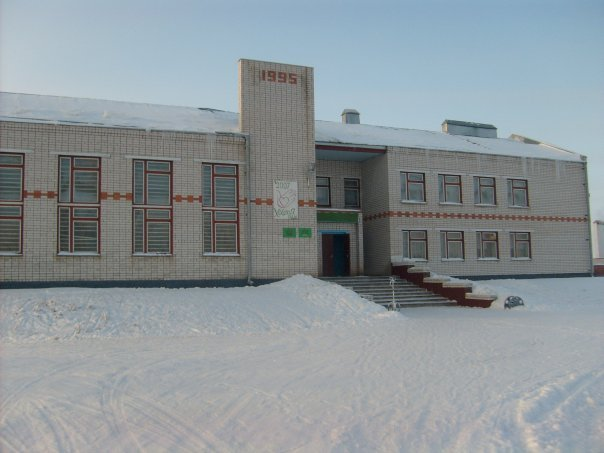
Chechkabs High School (winter)

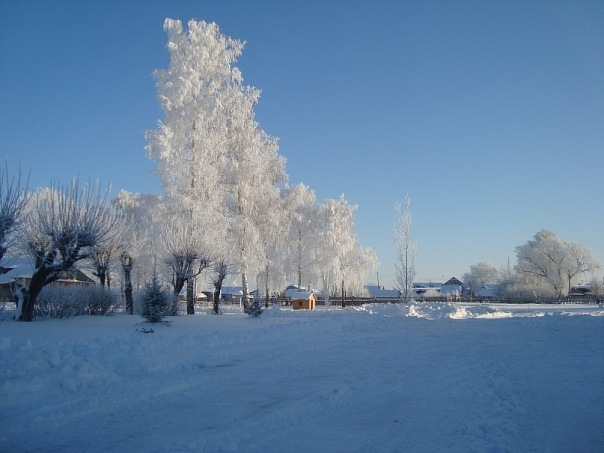
Schoolyard

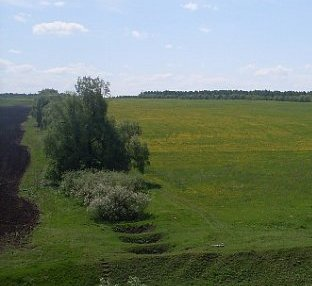
The Kazan bypass

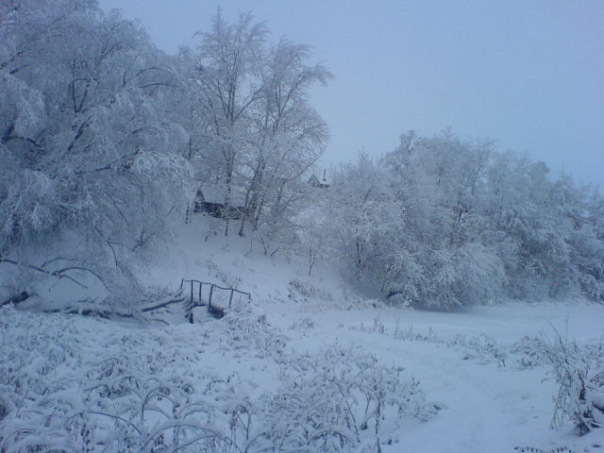
The winter landscape

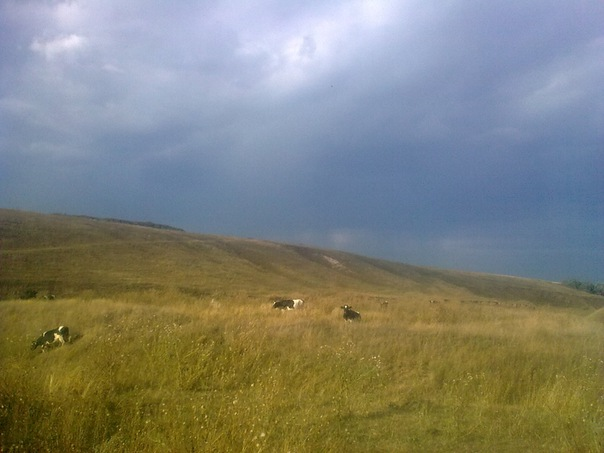
Ulan

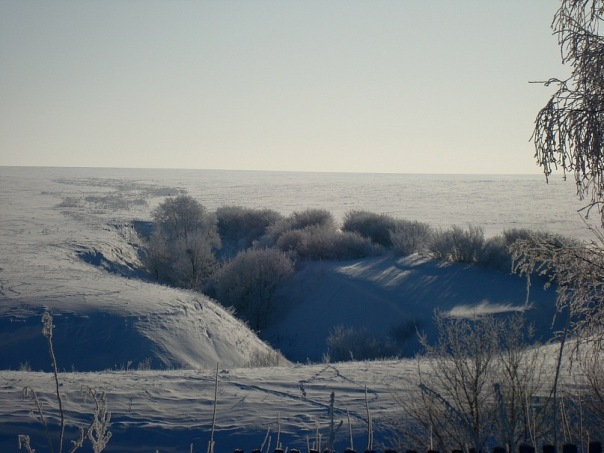
The loss of Qarama

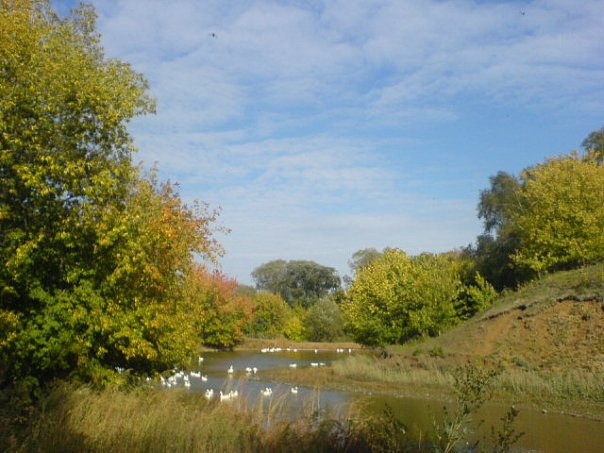
"Buwa" Pond

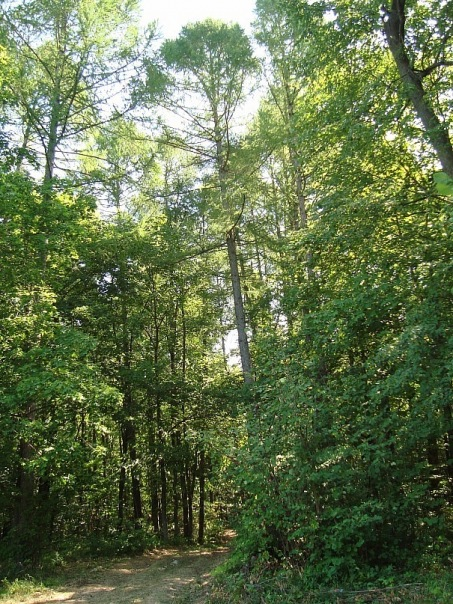
The forest of Zirekle

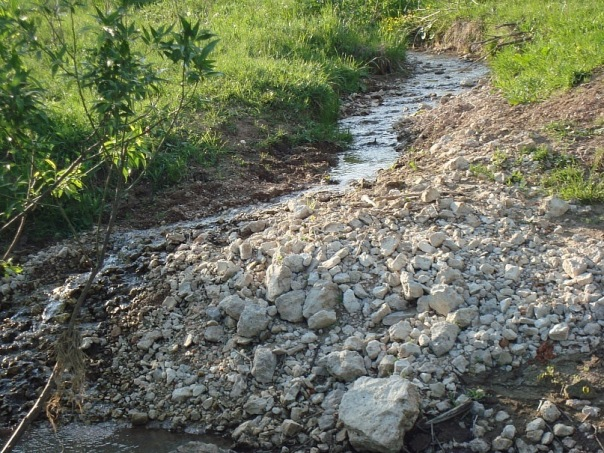
The spring of Frol

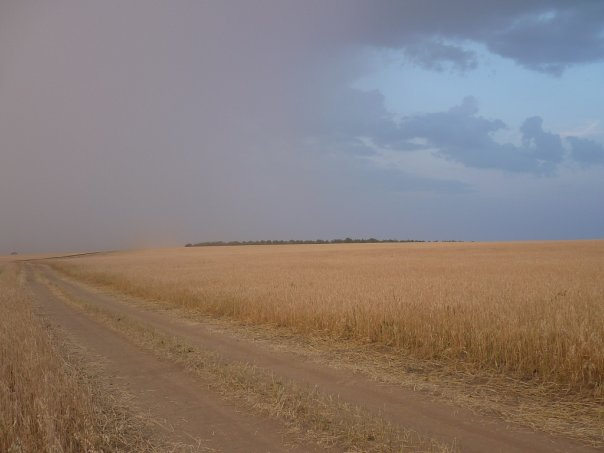
The field

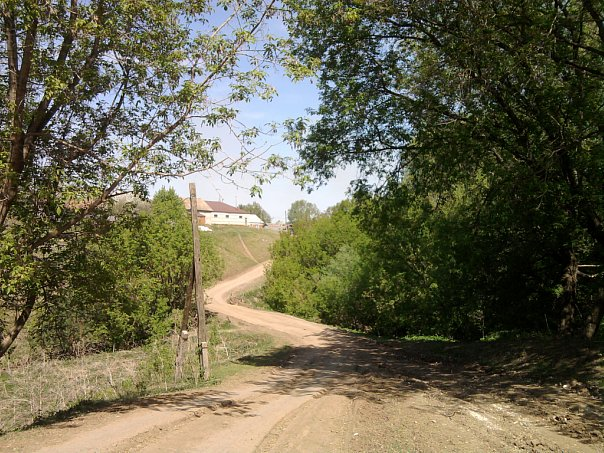
The Old Bridge

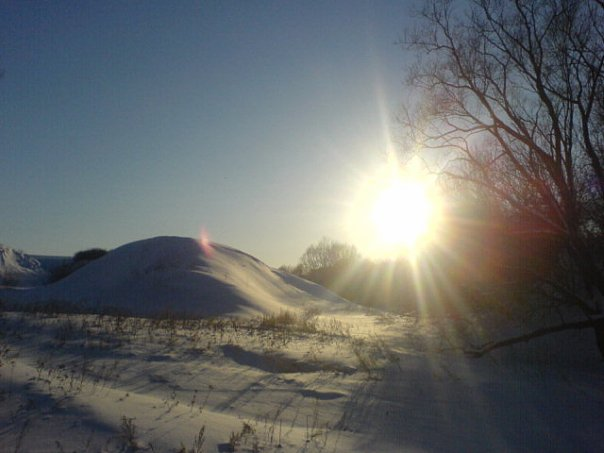
The mountain of Tugarak

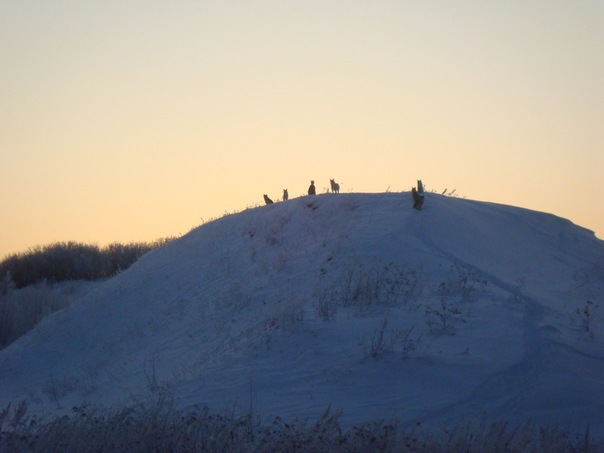
The mountain of Qarama
