= Tetyushsky =

Tetyushsky (masculine), Tetyushskaya (feminine), or Tetyushksoye (neuter) may refer to:

- Tetyushsky District, a district of the Republic of Tatarstan, Russia
- Tetyushskoye, a rural locality (a selo) in Ulyanovsk Oblast, Russia
