= Chuvashia (disambiguation) =

Chuvashia may refer to:

- Chuvash Republic, a federal subject of Russia
- Chuvash Autonomous Oblast (1920–1925), an administrative division of the Russian SFSR
- Chuvash Autonomous Soviet Socialist Republic (1925–1992), an administrative division of the Russian SSR
