= Murali, Kaybitsky District, Republic of Tatarstan =

Rural locality in Tatarstan, Russia

Coordinates: 55°25′48″N 48°19′56″E

Murali (Russian: Мурали; Tatar: Мөрәле, romanized: Möräle [mœræˈle]) is a rural locality (a selo) in Kaybitsky District of the Republic of Tatarstan, Russia, located on the Birlya River, 11 kilometers (6.8 mi) east of Bolshiye Kaybitsy, the administrative center of the district. Population: 496 (2010 est.); 583 (1997 est.); 611 (1989); all ethnic Tatars. There is a secondary school and a mosque in Murali. The main occupation of the population is agriculture and cattle breeding. Murali has been known to exist since the times of the Khanate of Kazan.
