= Buinsk =

Buinsk (Russian: Буинск) is the name of several inhabited localities in Russia.

Urban localities

- Buinsk, Republic of Tatarstan, a town of republic significance in the Republic of Tatarstan
- Buinsk, Ibresinsky District, Chuvash Republic, an urban-type settlement in Buinskoye Rural Settlement of Ibresinsky District of the Chuvash Republic

Rural localities

- Buinsk, Urmarsky District, Chuvash Republic, a village in Kovalinskoye Rural Settlement of Urmarsky District of the Chuvash Republic
