= Shaukat Galiev =

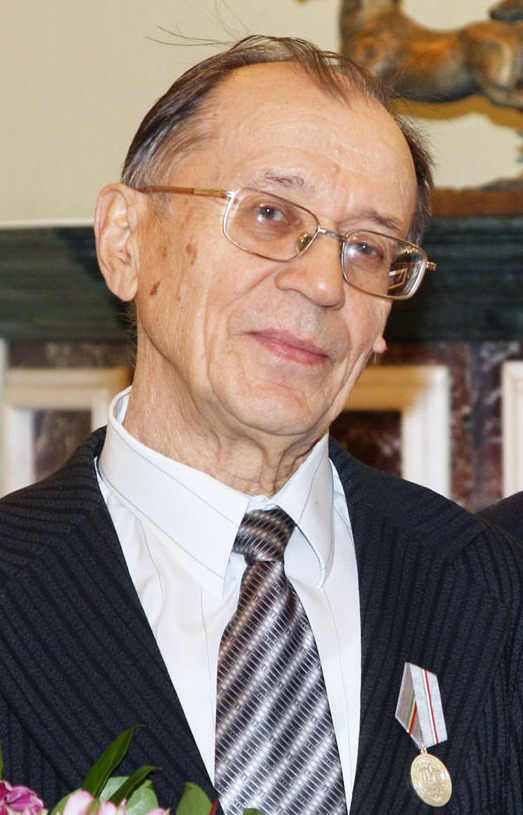
- Born: Shaukat Galievich Idiyatullin; 20 November 1928; Kazan Governorate, USSR
- Died: 7 May 2011 (aged 82); Kazan, Russia
- Occupations: Editor, publicist, writer
- Spouse: Farida Idiyatullina
- Writing career
- Genres: Poetry, children's literature

Shaukat Galiev (full name Shaukat Galievich Idiyatullin, Tatar: Шәүкәт Галиулла улы Һидиятуллин; Russian: Шаукат Галиевич Идиятуллин, 20 November 1928 – 7 May 2011) was a renowned Tatar poet, writer, and a publisher, widely known for his children's books.
