= Ulyankovo =

Ulyankovo Ульянково
- Village
- Location within Vologda Oblast Location within Russia
- Coordinates: 60°31′N 41°46′E
- Country: Russia
- Region: Vologda Oblast
- District: Verkhovazhsky District
- Time zone: UTC+3:00

Ulyankovo (Russian: Ульянково) is a rural locality (a village) in Chushevitskoye Rural Settlement, Verkhovazhsky District, Vologda Oblast, Russia. The population was 24 as of 2002.

== Geography ==
Ulyankovo is located 47 km southwest of Verkhovazhye (the district's administrative centre) by road. Bereg is the nearest rural locality.
