= Apastovo =

Apastovo Апастово
- Urban-type settlement

Other transcription(s)
  - Tatar: Апас
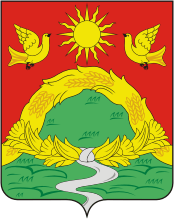
- Coat of arms
- Interactive map of Apastovo
- Location of Apastovo Apastovo (Tatarstan)
- Coordinates: 55°12′N 48°30′E
- Country: Russia
- Federal subject: Tatarstan
- Administrative district: Apastovsky District
- 17th century
- Urban-type settlement status since: September 9, 2004
- Elevation: 90 m (300 ft)

Population (2010 Census)
  - Total: 5,145
  - Estimate (2021): 5,119 (−0.5%)

Administrative status
  - Capital of: Apastovsky District

Municipal status
  - Municipal district: Apastovsky Municipal District
  - Urban settlement: Apastovo Urban Settlement
  - Capital of: Apastovsky Municipal District, Apastovo Urban Settlement
- Time zone: UTC+3 (MSK)
- Postal codes: 422350, 422369
- Dialing code: +7 84376
- OKTMO ID: 92610151051

Apastovo population
- 2010 Census: 5,145
- 2002 Census: 4,566
- 1989 Census: 3,903

Apastovo (Russian: Апа́стово; Tatar: Апас) is an urban locality (an urban-type settlement) and the administrative center of Apastovsky District of the Republic of Tatarstan, Russia, located 109 kilometers (68 mi) from the republic's capital of Kazan. As of the 2010 Census, its population was 5,145.

In 1992, the majority of the population was Tatar.

== Geography ==
Apastovo lies on the Kazan–Ulyanovsk auto route, 109 kilometers (68 mi) south of the republic's capital of Kazan, in the Sviyaga River valley, 5 kilometers (3.1 mi) from the main channel, on a small stream named Tabarka, which is a tributary of the Ulema River.

== History ==
It has been known since the 17th century as Yenaleyevo (Еналеево). Apastovo served as the administrative center of Apastovsky District in 1930–1963, and again since March 4, 1964. Urban-type settlement status was granted to it on September 9, 2004.

== Administrative and municipal status ==
Within the framework of administrative divisions, the urban-type settlement of Apastovo serves as the administrative center of Apastovsky District, of which it is a part. As a municipal division, Apastovo, together with one rural locality (the village of Starye Yenali), is incorporated within Apastovsky Municipal District as Apastovo Urban Settlement.

== Economy ==
The industrial facilities in Apastovo include a bakery and a brick factory. Agricultural activities are focused on the dairy cattle breeding. The nearest railway station is Karatun, located 11 kilometers (6.8 mi) from Apastovo.

== Culture ==
Apastovo is home to the Apastovsky Museum, which was established on December 31, 1991 and opened to public on November 1, 1993. The museum contains archaeological and paleontological finds in the area, including ancient tools, bone needles, stone hammers, a skull of a rhinoceros, mammoth teeth, and more. It also exhibits a collection of documents and photographs from the 19th and 20th century and provides an insight into the ethnography and everyday living of the Kazan Tatars.
