= Tetyushsky Uyezd =

Kazan Governate subdivision of the Russian Empire

Tetyushsky Uyezd (Тетю́шский уе́зд) was one of the subdivisions of the Kazan Governorate of the Russian Empire. It was situated in the southern part of the governorate. Its administrative centre was Tetyushi.

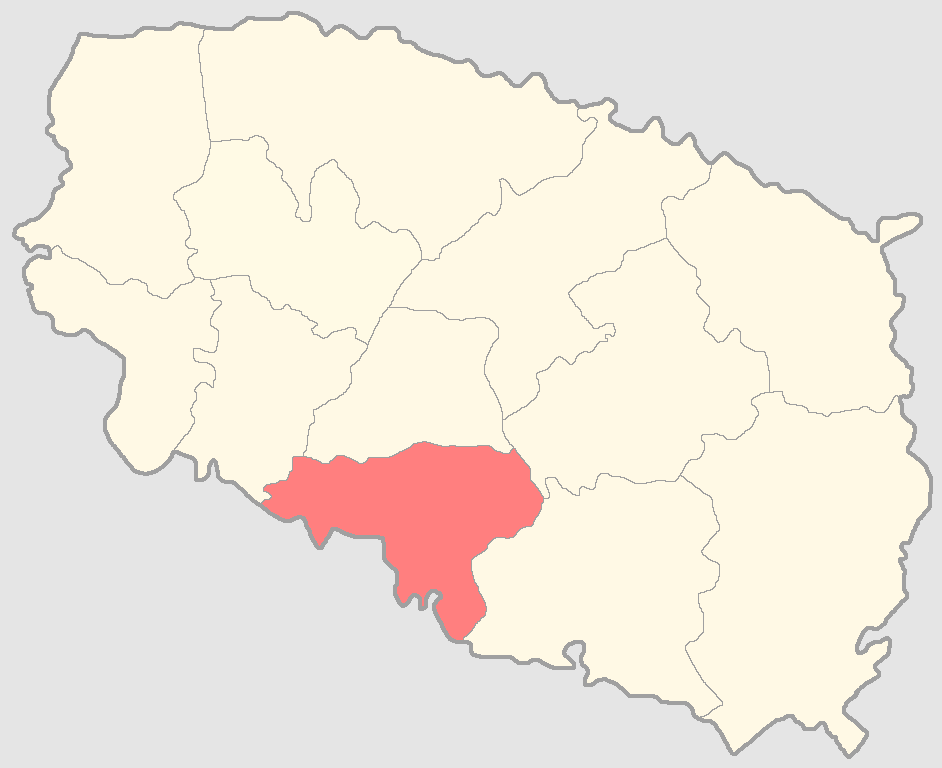
Location of the Tetushky subdivision

== Demographics ==
At the time of the Russian Empire Census of 1897, Tetyushsky Uyezd had a population of 185,865. Of these, 49.1% spoke Tatar, 31.6% Russian, 16.6% Chuvash and 2.7% Mordvin as their native language.
