= Buinsk, Republic of Tatarstan =

Town in the Republic of Tatarstan, Russia

Buinsk Буинск Пӑва (Chuvash)
- Town

Other transcription(s)
  - Tatar: Буа
  - Chuvash: Пӑва
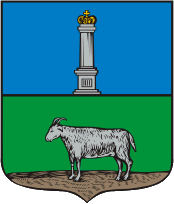
- Coat of arms
- Interactive map of Buinsk
- Location of Buinsk Buinsk (Tatarstan)
- Coordinates: 54°58′N 48°17′E
- Country: Russia
- Federal subject: Tatarstan
- First mentioned: 1691
- Town status since: 1780
- Elevation: 80 m (260 ft)

Population (2010 Census)
  - Total: 20,352
  - Estimate (2021): 19,968 (−1.9%)

Administrative status
  - Subordinated to: town of republic significance of Buinsk
  - Capital of: town of republic significance of Buinsk, Buinsky District

Municipal status
  - Municipal district: Buinsky Municipal District
  - Urban settlement: Buinsk Urban Settlement
  - Capital of: Buinsky Municipal District, Buinsk Urban Settlement
- Time zone: UTC+3 (MSK)
- Postal code: 422430–422435
- OKTMO ID: 92618101001

Buinsk (Russian: Буи́нск; Tatar: Буа; Chuvash: Пӑва, Păva) is a town in the Republic of Tatarstan, Russia, located on the left bank of the Karla River (left tributary of the Sviyaga), 137 kilometers (85 mi) southwest of Kazan. Population: 20,352 (2010 census); 19,736 (2002 census); 16,800 (1989 Soviet census).

== History ==
It was first mentioned in a chronicle in 1691. Town status was granted to it in 1780.

== Administrative and municipal status ==
Within the framework of administrative divisions, Buinsk serves as the administrative center of Buinsky District, even though it is not a part of it. As an administrative division, it is incorporated separately as the town of republic significance of Buinsk—an administrative unit with the status equal to that of the districts. As a municipal division, the town of republic significance of Buinsk is incorporated within Buinsky Municipal District as Buinsk Urban Settlement.
