= Tetyushi, Republic of Tatarstan =

Town in the Republic of Tatarstan, Russia

Tetyushi Тетюши
- Town

Other transcription(s)
  - Tatar: Тәтеш
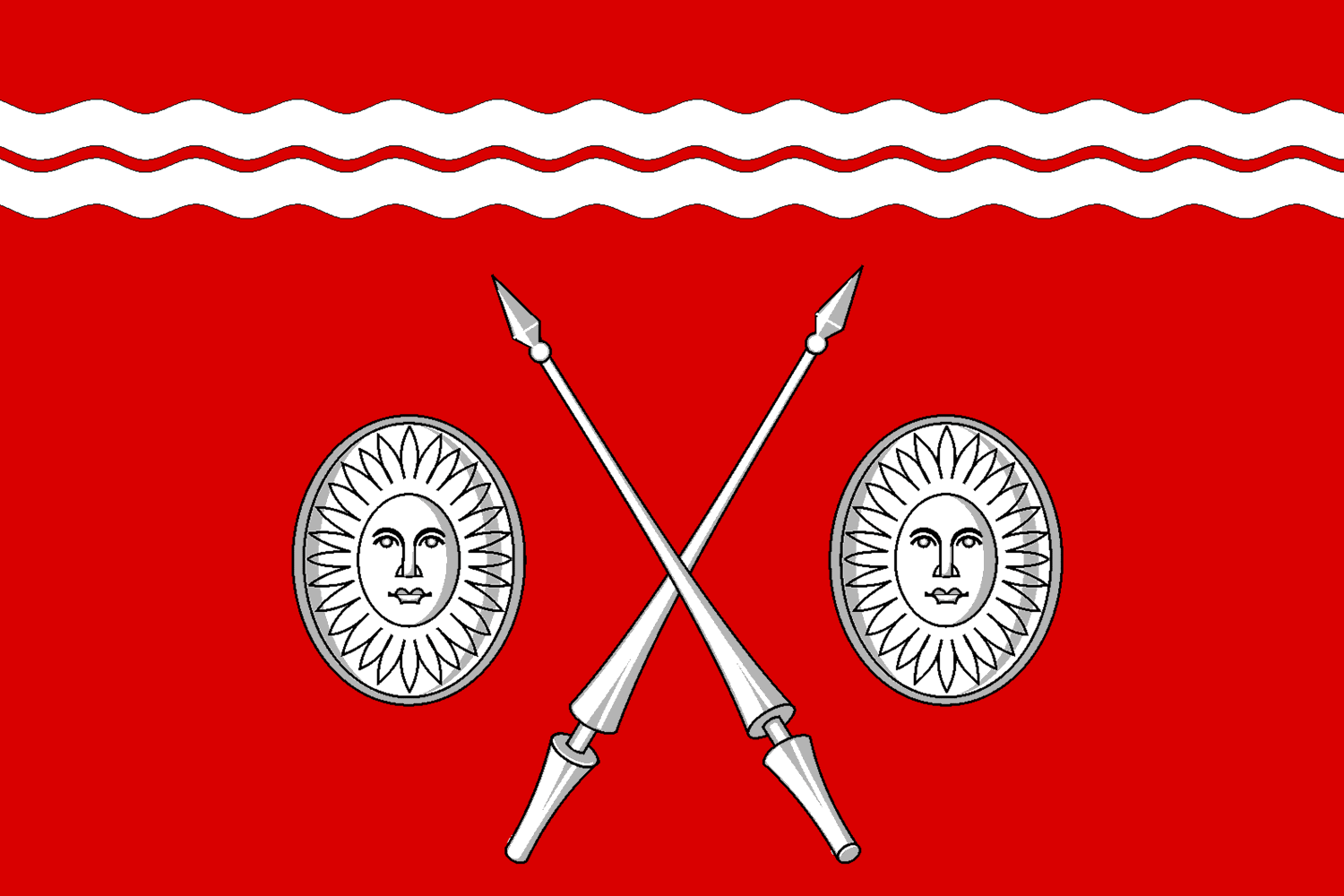
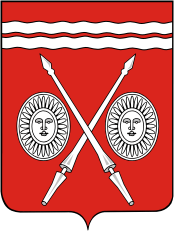
- Flag Coat of arms
- Interactive map of Tetyushi
- Location of Tetyushi Tetyushi (Tatarstan)
- Coordinates: 54°56′N 48°50′E
- Country: Russia
- Federal subject: Tatarstan
- Administrative district: Tetyushsky District
- Founded: 1574–1578 or 1555–1557
- Town status since: 1781

Area
  - Total: 7.3 km^{2} (2.8 sq mi)
- Elevation: 160 m (520 ft)

Population (2010 Census)
  - Total: 11,596
  - Estimate (2021): 10,535 (−9.1%)
  - Density: 1,600/km^{2} (4,100/sq mi)

Administrative status
  - Capital of: Tetyushsky District

Municipal status
  - Municipal district: Tetyushsky Municipal District
  - Urban settlement: Tetyushi Urban Settlement
  - Capital of: Tetyushsky Municipal District, Tetyushi Urban Settlement
- Time zone: UTC+3 (MSK)
- Postal codes: 422370, 422399
- OKTMO ID: 92655101001

Tetyushi (Russian: Тетю́ши; Tatar: Тәтеш) is a town and the administrative center of Tetyushsky District in the Republic of Tatarstan, Russia, located on the right bank of the Volga River, on the shore of the Kuybyshev Reservoir, 180 kilometers (110 mi) south of Kazan, the capital of the republic. As of the 2010 Census, its population was 11,596. It was previously known as Tetyushskaya zastava.

== History ==
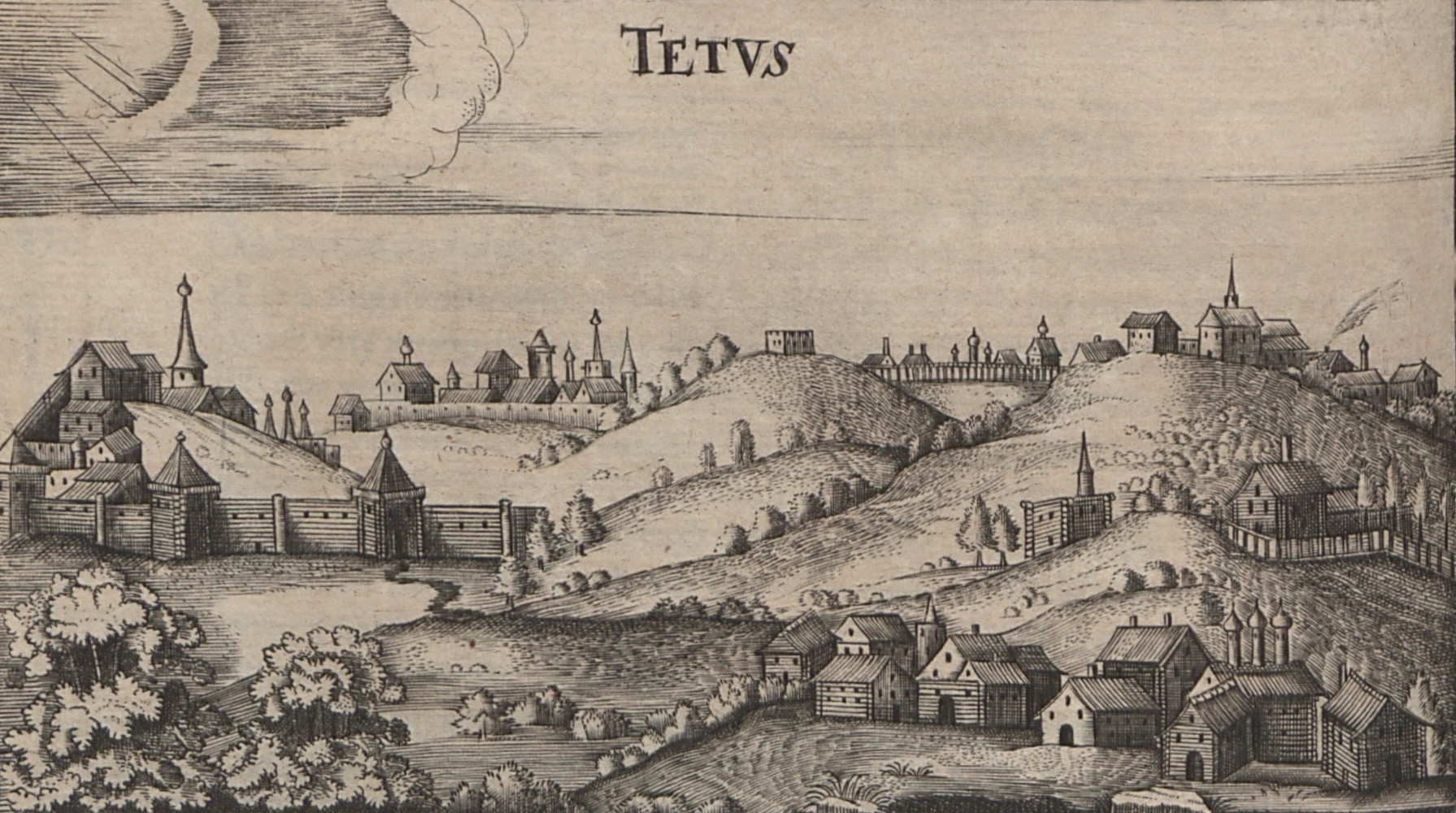
Tetyushi, by Adam Olearius

It was founded in 1574–1578 or in 1555–1557 as Tetyushskaya zastava (Тетюшская застава). It was granted town status in 1781. In 1920–1927, it served as the administrative center of a kanton. It served as the administrative center of a district since 1930.

The town was the site of a major battle during Stepan Razin's rebellion.

== Geology ==
The base of Severodvinian stage of the Tatarian series of the Permian period (subdivisions valid only in Russian stratigraphic chart) is defined in the Monastyrskii ravine, near Tetyushi.

== Administrative and municipal status ==
Within the framework of administrative divisions, Tetyushi serves as the administrative center of Tetyushsky District, to which it is directly subordinated. As a municipal division, the town of Tetyushi, together with two rural localities, is incorporated within Tetyushsky Municipal District as Tetyushi Urban Settlement.

== Economy ==
As of 1997, the town's industrial enterprises included a meat factory, a dairy, a bakery, a brewery, a fish processing, plant, a furniture plant, an animal feedstuff factory, and a branch of the Kazan Helicopters company. The nearest railway station is Bua on the Ulyanovsk–Sviyazhsk line, 45 kilometers (28 mi) west of Tetyushi.

== Demographics ==
Tetyushi population
- 2010 Census: 11,596
- 2002 Census: 11,931
- 1989 Census: 10,487
- 1979 Census: 10,199

As of 1989, the population was ethnically mostly Russian (61.9%), Tatar (20.6%), Chuvash (11.6%), and Mordvin (5.1%).

== Notable people ==
- Ilyas Phaizulline, classical realist painter
