= Tetyushsky District =

Tetyushsky District Тетюшский район (Russian)
- District

Other transcription(s)
  - Tatar: Тәтеш районы
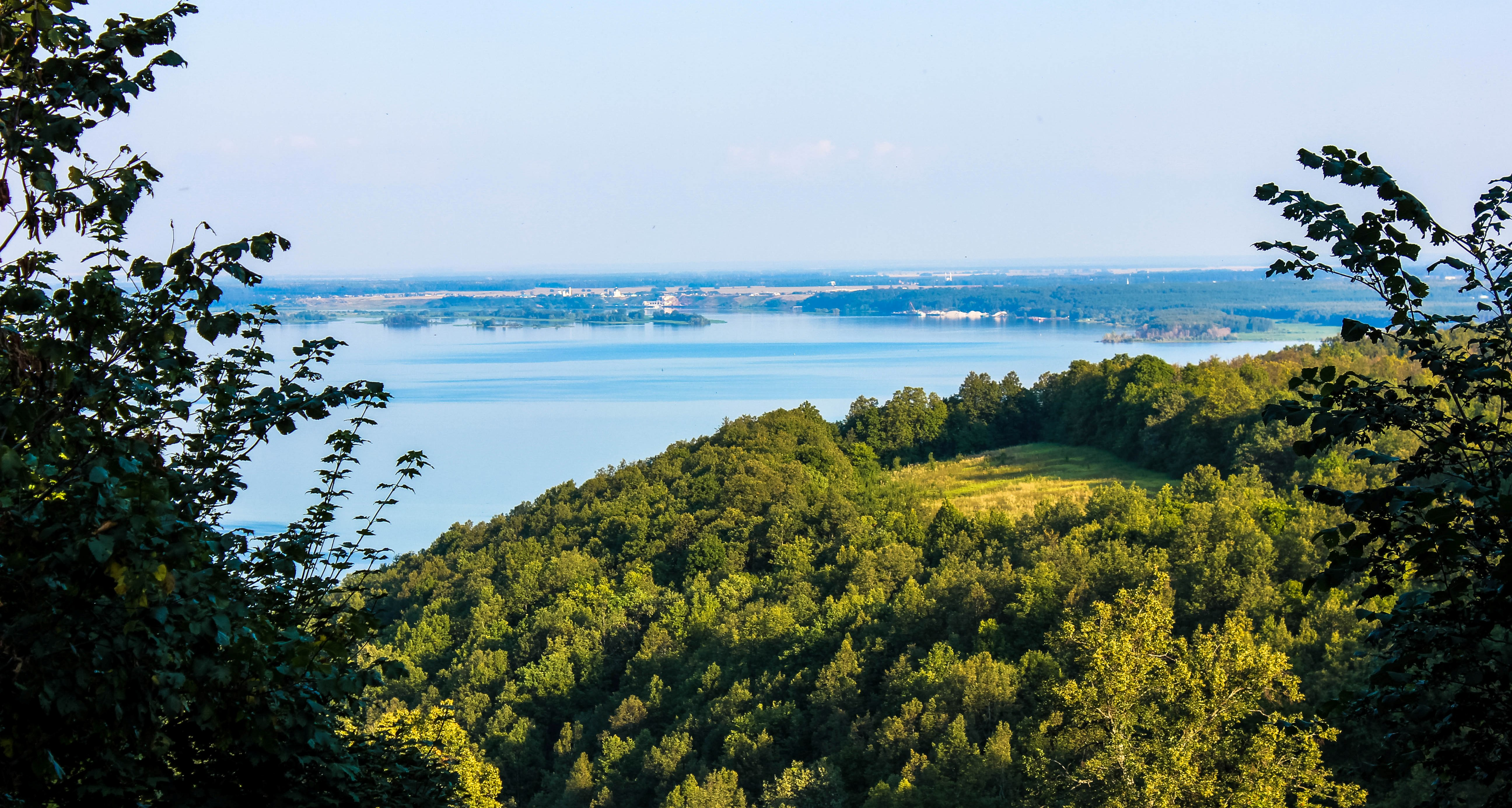
- Tetyushskyy reserve, Tetyushsky District

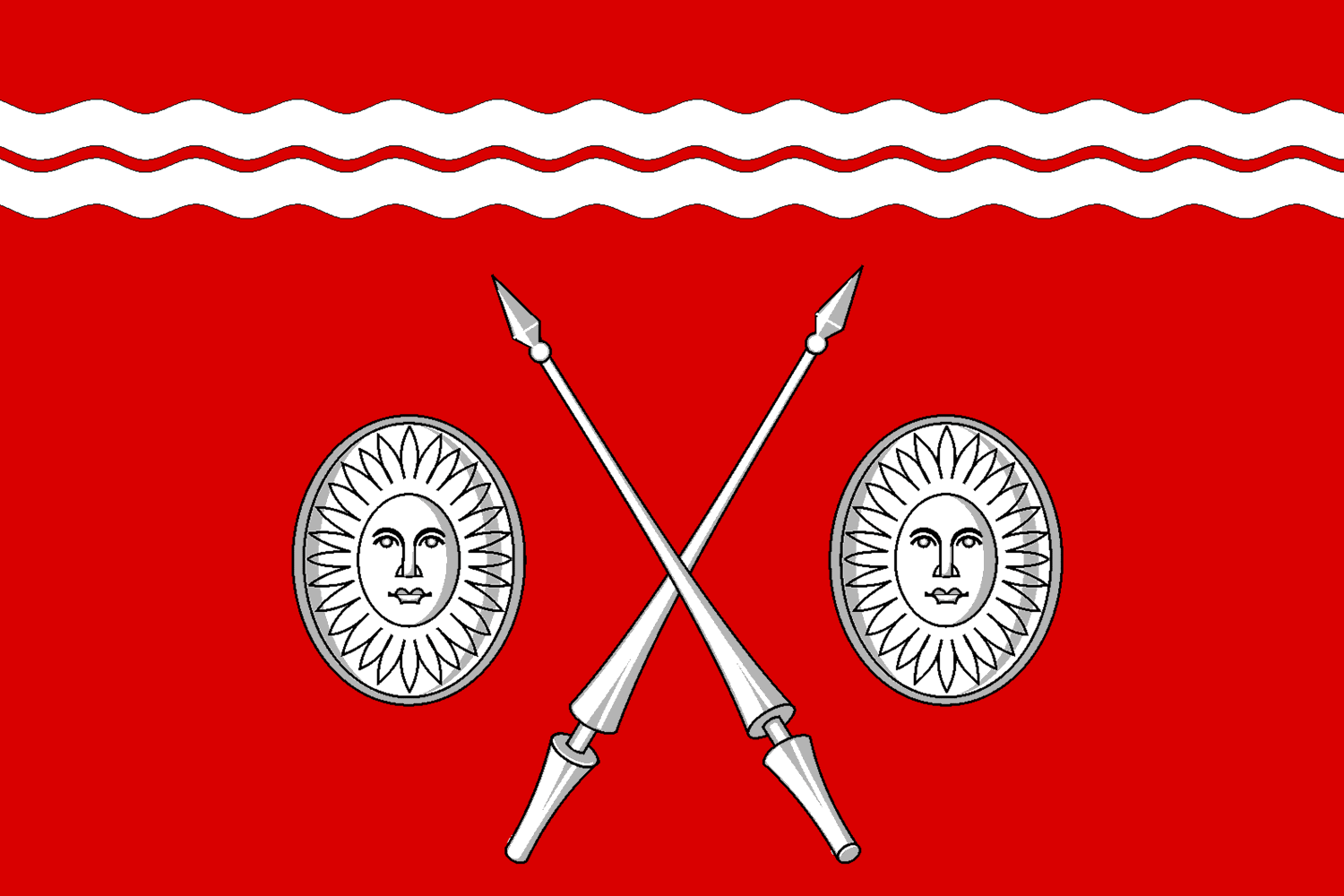
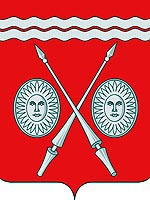
- Flag Coat of arms
- Location of Tetyushsky District in the Republic of Tatarstan
- Coordinates: 54°55′N 48°44′E
- Country: Russia
- Federal subject: Republic of Tatarstan
- Established: 1930
- Administrative center: Tetyushi

Area
  - Total: 1,632 km^{2} (630 sq mi)

Population (2010 Census)
  - Total: 24,875
  - Density: 15.24/km^{2} (39.48/sq mi)
  - Urban: 46.6%
  - Rural: 53.4%

Administrative structure
  - Inhabited localities: 1 cities/towns, 74 rural localities

Municipal structure
  - Municipally incorporated as: Tetyushsky Municipal District
  - Municipal divisions: 1 urban settlements, 20 rural settlements
- Time zone: UTC+3 (MSK)
- OKTMO ID: 92655000
- Website: http://tetushi.tatarstan.ru/

Tetyushsky District (Russian: Тетю́шский райо́н; Tatar: Тәтеш районы) is a territorial administrative unit and municipal district of the Republic of Tatarstan within the Russian Federation. The district is located in the south-west of Tatarstan, on the right bank of the Kuybyshev Reservoir, and shares borders with the Ulyanovsk Oblast, Buinsky, Apastovsky and Kamsko-Ustyinsky District. The administrative center of the district is the city of Tetyushi.

Settlements first began to appear in the region around V-VI BC. The city of Tetyushi was officially founded in 1578 when Kazan's Russian governors decided to construct a fortification on the right bank of the Volga to protect the region following the siege of Kazan and the fall of the Kazan Khanate. In 1781 Tetyushi was granted the status of a uezd. The contemporary Tetyushsky district was formed in 1930.

The focus of regional development is tourism and agriculture. Additionally, there is a historical and architectural natural park "Dolgaya Polyana" with a former estate of the Count Molostvov – one of the few rural noble estates preserved in its original form on the territory of the former province of Kazan.

== Geography ==
The Tetyushsky district is located in the southwestern part of Tatarstan, on the right bank of the Kuybyshev Reservoir which is commonly known as the Volga Upland. In the south, the district borders on the Ulyanovsk Oblast, Buinsky, Apastovsky and Kamsko-Ustyinsky District. The administrative center is the city of Tetyushi. As of 2020 the district population was 21,584.

== Coat of arms ==
The regional coat of arms is patterned on the coat of arms of the Kazan Viceroyalty which was approved on October 18, 1871. In the center of the coat of arms are silver stripes that symbolize the geographical position of the region (on the right bank of the Volga river). The red color of the coat of arms reflects courage, strength, labor, beauty, while silver represents purity, perfection, peace, mutual understanding. The flag has the same depiction as the coat of arms.

== History ==
The first settlements in the region appeared in V-VI BC. These settlements were discovered in the 1920s, during archeological excavations on the outskirts of the city. Scholars suggest that the Burtases were the first who settled in the region, while later came Bulgars and Tatars. There was also a large grave field found in the region which corresponds with the Volga Bulgarian period.

The official founding date of the city Tetyushi is 1578. The city was founded after the siege of Kazan in 1552 after a fortification was formed on the right bank of the river with the aim of protecting the region. In 1781 Tetyushi was granted with a status of uyezd. In this period frequent trade fairs took place in the city due to its advantageous positioning at the intersection of several trade routes on the Volga river. Starting from the middle of the 19th century and up to the 20th century, Tetyushi's population consisted mainly of representatives of the bourgeoisie, merchants and peasants; while the privileged social class was almost invisible. During that period, even though Tetyushi had the administrative status of a city, the everyday lifestyle of its citizens instead resembled rural modes of life.

The contemporary Tetyushsky District was founded in 1930. Until 1920, the territory of the current district belonged to the Tetyushsky district, in 1920-1927 it was part of the Tetyushsky canton of the TASSR and from 1927 to 1930 the territory resided in the Buinsky canton. In 1959 the territory of the abolished Bolshetarkhan district of Tatarstan became part of the Tetyushsky district.

From 2012 to 2014, the head of the district was Valery Chershintsev who replaced the district previous head Mukharryam Ibyatov. Since 2014, the head of the district has been Ramis Safiullov, who previously headed the agricultural enterprise "Kolos", до него главой был Мухаррям Ибятов.

== Population ==
The territory of the district is a place of traditional residence for several nationalities. Russians constitute 35.7% of the population, followed closely by Tatars - 32.7%, Chuvash - 20.9% and Mordovians - 9.6% (the highest share of the Mordovian population in the republic).

In the Tetyushsky municipal district, there is 1 urban and 20 rural settlements with 75 settlements within them.

== Economy ==
=== Industry and Agriculture ===
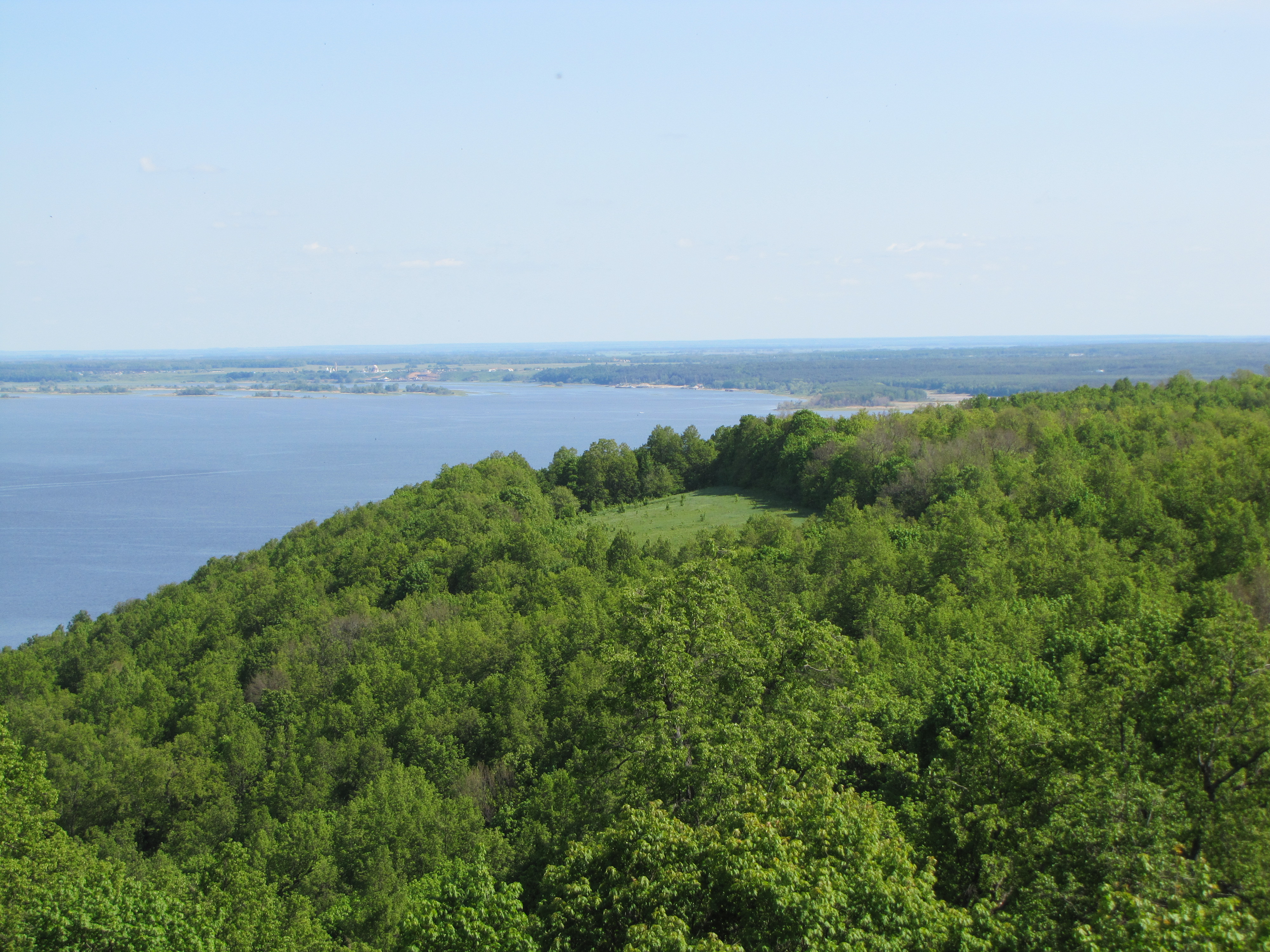
A view on the Kuybyshev Reservoir, 2011

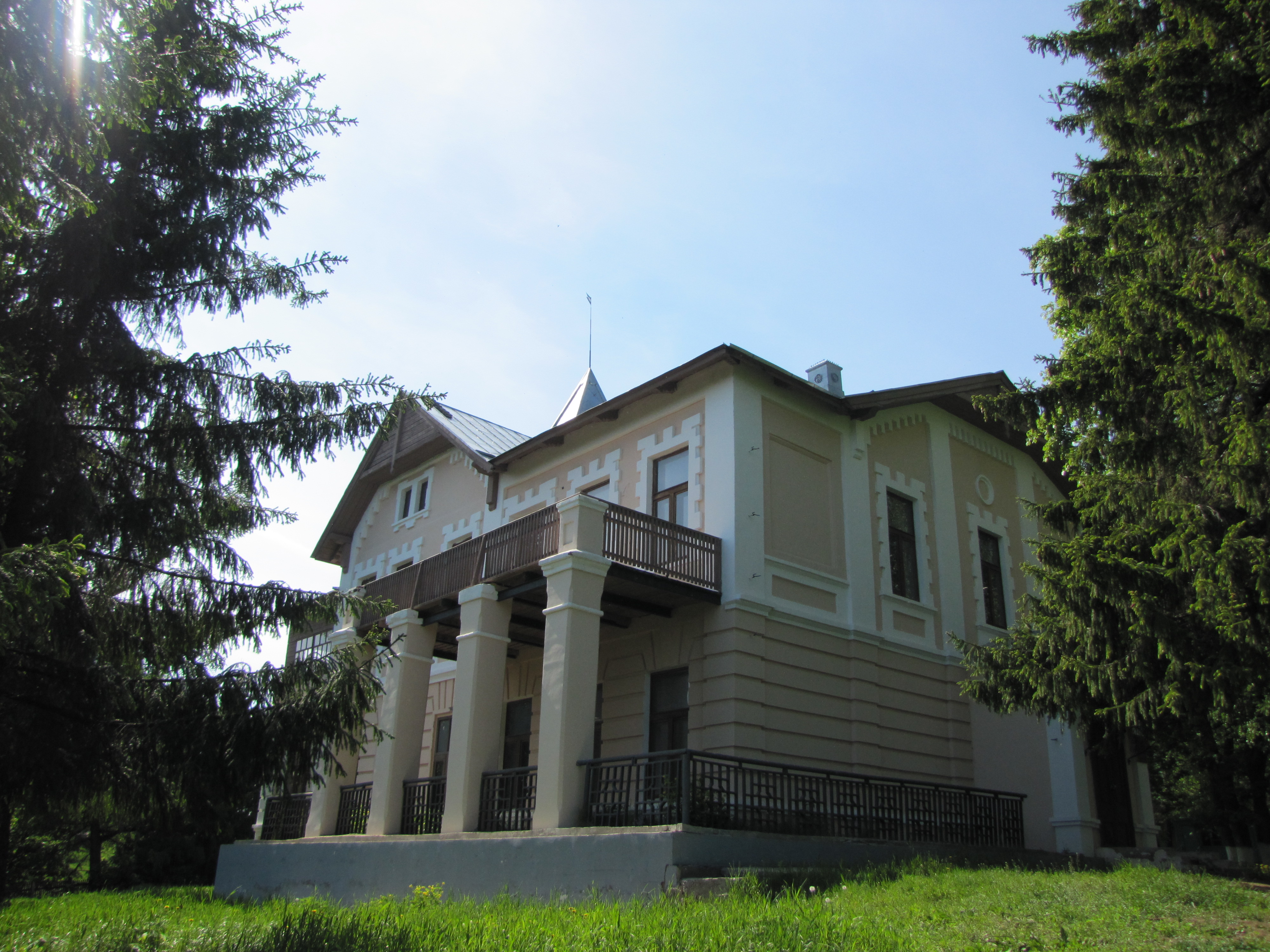
Дом-усадьба Молостовых в природном парке Долгая Поляна, 2011 год

For the first half of 2020, investment in fixed assets in the Tetyushsky district amounted to about 0.5 million rubles from budgetary funds, or 0.3% of the total contribution to the municipal budget. District investments in fixed assets excluding budgetary funds constituted only 93,197 rubles, or 4318 rubles per capita - one of the lowest rates among Tatarstan municipalities. Due to the lack of large industrial complexes in the region, the Tetyushsky District traditionally occupies one of the last places in the rankings of socio-economic development. Following the results of the first half of 2020, the district took 40th place out of 43 in the rating of socio-economic development. During the same period of time, the value of all locally produced goods sold was 0.4 million rubles, while the average indicator for Tatarstan municipalities is around 2 billion rubles. As for 2020, the only industrial complex in the district is a helicopter construction factory. At the same time, the district has an industrial park with 9 residents. Many industrial complexes that operated in the district during the Soviet times were forced to close down as a result of the financial crisis in the 1990s. As for 2020, the largest enterprises in the region are "Tetyushi-Vodokanal", "Tetyushskoe Enterprise of Heating Networks", "Tetyushsky District Consumer Society", "Tetyushskaya Printing House", "Tetyushskaya Garment Factory", "StroyInvest", "Gaztekhmontazh", "Tetyushskoe Lesnichestvo".

The main investment attraction strategy aims for the development of agriculture in the district which is the leading branch of the region's economy. The territory used as a farmland constitutes 96.7 thousand hectares on which more than 40 agricultural enterprises operate, the largest of which are "Stelz Agro-T", "Kolos" and "Nur". In the period from 2014 to 2018 these enterprises purchased 57 tractors, 32 combine harvesters, 10 forage harvesters, 3 beet harvesters, 2 beet loaders and 10 seeding complexes for a total of 850 million rubles.

=== Transport system ===
The highway Tetyushi - Undory - Syundyukovo and Tetyushi - Kamskoye Ustye crosses through the district. The Bua station is a large railway junction 35 km from Tetyushi which is linked to the city by road.

== Geology and Ecology ==
The region contains the Maksimovskoye deposit of light-burnt clays, the size of which is estimated at (15 million m³). The Vasilievsky quarry has industrial limestone reserves. Additionally, the district has proven oil reserves in its northern parts.

== Society and Culture ==
There are about 200 cultural heritage sites and about a hundred archaeological sites in the region, ranging from the Stone Age to the late Golden Horde period of the Khanate of Kazan. The largest settlement of the first millennium AD was discovered near the village of Bolshiye Tarkhany. Also the remains of large cities of Volga Bulgaria, such as Oshel and Khulash, have been found in the region. On the site of the village of Bolshiye Atryasi, there was another large city, the Thousand-domed Shungat. Since the 19th century, treasures containing such rare archaeological finds as 13.4 thousand Golden Horde coins, Bulgarian and Golden Horde items, a gold ring with the inscription "Sultan Mahmudan", gold discs of the Sultan and others have been repeatedly found in the region.

There is a historical, architectural and nature park "Dolgaya Polyana" in the district, which includes buildings of the estate of Count Molostvov - one of the few rural noble estates preserved in their original form on the territory of the former Kazan province. There is also the wild natural park "Pike Mountains" along Lake Labai in the Tetyushsky region. С 2014 года в регионе проводится мордовский фестиваль «Валда Шинясь».
