= Tsivilsky Uyezd =

Tsivilsky Uyezd (Циви́льский уе́зд) was one of the subdivisions of the Kazan Governorate of the Russian Empire. It was situated in the western part of the governorate. Its administrative centre was Tsivilsk.

== Demographics ==
At the time of the Russian Empire Census of 1897, Tsivilsky Uyezd had a population of 164,284. Of these, 79.9% spoke Chuvash, 10.1% Russian and 10.0% Tatar as their native language.
