= Chuvash Autonomous Oblast =

Administrative division in Russian SFSR (1920–25)

Chuvash Autonomous Oblast Чувашская автономная область
- 1920–1925
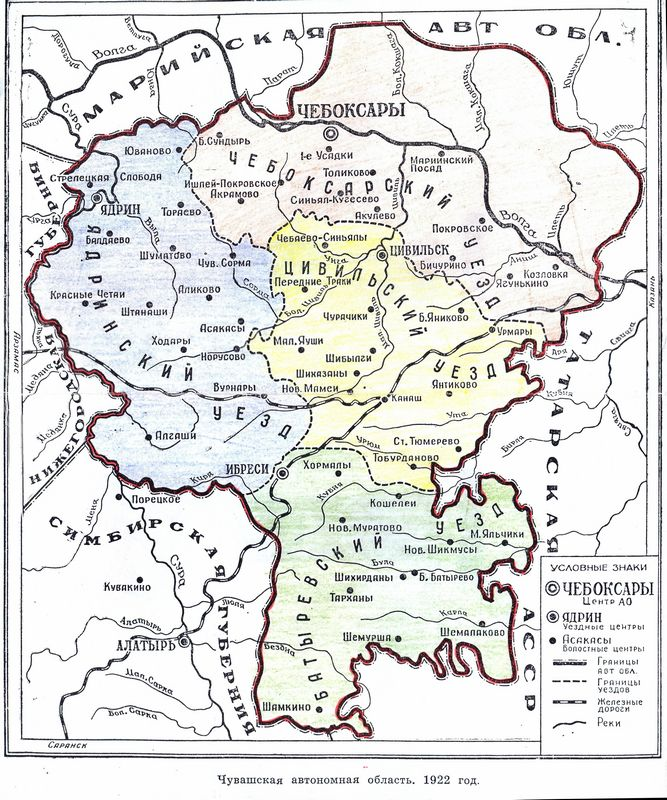
- Map of the Chuvash Autonomous Oblast in 1922 (in Russian)
- Capital: Cheboksary
- Government
  - Type: Union; Marxist–Leninist one-party state
- History
  - Established: June 24 1920
  - Disestablished: April 21 1925
Succeeded by
Chuvash Autonomous Soviet Socialist Republic

The Chuvash Autonomous Oblast (Note: Russian: Чувашская автономная область, romanized: Chuvashskaya avtonomnaya oblast; Chuvash: Чӑваш автономи облаҫӗ, romanized: Çăvaş avtonomi oblacĕ) was an autonomous oblast from 24 June 1920 until 21 April 1925 when the oblast become part of the Chuvash Autonomous Republic. The oblast included a number of counties of the former Kazan and Simbirsk provinces.

== History ==
By the beginning of 1920 under the impact of the Russian Soviet Federative Socialist Republic, a large part of the Chuvash workers determined the idea to raise a central government to issue and grant his people an autonomous status as a special administrative unit. On 3 January 1920, Chuvash People's Commissariat Department presented to the board of the Council of People's Commissars a preliminary report on the special administrative unit. In June, the Political Bureau of the Central Committee of the Russian Communist Party (bolsheviks) discussed the issue and recognized the need of Tsivilsky, Cheboksary, and Yadrinsky counties to form an administrative unit of Chuvash people. On June 22, 1920, the Politburo of the Central Committee of the Communist Party of the Soviet Union approved the autonomy of the Chuvash people and their Chuvash Autonomous Oblast, which was adopted on June 24, 1920 by decree signed by the Chairman of the Council of People's Commissars Vladimir Lenin, the Chairman of the Central Executive Committee of the All-Russian Congress of Soviets Mikhail Kalinin, and the Secretary of the Central Executive Committee Avel Enukidze.

== See also ==
- First Secretary of the Chuvash Communist Party
