= Podberezinsky District, Tatar ASSR =

Former district of the Tatar ASSR

Podberezinsky District (Russian: Подберезинский район; Tatar: Подберезье (Күлле Ил) районы) was a district (raion) of the Tatar ASSR.

It had an area of about 524 square kilometers in 1947 and was divided into 16 selsoviets.

It was established on February 19, 1944. Its administrative center was the village (selo) of Bolshoye Podberezye. On May 14, 1956, the district was abolished and its territory was transferred to Kaybitsky District.
