= Sviyazhsky Uyezd =

Sviyazhsky Uyezd (Свия́жский уе́зд) was one of the subdivisions of the Kazan Governorate of the Russian Empire. It was situated in the central part of the governorate. Its administrative centre was Sviyazhsk.

== Demographics ==
At the time of the Russian Empire Census of 1897, Sviyazhsky Uyezd had a population of 126,603. Of these, 68.6% spoke Russian, 29.9% Tatar and 1.5% Chuvash as their native language.
