= Kaybitsky District =

Kaybitsky District Кайбицкий район (Russian)
- District

Other transcription(s)
  - Tatar: Кайбыч районы
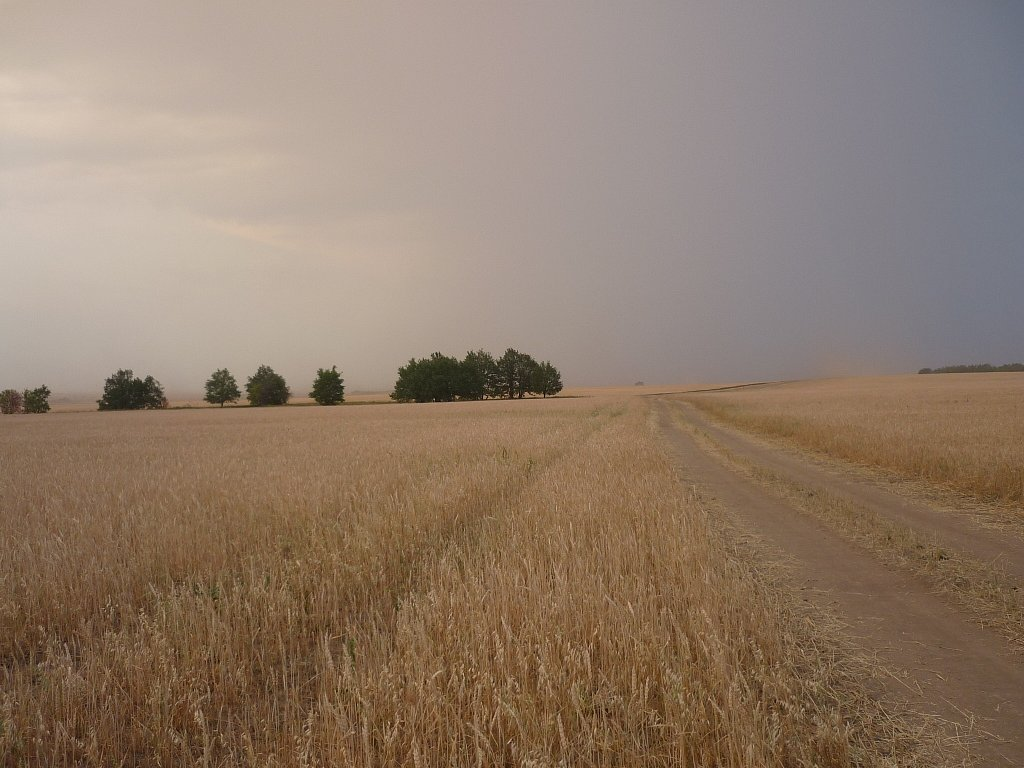
- Grain field, Kaybitsky District

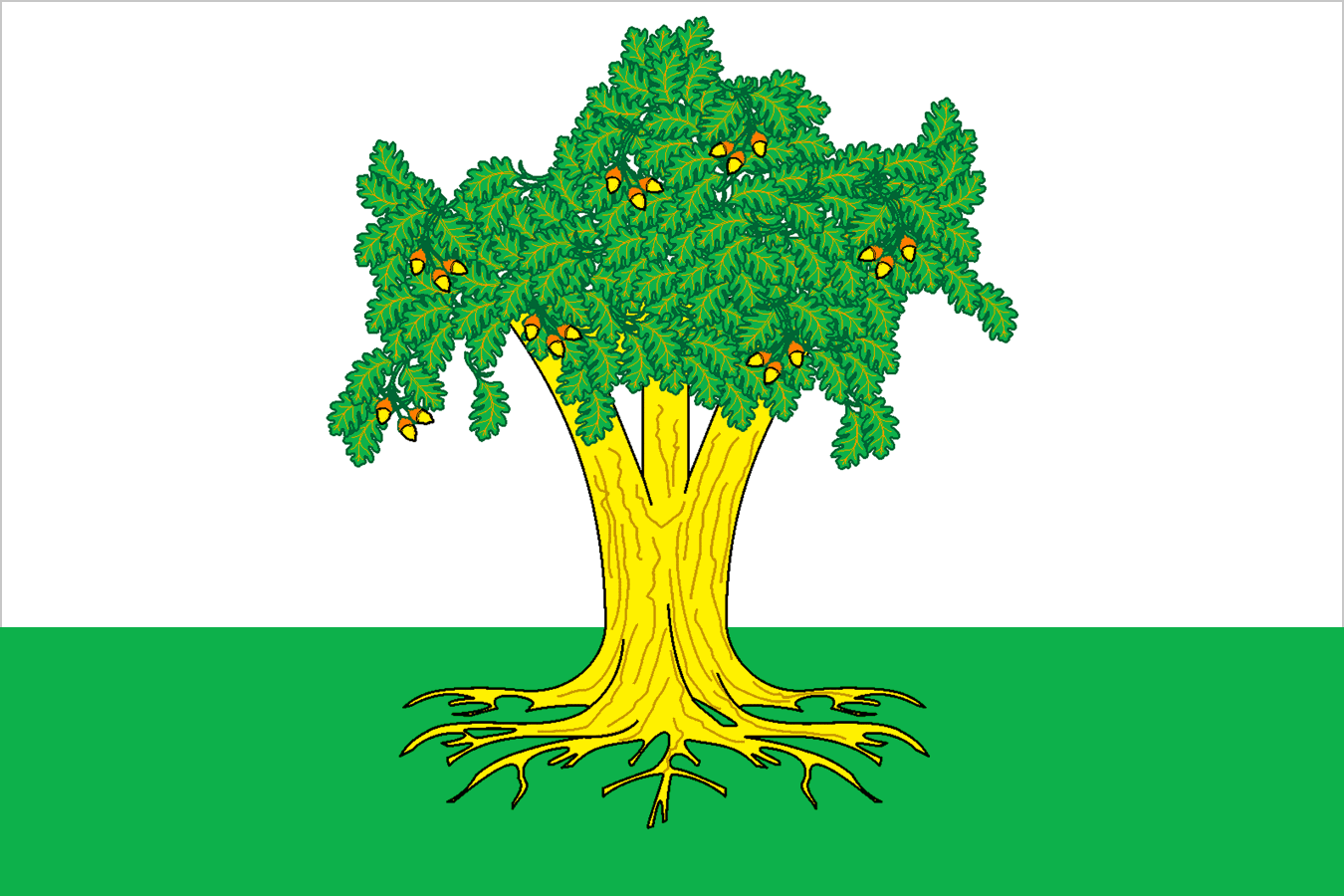
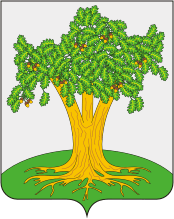
- Flag Coat of arms
- Location of Kaybitsky District in the Republic of Tatarstan
- Coordinates: 55°23′N 48°06′E
- Country: Russia
- Federal subject: Republic of Tatarstan
- Established: 19 April 1991
- Administrative center: Bolshiye Kaybitsy

Area
  - Total: 995.40 km^{2} (384.33 sq mi)

Population (2010 Census)
  - Total: 14,898
  - Density: 14.967/km^{2} (38.764/sq mi)
  - Urban: 0%
  - Rural: 100%

Administrative structure
  - Inhabited localities: 57 rural localities

Municipal structure
  - Municipally incorporated as: Kaybitsky Municipal District
  - Municipal divisions: 0 urban settlements, 17 rural settlements
- Time zone: UTC+3 (MSK)
- OKTMO ID: 92629000
- Website: http://kaybici.tatarstan.ru/

Kaybitsky District (Russian: Кайбицкий райо́н, Tatar: Кайбыч районы) is a territorial administrative unit and municipality of the Republic of Tatarstan within the Russian Federation. The territory of the district includes 57 settlements and 17 rural settlements. Тhe district population was 13,415 at the beginning of 2020. The administrative center is the village of Bolshiye Kaybitsy.

== Geography ==
The region is located in the west of Tatarstan. It shares borders with the Zelenodolsky, Verkhneuslonsky and Apastovskiy districts of the republic, and with Chuvashia (Urmarskiy, Yantikovskiy, Kanashskiy, Komsomolskiy and Yalchikskiy districts). The terrain of the district is a slightly elevated plain with heights of 180–220 meters. The largest river in the district is the Sviyaga. Other large rivers that flow through the district include the Kubnya, Birlya, Uryum, Biya, Cheremshan and Imelli.

== Coat of arms and flag ==
The coat of arms and flag of the district were approved by the decision of the representative body of the Kaybitsky municipal district of the Republic of Tatarstan on December 19, 2005. Their development was carried out by the Heraldic Council under the President of the Republic. The coat of arms has a golden oak topped by a green crown. The mainstay of the economy of the district is agriculture, which is represented by the colors gold and green. The oak is a symbol of longevity, toughness, nobility, and courage. The tree also reflects the multinational composition of the district population which includes Russians, Tatars, and Chuvash among others. The shape of the green leafy crown is modeled after the form traced by the boundaries of the Kaybitsky district. The flag is based on heraldic elements of the coat of arms.

== History ==
The territory of the district used to be located in the Sviyazhsky and Tetyushsky districts of the Kazan province until 1920. The territory then resided in the Sviyazhsky canton of the Tatar ASSR from 1920 to 1927. The Ulyanovsky district with its municipal center at the village of Ulyankovo was formed on February 14, 1927. The administrative center of the district was later moved to Bolshiye Kaybitsy and the district was renamed Kaybitsky. The Podberezinsky district was included in the territory on May 17, 1956. The Kaybitsky district was abolished on January 4, 1963 after the transfer of its territories to the Apastovsky district during reforms aimed at the consolidation of administrative units in the Tatar ASSR. The Kaybitsky district was reestablished on April 19, 1991.

The first head of the newly formed region was Khanifatullin Azat Safinovich. In 1998, he was replaced by Zavdat Rashitovich Gaffarov, who held this position until March 2012. The Kaybitsky municipal district was headed by Rakhmatullin Albert Ilgizarovich.

== Population ==
The ethnic composition of the district is made up primarily of Tatars who compose 67.7% of the district population, with Russians and Chuvash constituting 26.2% and 5.3% of the district population respectively.

== Municipal and administrative status ==
There are 57 settlements in the Kaybitsky district, of which 17 are rural settlements. The administrative centers of rural settlements are the villages: Bagayevo, Bolshiye Kaybitsy, Bolshoye Podberezye, Bolshoye Rusakovo, Burunduki, Kulanga, Kushmany, Malyye Memi, Molkeyevo, Murali, Nadezhdino, Staroye Tyaberdino, Ulyankovo, Fodorovskoye, Khozesanovo, Chuteyevo, and Yebalakovo.

== Economy ==
The ratio of the average monthly wage to the minimum consumer budget increased from 2.02 to 2.21 in the period from 2010 to 2020. According to data from 2019, the average salary of employees of organizations was 24 thousand rubles. The unemployment rate increased slightly from 0.62% in 2013 to 0.78% in 2020.

The main sector of the district economy is agriculture. Gross agricultural output in the district amounted to 391 million rubles in the first half of 2020. Wheat, rye, barley, oats, buckwheat, sugar beets and peas are all cultivated in the district. Meat and dairy cattle breeding, pig farming and sheep ranching are the primary livestock industries in the district. The agricultural sector in the district is developing with the establishment of enterprises such as the “Podberezie” agrofirm which opened in 2019. The main activity of the company is the production of rasp oil.

Leading regional enterprises include the “Kaybitsky fish farm”, “Kulanginsky grain-receiving point” (a branch of “Kazanzernoprodukt”), “Kaybitsky agrokhimservice”, “Kaybitsky specialized seed forestry” and the agricultural firms “Zolotoy Kolos”, “Kubnya” and “Dubravy”. Firms in the district produced goods worth 205 million rubles in the period from January to September 2020.

=== Investment potential ===
According to the Committee of the Republic of Tatarstan for Socio-Economic Monitoring, investment in fixed assets in the district amounted to 363,563 rubles in the period January – June 2020. This sum constituted 0.2% of the total volume of investment in Tatarstan for that period. The main targets for investment were agriculture, hunting and fishing (attracting 92 million in total), and electricity (4.5 million rubles).

The report of the Federal State Statistics Service of the Republic shows that almost 147 million rubles in investment was attracted to the region in 2019 (excluding budgetary funds and income from small businesses), while 176 million was attracted in 2018.

== Transport ==
The village of Bolshiye Kaybitsy is located 120 km south-west of Kazan, 18 km from the Kulanga railway station. The “Sviyazhsk - Buinsk - Ulyanovsk” railway line crosses through the eastern part of the district. The main highways serving the district are the “Bolshiye Kaybitsy - Ulanovo” (exit to R-241, to Kazan) and “Bolshiye Kaybitsy - Old Tyaberdino - A-151” (to Kanash), “Bolshiye Kaybitsy - Apastovo” (to Buinsk).

Federal plans exist to open the “Moscow - Nizhny Novgorod - Kazan” highway by 2024. This section of highway will become a part of the Europe - Western China roadway. The length of this highway will be 145 km, of which 100 km will pass through the Kaybitsky district (from the village of Kamylovo to the village of Malalla). This new section of highway will allow motorists to get from Moscow to Kazan in six and a half hours by car.

== Environment ==
There are natural monuments of regional significance in the district including the “Kaibitsky oak groves”, “Turminskaya dacha”, “Bolshoye lake”, “Lake complex near the village of Novoye Patrikeevo” and “Birlya River”. The district is also home to protected plant and animal species listed in the Red Book of Tatarstan.

== Social welfare and public life ==
There are 44 cultural heritage sites in the district. Educational infrastructure in the district includes 28 secondary schools, 19 preschool institutions and three institutions of supplementary education in the district. The district is also home to a House of Culture, a museum, and a central library. The regional newspaper Kaibitskie Zori (Kaibych tanary) has been publishing in the Russian and Tatar languages since 1933.
