= Sviyazhsky Kanton =

Administrative division of the Tatar ASSR

Sviyazhsky Kanton (Tatar: Зөя кантуны, romanized: Zöyä kantunı, Yaña imlâ زۈيە كانتونىٰ, Russian: Свияжский кантон) was an administrative division (a сanton) of the Tatar ASSR in 1920–1927. The administrative center of the canton was the town of Sviyazhsk.

Sviyazhsky Kanton was created in the territory of former Sviyazhsky Uyezd following the creation of the Tatar ASSR in 1920.

By 1926 it had an area of 3,326 km^{2} and a population of 153 384, 64.3% of whom were Russians, 33.6%—Tatars, and 2.0%—Chuvashs.

In 1926, the canton consisted of 8 volosts. In 1927, Sviyazhsky Kanton was abolished, and 4 districts (Nurlat-Achasyrsky, Sviyazhsky, Tenkovsky, Ulyankovsky) were created in its terrirtory.
