= Apastovsky District =

Apastovsky District Апастовский район (Russian)
- District

Other transcription(s)
  - Tatar: Апас районы
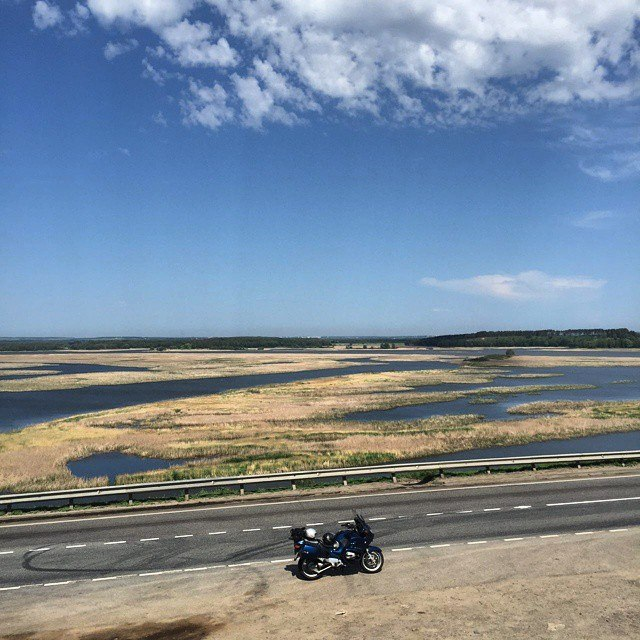
- Sviyaga River, Apastovsky District

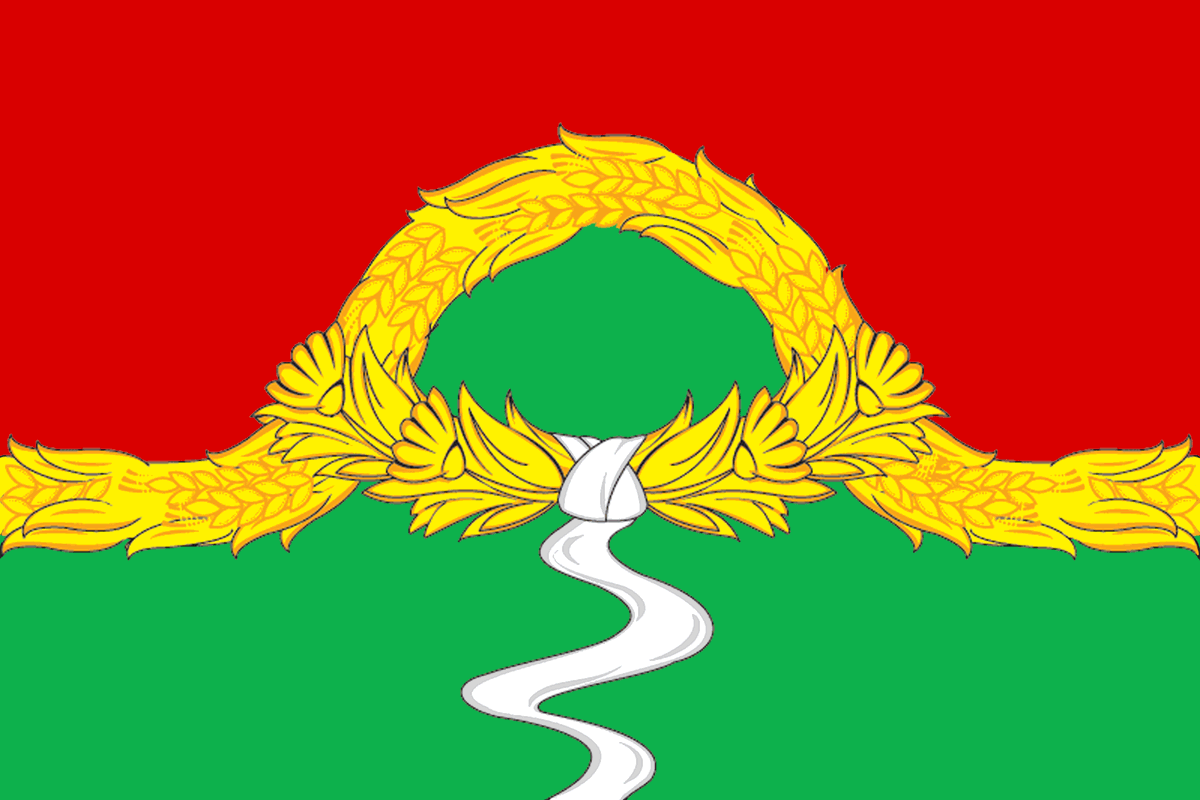
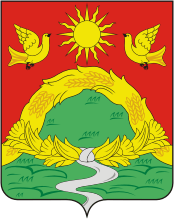
- Flag Coat of arms
- Location of Apastovsky District in the Republic of Tatarstan
- Coordinates: 55°14′N 48°26′E
- Country: Russia
- Federal subject: Republic of Tatarstan
- Established: 10 August 1930
- Administrative center: Apastovo

Area
  - Total: 1,047.5 km^{2} (404.4 sq mi)

Population (2010 Census)
  - Total: 21,627
  - Density: 20.646/km^{2} (53.474/sq mi)
  - Urban: 23.8%
  - Rural: 76.2%

Administrative structure
  - Inhabited localities: 1 urban-type settlements, 72 rural localities

Municipal structure
  - Municipally incorporated as: Apastovsky Municipal District
  - Municipal divisions: 1 urban settlements, 21 rural settlements
- Time zone: UTC+3 (MSK)
- OKTMO ID: 92610000
- Website: http://apastovo.tatarstan.ru/

Apastovsky District (Russian: Апа́стовский райо́н; Tatar: Апас районы) is a territorial administrative unit and municipal district of the Republic of Tatarstan within the Russian Federation. The district is located in the southwest of the region. The territory of the district includes 72 settlements. As of 2020, 19,512 people reside in the region. Administrative centre is the urban-type settlement Apastovo.

== Geography ==
The Apastovsky District is located in the historical region "Hill Bank Land" or Taw yağı of the Golden Horde, Khanate of Kazan and Kazan Governorate. It shares borders with Buinsky District, Tetyushskyy, Kamsko-Ustyinsky, Verkhneuslonsky and Kaybitsky districts of the republic, as well as with the Yalchiksky districts of Chuvashia.

The western part of the district is located on the slope of the Tokmovsky tectonic arch, the rest of the region is on the southwestern side of the Kazan-Kirov trough. The district topography is a hilly plain. All waterways of the territory are part of the Sviyaga basin. Other large rivers flowing through the region with a total length of more than 30 km are the Bula, Ulema, Suhaya Ulema, Biya, Cheremshan and Imelli. The total area of forested areas in the district amounts to 8.9 thousand hectares.

== Coat of arms and flag ==
The development of the coat of arms and the flag was carried out jointly by the Heraldic Council under the President of the Republic of Tatarstan and the Russian Union of Heraldists. The coat of arms was approved by the decision of the Council of the Apastovsky Municipal District of September 30, 2006. The main economic, cultural and geographical features of the region are conveyed on the coat of arms and flag. Ears and a wreath symbolize fertile lands, two orioles represent hard work and spiritual culture, a silver ribbon is a symbol of the Sviyaga River, while the sun is a symbol of warmth and prosperity. The golden color on the coat of arms is a symbol of harvest, wealth, intelligence, respect; silver – purity, perfection, peace, understanding; red – courage, strength, hard work, beauty and celebration; green – a symbol of nature, health, youth, and life growth.

The flag of the Apastovsky region is designed on the basis of the district coat of arms. It is a rectangular canvas which is divided by golden ears into red and green parts, does not include the image of birds.

== History ==
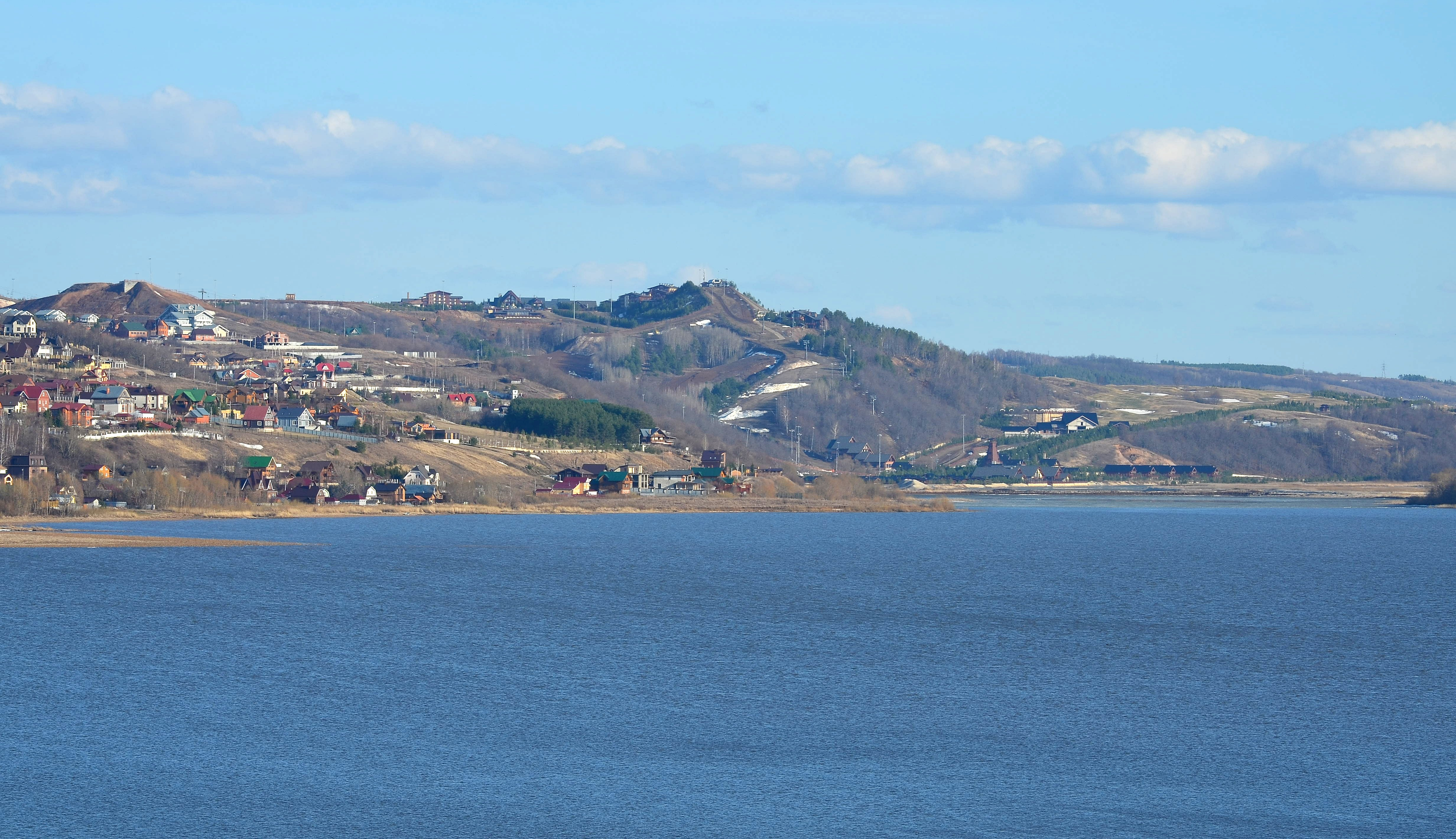
Sviyaga river within the boundaries of the district

There are 120 archaeological sites dating from the Stone, Iron and Bronze Ages, as well as the periods of the Golden Horde and the Khanate of Kazan.

Until 1921, the territory of the region was part of the Tetyushsky district of the Kazan Governorate. From 1920 to 1927, it was a part of the Tetyushsky canton; and until 1930, it was included into the Buinsky canton of the Tatar ASSR. The area in its present form was formed by the Decree of the Presidium of the All-Russian Central Executive Committee of August 10, 1930. At that time, the district included 50 village councils and 70 settlements with a total population of 49,414. Like many others, the district was abolished on February 1, 1963, and its land was transferred to the Buinsky and Tetyushsky Districts. The district was reestablished on March 4, 1964, and on April 19, 1991, the Kaybitsky District was separated from its structure.

The village of Apastovo has been known since the 17th century as a settlement by a lake on the bank of the Sviyaga. There are several theories concerning its origin. According to the first theory, it was founded by people from the village. According to the second version, the settlement was founded by settlers from the village of Starye Yenali. According to this theory, Apastovo could be called Maloye Yenaleevo, and then under this name it has been known colloquially since 1647. It is also believed that the settlement arose from the merger of four nearby settlements.

In the period from 1998 to 2005, the head of the administration of the Apastovsky district was Khanifatullin Azat Safinovich. In 2005, he was replaced by Zagidullin Rashid Nazibovich, who held this position until 2019. As of 2020, the district is managed by Ravil Faritovich Khisamutdinov.

== Population ==
The Apastovsky municipal district includes 73 settlements, which are divided into one urban and 21 rural settlements.

== Economy ==
=== State of the Economy ===
The region is dominated by procurement and processing industrial enterprises. At the end of 2019, the Apastovsky district occupied the 39th place in the rankings of socio-economic development and 27th place in terms of the share of small and medium-sized businesses (SMEs) in the gross regional product of the Republic of Tatarstan, which amounted to 7.3 billion rubles. The average monthly salary in the district is 26 thousand rubles. In the period from 2010 to 2020, the ratio of the average monthly wage to the minimum consumer budget increased from 1.78 to 2.03 times, and the unemployment rate from 2013 to 2020 increased from 0.68% to 1.83%. In the first half of 2020, the gross value of goods exported from the region amounted to 205 million rubles (for comparison, this figure for the entirety of the year 2013 was 415 million).

=== Agriculture ===
Agriculture is the backbone of the region's economy. The district predominantly produces crops such as wheat, rye, barley, oats, buckwheat, peas, sugar beets and potatoes. Meat and pastoral farming, pig farming, sheep farming and poultry farming are also well developed. The agricultural enterprises "Sviyaga", "Tabar", "Agroaktiv" as well as agricultural enterprises named after Rakhimov, "Alga", "Ibragimov and Co", "RiF", "Yana Yul", "Druzhba", "Agrozit", "Raduga", the "Karatunskoe grain-receiving enterprise", "Kainar ikmek", "Vkusny Khleb", as well as 17 peasant farms operate in the district. The largest investor in the region is the Ak Bars Holding. The gross production of the agricultural complex of the Apastovsky district amounted to about 2 billion rubles in 2019. In the first half of 2020, gross agricultural output amounted to 505 million rubles. In comparison to 2013, this figure was almost 1.3 billion.

=== Investment potential ===
According to the assessment of the Committee of the Republic of Tatarstan for Social and Economic Monitoring, investment in fixed assets in January-June 2020 in the Apastovsky district amounted to 460,563 thousand rubles, or 0.2% of the total investment in Tatarstan of that period. By the share of investment in 2020, the leading fields were the development of agriculture, hunting and fishing at 81.5 million rubles. According to the report of the Federal State Statistics Service of the Republic, in 2019 almost 278 million rubles of investments were attracted (excepting budgetary funds and income from small businesses), compared to 460 million in the previous year in 2018.

=== Transport ===
Apastovo is located 109 km from Kazan on the Kazan - Ulyanovsk highway and 11 km southeast of the Karatun railway station. The R-241 "Kazan - Buinsk - Ulyanovsk" highway passes through the territory of the district next to the regional center. Another important road is the "Bolshiye Kaybitsy - Apastovo - Tetyushi", "Shonguty -Kamskoye Ustye" route. The railway line "Sviyzhsk - Ulyanovsk" runs to the west of the regional center with stations and stopping points in the area (from Kazan): including a stopping point at 55 km, the Klyuchi (passing), Karatun and Kildurazy stations.

In the fall of 2018, the Russian government approved a plan for the construction of a 730 km long Moscow-Nizhny Novgorod-Kazan highway. On the territory of Tatarstan, the route will pass through the Kaibitsky, Apastovsky, Verkhneuslonsky, Kamsko-Ustinsky, Laishevsky, and Pestrechinsky Districts. The highway will become part of the Europe - Western China international transport corridor. Construction is planned to be completed in 2024.

== Ecology ==
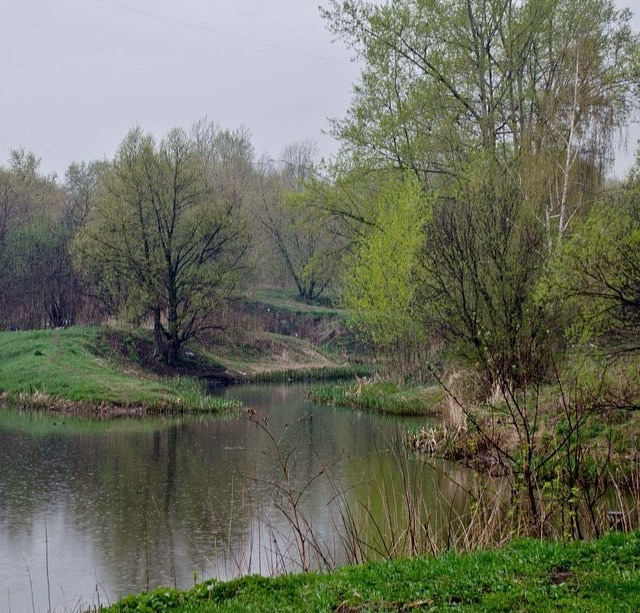
"Gran-Tau", Churu-Baryshevskaya forest-steppe

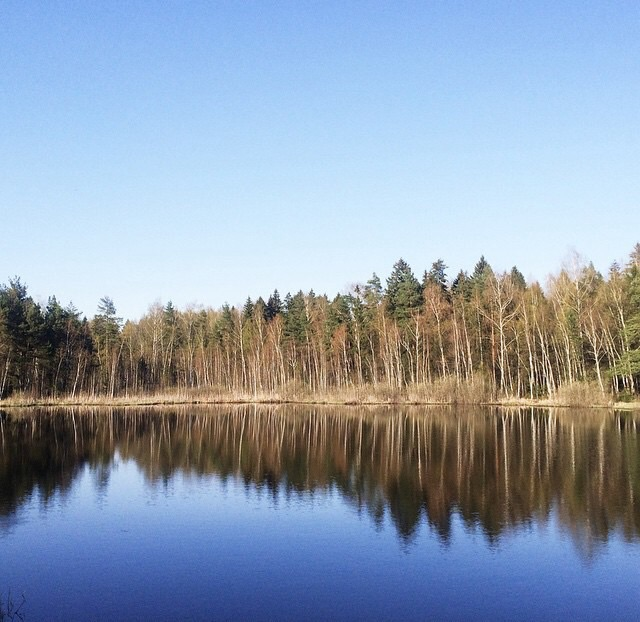
"Gran-Tau", Churu-Baryshevskaya forest-steppe

Specially protected natural areas of the region occupy 1275.9 hectares, which is 1.3% of the total area of the region. On this territory are located natural monuments of regional significance: "Gran-Tau", "Habitat of Marshall's crested", "Petrov ugol", "Staritsa Sviyagi" and the rivers Sviyaga and Ulema. These regions provide a sanctuary for endangered animals listed in the Red Book of Tatarstan.

== Social services and culture ==
Education in the district is provided by 22 secondary schools, an agricultural college, 37 preschool children's institutions, two children and youth sports schools, a children's art school with two branches, a Selet children's creativity center and a Sviyaga children's health center. The district's sports infrastructure is represented by 97 sports facilities, including an ice rink, universal sports grounds, gyms, shooting ranges, hockey rinks, football fields and more. In the field of culture, there is the district House of Culture as well as 25 rural houses of culture and 35 clubs, 29 libraries, four museums, the Mikrodisk folk film studio and the Yoldyzlar folk theater. Moreover, 51 mosques have opened in the district. Since 1932, the regional newspaper "Yoldyz" ("Star") has been published in Tatar and Russian. In 2008, the local TV company "Apas Heberlere" was opened.

=== Cultural monuments ===
- Memorial in honor of the 40th anniversary of Victory in the Great Patriotic War, opened in 1985 in Apastovo (sculptor – V.M. Vasiliev). In 2010, in honor of the 65th anniversary of Victory, a complex "Alley of Heroes" was erected on the territory of the memorial (the author is the former head of the Apastovsky district, Rashid Zagidullin), incorporating the names of more than 11,000 local residents who participated in the war.
- The Monument to the "Woman-Mother", opened in 2000 in Apastovo (author – F. Faskhetdinov), in 2007 the names of women who made a worthy contribution to the development of the region and the republic were additionally added here.
- Busts to singer and composer Sara Sadíqova, People's Poet Shaukat Galiev, Counter admiral Ivan Zolin, People's Artist of the TASSR and RSFSR Fakhri Nasretdinov, Chairman of the Supreme Court of the RSFSR Alexander Orlov were all installed in Apastovo in 2015-2016.
