= Buinsky District =

Buinsky District Буинский район (Russian)
- District

Other transcription(s)
  - Tatar: Буа районы
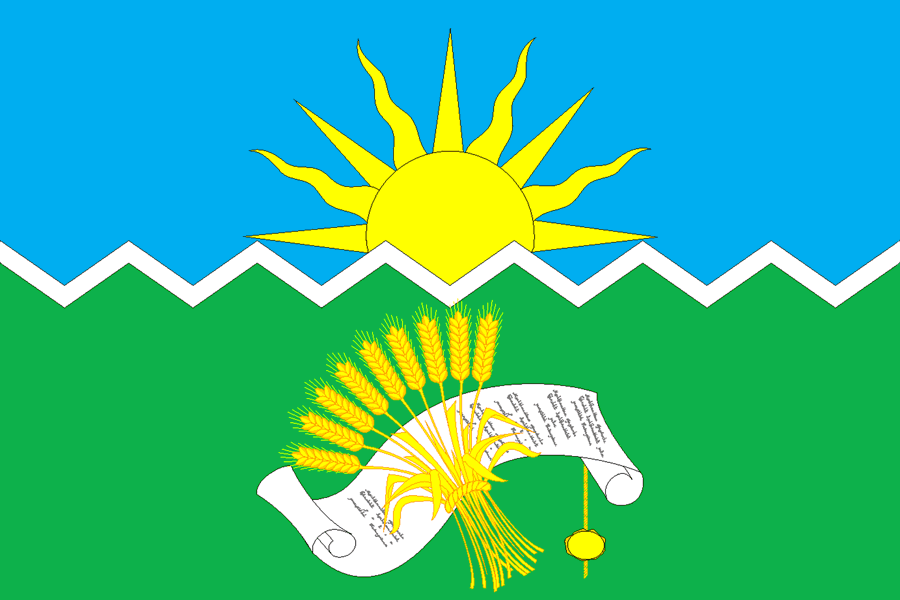
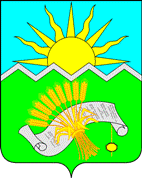
- Flag Coat of arms
- Location of Buinsky District in the Republic of Tatarstan
- Coordinates: 54°57′N 48°11′E
- Country: Russia
- Federal subject: Republic of Tatarstan
- Established: 10 August 1930
- Administrative center: Buinsk

Area
  - Total: 1,543 km^{2} (596 sq mi)

Population (2010 Census)
  - Total: 25,101
  - Density: 16.27/km^{2} (42.13/sq mi)
  - Urban: 0%
  - Rural: 100%

Administrative structure
  - Inhabited localities: 96 rural localities

Municipal structure
  - Municipally incorporated as: Buinsky Municipal District
  - Municipal divisions: 1 urban settlements, 30 rural settlements
- Time zone: UTC+3 (MSK)
- OKTMO ID: 92618000
- Website: http://buinsk.tatarstan.ru/

Buinsky District (Russian: Буинский райо́н; Tatar: Буа районы) is a territorial administrative unit and municipality of the Republic of Tatarstan within the Russian Federation. The district is located in the southwest of the republic and occupies a total area of 1,543 square kilometers (596 sq mi). According to the 2010 census, the municipality had a population of 25,101. As of the beginning of 2020, the population had grown to 41,587. The district currently consists of 98 settlements.

The administrative center of the district, the town of Buinsk, is not included within the administrative structure of the district. The settlement first appeared in historical records dating to 1703. Its name is derived from the Tatar word “bua”, meaning “dam”.

== Geography ==
The Buinsky municipal district occupies a total land area of 1543.6 km^{2}. It shares borders with the Drozhzhanovsky district in the south-west, with Apastovsky in the north, Tetyushsky in the east, with the Ulyanovsk region in the south, and with Chuvashia in the west.

The terrain of the district is a hilly plain with heights rising to as high as 150–200 meters. The largest river, the Sviyaga, flows between forest-steppe and steppe zones. Its tributaries include the Karla, Bula, Ulema, Tsilna and Malaya Tsilna. Forests cover 9,681 hectares of the region. The local climate is temperate continental which creates favorable conditions for cattle breeding and agriculture. There are 125 archeological monuments on the territory of the region.

== Flag and Coat of Arms ==
The azure and green field is crossed by a thin jagged silver belt; in the azure there is a shining golden sun (without showing its face), and in the greenery there are a bunch of golden sifted wheat placed on the right, followed by a silver scroll with a gold seal on a cord of the same metal coming out on the bottom right and placed on the left.

— Official description of the emblem.

In June 2006, the Council of the Buinsky municipal district approved its new heraldic insignia. The design was carried out by the Heraldic Council under the President of the Republic of Tatarstan together with the Union of Heraldists of Russia. For centuries the territory of the Buinsky district was a natural divide protecting the region from nomadic raids — this is symbolically represented on the canvas by a jagged dividing line. The sifted wheat allegorizes the developed agriculture of the district; the green field indicates the abundance of local nature and health. The gold color is a symbol of rich harvests, wealth, stability and respect. The setting sun emphasizes the border position of the region and its location in the southwest of the republic. The scroll points to the rich history of the Buinsk lands and as the homeland of outstanding writers, poets, artists and politicians. Silver is a symbol of purity, perfection, peace and tolerance. The blue sky signifies the dignity and spirituality of the locals.

The flag is based on heraldic elements of the coat of arms. A rectangular canvas with a width to length ratio of 2:3 is divided horizontally by a white line into green and blue stripes. The rising sun is depicted in the upper band, and a scroll and sifted wheat are placed on the field.

== History ==
According to available archeological records, the first settlements on the territory of the modern Buinsky district emerged in the Stone Age, that is, approximately X-VI thousand years BC. In the early Middle Ages, the peoples of the Imenkov culture lived here and primarily engaged in agriculture. At the time of Volga Bulgaria, there were already several dozen settlements in this area.

Settlements on the site of the modern town of Buinsk were first mentioned in historical records in the mid-17th century. On September 15, 1780, Empress Catherine the Great granted the village of Buinskoye, also known as Arkhangelskoye, the status of a town.

Until 1921, the territory was part of the Buinsky county (uyezd) of the Simbirsk province. In the 1920s-1930s it belonged to the Buinsky canton. On August 10, 1930, the Presidium of the All-Russian Central Executive Committee adopted a decree on the formation of the district as an independent unit within the Tatar ASSR. In 1959, part of the abolished Tsilninsky district was annexed to the Buinsk district. Four years later the territories of Drozhzhanovsky, Kaibitsky and part of the Apastovsky districts would be joined to the territory, increasing the total area of the canton to 4123 km^{2}. In 1966, the Drozhzhanovsky district was again made a separate territory. On January 31, 2005, the Buinsky district was established in its present form by a regional law.

== Administrative and municipal status ==
Within the framework of administrative divisions, the Buinsky district is one of the forty-three in the republic. The town of Buinsk serves as its administrative center, despite being incorporated separately as a town of republic significance — an administrative unit with status equal to that of the districts.

As a municipal division, the district is incorporated as the Buinsky Municipal District, with the town of republic significance of Buinsk being incorporated within it as the Buinsk urban settlement. In 1998–2007, the district was headed by Aglyam K. Sadretdinov, followed by Rafael K. Abuzyarov from 2007 to 2013. In 2013, Azat K. Aizetullov was elected to the post of head of the municipal district, holding this position until 2017. Aizetullov was subsequently replaced by Marat A. Zyabbarov who occupied this post until September 2020, when he was transferred to another position. Following Zyabbarov, Ranis R. Kamartdinov became the head of the municipal district.

In total, 48.2% of the district's population live the town of Buinsk. According to data from the 2010 census, Tatars make up the majority of the population while 20% are Chuvashs, and 13% are Russians.

== Economy ==
=== Industry ===
The region is home to large enterprises such as the local branches of Tatspirtprom and “Tatarstan-sete”, Akhmametevskii elektromekhanicheskii zavod (Akhmametyevsk electromechanical plant), Buinskii mashinostroitelnyi zavod (Buinsky machine-building plant), Sakharnyi zavod (Sugar plant), Buinskii maslosyrkombinat (Buinsk butter and cheese plant), Buinskaia mezhkhoziaistvennaia stroitelnaia organizatciia (Buinsk inter-industrial construction organization), Buinskaya PMK-6, “Gidroservis”, EPU «Buinskgaz” and others. The majority of large enterprises of the region belong to the food industry sector and are mainly located in the administrative center as well as in the village of Laschi. In the first half of 2020, the amount of goods exported by the region amounted to 3.7 billion rubles. This amount exceeded the sum total of exports by the region for the entirety of 2013, which amounted to 3.3 billion rubles.

=== Agriculture ===
The region is part of the Predvolzhskaya economic zone and is one of the three most productive agricultural regions in Tatarstan. The leading industries are beet and grain farming, cattle breeding and pig breeding, which collectively account for 95% the annual gross product of the district. The district contains 119,300 hectares of farmland, 96,500 hectares of which are arable. The main cultivated crops are spring and winter wheat, rye, barley, peas, and sugar beets. Overall, five agricultural enterprises, 70 farms, 8 limited liability companies, one open joint-stock company and one production and agricultural cooperative operate in the region. Among the leading agricultural enterprises in the district are Niva, Chernov, Druzhba, Avangard, Vamin-Bua, Commune, Bola, Tinchali, Runga, Bua, Churakovo, Cherken, Kiyatskoye and others. In the first half of 2020, the region's gross agricultural output amounted to 1.4 billion rubles.

=== Investment Potential ===
In the period from 2010 to 2020, the ratio of the average monthly wage to the minimum consumer budget increased from 1.92 to 2.2. The unemployment rate from 2013 to 2020 rose from 0.66% to 1.74% respectively. According to the Committee of the Republic of Tatarstan for Social and Economic Monitoring, investment in fixed assets from January–June 2020 in the Buinsky district amounted to 978 million rubles, or 0.5% of total investment in Tatarstan. The largest investments were allocated to the development of agriculture, hunting and fishing to the sum of 186 million rubles.

According to the Federal State Statistics Service of the Republic of Tatarstan, the district attracted almost 472 million rubles in investment in 2019. Excluding budget funds and income from small businesses this level of investment in 2019 was 100 million less than in the previous year.

=== Transport ===
Buinsk is 137 km away from Kazan. The “Ulyanovsk—Sviyazhsk” railway line, the “Kazan—Ulyanovsk”, “Buinsk—Tetyushi”, and “Buinsk—Yalchik” highways pass through the district.

== Ecology ==
Nature reserves and wildlife sanctuaries cover a total of 1688 hectares, of which 1509 hectares belong to the Zeya Buylary reserve. Natural monuments in the district include the Sviyaga River, the park of the Decembrist Vasily P. Ivashev's family estate, the Novo-Tinchalinskaya marmot colony in the valley of the Bolshaya Taurus River and the Utinskaya marmot colony on the steppe slopes of the Karla River valley.

== Culture and Society ==
The district is served by 42 educational institutions, three vocational schools, 42 kindergartens and two supplementary education establishments. Sports facilities in the district include a stadium for 1,500 seats, the ice palace “Arktika”, a sports complex “Dolphin”, children's and youth sports schools “Arktika”, “Batyr” and “Yunost”, as well as a number of gyms and shooting ranges. The district's cultural resources are represented by the House of Culture, 54 clubs, 36 libraries, 3 museums, and 15 school museums. Since 1919, the regional newspaper “Bayrak” (“Banner”) has been published in Russian and Tatar languages. In 1962, a copy of the newspaper in Chuvash (“Yalav”) began to be published. In 2000, the local TV and radio company “Bua dulkynnnary” was founded.

=== Famous Residents ===
- Medvedeva Maria Grigorievna (1869, the village of Ivashevka in Simbirsk province—1951, Ulyanovsk) — Hero of Labor.
- Ivashev, Pyotr Nikiforovich (1767–1838) - Russian military engineer, major general, participant in the Russian-Turkish war, Patriotic War of 1812, and foreign campaigns in 1813–1814.

== Bibliography ==
- Abzalov, L.F. (2010). Buinskaia entciklopediia [Buinsk encyclopedia]. Kazan: Tatmedia.
- Bushuev, A.S.; Salikhov, R.R., ed. (2014). Istoriko-kulturnyi atlas Buinskogo raiona Respubliki Tatarstan [Historical and cultural atlas of Buinsky district of the Republic of Tatarstan]. Kazan: Foliant.
- Khasanov, M., ed. (2008). Tatarskie seleniya Iugo-Vostochnogo Zakamia: ochagi prosveshcheniia i kultury [Tatar Settlements of the South-Eastern Zakamye: centers of education and culture]. Kazan: Institut Tatarskoi Entsiklopedii.
- Pospelov, E. M. (2003). Geograficheskie nazvaniia mira. Toponimicheskii slovar' [Geographic names of the world. Toponymic dictionary]. Moscow: Russkie slovari, Astrel, AST.
- Safiullin, N.A.; Faizrakhmanov, D. I.; Savushkina, L. N. (2019). "Sostoianie i faktory effektivnosti razmeshcheniia selskokhoziaistvennogo proizvodstva v Buinskom raione RT [State and efficiency factors for the location of agricultural production in the Buinsky district of the Republic of Tatarstan]". Nauchnye Trudy Mezhdunarodnoi Nauchno-prakticheskoi Konferentcii "Selskoe Khoziaistvo I Prodovolstvennaia Bezopasnost: Tekhnologii, Innovatcii, Rynki, Kadry": 742–745.
- Valeev, R.M.; Nogmanov, A.I.; Shaidullin, R.V. (2009). Istoriia Rossii i Tatarstana: itogi i perspektivy entciklopedicheskikh issledovanii [History of Russia and Tatarstan: Results and Prospects of Encyclopedic Research]. Kazan: In-t Tatar. entciklopedii AN RT.
