= Bolshiye Kaybitsy =

Village and administrative center in the Kaybitsky District in Tatarstan

Coordinates: 55.4014°N 48.1833°E

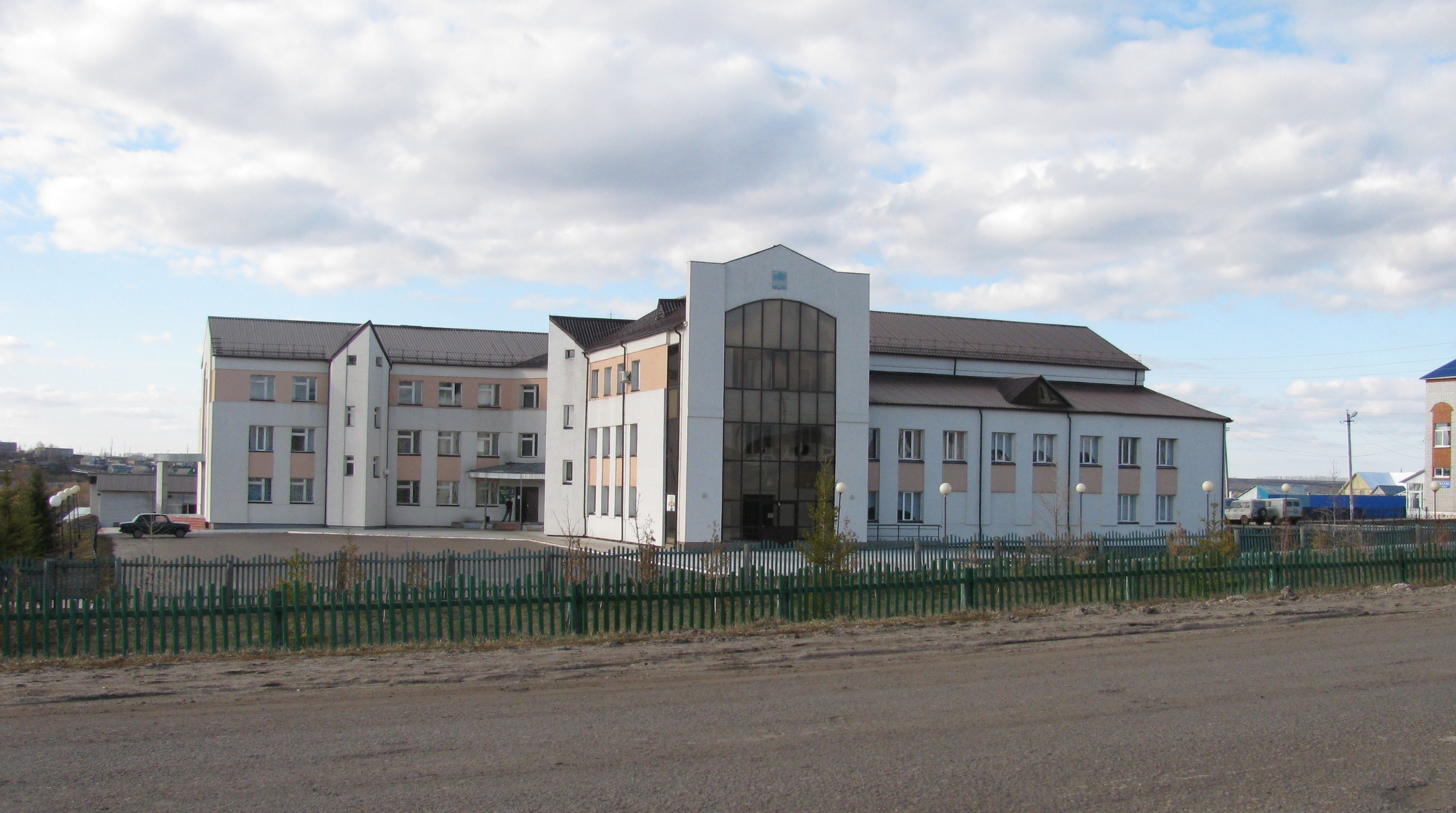
Administration building in Olı Qaybıç

Bolshiye Kaybitsy (Tatar: Olı Qaybıç, Олы Кайбыч) is a village in the Republic of Tatarstan in Russia. It is the administrative center of Kaybitsky District in Tatarstan.

== Geography ==
Bolshiye Kaybitsy is located in southwestern Tatarstan, 110 km (68 mi) from Kazan. The village spans both banks of the river Birla River, a tributary of the Sviyaga River.

== Population ==
The population of Bolshiye Kaybitsy in several different years:

- 1989: 942
- 1997: 1409
- 2010: 1600

== History ==
The village was established in the time of the Khanate of Kazan.

Until 1920, the village was in Ulyanovsk volost in Sviazhsky Uyezd of Kazan Governorate. The area underwent several administrative changes until the Kaybitsky District was established on April 19, 1991.

In 2005 and 2006, a road bypassing Bolshiye Kaybitsy was built, decreasing traffic through the village. Bus transportation to Kazan and the Zelenodolsk Kulanga station from Bolshiye Kaybitsy is, however, still possible.
