= Tatar Mämätxucası =

Tatar Mämätxucası Татар Мәмәтхуҗасы
- selo
- Location within Tatarstan
- Country: Russia
- Region: Tatarstan
- District: Yuğarı Oslan District
- Time zone: UTC+3:00

Tatar Mämätxucası (Tatar: Татар Мәмәтхуҗасы, romanized: Tatar Mämätxucası) is a rural locality (a selo) in Yuğarı Oslan District, Tatarstan. The population was 98 as of 2010.

== Geography ==
Tatar Mämätxucası is located 30 km southwest of Yuğarı Oslan, district's administrative centre, and 68 km southwest of Qazan, republic's capital, by road.

== History ==
The earliest known record of the settlement dates from 1614.

From 18th to the first half of the 19th centuries village's residents belonged to the social estate of state peasants.

By the beginning of the twentieth century, village had a mosque, a mekteb and 5 small shops.

Before the creation of the Tatar ASSR in 1920 was a part of Zöyä Uyezd of Qazan Governorate. Since 1920 was a part of Zöyä Canton; after the creation of districts in Tatar ASSR (Tatarstan) in Tämte (1927–1931), Yuğarı Oslan (1931–1963), Yäşel Üzän (1963–1965) and Yuğarı Oslan districts.
