= Baqçasaray, Verkhneuslonsky District =

Baqçasaray Бакчасарай
- posyolok
- Location within Tatarstan
- Country: Russia
- Region: Tatarstan
- District: Yuğarı Oslan District
- Time zone: UTC+3:00

Baqçasaray (Tatar: Бакчасарай, romanized: Baqçasaray) is a rural locality (a posyolok) in Yuğarı Oslan District, Tatarstan. The population was 161 as of 2010.

== Geography ==
Baqçasaray, Verkhneuslonsky District is located 23 km south of Yuğarı Oslan, district's administrative centre, and 58 km southwest of Qazan, republic's capital, by road.

== History ==
The village was established in 1923.

Until 1927 was a part of Zöyä Canton; after the creation of districts in Tatar ASSR (Tatarstan) in Tämte (1927–1931), Yuğarı Oslan (1931–1963), Yäşel Üzän (1963–1965) and Yuğarı Oslan districts.
