= Tatar Maqılı =

Tatar Maqılı Татар Макылы
- derevnya
- Location within Tatarstan
- Country: Russia
- Region: Tatarstan
- District: Yuğarı Oslan District
- Time zone: UTC+3:00

Tatar Maqılı (Tatar: Татар Макылы, romanized: Tatar Maqılı) is a rural locality (a derevnya) in Yuğarı Oslan District, Tatarstan. The population was 166 as of 2010.

== Geography ==
Tatar Maqılı is located 25 km southwest of Yuğarı Oslan, district's administrative centre, and 60 km southwest of Qazan, republic's capital, by road.

== History ==
The earliest known record of the settlement dates from mid-17th century.

From 18th to the first half of the 19th centuries village's residents belonged to the social estate of state peasants.

By the beginning of the twentieth century, village had a mosque and a small shop.

Before the creation of the Tatar ASSR in 1920 was a part of Zöyä Uyezd of Qazan Governorate. Since 1920 was a part of Zöyä Canton; after the creation of districts in Tatar ASSR (Tatarstan) in Tämte (1927–1931), Yuğarı Oslan (1931–1935), Tämte (1935–1958), Yuğarı Oslan (1958–1963), Yäşel Üzän (1963–1965) and Yuğarı Oslan districts.
