= Yaña Yul, Verkhneuslonsky District =

Yaña Yul Яңа Юл
- posyolok
- Location within Tatarstan
- Country: Russia
- Region: Tatarstan
- District: Yuğarı Oslan District
- Time zone: UTC+3:00

Yaña Yul (Tatar: Яңа Юл, romanized: Yaña Yul) is a rural locality (a posyolok) in Yuğarı Oslan District, Tatarstan. The population was 111 as of 2010.

== Geography ==
Yaña Yul, Verkhneuslonsky District is located 27 km south of Yuğarı Oslan, district's administrative centre, and 61 km southwest of Qazan, republic's capital, by road.

== History ==
The village was established in 1924.

Until 1927 was a part of Zöyä Canton; after the creation of districts in Tatar ASSR (Tatarstan) in Tämte (1927–1931), Yuğarı Oslan (1931–1963), Yäşel Üzän (1963–1965) and Yuğarı Oslan districts.
