= Mullanur Waxitof isemendäge =

Mullanur Waxitof isemendäge Мулланур Вахитов исемендәге
- derevnya
- Location within Tatarstan
- Country: Russia
- Region: Tatarstan
- District: Yuğarı Oslan District
- Time zone: UTC+3:00

Mullanur Waxitof isemendäge (Tatar: Мулланур Вахитов исемендәге, romanized: Mullanur Waxitof isemendäge) is a rural locality (a derevnya) in Yuğarı Oslan District, Tatarstan. The population was 203 as of 2010.

== Geography ==
Mullanur Waxitof isemendäge is located 25 km south of Yuğarı Oslan, district's administrative centre, and 57 km southwest of Qazan, republic's capital, by road.

== History ==
The village was established in 1919 or 1920.

Until 1927 was a part of Zöyä Canton; after the creation of districts in Tatar ASSR (Tatarstan) in Tämte (1927–1931), Yuğarı Oslan (1931–1963), Yäşel Üzän (1963–1965) and Yuğarı Oslan districts.
