= Studenets, Russia =

Studenets (Russian: Студенец) is the name of several rural localities in Russia.

== Bryansk Oblast ==
As of 2010, two rural localities in Bryansk Oblast bear this name:

- Studenets, Pochepsky District, Bryansk Oblast, a settlement in Tretyakovsky Selsoviet of Pochepsky District
- Studenets, Rognedinsky District, Bryansk Oblast, a village in Voronovsky Selsoviet of Rognedinsky District

== Ivanovo Oblast ==
As of 2010, two rural localities in Ivanovo Oblast bear this name:

- Studenets, Gavrilovo-Posadsky District, Ivanovo Oblast, a village in Gavrilovo-Posadsky District
- Studenets, Zavolzhsky District, Ivanovo Oblast, a village in Zavolzhsky District

== Kaluga Oblast ==
As of 2010, one rural locality in Kaluga Oblast bears this name:

- Studenets, Kaluga Oblast, a selo in Zhizdrinsky District

== Kirov Oblast ==
As of 2010, one rural locality in Kirov Oblast bears this name:

- Studenets, Kirov Oblast, a village under the administrative jurisdiction of Oktyabrsky City District of the city of Kirov

== Komi Republic ==
As of 2010, one rural locality in the Komi Republic bears this name:

- Studenets, Komi Republic, a settlement in Studenets Administrative Territory of Ust-Vymsky District

== Kostroma Oblast ==
As of 2010, one rural locality in Kostroma Oblast bears this name:

- Studenets, Kostroma Oblast, a village in Klevantsovskoye Settlement of Ostrovsky District

== Republic of Mordovia ==
As of 2010, one rural locality in the Republic of Mordovia bears this name:

- Studenets, Republic of Mordovia, a selo in Studenetsky Selsoviet of Zubovo-Polyansky District

== Nizhny Novgorod Oblast ==
As of 2010, one rural locality in Nizhny Novgorod Oblast bears this name:

- Studenets, Nizhny Novgorod Oblast, a village in Novolikeyevsky Selsoviet of Kstovsky District

== Oryol Oblast ==
As of 2010, one rural locality in Oryol Oblast bears this name:

- Studenets, Oryol Oblast, a village in Podberezovsky Selsoviet of Mtsensky District

== Penza Oblast ==
As of 2010, two rural localities in Penza Oblast bear this name:

- Studenets, Kamensky District, Penza Oblast, a railway station in Fedorovsky Selsoviet of Kamensky District
- Studenets, Narovchatsky District, Penza Oblast, a selo in Pleskovsky Selsoviet of Narovchatsky District

== Pskov Oblast ==
As of 2010, two rural localities in Pskov Oblast bear this name:

- Studenets, Nevelsky District, Pskov Oblast, a village in Nevelsky District
- Studenets, Porkhovsky District, Pskov Oblast, a village in Porkhovsky District

== Ryazan Oblast ==
As of 2010, four rural localities in Ryazan Oblast bear this name:

- Studenets, Mikhaylovsky District, Ryazan Oblast, a village in Mishinsky Rural Okrug of Mikhaylovsky District
- Studenets, Pronsky District, Ryazan Oblast, a village in Pogorelovsky Rural Okrug of Pronsky District
- Studenets, Spassky District, Ryazan Oblast, a settlement in Isadsky Rural Okrug of Spassky District
- Studenets, Zakharovsky District, Ryazan Oblast, a village in Polivanovsky Rural Okrug of Zakharovsky District

== Smolensk Oblast ==
As of 2010, one rural locality in Smolensk Oblast bears this name:

- Studenets, Smolensk Oblast, a village in Studenetskoye Rural Settlement of Shumyachsky District

== Republic of Tatarstan ==
As of 2010, one rural locality in the Republic of Tatarstan bears this name:

- Studenets, Republic of Tatarstan, a village in Verkhneuslonsky District

== Tver Oblast ==
As of 2010, two rural localities in Tver Oblast bear this name:

- Studenets, Ostashkovsky District, Tver Oblast, a village in Ostashkovsky District
- Studenets, Zharkovsky District, Tver Oblast, a village in Zharkovsky District

== Ulyanovsk Oblast ==
As of 2010, two rural localities in Ulyanovsk Oblast bear this name:

- Studenets, Kuzovatovsky District, Ulyanovsk Oblast, a selo in Bezvodovsky Rural Okrug of Kuzovatovsky District
- Studenets, Sursky District, Ulyanovsk Oblast, a selo under the administrative jurisdiction of Sursky Settlement Okrug of Sursky District

== Vologda Oblast ==
As of 2010, one rural locality in Vologda Oblast bears this name:

- Studenets, Vologda Oblast, a village in Rostilovsky Selsoviet of Gryazovetsky District

== Yaroslavl Oblast ==
As of 2010, two rural localities in Yaroslavl Oblast bear this name:

- Studenets, Pereslavsky District, Yaroslavl Oblast, a village in Lychensky Rural Okrug of Pereslavsky District
- Studenets, Tutayevsky District, Yaroslavl Oblast, a village in Metenininsky Rural Okrug of Tutayevsky District
