= Studenets, Republic of Tatarstan =

Rural locality in Yuğarı Oslan District, Tatarstan

Coordinates: 55°43′51″N 48°59′04″E

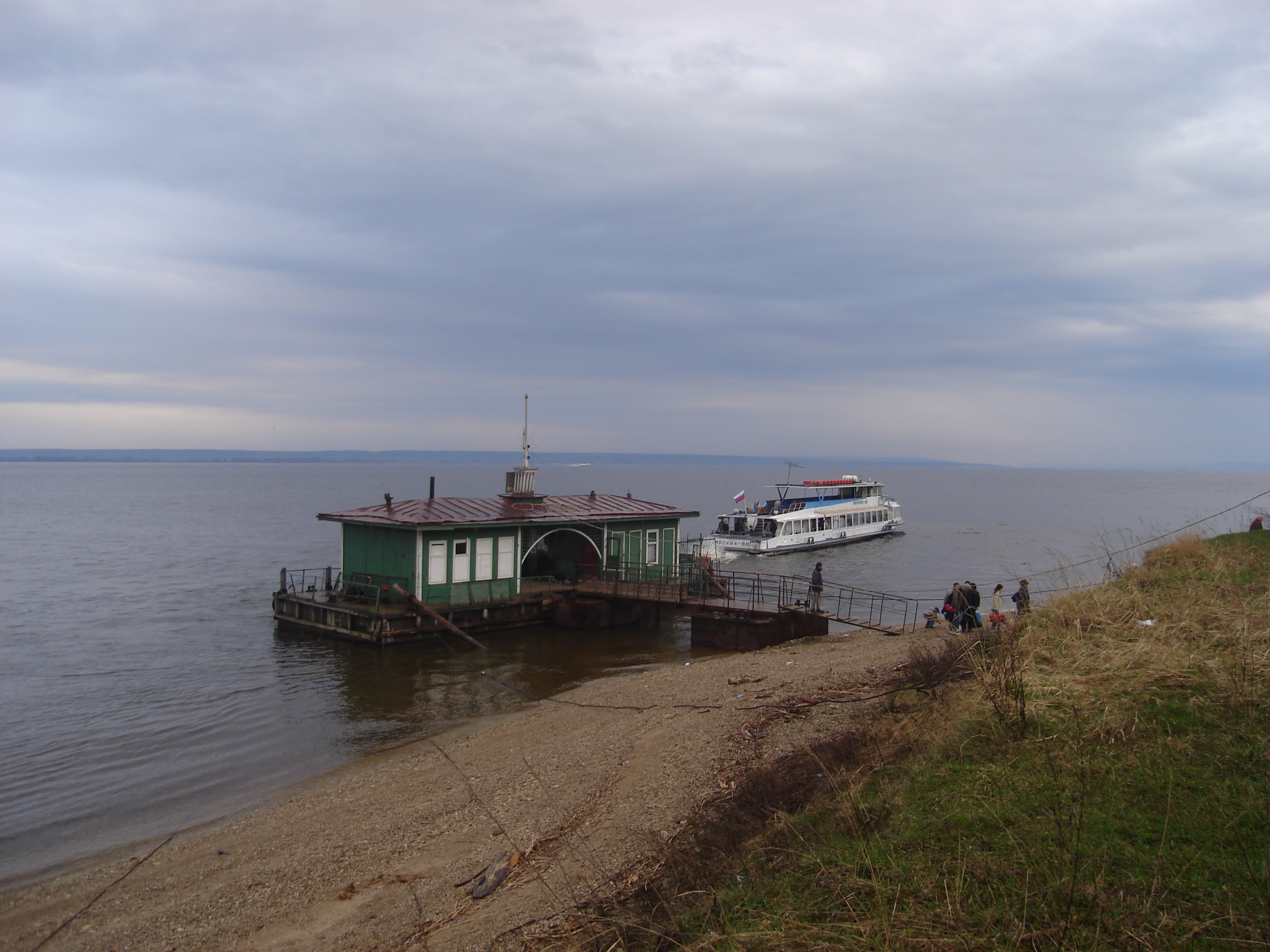
A wharfboat in Studenets at the Volga.

Studenets (Tatar and Russian: Студене́ц) is a rural locality (a village) in Verkhneuslonsky District of the Republic of Tatarstan, Russia, situated on the bank of the Kuybyshev Reservoir, five kilometers south of Verkhny Uslon, the district's administrative center. Population: 29 (2000); 49 (1989, all ethnic Russians). It is a dacha place for the inhabitants of the city of Kazan.

It was founded in the second half of the 17th century. In the 19th century, the majority of its residents were sailors.
