= Special economic zones of Russia =

The special economic zones of Russia are established by the Russian government to attract foreign direct investment. The privileges of special economic zones last for 49 years, and offer their residents a special legal status resulting in a number of tax and customs preferences.

Russia has eighteen federal special economic zones (SEZs) and several regional projects. Federal SEZs in Russia are regulated by Federal Law # 116 FZ issued on July 22, 2005.

There are MNCs among investors to Russia's SEZ, such as Yokohama, Cisco, Isuzu, Air Liquide, Bekaert, Rockwool and many others.

== History ==
Federal Law # 116 FZ was issued on July 22, 2005 to regulate SEZs.

Open joint-stock company OSJC "Special Economic Zones" was founded in 2006 to accumulate and implement world's best practices in developing and managing SEZ and promote Foreign direct investment (FDI) in the Russian economy. It is fully owned and funded by the Russian state. It managed fifteen to-be federal SEZs.

As of March 2010, Russia's federal SEZs host 207 investors from eighteen countries.

== List of SEZ ==
As of 2022, there are 45 special economic zones in Russia:

=== Industrial Production ===
- Alabuga Special Economic Zone
- Chuvashia
- Kaliningrad
- Kemerovo
- Kaluga
- Lipetsk
- Lyudinovo
- Pskov Moglino
- Sverdlovsk Titanium Valley
- Tver Zavidovo
- Togliatti
- Volgograd

=== Technology and development ===
- Dubna
- Innopolis Special Economic Zone (the city of Innopolis)
- St. Petersburg
- Tomsk
- Zelenograd

=== Tourist and recreational ===
- Altai Valley
- Irkutsk
- Baikal Haven
- Russky Island
- The Turquoise Katun

=== Logistics ===
- Murmansk
- Sovetskaya Gavan
- Ulyanovsk Vostochny

=== Ports ===
- Vladivostok
