= Bolshoe Podberezye =

Bolshoe Podberezye Большое Подберезье
- Rural locality

Other transcription(s)
- Interactive map of Bolshoe Podberezye
- Location of Bolshoe Podberezye Bolshoe Podberezye (Tatarstan)
- Coordinates: 55°22′00″N 47°59′00″E
- Country: Russia
- Federal subject: Tatarstan
- Elevation: 153 m (502 ft)
- Time zone: UTC+3 (MSK)
- Postal code: 422335
- OKTMO ID: 92629409101

Bolshoe Podberezye (Russian: Большое Подберезье; Tatar: Олы Подберезье, Olı Podberezye or Күлле ил, Külle il) is a village in Kaybitsky District, Republic of Tatarstan, Russia. It is the administrative center of Bolshepodberezinskoe municipal unit.

== Geography ==
Located on the river Birlya (left tributary of Sviyaga), 18 km south-west of the regional center - Bolshiye Kaybitsy.

== History ==
The village is founded in the second half of 16th century. It was a center of Podberzye district in 1944–56.

== Population ==
- 1989 – 860
- 1997 – 878
- 2010 – 730

== Ethic composition ==
- In the year of 2002: Russians – 93%, Tatars – 4%, Chuvash people – 3%
- In the year of 2010: Russians – 92%, Tatars – 4%, Chuvash people – 3%, there are also Tajiks and Azerbaijanis.

== Infrastructure ==
Middle school founded in 1836 People connected with the village In this village Andrey Koshkin, a Hero of the Soviet Union.
