= Studenets =

Studenets may refer to:

- Studenets, Razgrad Province, a village in Loznitsa Municipality, Bulgaria
- Studenets, Smolyan Province, a village in Chepelare Municipality, Bulgaria
- Studenets, Russia, name of several rural localities in Russia
