= Sulitsa =

Location
- Country: Tatarstan, Russia

Physical characteristics
- Source
  - location: Maydan, Verkhneuslonsky District, Volga Upland
- Mouth: Sviyaga
  - location: Kuybyshev Reservoir near Sviyazhsk
  - coordinates: 55°43′59″N 48°42′25″E
  - elevation: 53 m (174 ft)
- Length: 47 km (29 mi)
- Basin size: 517 km^{2} (200 sq mi)

Basin features
- Progression: Sviyaga→ Volga→ Caspian Sea

The Sulitsa (Russian: Сули́ца, Tatar: Сөлчә) is a river in Tatarstan, Russian Federation, a right-bank tributary of the Sviyaga. It is 47 kilometres (29 mi) long, and its drainage basin covers 517 square kilometres (200 mi^{2}). It begins 3 kilometres (1.9 mi) west of Maydan village of the Verkhneuslonsky District and flows to the Kuybyshev Reservoir south of Sviyazhsk. Major tributaries are the Changara, Mamatkozino, and Klyancheyka. The maximal mineralization 500–700 mg/L. The average sediment deposition at the river mouth per year is 113 millimetres (4.4 in). Drainage is regulated. Since 1978 it has been protected as a natural monument of Tatarstan.
