= Shaykhutdinov =

Shaykhutdinov (Russian: Шайхутдинов, Tatar: Шәйхутдинов) or Shaikhutdinova (Russian: Шайхутдинова, Tatar: Шәйхутдинова) is a Russian surname of Tatar origin. Notable people with this surname include:

- Rifat Shaykhutdinov (born 1963), Russian politician
- Roman Shaykhutdinov (born 1974), Russian politician
- Vladimir Shaykhutdinov (born 2004), Russian footballer
