= Markiz Island =

Landform of Tatarstan

Coordinates: 55°46′14″N 49°02′28″E

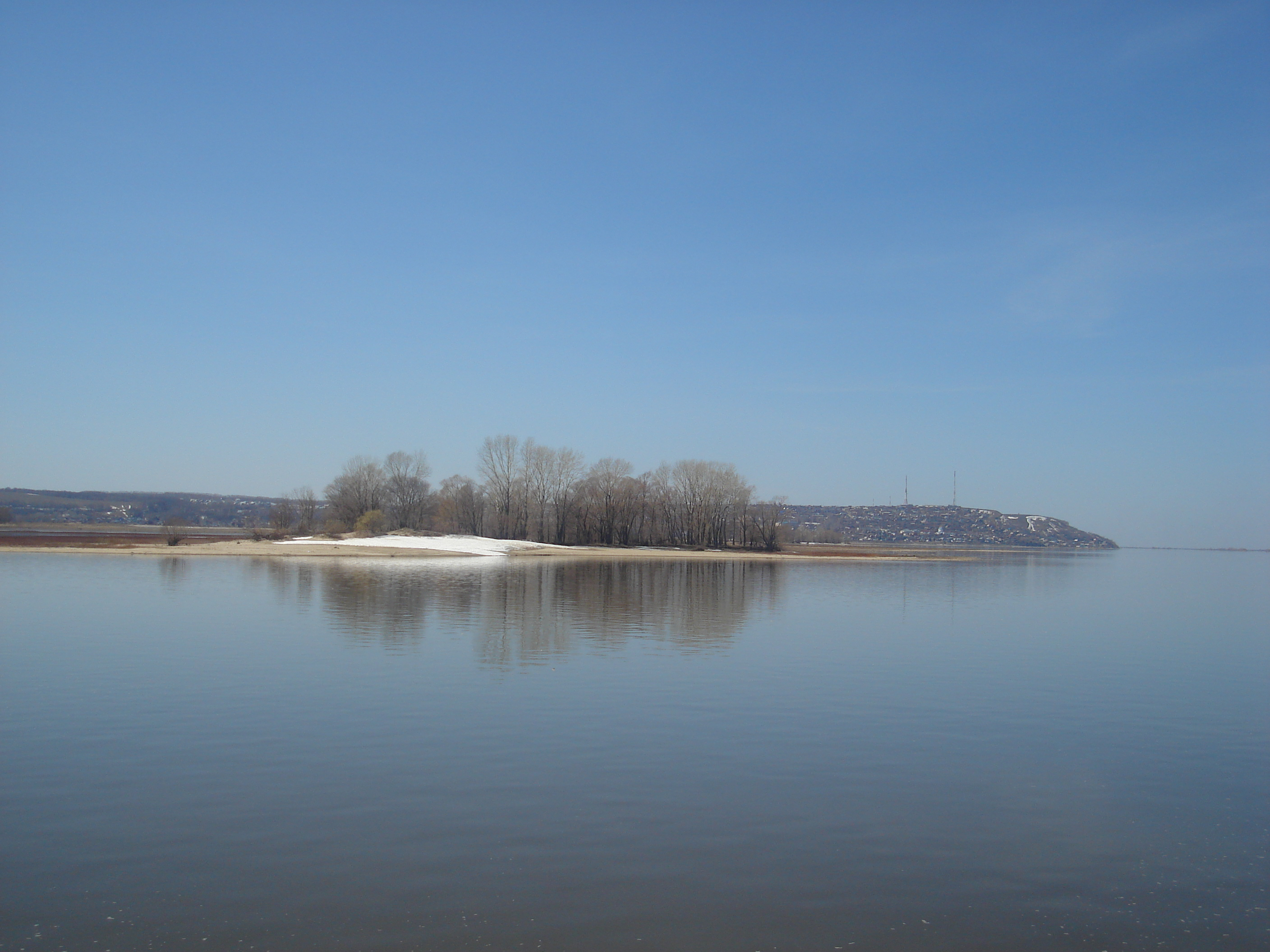
View of Markiz Island

The Markiz Island (Russian: Маркиз; Tatar: Маркиз утравы, romanized: Markiz utrawı) is a small island in the Kuybyshev Reservoir of the Volga River near Kazan, Tatarstan, Russia. The island, as well as the neighboring Uslon Islands, were formed in 1956-58 when the reservoir was filled from the larger island, also named Markiz.

The original Markiz was a favorite recreation place for the Kazan inhabitants in the first half of the 20th century. The beach and the rest center on the island existed until the original island was drowned in the reservoir. There was a ferryboat line that connected the island with Kazan.

As of 2012, the island is uninhabited and does not have any standing structures.
