= Kubnya =

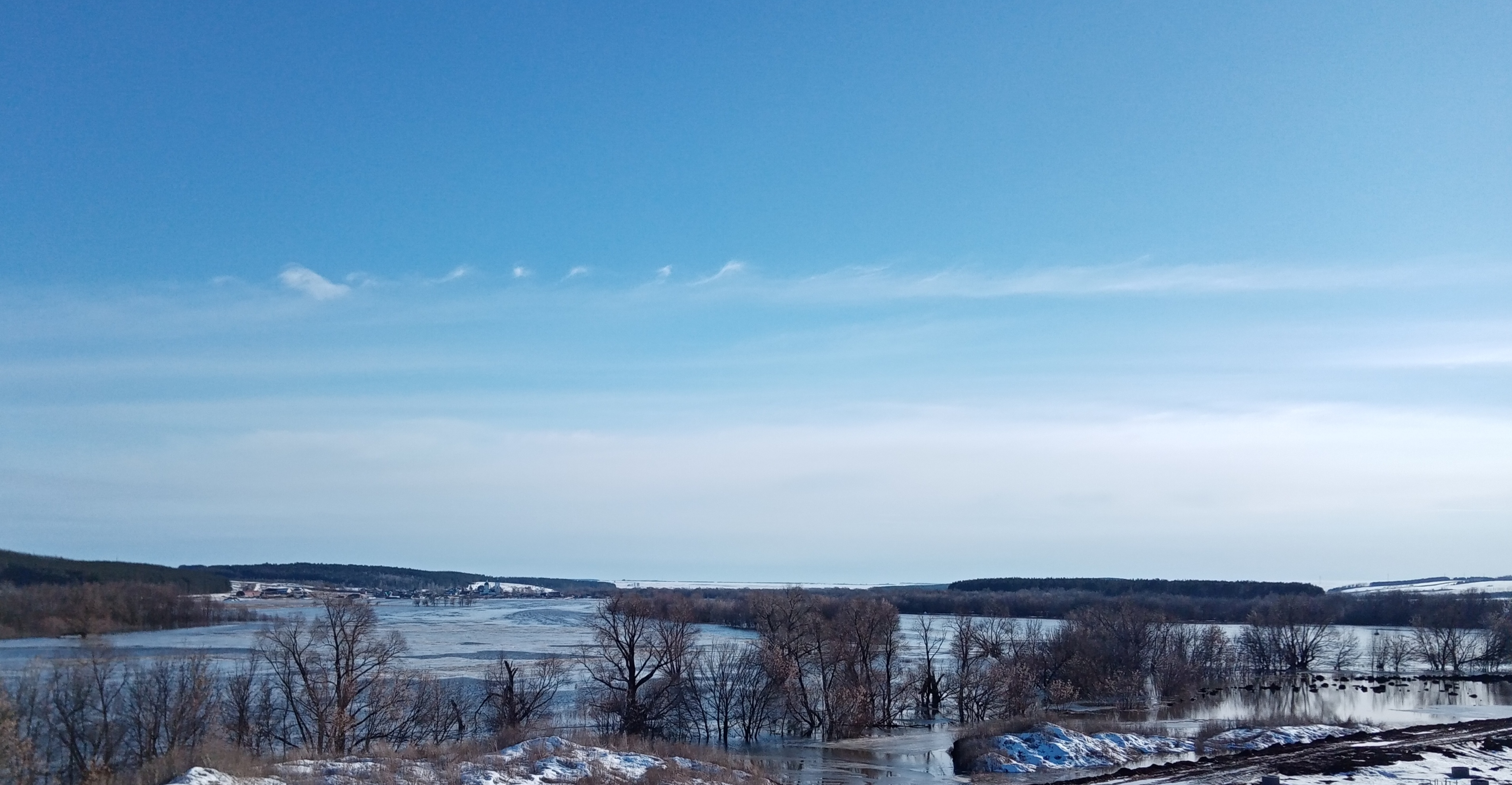

Location
- Country: Chuvash Republic and Tatarstan, Russia

Physical characteristics
- Source
  - location: Chuvash Republic
- Mouth: Sviyaga
  - location: near Burunduki, Tatarstan
  - coordinates: 55.5344°N 48.4286°E
- Length: 176 km (109 mi)
- Basin size: 2,480 km^{2} (960 sq mi)

Basin features
- Progression: Sviyaga→ Volga→ Caspian Sea

The Kubnya (Russian: Кубня; Chuvash: Кĕтне; Tatar: Гөбенә) is a river in Chuvashia and Tatarstan, Russian Federation, a left-bank tributary of the Sviyaga. It is 176 kilometres (109 mi) long, of which 121 kilometres (75 mi) are in Tatarstan, and its drainage basin covers 2,480 square kilometres (960 mi^{2}). It begins in Chuvashia and flows to the Sviyaga 4 kilometres (2.5 mi) south of Burunduki.

A major tributary is the Uryum. The maximal mineralization is 500–800 mg/L. The average sediment deposition at the river mouth per year is 92 millimetres (3.6 in). The maximal water discharge is 420 cubic metres per second (15,000 cu ft/s). Drainage is regulated. Since 1978 it is protected as a natural monument of Tatarstan.
