= Bula (river) =

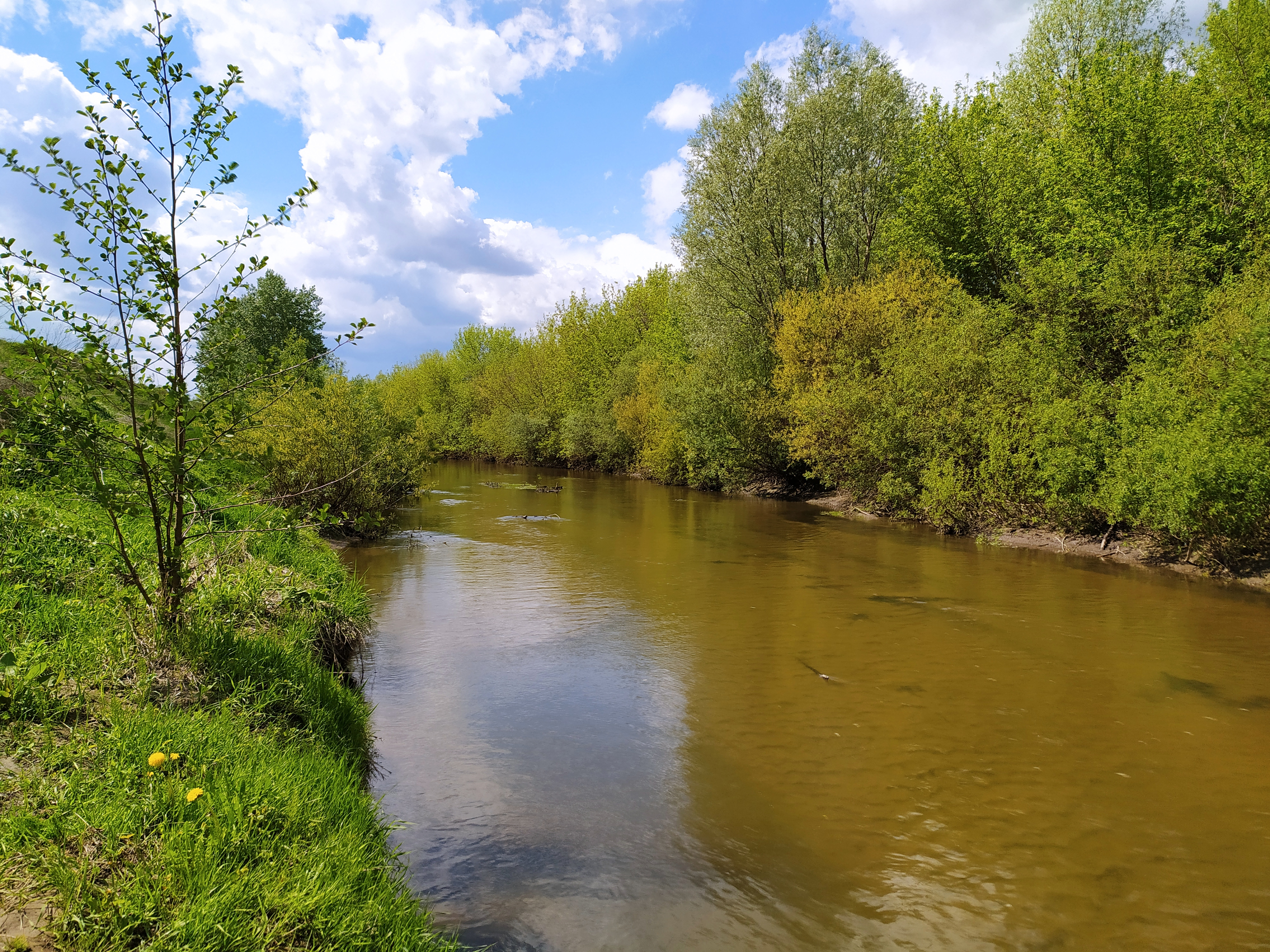
- The river and its mouth

Location
- Country: Russia
- Federal District: Volga

Physical characteristics
- Source
  - location: Batyrevsky District
  - coordinates: 55.07900°N 47.07751°E
- Mouth: Sviyaga
  - location: Apastovsky District
  - coordinates: 55.20544°N 48.38649°E
- Length: 118 km (73 mi)
- Basin size: 1,580 km^{2} (610 mi^{2})
- Discharge
  - location: near Chatbash (as of 1979)
  - maximum: 490 m^{3}/s (17,000 cu ft/s)

Basin features
- Progression: Sviyaga→ Volga→ Caspian Sea

The Bula (Russian: Була; Chuvash: Пăла, Păla; Tatar: Бола) is a river in the Chuvash Republic and the Republic of Tatarstan, Russia, a left-bank tributary of the Sviyaga. Its length is 118 kilometres (73 mi) and its drainage basin is 1,580 square kilometres (610 mi^{2}). It originates in the Chuvash Republic and falls into the Sviyaga River south of Devlikeyevo.

Major tributaries are the Cheremshan and the Malaya Bula. The maximum mineralization is 700–1000 mg/L. Batyrevo, the administrative center of Batyrevsky District of the Chuvash Republic, is located on the river.
