= Innopolis Special Economic Zone =

Special economic zone "Innopolis"
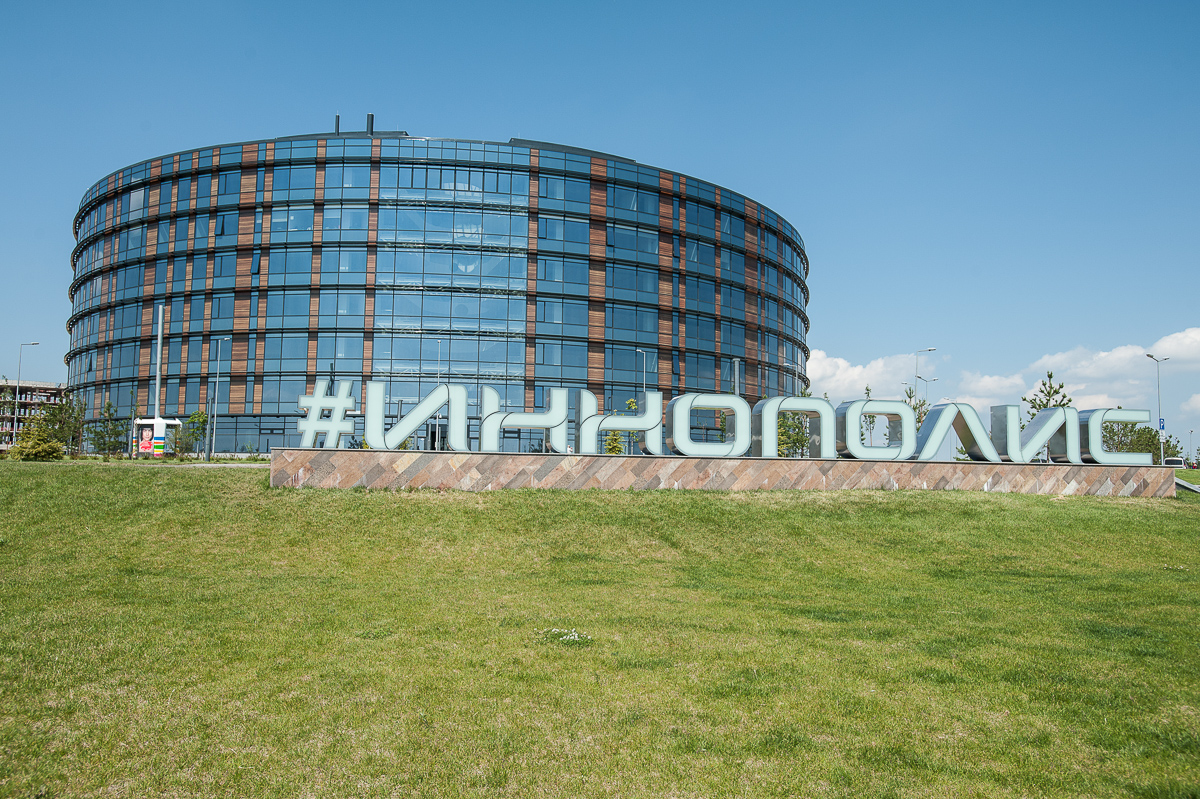
- Type: Joint-stock company
- Founded: November 1, 2012; 14 years ago
- Headquarters: Russia
- Area served: The Republic of Tatarstan, Verkhneuslonsky and Laishevsky districts
- Website: https://sezinnopolis.ru/en/

SEZ “Innopolis” (Russian: Иннополис) is a high tech innovation hub located in the city of Innopolis in the Republic of Tatarstan. The Innopolis zone also bears the designation of a special economic zone (SEZ). On November 1, 2012 the Government of the Russian Federation issued a decree creating special territories to attract investment and develop the IT-industry in the region. A special economic zone provides its residents and partners with tax and customs benefits, insurance premiums, rental incentives and a number of other preferences.

The SEZ is located in the Verkhneuslonsky and Laishevsky municipal districts and occupies a total area of 311 hectares. As of 2020, 109 companies were residents of the Innopolis SEZ, with 26 of them participating as partners, and another 50 as startups. These companies have provided jobs for 3.8 thousand people and invested about 27 billion rubles into the economy of Tatarstan.

== History ==
=== Special economic zones in the Russian Federation ===
Special economic zones (SEZs) are territories endowed with special legal status in the Russian Federation that provide advantageous economic conditions for their residents and partners. SEZs are designed to attract direct investment as well as foster entrepreneurship and development in the region. Investors in such zones receive tax and customs benefits, rental incentives, special infrastructure and other opportunities. Foreign residents are able to take advantage of simplified regulatory procedures related to investment, administration and business operations. As of 2020, there were 33 special economic zones in Russia, seven of which are technology innovation zones. According to the Ministry of Economic Development of the Russian Federation, the latter contribute to the development of “innovative activities for the creation and distribution of scientific and technical products and their industrial application.” Russian tech innovation SEZs are usually located in research and educational centers and are designed to promote innovative industries.

=== Innopolis ===
On November 1, 2012, the Government of Russia adopted Resolution No. 1131 on the creation of the SEZ “Innopolis” with a total area of 311 hectares within the Verkhneuslonsky and Laishevsky districts of Tatarstan. This SEZ became the fifth technology innovation zone in Russia and the second special economic zone in Tatarstan after the establishment of “Alabuga”. At the end of 2017, shares of both “Alabuga” and “Innopolis” worth about 32 billion rubles were transferred to right-to-use arrangements to the government of the Republic of Tatarstan. In 2019, the territory of Innopolis was removed from the jurisdiction of the Ministry of Digital Development to the control of the Minister of Economy of Tatarstan, a decision that, according to the government of the republic, will contribute to the “acceleration of institutional development.” In practice the Innopolis economic zone is managed by its general director Renat Khalimov and the local administration. Particularly important decisions are considered by the Board of Directors chaired by the President of the Republic of Tatarstan Rustam Minnikhanov.

== Economics ==
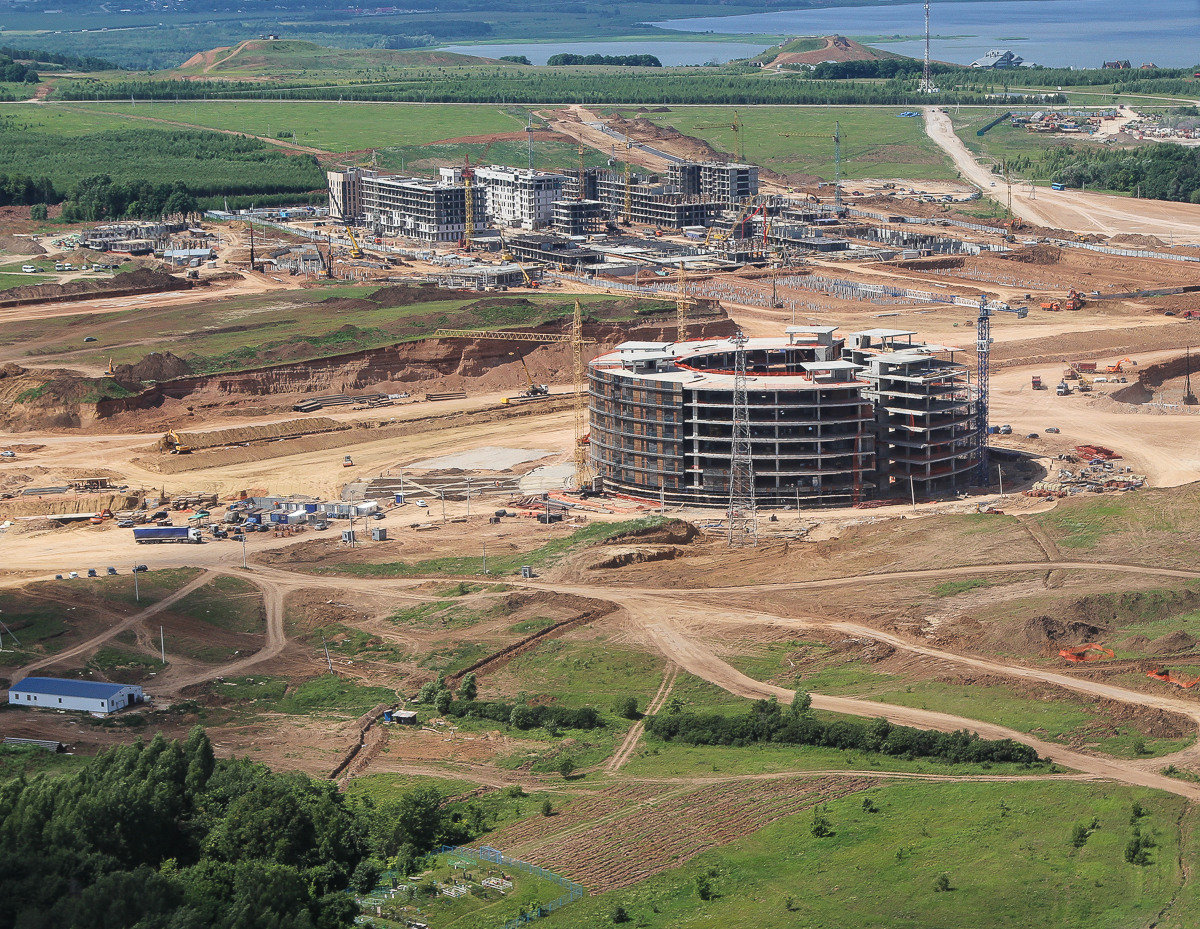
Innopolis under construction, year 2014

=== Tax procedures and benefits ===
The SEZ "Innopolis" was established as a locus of entrepreneurial activity in order to attract financial and intellectual resources to the IT-industry. Innopolis investors and residents receive special preferential tax and duty treatment. The SEZ applies a special customs regime without the import and export rates. From January 2020 until 2023, residents can pay taxes under simplified tax schedules of 1% of total income or 5% from the “income minus expenses” option. The SEZ administration believes that the reduced tax rate will attract investment in small and medium-sized business projects in the IT sector. Since the end of 2019, 39 new startups with ready-made projects have been accepted by Innopolis. Over the next ten years, Innopolis is expected to attract a hundred new residents and 380 small and medium-sized businesses. The 2020 preferential package offers residents a free coworking space, their own office in a technopark, and preferential rental housing. Additionally, Innopolis offers a free business acceleration program, free mobile internet and a one-year subscription to online entertainment services.

In the summer of 2012, an office of SEZ “Innopolis” was opened in California to attract investors as well as to help Russian entrepreneurs gain access to international business infrastructure and recruit foreign specialists under special conditions. Currently, students and instructors from 37 countries live in Innopolis.

In August 2020, the President of the Republic of Tatarstan Rustam Minnikhanov and General Director of Russian Post Maxim Akimov signed an agreement on creating Russia's first free economic zone for cross-border Internet commerce in Innopolis. By November, the company plans to build a new bonded warehouse and create a hub to accelerate international mail transport between Europe and Asia.

=== Partners and residents ===
As of 2020, 109 companies in the zone have the status of resident and 26 more are partners of the Innopolis SEZ. These include Acronis, Cognitive Technologies, Schneider Electric, MTS, Yandex, Gazprom Neft, Alfa-Bank, Sberbank, Tinkoff Bank, Magnit IT Lab and others. According to reports, residents and partners have provided more than 3.8 jobs in Innopolis. In November 2020, nine companies became new residents and partners of the Innopolis SEZ and were expected to create more than 250 new jobs. By this time the overall level of announced investment in IT-Industry through the project had reached a record level amounting to 43 billion rubles.

== Infrastructure services ==
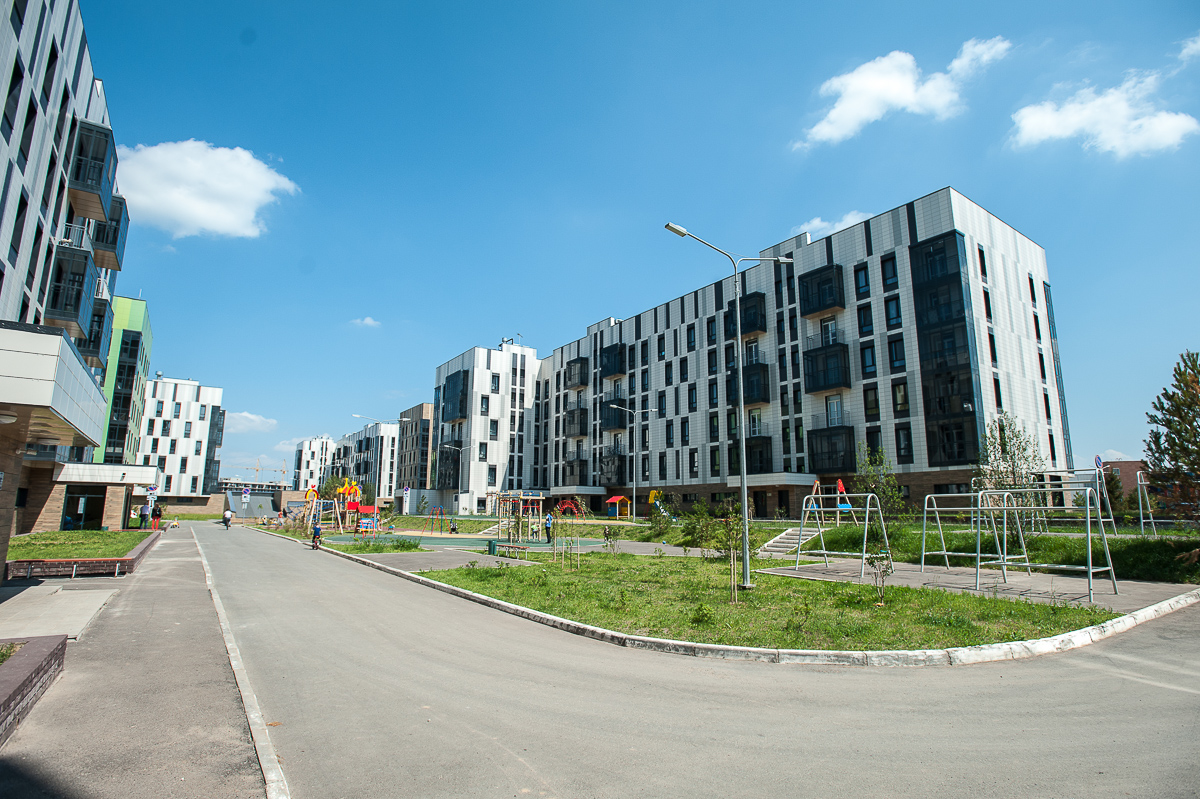
Residential area of Innopolis, year 2016

The Innopolis economic zone consists of two sites located in the Verkhneuslonsky and Laishevsky districts. The main site with a total area of 192 hectares is located in downtown Innopolis and accommodates the offices of IT companies and laboratory facilities. The second site of 118 hectares is allocated for manufacturing and is located not far from the Kazan international airport. Additionally, the SEZ has an “IT Specialist Recruitment Center founded by the Innopolis City Hall, which helps residents to monitor the job market and recruit personnel in the region.

We have identified for ourselves two so-called “magnets” that will attract IT companies to Innopolis — a SEZ, which provides companies with significant tax preferences, and an international IT university that will train highly qualified personnel.

— Roman Shaikhutdinov, Vice Prime Minister of Tatarstan and Minister of Informatization and Communications

Innopolis has integrated representatives from local government as well as a developing social and recreational infrastructure for its employees and guests. As of 2020, the city had a kindergarten, a school, an IT lyceum for 153 students, a sports complex, a medical center, post offices and banks, supermarkets, bars, cafes, restaurants and other facilities. In August 2020, a cultural center ArtSpace with an area of 2.2 thousand square meters was opened in Innopolis and the President of the Republic Rustam Minnikhanov attended its opening ceremony.

The Innopolis University is the main educational project of the SEZ. The university annually trains over 800 bachelors, masters and postgraduate students in IT and robotics. According to the Prime Minister of Tatarstan Roman Shaykhutdinov, most graduates from the university work in the SEZ and in the university faculty.

=== Technology parks ===
The SEZ infrastructure includes a multifunctional technology park named after Alexander Popov with offices, development centers and conference halls. As of 2020, the technology park with a total area of 40 thousand square meters provided workplaces for more than 1,500 employees. In 2016 the administration of Innopolis decided to build a second working space. This new technology park named after Nikolai Lobachevsky is designed to support an additional 1,500 employees and is scheduled for completion in 2021.

=== Transport ===
The city of Innopolis is 40 km away from Kazan and constitutes a part of its urban agglomeration. Transport accessibility is ensured by a network of roads that is part of the federal highway M7, the proximity of river transport (Sviyazhsk) and the presence of helipads. Innopolis is located 60 km from the Kazan International Airport and 33 km from the main railway station. In 2020, there were two bus routes circulating between Kazan and Innopolis.

In 2018, Innopolis became the first city in Europe to launch unmanned Yandex taxis. Five test stations are located near main destinations like: the university, the stadium, the medical center, the Zion residential complex and the technology park. As of 2020, six unmanned vehicles were running in the city daily, with average ride times of 7–10 minutes. In August 2020, the Prime Minister of Tatarstan, Roman Shaykhutdinov, announced the joint plans of the Innopolis University and Kamaz to launch an unmanned heavy truck.

=== Engineering infrastructure ===
Heat is supplied to Innopolis from an automatic boiler house with a capacity of 32 MW built in 2015. Due to the lack of its own water resources, water supplied to the city is taken from the Volga. To ensure a regular water supply to the SEZ, new treatment facilities and pumping stations were built in a short timespan of three months. In August 2013, the first section of a 3.29 km gas pipeline was launched in Innopolis. Two years later, Gazprom Transgaz Kazan completed the construction of a branch of the Kazan-Gorky gas trunk line to Innopolis. In 2016, Megafon installed fiber-optic communication links in the SEZ providing a connection at a speed of up to 10 Gbit/s.

=== Housing ===
According to official statistics, more than 5,000 people visit the Innopolis economic zone every day, of which 3,781 live there permanently. At the end of 2019, the housing stock in the city consisted of 22 residential buildings with 1,572 apartments available for rent. For residents, 21 townhouses with a total area of more than 16 thousand square meters have also been built. In 2017, the Innopolis administration announced plans to build commercial housing for sale. In March 2020, four developer companies expressed their interest in investing in the commercial housing and urban infrastructure of Innopolis.

== Awards and achievements ==
In 2018, the Innopolis SEZ received an award for the federal Special Economic Zones in the category of the Social Environment for the development of the region's business ecosystem. In 2019 and 2020, the economic zone was included in the fDi Magazine’s Global Free Zones of the Year 2019 Awards receiving several nominations at once. The SEZ “Innopolis” is also a member of the World Free Zones Organization and a member of the Association for the Development of Clusters and Technology Parks of Russia.

== Bibliography ==
- Yusupov, T. Z.; Sagdieva, R. R. (2015). "Pravovoe regulirovanie investitsii v osobye ekonomicheskie zony v Rossii: nalogovye i inye preferentcii na primere Respubliki Tatarstan [Legal regulation of investments in special economic zones in Russia: tax and other preferences on the example of the Republic of Tatarstan]". Voprosy sovremennoi iurisprudentcii. 7–8 (48): 81–86.
