= Birlya =

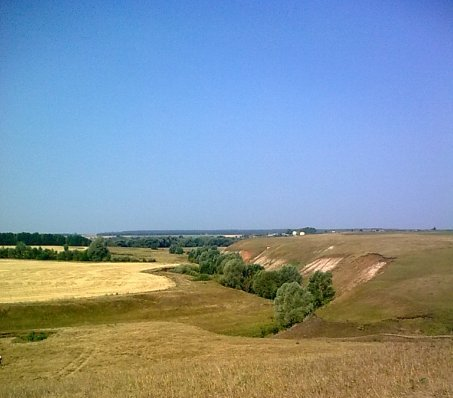
- Etymology: Tatar or Finno-Ugric
- Native name: Бирля (Russian)

Location
- Country: Russia
- Region: Republic of Tatarstan

Physical characteristics
- Source
  - coordinates: 55.3202°N 47.9557°E
- Mouth: Sviyaga
  - coordinates: 55.5182°N 48.4494°E
- Length: 48 km (30 mi)
- Basin size: 385 km^{2} (149 sq mi)

Basin features
- Progression: Sviyaga→ Volga→ Caspian Sea

The Birlya (Russian: Бирля; Tatar: Бәрле), a tributary of the Sviyaga, is a river in the Republic of Tatarstan in Russia. The name has its origin from the Tatar language words bure and ile which mean "the river on the place of wolves" or Finno-Ugric languages word hop. There is information that Cheremisa people (Mari people) used to raise hop.

== Geography ==
The Birlya is 48 kilometres (30 mi) long, and its drainage basin covers 385 square kilometres (149 mi^{2}). The Birlya begins south of a village Bolshoe Podberezye, 3 km away. It flows into the Sviyaga, north of the village Burunduki. This river is 5–8 metres (16–26 ft) wide. As for hydrology, it is a low river. Flow distribution is irregular.

== Practical use ==
This river is used by locals for daily living needs, as a drinking place of a nowt. It has been recognized as natural landmark since 10 January 1978.
