= Sviyaga =

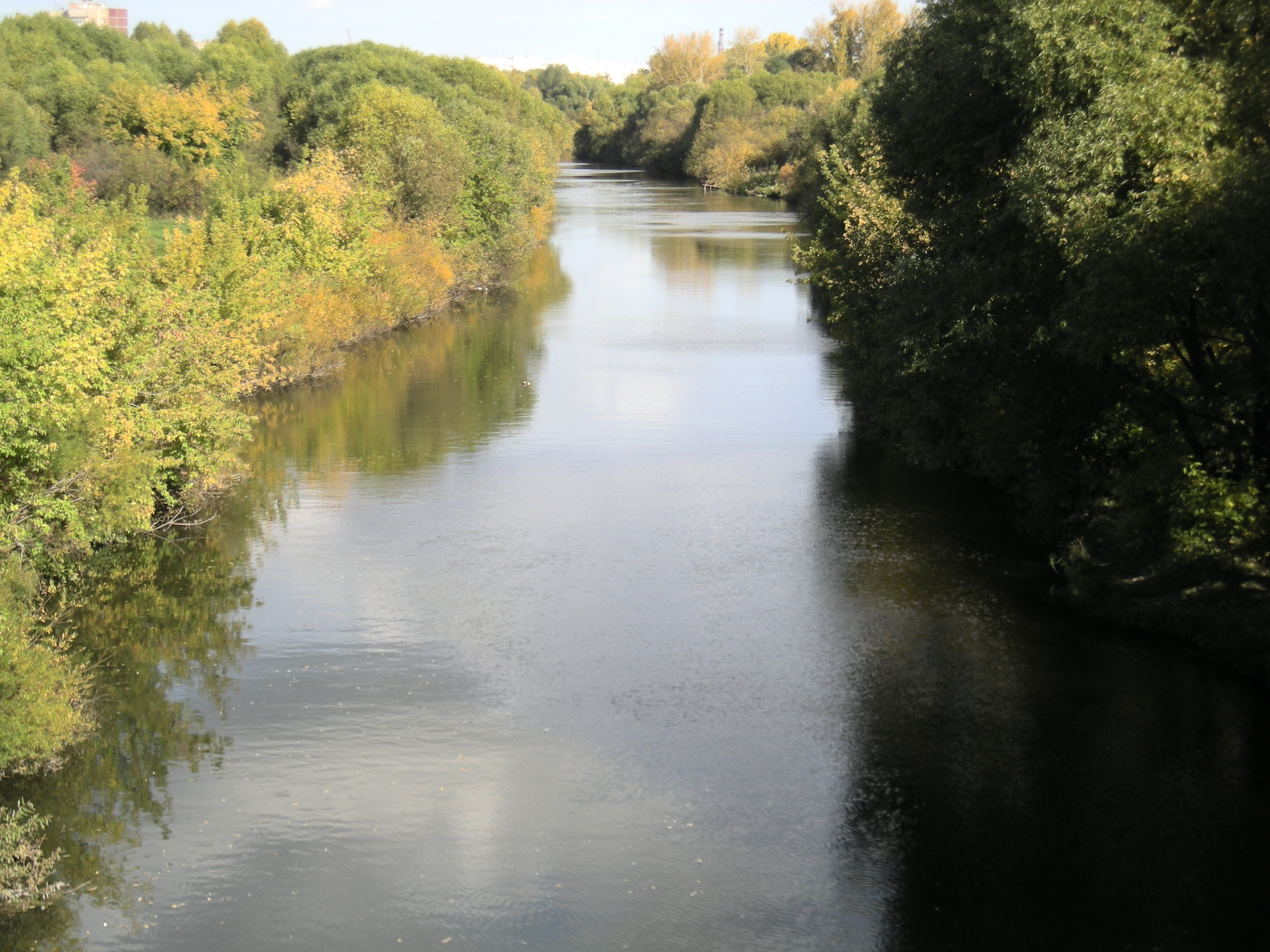
- Sviyaga River at Ulyanovsk

Location
- Country: Russia

Physical characteristics
- Source
  - location: Ulyanovsk Oblast
  - elevation: 100 m (330 ft)
- Mouth: Volga
  - location: Kuybyshev Reservoir
  - coordinates: 55°43′52″N 48°36′57″E
  - elevation: 53 m (174 ft)
- Length: 375 km (233 mi)
- Basin size: 16,700 km^{2} (6,400 sq mi)
- Discharge
  - average: 1,590 m^{3}/s (56,000 cu ft/s) (near mouth)

Basin features
- Progression: Volga→ Caspian Sea

The Sviyaga (Russian: Свияга; Tatar: Зөя; Chuvash: Сĕве) is a river in the Ulyanovsk Oblast and Tatarstan, a right tributary of the Volga. It is 375 kilometres (233 mi) long, and its drainage basin covers 16,700 square kilometres (6,400 mi^{2}). The Sviyaga flows into the Sviyaga Cove of the Kuybyshev Reservoir, west of Kazan. It freezes up in November or December and stays icebound until April or May. Major tributaries are the Arya, Birlya, Bula, Karla, Kubnya, Sulitsa and Tosha rivers.

The city of Ulyanovsk is along the Sviyaga. In Ulyanovsk, the Sviyaga flows only a few kilometres away from the Volga, but their eventual confluence happens much further downstream, about 200 kilometres (120 mi) north of Ulyanovsk.

The castle of Sviyazhsk, which dates to 1551, is on the island in Sviyaga Cove of the Kuybyshev Reservoir.
