= Studenets, Vologda Oblast =

Studenets Студенец
- Village
- Location within Vologda Oblast Location within Russia
- Coordinates: 58°46′N 40°15′E
- Country: Russia
- Region: Vologda Oblast
- District: Gryazovetsky District
- Time zone: UTC+3:00

Studenets (Russian: Студенец) is a rural locality (a village) in Rostilovskoye Rural Settlement, Gryazovetsky District, Vologda Oblast, Russia. The population was 20 as of 2002.

== Geography ==
Studenets is located 13 km south of Gryazovets (the district's administrative centre) by road. Bolshoye Kosikovo is the nearest rural locality.
