= Roman Shaykhutdinov =

Deputy Prime Minister of the Republic of Tatarstan (born 1974)

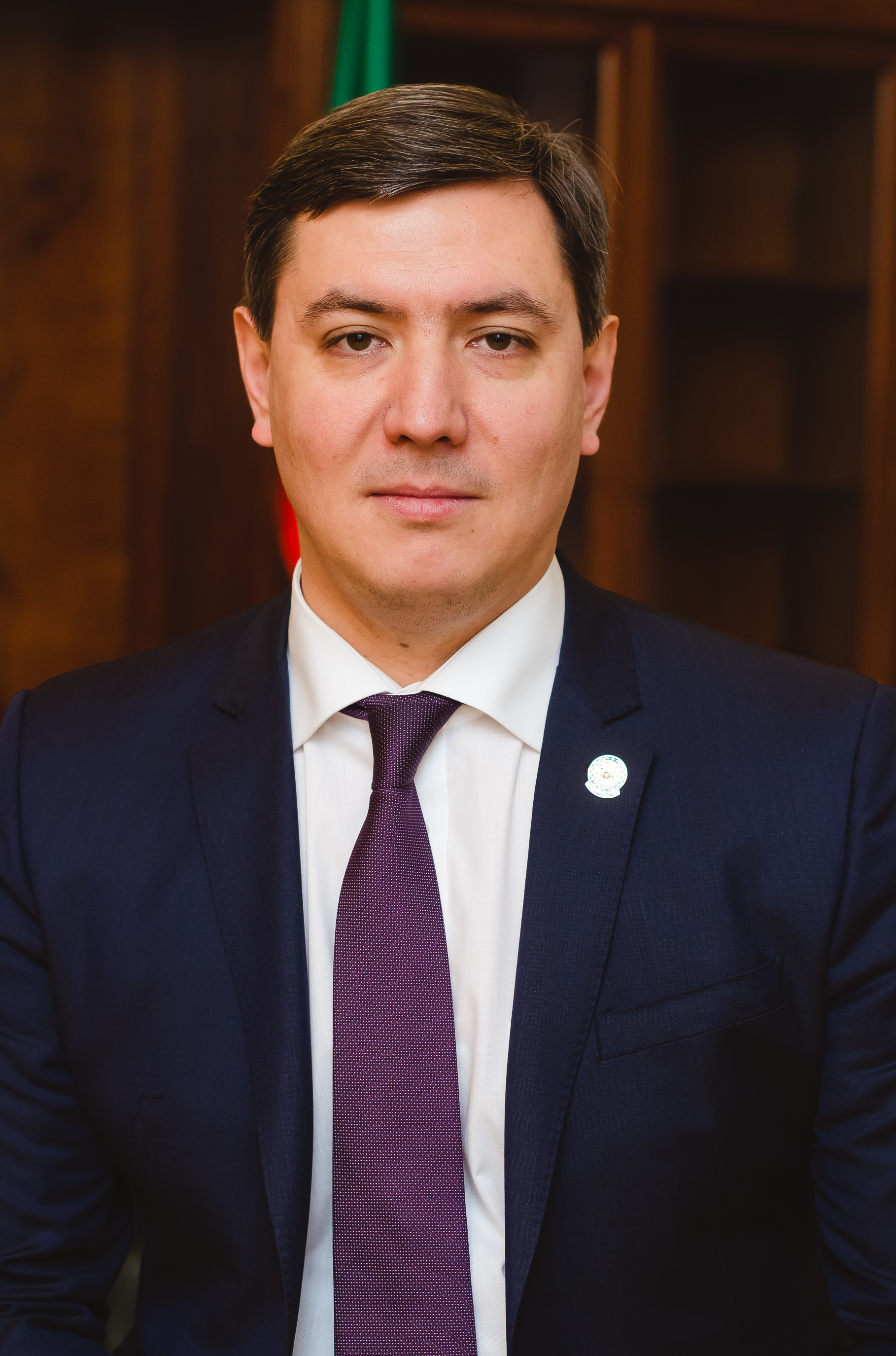

Deputy Prime Minister of the Republic of Tatarstan
- Incumbent
- Assumed office May 28, 2012
- Preceded by: Nikolai Nikiforov

Personal details
- Born: Kazan, Russia
- Education: Jurisprudence
- Alma mater: Kazan State University
- Known for: moving Tatarstan regional & municipal executive government agency portals under CC BY
- Website: prav.tatarstan.ru/zamestitel-premer-ministra-4.htm

Roman Shaykhutdinov (Russian: Рома́н Алекса́ндрович Шайхутди́нов; born 28 August 1974) is a Deputy Prime Minister of the Republic of Tatarstan, responsible for development of Innopolis.

== Early life and education ==
Roman Shaykhutdinov was born on August 28, 1974 in Kazan, Russia. He is graduated from the Kazan State University named after V.I.Ulyanov-Lenin major in “Jurisprudence” (1996), finished postgraduate study of the Legal faculty of the Kazan State University named after V.I.Ulyanov-Lenin major in “Jurisprudence” (2000), advanced training at the Russian Presidential Academy of National Economy and Public Administration on the supplementary professional program "Management skill: development of regional teams" (2016). In 2017 have been trained in the joint program of Moscow School of Management SKOLKOVO and Kazan (Volga) Federal University "Model of management of strategic projects of the Republic of Tatarstan". In 2018 he passed professional retraining in the Russian Presidential Academy of National Economy and Public Administration under the program "Executive Master in Public Management". Speaks English.

Married, with three children.

== Career ==
1995 – 1997 – Specialist of I class of the Legal department of the RT Ministry of external economic relations

1997 – 1998 – Chief specialist of the Legal department of the RT Ministry of finance

1998 – 2000 – Chief of the Legal department of OOO “Teleset”

2000 – 2002 – Director general of OOO “Networks of telecommunication companies” (Moscow)

2002 – 2011 – Director general of OOO "Teleset"

2006 — 2011 – Chief operations officer of Teleset Networks

2006 — 2011 – Director general of OAO “TNKPO”

July 2011 – May 2012 – Director of branch of OAO Rostelecom in the Republic of Tatarstan

May 2012 – June 2019 – Deputy Prime Minister of the Republic of Tatarstan - Minister of informatization and communications of the Republic of Tatarstan

From June 2019 – Deputy Prime Minister of the Republic of Tatarstan

== Personal life ==
Shaykhutdinov is married and has three children.

== Honours and awards ==
- Awarded with the Honorary diploma of RT Ministry of communications (2003)
- Laureate of the Russian contest "Manager of the Year" (2004)
- Winner of the contest of RT Ministry of communications "Best manager in the industry - 2004" in nomination "By rates of growth of installed wire capacity"
- The nominee of competition of the Republic of Tatarstan "the Head of the year" (2005)
- Medal “In memory of 1000th anniversary of Kazan” (2005)
- Honorary title of the RF Ministry of communications “Master of communication” (2010)
- Medal of the order "For merits before Fatherland" II degree (14 Jan 2014)
- Medal "For strengthening of state information security system" (2014)
- Commemorative medal "The XXII Olympic winter games and XI Paralympic winter games of 2014 in Sochi"
- Commemorative medal "20 years of social partnership in the communications industry" "For active participation in trade Union activities and the fruitful cooperation with the Union in the framework of the partnership"
- Gratitude of the President of the Republic of Tatarstan for his great contribution to preparation and holding in Kazan XVI championship in water sports 2015 and XVI championship in water sports in the category "masters"
- Commemorative medal "The XVI world championship in water sports 2015 in Kazan"
- Gratitude of the President of the Republic of Tatarstan for his active participation in the implementation of projects to promote a positive image of the Republic of Tatarstan in the Russian Federation (2016)
- Gratitude of the Minister of communications and mass media of the Russian Federation "For contribution to successful elections of the President of the Russian Federation on March 18, 2018, in terms of ensuring the smooth operation of the communication infrastructure used for the operation of the gas "Elections", video broadcasts of voting procedures and the implementation of mobile voter opportunities (2018)
- Letter of appreciation from the Federal state unitary enterprise "Post of Russia" for assistance in the construction of the logistics post center in Kazan (2018)
- Honorary title "Honored worker of Informatization and communication industry of the Republic of Tatarstan" (2018).
