= Innopolis =

Town in the Republic of Tatarstan, Russia

Innopolis Иннополис
- Town

Other transcription(s)
  - Tatar: Иннополис
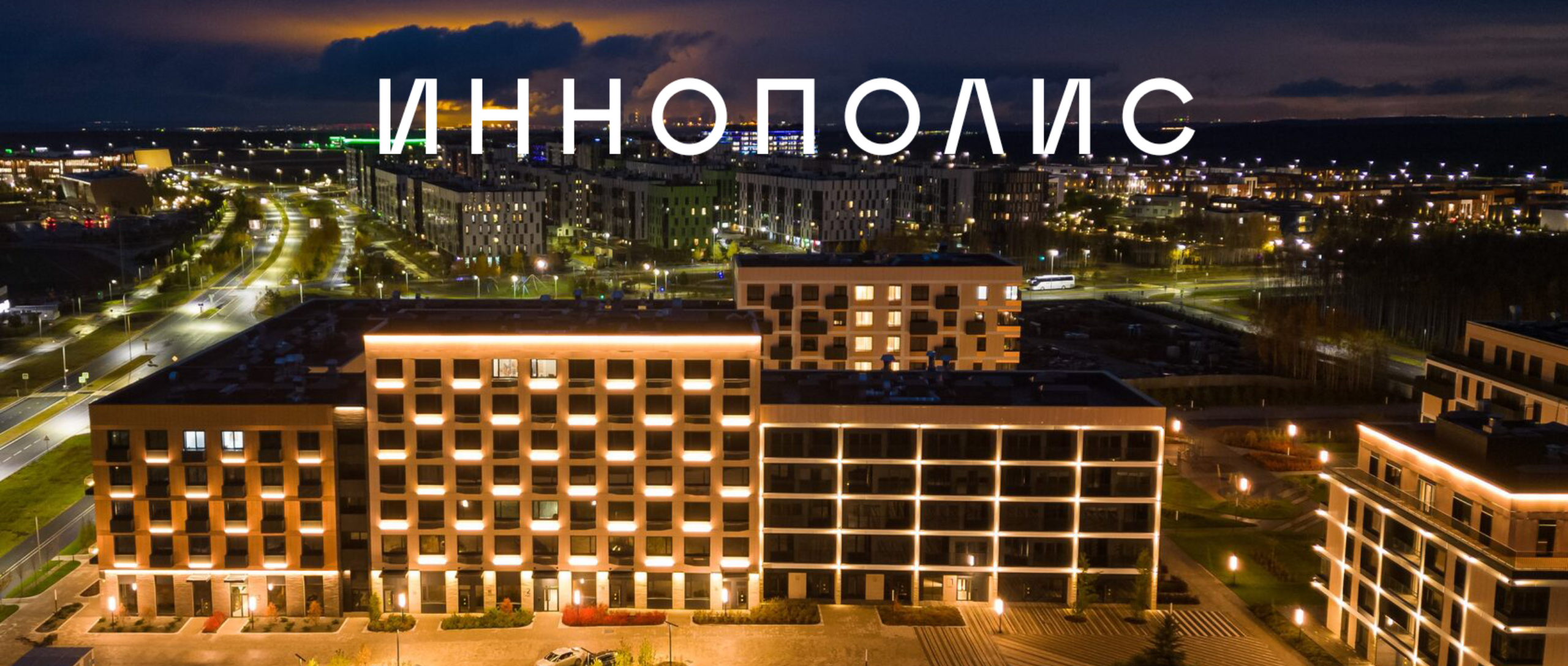
- A.S. Popov technology park in Innopolis, 2015
- Interactive map of Innopolis
- Location of Innopolis Innopolis (Tatarstan)
- Coordinates: 55°44′N 48°44′E
- Country: Russia
- Federal subject: Tatarstan
- Administrative district: Verkhneuslonsky District
- Founded: December 24, 2012
- Town status since: December 16, 2014

Government
  - Mayor: Ruslan R. Shagaleev

Population
  - Estimate (2024): 4,451 )

Municipal status
  - Municipal district: Verkhneuslonsky Municipal District
  - Urban settlement: Innopolis Urban Settlement
  - Capital of: Innopolis Urban Settlement
- Time zone: UTC+3 (MSK)
- Postal code: 420500
- OKTMO ID: 92620109001
- Website: innopolis.ru

Innopolis (Russian: Иннопо́лис; Tatar: Иннополис) is an urban settlement in Verkhneuslonsky District of the Republic of Tatarstan, Russia, a satellite of Kazan, the capital of the republic.

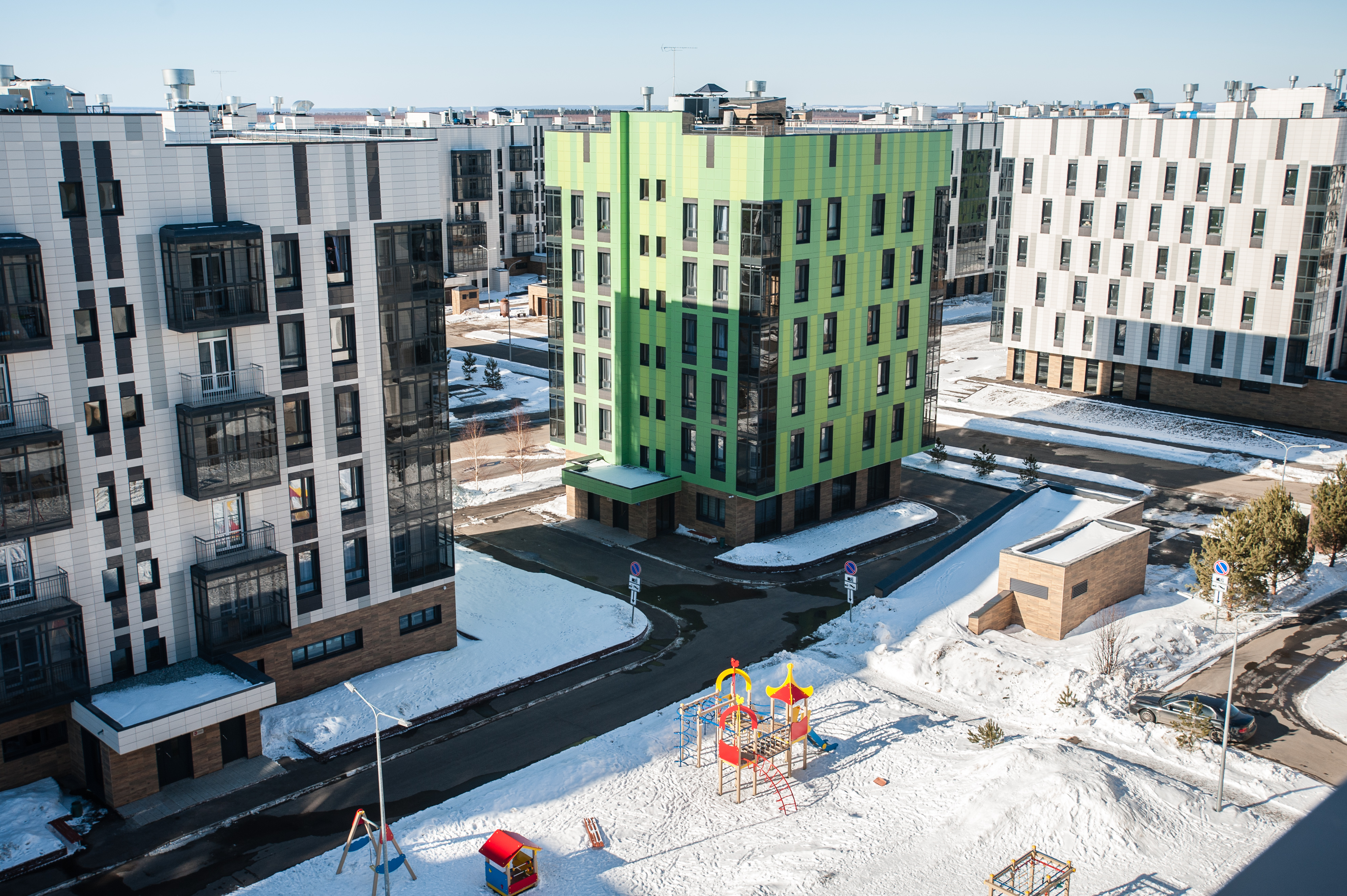
Residential area, 2016

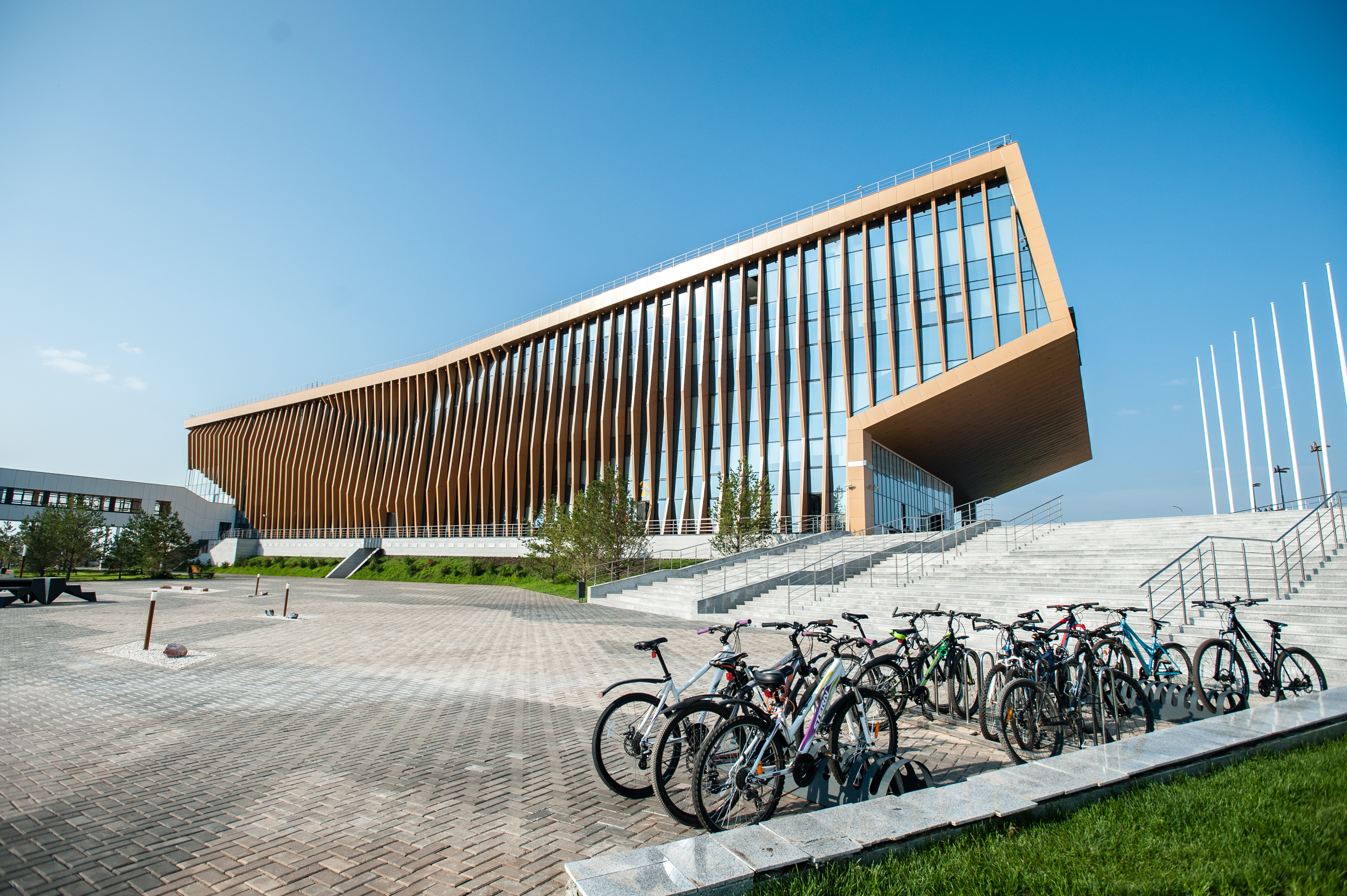
The main building of the University of Innopolis, 2016

Innopolis was established on December 24, 2012 as a technology park ("IT Village"). The change of the status from village to urban was granted to it on December 16, 2014.

Within the framework of administrative divisions, the town of Innopolis is subordinated to Verkhneuslonsky District. As a municipal division, Innopolis is incorporated within Verkhneuslonsky Municipal District as Innopolis Urban Settlement.

== See also ==
- Innopolis Special Economic Zone
- Innopolis University
