= Kuybyshev Reservoir =

Large hydroelectric reservoir in western Russia

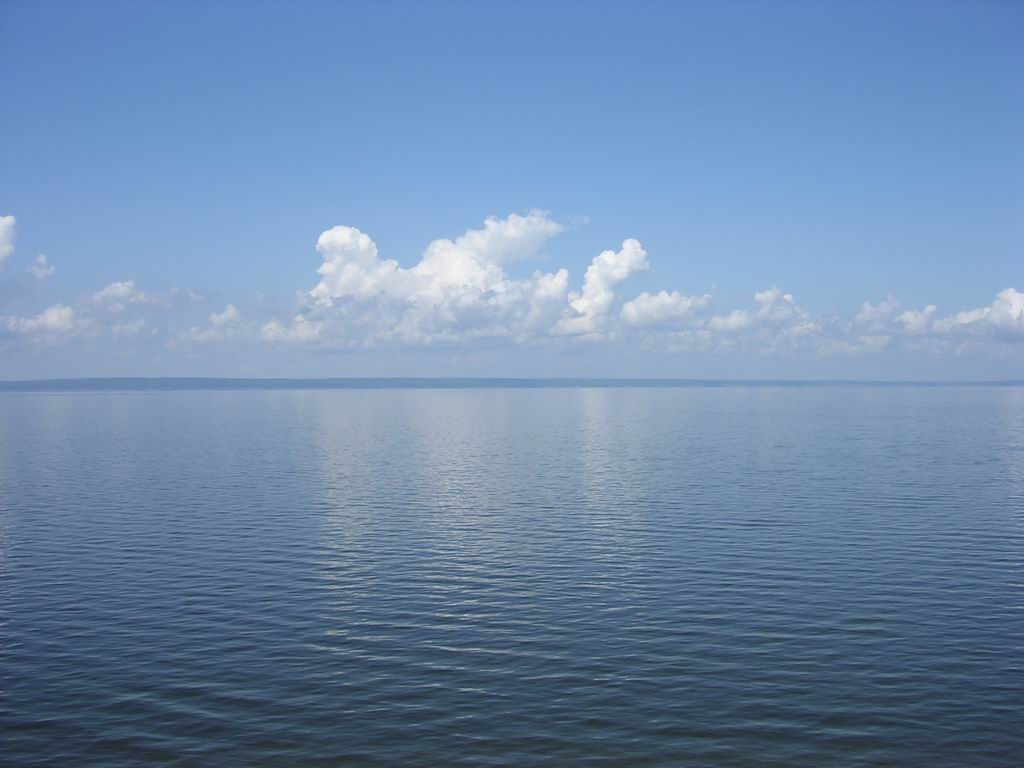
- near Ulyanovsk

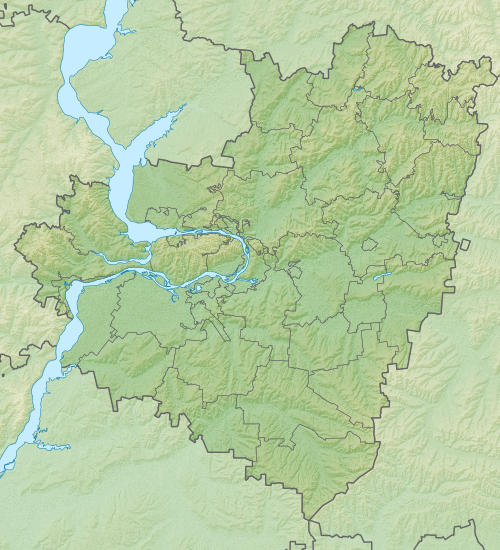
- Location within Samara Oblast
- Coordinates: 53°46′38″N 48°55′46″E
- Lake type: Hydroelectric reservoir
- Primary inflows: Volga, Kama, Sviyaga, Kazanka, Bolshoy Cheremshan
- Primary outflows: Volga
- Basin countries: Russia
- Max. length: over 500 km (310 mi)
- Max. width: 35 km (22 mi)
- Surface area: 6,450 km^{2} (2,490 sq mi)
- Average depth: 8 m (26 ft)
- Max. depth: 41 m (135 ft)
- Water volume: 57.3 km^{3} (13.7 cu mi)
- Shore length^{1}: 2,604 km (1,618 mi)
- Surface elevation: 53 m (174 ft)
- Islands: Sviyazhsk
- Settlements: Kazan; Ulyanovsk; Tolyatti; Zelenodolsk; Volzhsk; Bolghar; Tetushi; Novoulyanovsk; Chistopol; Laishevo
- ^{1} Shore length is not a well-defined measure.

Kuybyshev Reservoir or Kuybyshevskoye Reservoir (Russian: Куйбышевское водохранилище, romanized: Kuybyshevskoye vodokhranilishche) is a reservoir of the middle Volga and lower Kama in Chuvashia, Mari El Republic, Republic of Tatarstan, Samara Oblast and Ulyanovsk Oblast, Russia. It is sometimes called as Samara Reservoir and informally called Kuybyshev Sea. The Kuybyshev Reservoir has a surface area of 6,450 km² and a volume of 58 billion cubic meters. It is the largest reservoir in Europe and third in the world by surface area. The major cities of Kazan, Ulyanovsk, and Tolyatti are adjacent to the reservoir.

The reservoir was created by the dam of Zhiguli Hydroelectric Station (formerly, V.I. Lenin Volga Hydroelectric Station), located between the cities of Zhigulevsk and Tolyatti in Samara Oblast. It was filled in 1955–1957.

With the filling of the reservoir in the 1950s, some villages and towns were submerged by the rising water and were rebuilt on higher ground. These included the old fortress town of Stavropol-on-Volga, which was replaced by Tolyatti. One district of Ulyanovsk is below water level and is protected from the reservoir by an embankment.

The reservoir serves as a critical "hotspot" for monitoring biological invasions in the Volga-Kama basin. Due to its transit location along the northern (Caspian-Volga-Baltic) invasive corridor, it acts as a major aggregation zone where a high diversity of alien fish species accumulates before potentially transitioning further into the Kama River ecosystem.

== Paleontology ==
In 1926, a fossilized tooth of Ptychodus latissimus paucisulcata was found in redeposited sediments of Tunguz sand spit, which was later flooded by the waters of the reservoir.

== Gallery ==
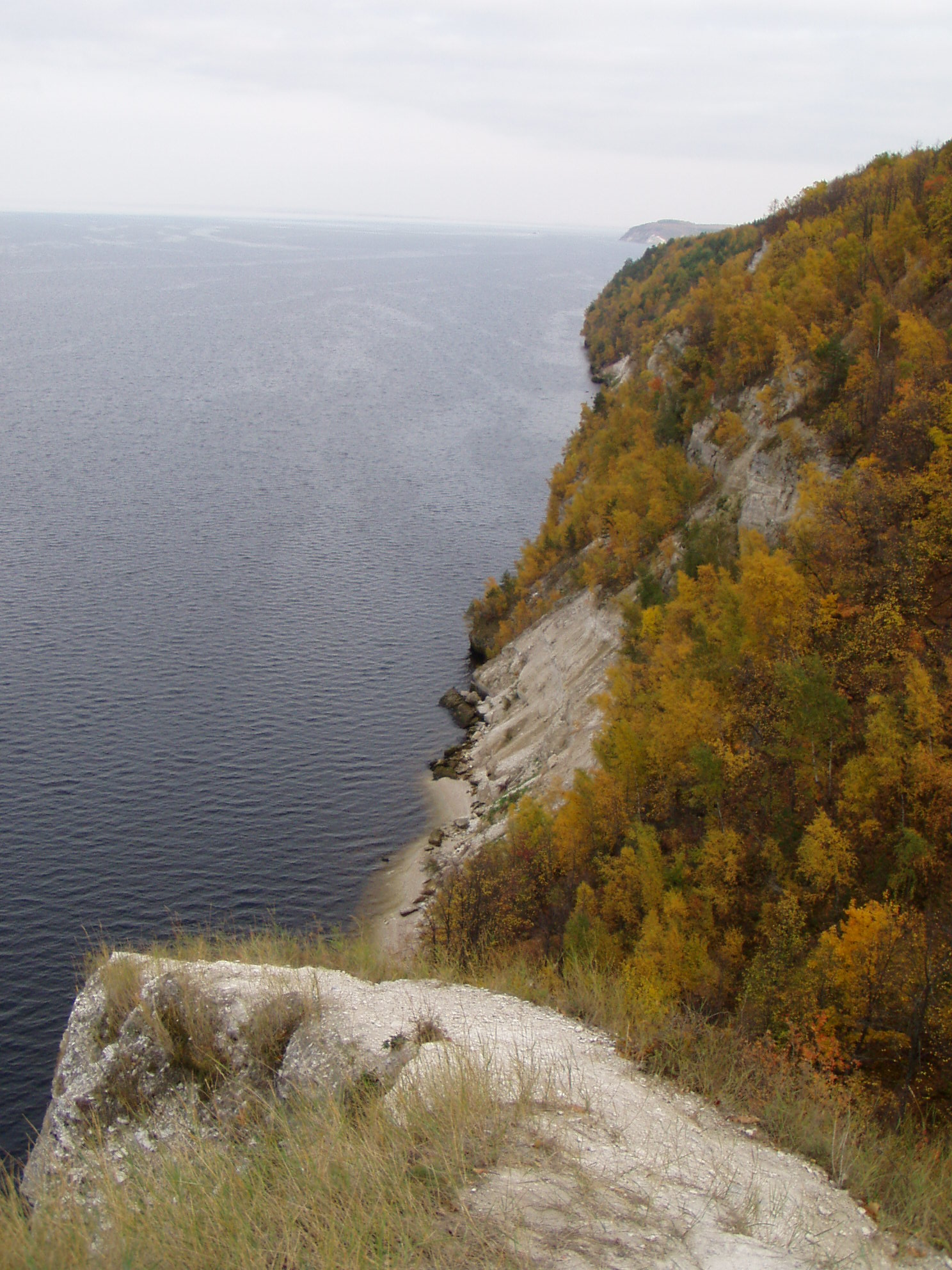
Mountainous right bank of the reservoir

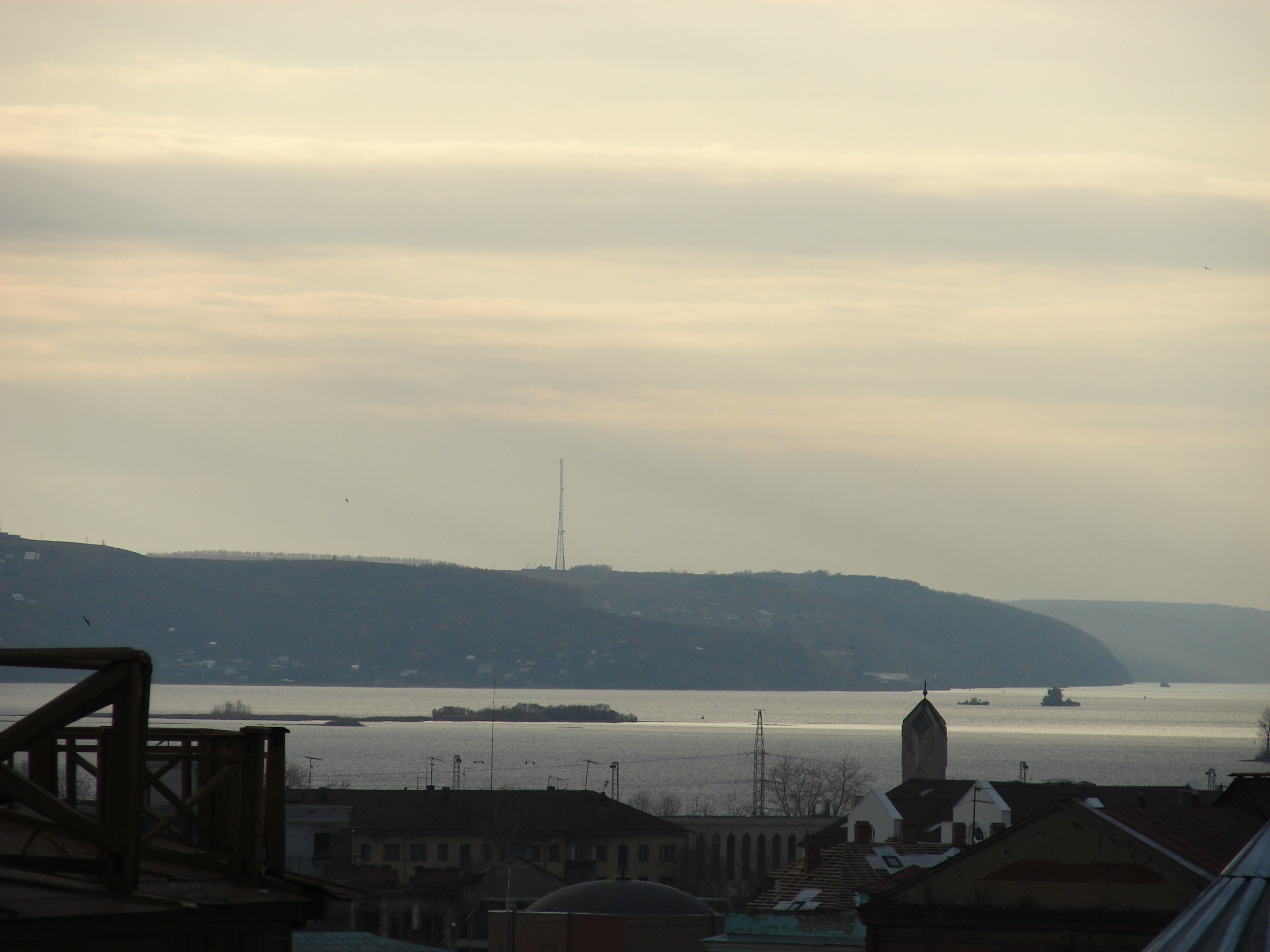
Kuybyshev Sea near Kazan

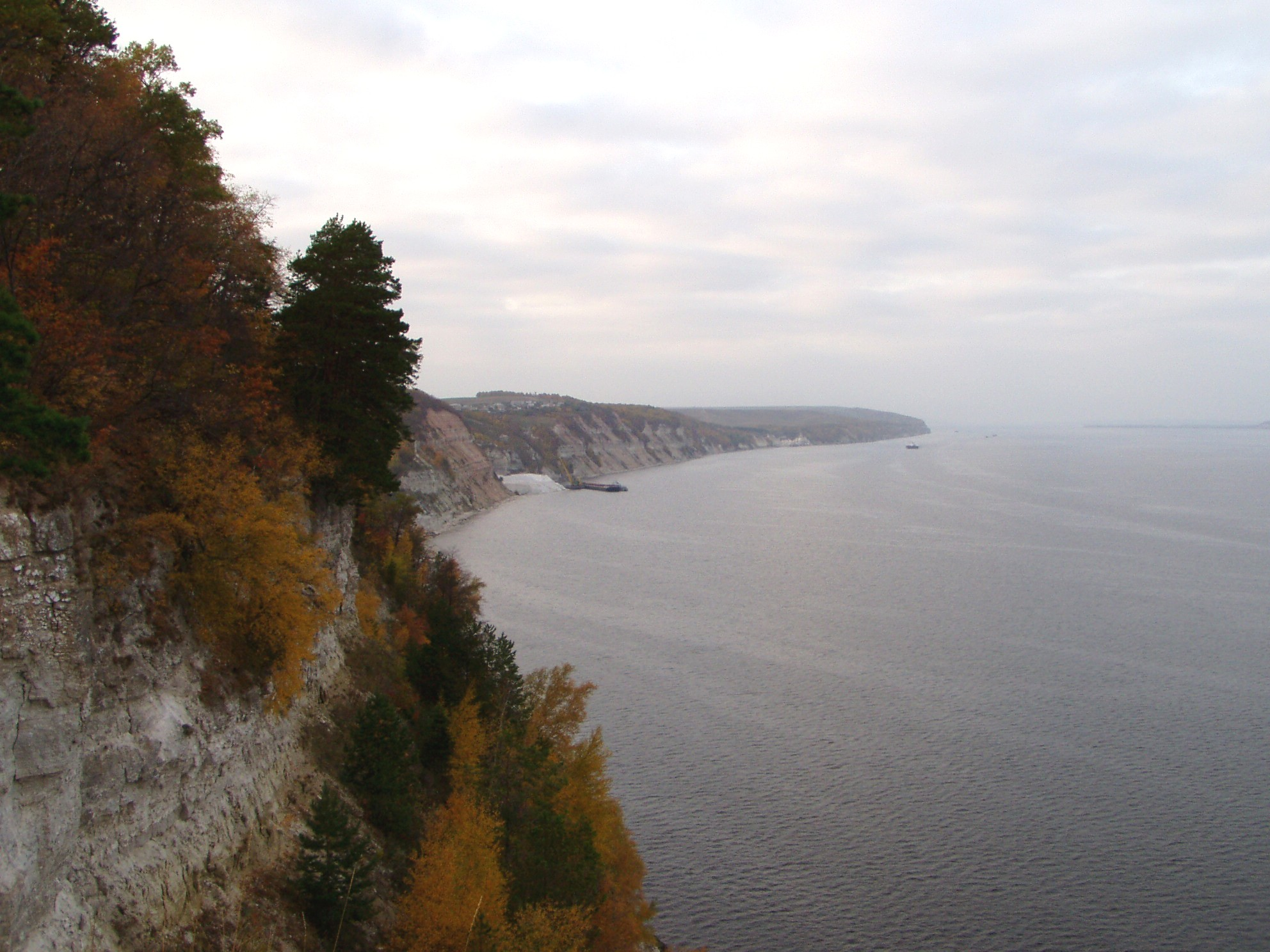
Rocks and gypsum mine near the Kama's mouth

== See also ==
- Markiz Island
