= Innopolis University =

University in Innopolis, Tatarstan, Russia

- Университет Иннополис
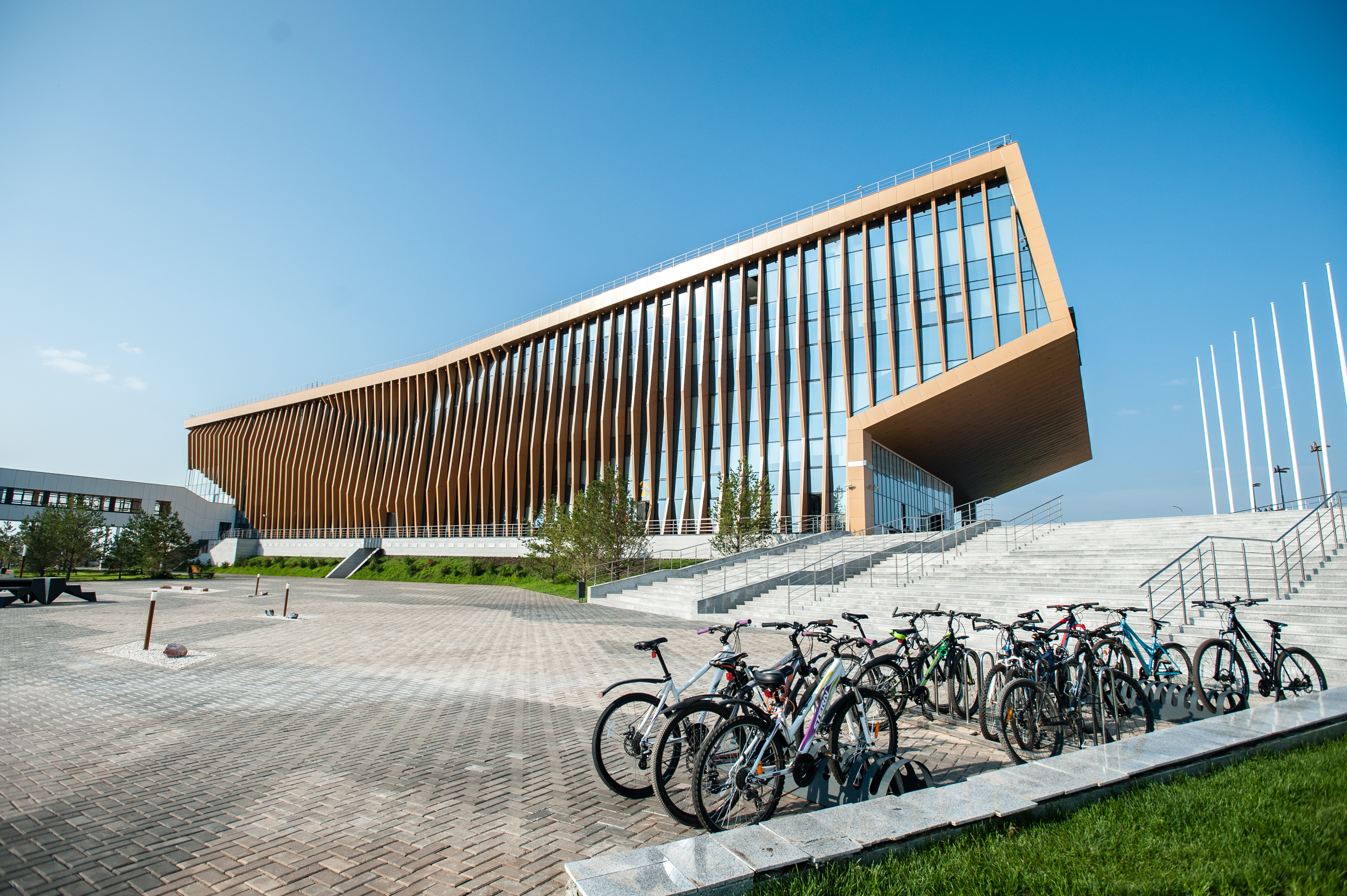
- Main building of Innopolis University
- Established: 10 December 2012; 13 years ago
- Academic staff: 152 (2026)
- Students: 1860 (2026)
- Location: 1 Universitetskaya Street, Innopolis, Tatarstan, 420500, Russia; 55°45′12″N 48°44′36″E
- Language: English, Russian
- Website: university.innopolis.ru
- Location within Tatarstan Location within Russia

Innopolis University (Russian: Университет Иннополис) is a private university located in the city of Innopolis, Tatarstan, Russia. The university was established on 10 December 2012 and specializes in information technology and robotics, as well as the development of information technology both internationally and in Russia.

Construction of the university began on 9 June 2012; its first bachelor program opened in 2014. By the same year, partner universities included Carnegie Mellon University and the National University of Singapore. Innopolis University would sign academic agreements with the University of Bonn, Innsbruck University, Harbour.Space University and the Sapienza University of Rome in 2016. On 26 April 2019, ownership of the university was transferred to the Ministry of Digital Development, Communications and Mass Media.

As of 2026, Innopolis University offered 6 bachelor's degree programs, as well as 10 master's degree programs in Computer Science, Engineering, Artificial Intelligence and Robotics and 1 PhD rogram; facilities at the university include 7 residential buildings with 2–5 person apartments, 27 lecture rooms, 2390 square meters library area, swimming pool, football ground, tennis courts and sports center. The university also operates 10 scientific centres and 21 science laboratories, which are divided into 5 institutes. Innopolis University holds partnership with 450 industrial IT companies.

Students of Innopolis University obtain cutting-edge education and take on independent research projects in IT and robotics. At the end of studies students implement an industrial project, which is counted as their graduation work.

== See also ==
- Innopolis Special Economic Zone
