= Tenkovsky District =

Former district of the Tatar ASSR

Tenkovsky District (Russian: Теньковский район; Tatar: Тәмте районы) was a district (raion) of the Tatar ASSR.

It had a population of 23,504 (1939), an area of about 806 square kilometers and was divided into 20 selsoviets in 1947.

It was established on February 14, 1927, and was abolished on October 20, 1931, being merged with neighbouring Sviyazhsky District into Verkhneuslonsky District. It was re-established on February 10, 1935, on the parts of territory of Verkhneuslonsky, Kamsko-Ustyinsky and Apastovsky districts. Its administrative center was the village (selo) of Tenki. On July 16, 1958, the district was abolished and its territory was transferred to Verkhneuslonsky and Kamsko-Ustyinsky districts.
