= Verkhny Uslon =

Rural locality in Yuğarı Oslan District, Tatarstan

Coordinates: 55°46′05″N 48°58′43″E

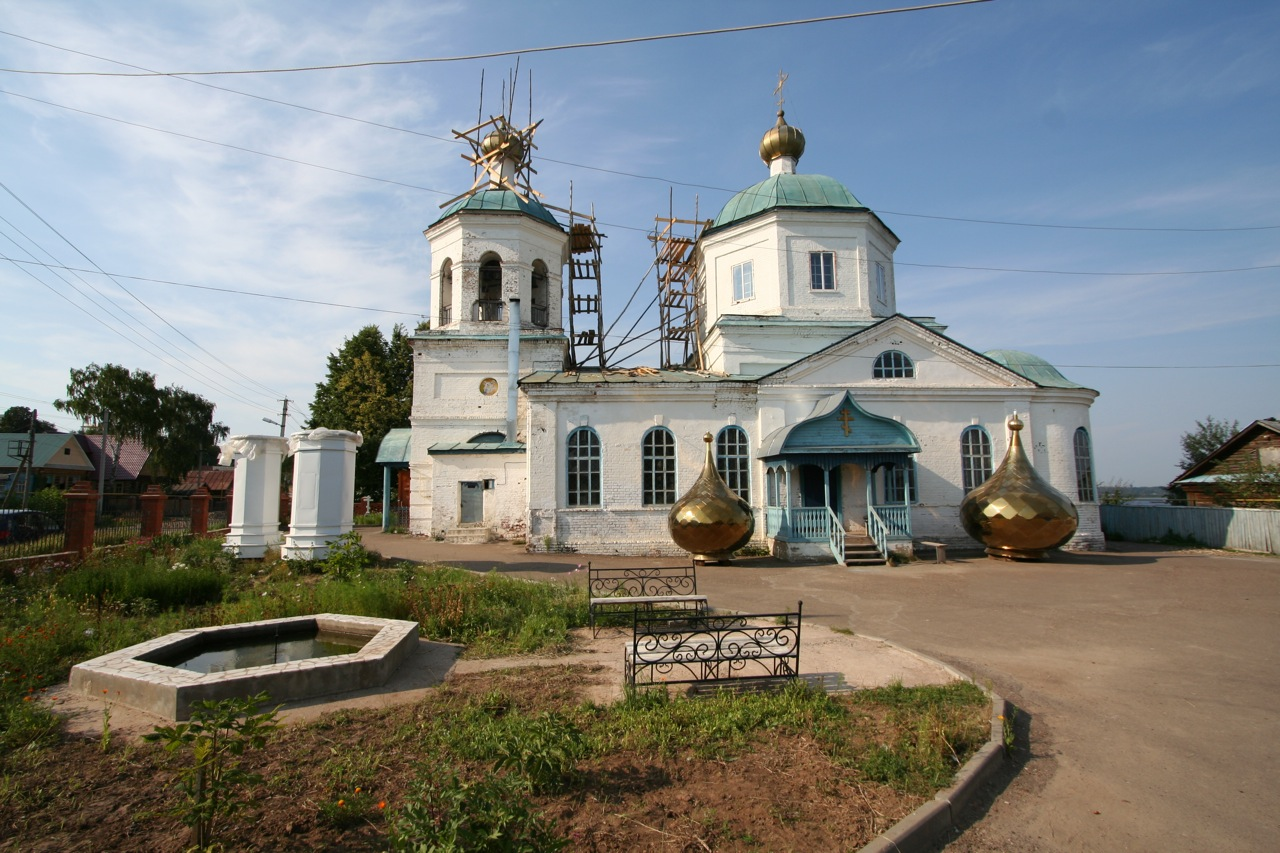
Church of St. Nicholas and Elijah in Verkny Uslon, Tatarstan, Russia.

Verkhny Uslon (Russian: Верхний Услон, Tatar: Югары Ослан) is a rural locality (a selo) and the administrative center of Verkhneuslonsky District of the Republic of Tatarstan, Russia. Population: 4,499 (2010 census); 4,257 (2002 census); 3,891 (1989 Soviet census).
