= Verkhneuslonsky District =

Verkhneuslonsky District Верхнеуслонский район (Russian)
- District

Other transcription(s)
  - Tatar: Югары Ослан районы
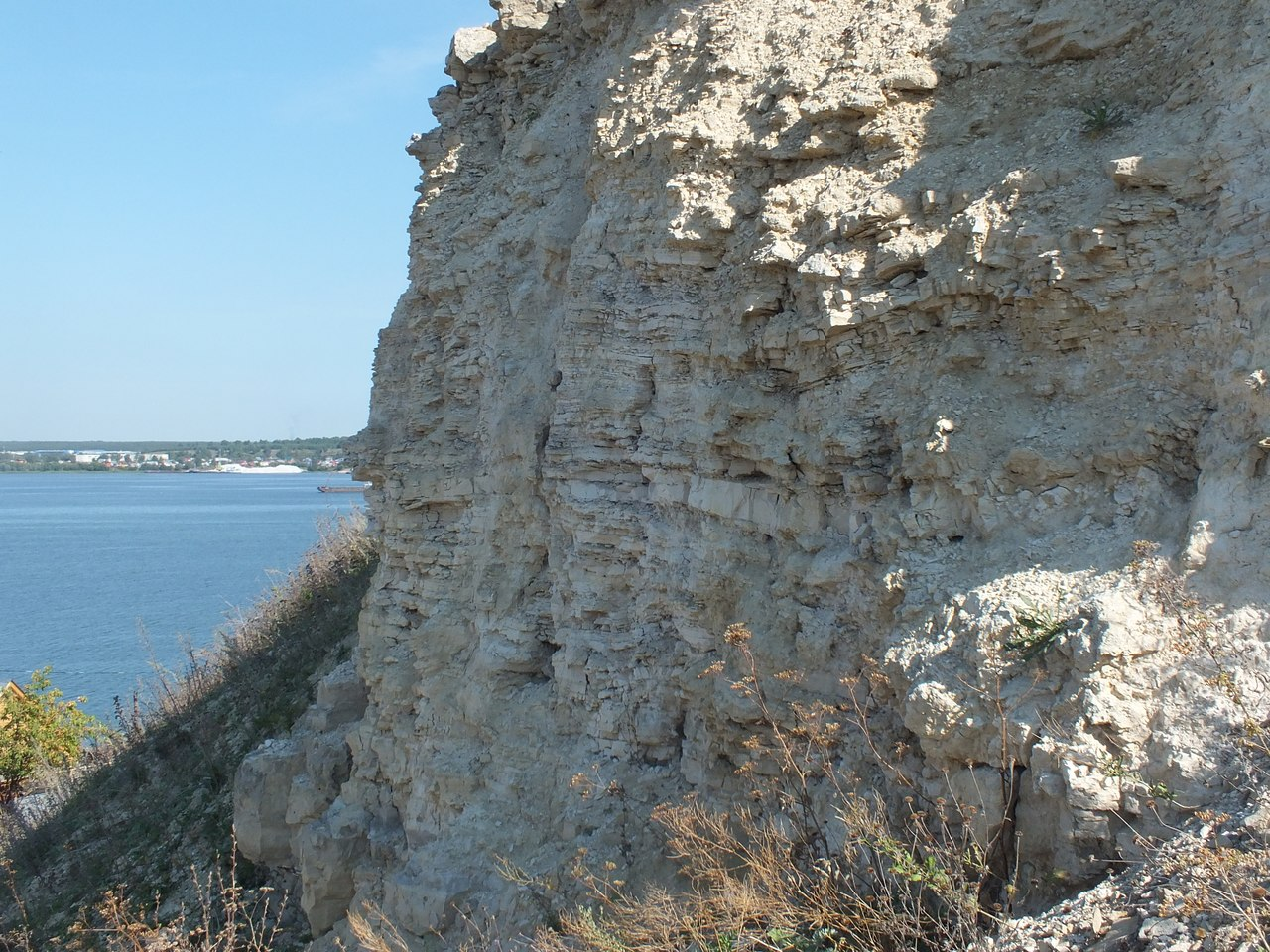
- A geologic record, a protected area of Russia, near the selo of Pechishchi in Verkhneuslonsky District

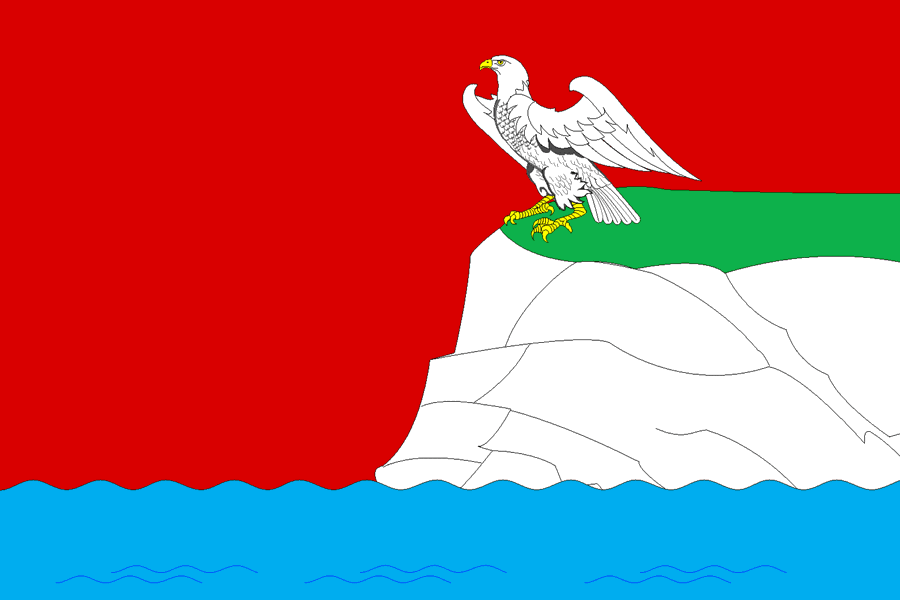
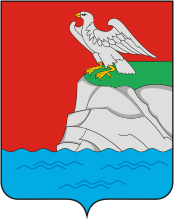
- Flag Coat of arms
- Location of Verkhneuslonsky District in the Republic of Tatarstan
- Coordinates: 55°38′N 48°46′E
- Country: Russia
- Federal subject: Republic of Tatarstan
- Established: 20 October 1931
- Administrative center: Verkhny Uslon

Area
  - Total: 1,373.9 km^{2} (530.5 sq mi)

Population (2010 Census)
  - Total: 16,641
  - Density: 12.112/km^{2} (31.371/sq mi)
  - Urban: 0%
  - Rural: 100%

Administrative structure
  - Inhabited localities: 1 cities/towns, 73 rural localities

Municipal structure
  - Municipally incorporated as: Verkhneuslonsky Municipal District
  - Municipal divisions: 1 urban settlements, 19 rural settlements
- Time zone: UTC+3 (MSK)
- OKTMO ID: 92620000
- Website: http://verhniy-uslon.tatarstan.ru

Verkhneuslonsky District (Russian: Верхнеусло́нский райо́н; Tatar: Югары Ослан районы) is a territorial administrative unit and municipality of the Republic of Tatarstan within the Russian Federation. The district is located in the west of the republic on the right bank of the Volga River and encompasses a total area of 1,373.9 square kilometers (530.5 sq mi). According to the 2010 census, the municipality had a population of 16,641 people. Its administrative center, the selo (village) of Verkhny Uslon, accounts for 27% of the district's total population.

The modern Verkhneuslonsky district was first established in 1931. Since the 16th century, the main occupation of the local population has been the mining of rock and as of 2020 the area was still famous for its brick-making industry. In 2012, the Innopolis special economic zone (SEZ) was established in the district. The special economic zone bears the same name as the city of Innopolis it is located in and became the fifth economic zone of a technology-innovation type in Russia. The district hosted the Colombian men's national football team during the 2018 Russia World Cup.

== Geography ==
The Verkhneuslonsky district is located in the northeastern part of the Volga Uplands, on the right bank of the Volga at the confluence of the Volga with the Sviyaga and Sulitsa rivers. Other large rivers in the region are the Klyancheyka, Changara (tributaries of the Sulitsa) and Biy (tributary of the Sviyaga) and form a total length of at least 15 km. The region shares borders with Zelenodolsky district in the north and north-west; with Kamsko-Ustinsky, Apastovsky and Kaybitsky districts in the south and south-west; with the Laishevsky district of Tatarstan and the Kirovsky district of Kazan in the east across the watershed of the Volga river. Agricultural land covers 84.8 thousand hectares with more than 54 thousand hectares considered arable land while forested areas occupy 23 thousand hectares. The Upper Uslon region is characterized by a temperate climate and the transition of soil and vegetation zones from forest to steppe. The soils are of the clay type and contain limestones, clays, dolomites, sands and sandstones. The terrain is undulating-flat with cliffs, river valleys and numerous ravines.

== Flag and Coat of Arms ==
In March 2006, the Council of the Verkhneuslonsky Municipal District approved its new heraldic insignia. The dominant color of the coat of arms is red symbolizing courage, strength, labor and beauty. Against this background, at the center of the canvas, there is a high and steep bank or “uslon” that is reflected in the region’s name. A falcon sits on the rock recalling the popularity of falconry in the region in ancient times. The bird, ready to fly, symbolizes the linkage of time, the residents aspirations for the future and also symbolizes courage, intelligence, and swiftness. Since most of the district's borders are located along the Volga and Sviyaga, there is a blue wavy strip at the bottom of the emblem representing the geographical features of the area. The flag is based on heraldic elements of the coat of arms. Like the coat of arms, it has a dominant red background and a blue wavy stripe, which occupies 1/5 of the width of the cloth, at the bottom.

== History ==
In the first half of the 16th century, the territory of the modern Verkhneuslonsky district belonged to the Kazan Khanate, and the nearby Sokolnechya Gora was occupied by outlaws and freebooters. In addition to the Don, the Volga was a common place for runaway serfs who faced ever escalating punishments if caught. The territories that lay downstream of Kazan would be called the “grassroots free zone” as a result. From the Sokolka mountain, freebooters looked out for merchant ships passing along the Volga and as a result called themselves “falcons”. Due to the constant robberies and raids organized by the so-called “falcons”, the Muscovite state decided to get rid of the dangerous outlaws. As a result, the Cossack Ataman Ermak Timofeyevich with his army quickly drove the robbers out of the Volga. Shortly after driving out the bandits, the settlement of Pechischi was formed two kilometers from the modern village of Verkhniy Uslon. The inhabitants of the village earned their living by mining near Uslonskaya Gora, rolled stones to the shore and loading them onto barges. Thanks to the stone mined in the village, the walls of the Kazan Kremlin and the Sviyazhsky monastery were rebuilt. A limestone kiln plant was opened in the village and operated until 1980.

Until the 1720s, the territory of the Verkhneuslonsky district belonged to the Sviyazhsky county (uyezd). In 1565, some of the largest settlements of that time were founded in the region including Busurmanskaya Sloboda (130 peasant households), Morkvashi (51 peasant households) and Burnashevo (50 peasant households). Under the reign of Peter the Great, the peasants of the Sviyazhsky district were not assigned to build the new city of St. Petersburg but until the age of 45 they could be recruited for the army. In 1708, the Kazan province was formed and the territory of the modern Verkhneuslonsky district was transferred to the Sviyazhsk province. In the 1775-1780s, as a result of the administrative reforms of the Catherine the Great, the Kazan province was divided into 12 districts. The Verkhneuslonsky district remained a part of Sviyazhsk until 1927, when the eponymous canton of the Tatar ASSR was established.

In 1927, the territory of the Verkhneuslonsky district was divided with one part being transferred to the newly established Tenkovsky district, while another part was left to Sviyazhsky district. In October 1931, the Verkhneuslonsky district was reestablished by merging Tenkovsky and Sviyazhsky districts. During World War II, the Pechishchinsky District Flour Mill Plant supplied Verkhniy Uslon with food. From 1941 to 1942, the Belarusian poet Yanka Kupala (Ivan Dominikovich Lutsevich) lived in a small two-story building next to the plant. In 1958, the lands of the Verkhneuslonsky district expanded to incorporate territories of the disbanded Tenkovsky district. In 1963, the Verkhneuslonsky district was also abolished, and its land transferred to Zelenodolsk. Yet subsequently on January 12, 1965, the Verkhneuslonsky district was reestablished within its current borders.

== Administrative and Municipal Status ==
Within the framework of administrative divisions, the Verkhneuslonsky District is one of the forty-three districts in the republic. In 2019, the population in the Verkhneuslonsky district amounted to 16.2 thousand people. As of the beginning of 2020, 15,935 people lived in the district. In terms of ethnic composition, 67% of the district population are Russians and 33% are Tatars. 2.5% of the district population live in urban conditions in the city of Innopolis.

In 2006, the Verkhneuslonsky district was headed by Vladimir Osyanin who had priorly served as the head of the District Administration since 1997. Osyanin left the post in 2010 in connection with a transfer to the post of head of the department for the protection and use of wildlife objects of the Republic of Tatarstan. Alexander Timofeev who before was the long time head of the Laishevsky district was appointed acting head. He was approved as the head of the Verkhneuslonsky district in 2011, but after a few months Timofeev was dismissed in relation to a bribe of 5 million rubles and a court sentenced him four years in prison. Since 2012, Marat Ziatdinov has occupied the position of the head of the Verkhneuslonsky district.

== Economics ==
=== Industry ===
The largest enterprises in the region include Keramika-Sintez and the Shelangovsky fruit and berry farm “Shelangovsky” in the Shelanga village, Tatkrakhmalpatoka in the Kuralovo village, the Verkhneuslonsky branch of Tatavtodor, as well as the Velvette boat and yacht plant.

In 2008, the “Klyuchischinskaya ceramics” plant with a capacity of 48 million units per year began operations in the village of Klyuchischi. The construction of the plant cost 1.5 billion rubles. In 2012, every tenth brick in Tatarstan was produced at the “Klyuchishchinskaya ceramics” plant. In 2018, the company was declared bankrupt and put up for auction for 581 million rubles and in two years the plant was bought by entrepreneur Vadim Samarkin for 350 million rubles. At this time Samarkin already had his own company “Zavolzhskaya ceramics”, established in 2019. Additionally, there is another district brick factory “Keramika-Sintez” that is owned by TAIF, the largest industrial holding in Tatarstan. As of 2017, the company produced 20 million bricks annually. Materials produced there were used to construct the facilities of the 2013 World University Games in Kazan. In 2019, the company produced 21.3 million units of ceramic stone.

The construction industry in Verkhneuslonsky is also represented by the Matyushinsky quarry enterprise (a subsidiary of Tatagrokhimservice), which extracts limestone for the needs of the road construction and agriculture in Tatarstan. The volume of products manufactured in the Verkhneuslonsky district in 2018 amounted to 59.7 million rubles, and the average number of employees working at enterprises there was more than 40 people. According to the federal statistics agency of Tatarstan, at the beginning of 2019, there were 665 small and medium-sized businesses in the district, of which 425 were individual entrepreneurs. The share of small and medium-sized businesses in the gross territorial product of the Verkhneuslonsky municipal district increased from 26.8 to 30.5% during the period from 2015 to 2018. In January-September of 2020, the value of goods produced and shipped by enterprises operating in the district amounted to 2.5 billion rubles.

=== Agriculture ===
The leading agricultural sectors are the dairy and beef cattle industries and the cultivation of grain and fodder crops. The agricultural sector is primarily represented by seven agricultural enterprises including the four largest: Krasny Vostok-Agro, the Uslon agricultural company, the Zarya enterprise, and Shelanga (a branch of the Narmonka agricultural company) as well as 87 individual farms. Among other enterprises are Zolotoi kolos (a branch of the “Kolos-Sintez” company), Luch, the “Uslon” agrofirm, the Pechishchensky factory of grain products, and the “Nizhny Uslon” cannery. As of July 2019, agricultural producers of all forms of ownership used 54.1 thousand hectares of arable land, rearing 10,202 head of cattle, 3,629 cows, 5 020 pigs and 96 horses. In total, the agricultural sector employed 470 people. In the first half of 2020, the gross agricultural output of the district amounted to 26 million rubles.

Since 2015, a high-tech livestock complex has been operating in the village of Kildeyevo. The total investment in the construction of the complex amounted to more than 260 million rubles in 2017. In the same year, the complex built a sanitary checkpoint for the disinfection of technical transport.

The regional company “Tatkrakhmalpatoka” cultivates and produces dry fermented rye and barley malt which is then supplied to the countries of the former CIS, Poland, Lithuania and China. In 2017, the company held a leading position in Russia in the production of kvass wort concentrate, maltose syrup and malt extracts. According to the CEO, in 2019, the company's revenue amounted to 380 million rubles.

In 2016, The Verkhniy Uslon milk processing plant shipped 22,993 tons of products. In 2018, the enterprise planned to replace the equipment in its butter facility and developed a project to increase the daily volume of processed milk by 25%. The plant took over the repair costs of the central road to the village of Makulovo that leads to the workshops. The volume of products manufactured by the plant in 2018 amounted to 617.6 million rubles. As of 2020, the plant produces 60-70 tons of processed milk per day. According to E-Kazan media, their butter is among the top five in Tatarstan.

=== Investment Potential ===
In 2010, the President of Tatarstan Rustam Minnikhanov announced the idea of creating a science and innovation city on the territory of the Verkhneuslonsky district. In 2012, the town of Innopolis along with a university was founded. Construction lasted three years until its official opening in 2015. Currently, the city occupies the area of 1200 hectares and intended to accommodate the offices of resident companies and laboratories. Innopolis has its own special economic zone (SEZ) whose residents receive tax benefits on revenue, transport, property, land and insurance premiums. As of 2020, 109 companies were residents of the Innopolis SEZ, with 26 of them being partners, and another 50 startups. These companies to date have provided jobs for 3.8 thousand people and invested about 27 billion rubles into the economy of Tatarstan.

There are two technology parks within Innopolis. The first tenants of the space in 2014 were Ak Bars-Bank and Russian Post. As of 2020, according to the General Director of the Innopolis SEZ Renat Khalimov, the occupancy rate of the Popov Technology park is 87%. Another 10% of office space has been booked under preliminary cooperation agreements with companies. The opening of the second industrial park named after Nikolai Lobachevsky with an area of 30 thousand square meters was postponed from the end of 2020 to 2021. In 2020, the opening of a third park was announced to be completed in 2023 with an area of 22.7 hectares. Total investment in the project is tentatively estimated at 1.5 billion rubles. Potential residents, with whom negotiations on cooperation are already underway, plan to work on projects in the field of microelectronics and electromechanics, as well as in industrial robotics and unmanned aerial vehicles together with Innopolis University.

In 2017, the republic authorities announced their intentions to build a large agro-industrial park in the Verkhneuslonsky district. According to preliminary plans, about 420 million rubles will be spent on its construction, including funds allocated by the Ministry of Agriculture of Russia, the Ministry of Agriculture of Tatarstan, municipal authorities, farmers and investors. It is planned to accommodate nine residents at the site, who will be engaged in the production, cutting, processing, packaging, storage and sale of agricultural products.

In January-June 2020, the total volume of investment in fixed assets of the district, excluding budgetary funds, amounted to 1.45 billion rubles. The district authorities plan to increase this amount to 13 billion rubles by 2030, as well as expected tax and non-tax budget revenues to 330 million rubles.

=== Transport ===
Two federal highways pass through the district: the M-7 Volga “Moscow—Nizhny Novgorod— Kazan— Ufa” and the R-241 “Kazan— Buinsk— Ulyanovsk”. Other important highways include the R-241— Verkhniy Uslon, Ulanovo—Bolshiye Kaibitsy and Oktyabrsky— Kamskoye Ustye. Until 2018, connections between various settlements of the Verkhneuslonsky district were provided mainly by water transport. During winters, people were transported using hovercraft. In 2018-2019, as a result of a program to subsidize rural transport, three overland routes were opened in the region: Verkhniy Uslon—Shelanga, Verkhniy Uslon—Kanash and Verkhniy Uslon—Innopolis.

In 2018, the regional authorities announced their intention to build cable cars from the Verkhneuslonsky district to Kazan. In particular, the international company Leitner Ropeways proposed to link Upper Uslon and the Temple of all religions located in Kazan. The route will be 2 km long with a throughput capacity of 1200 people per hour. The project is at the stage of seeking investors with costs estimated at 9 million euros.

The district’s largest settlements are connected by suburban bus service to Kazan, while the distance from the regional center and villages to Kazan by motorways varies from 35-55 km.

== Ecology ==
There are 10 natural monuments and reserves on the territory of the district. These include the “Mountain pine forest” with an area of 70 hectares, “Kamenny ravine”, “Stratigraphic section of the Kazan and Urzhum stages near the village of Kyzyl-Bayrak” with an estimated age of 260 million years, the ravine “Cheryomushki”, “Klykovsky Sklon”, “Tashevskie Sklony”, “Kuralovskie Rodniki” and the “Sulitsa River”. The natural monument “Pechishchensky geological section” is a popular site among geologists around the world, since each layer of the rock corresponds to a different era. Fossil remains of the Upper Permian fauna and flora were found here: ganoid fish, molluscs, sea lilies and algae. The natural monument “KSU Zoo—Dachny massiv” includes the eponymous zoological station, founded in 1916.

== Social Welfare ==
As of 2019, there were 25 schools operating in the district instructing 1,747 students. Another 464 children attend 16 kindergartens. There is a technical school offering courses for professionals like tractor drivers, social workers, and an integrated profession of cook-driver. There is also a children's and youth sports school in Verkhniy Uslon. The cultural resources of the district include a centralized club system with 33 branches and a library system with 25 branches, a children's art school and a local history museum, which was opened in 2001. The regional newspaper “Volzhskaya Nov” is published in Russian.

From 1920 to 1940, the famous composer Salikh Saydashev spent his summer months in the village of Kyzyl Bayrak. To commemorate this, a musical festival has been organized there since 2000. Notable artists and musicians from the republic perform at the event and in 2005 the composer's works were performed for the first time by a symphony orchestra.

=== Sights ===
The former steam mill of the Ivan Okonishnikov and Sons Trading House built in 1895 is a surviving architectural monument built in the area. In one of the buildings there is a museum named after Yanka Kupala, a poet evacuated to the region during the Great Patriotic War. According to statistics, more than 10 thousand tourists visited the museum in 2017 and 2018. Additionally, in the village of Klyuchischi, there is the estate of the Marquis Paulucci dated the late 19th-early 20th centuries, which is in disrepair and is looking for investors for its restoration. As part of the regional tourism development program in 2018, a guest house “Vvedenskaya Usadba” was opened in the village of Vvedenskaya Sloboda. In the region there are also suburban summer cottages, houses and recreation centers (Pustye i Naberezhnye Morkvashi, Shelanga and others), an equestrian sports complex Shelanga and a modern year-round ski sports and recreation complex “Kazan”.

There are many historical temples on the territory of the district, including:

- The Church of the Presentation of the Most Holy Theotokos (the village of Vvedenskaya Sloboda), built in 1782, currently it houses the courtyard of the Makakryevsky Monastery and restoration work is underway;
- Church of St. Nicholas the Wonderworker (village of Verkhniy Uslon), built in 1831
- Church of St. Nicholas the Wonderworker (village Verkhniy Uslon), built in 1831;
- The two-altar church of the Nativity of Christ (Shelanga village), built in 1783;у
- Temple of St. Sergius of Radonezh (the village of Nizhny Uslon), built in 1890;
- Temple in honor of St. Nicholas the Wonderworker (Korguz village), built in 1887;
- Church of the Icon of the Mother of God “The Inexhaustible Chalice” (Kuralovo village), built in 2001;
- The bell tower of the Church of the Transfiguration of the Savior (Maidan village), built in 1768;
- Temple of the Position of the Lord's Robe (Tikhy Plyos village), built in 1877;
- Temple of the Image of the Savior Not Made by Hands (Ulanovo village), built in 1802.

=== Famous Residents ===
- Kafil Fakhrazeevich Amirov — an official Prosecutor of the Republic of Tatarstan, born in 1949 in the village of Nariman, Verkhneuslonsky District;
- Vladimir Vyacheslavovich Belokurov — theater and film actor, People's Artist of the USSR, was born in 1904 in the village of Nizhny Uslon, Sviyazhsky district;
- Alexander Yuryevich Uslontsev — inventor and engineer, who contributed to the development and mass production of shipping labels, born 1975;
- Semyon Vasilyevich Konovalov — Hero of the Soviet Union, was born in 1920 in the village of Yambulatovo.

== Bibliography ==
- Abramov, L. G. (2001). Verkhnii Uslon: krai rodnoi, navek liubimyi… [Verkhniy Uslon: a native land, forever beloved ...] Kazan: Po gorodam i vesiam.
- Tatarskii entsiklopedicheskii slovar [Tatar encyclopedic dictionary]. Kazan: Institut Tatarskoi entsiklopedii AN RT. 1999.
- Suprunenko, Yu.P. (2007). Noveishaia entciklopediia tainstvennykh mest Rossii [The newest encyclopedia of mysterious places in Russia]. Moscow: Gelios.
- Zigashin, I.I.; Ivanov, D.V.; Tomaeva, I.F. (2015). Ekologicheskii gid po zelenym ugolkam Respubliki Tatarstan [Ecological guide to the nature of the Republic of Tatarstan] (PDF). Kazan: Foliant. Archived from the original (PDF) on January 8, 2021.
