= Rina Zaripova =

Rina Bayan qızı Zaripova
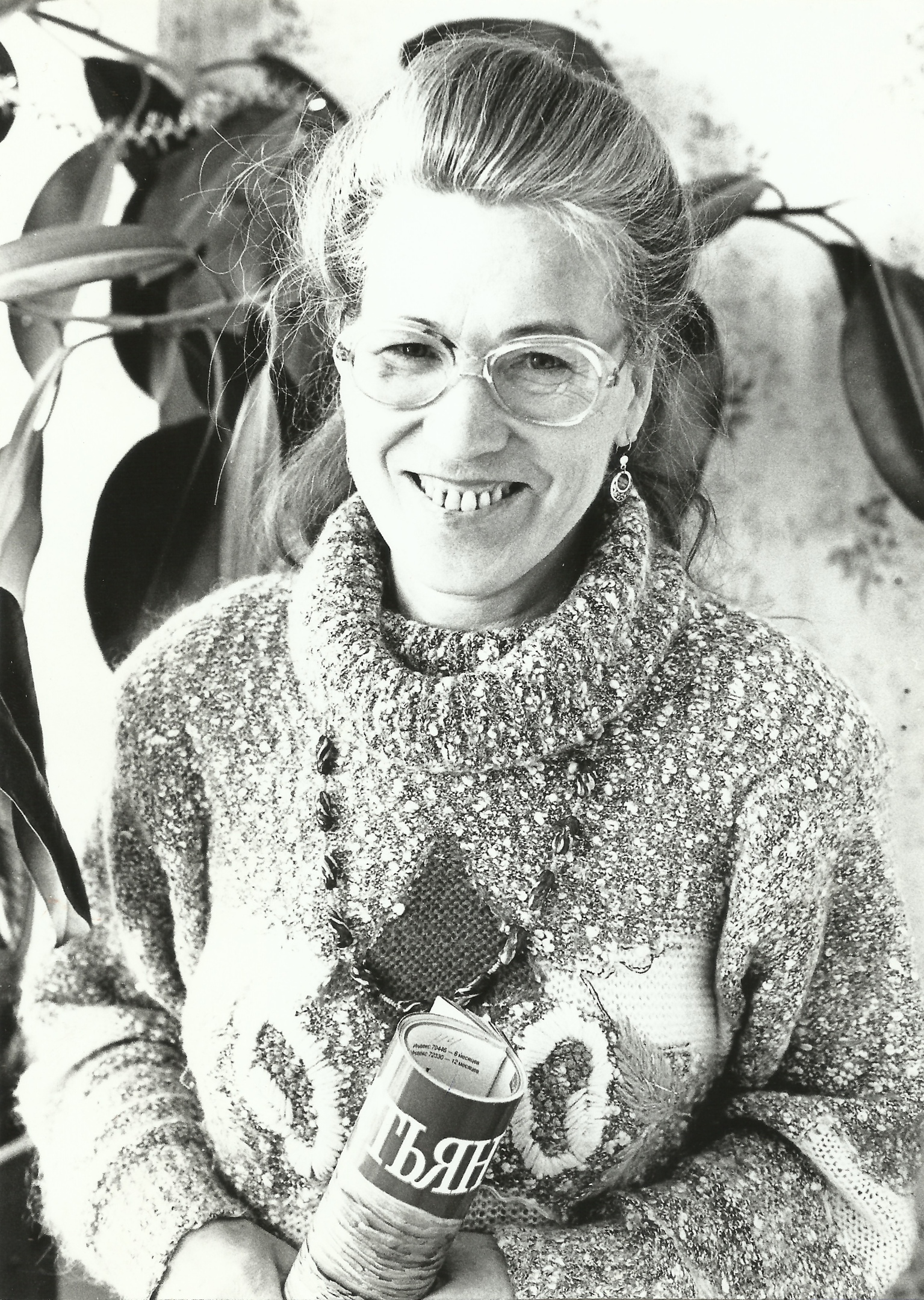
- Born: 12 March 1941; Meñnär, Aktanyshsky District, Tatar ASSR, Soviet Union
- Died: 10 January 2008 (aged 66); Kazan, Tatarstan Republic, Russian Federation
- Citizenship: Soviet Union→ Russia; Tatarstan Republic
- Occupations: journalist; translator; teacher
- Spouse: Zahit Zarifov
- Parents: Fätxelbayan Ağumov (1903-1973) (father); Mäsrürä Zarifullina (1908–1983) (mother)

Rina Zaripova (Tatar: Rina Bayan qızı Zarifova; 12 (19) March 1941 – 10 January 2008) was a Tatar journalist, translator, teacher, Merited Culture Worker of Tatarstan Republic (1995), and prizewinner of the competition for journalists "Bällür qäläm", or "Crystal pen" (2001).

In 1973–2002, she worked as letters department manager in the newspaper "Tatarstan yäşläre", or "Youth of Tatarstan". Her articles cover a wide range of issues related to the problems of morality, upbringing, family, etc.

== Life ==
=== Early life ===
Born in village Meñnär on 12 March 1941, she was a daughter of school teachers Mäsrürä Zarifullina and Fätxelbayan Ağumov. The wrong date 19 March was registered on her birth certificate. Сoming from a line of mullahs, her father with his family had to change many places of work due to the policies of communists. Two of her father's brothers and her grandmother were repressed and were shot in 1930, 1936, and 1937. Always obliged to move between different places, her family stayed for a short while in Meñnär and Käzkäy. There were 8 children in the family. Her father participated in the Great Patriotic War. After that, her family moved to Yaña Älem, where she had her two-year primary education. Then, her family moved for a while to the villages of İske Soltanğol, Şärip and Yuğarı Gäräy. She finished her ten-year school education in Yuğarı Gäräy.

In 1960, she was admitted to the faculty of Russian-Tatar philology of Elabuga Pedagogical Institute and finished her education in 1965. Sent by Institute, she taught Russian literature and language at school of the villages of Tatar Saralanı (1964–1967) and Keçe Yılğa (1967–1968). In 1967, she married a physics teacher Zahit Zarifov.

=== Life in Kazan ===
In 1968, the Zaripov family moved to Kazan. On February 20, 1969, she started working for the newspaper "Tatarstan yäşläre". In 1973, she became a letters department manager and occupied this position until October 1, 2002.

On February 13, 1995, she received the title of "Merited Cultural Worker of Tatarstan Republic". On May 17, in 2001, she became a prizewinner of journalists contest "Bällür qäläm" in the nomination "Honor and respect".

=== Retirement ===
After her retirement, she continued to publish in such magazines and newspapers as "Tatarstan yäşläre", "Tatar ile" ("Tatar's world"), "Watanım Tatarstan" ("My homeland Tatarstan"), "Şähri Qazan" ("City Kazan"), "Молодежь Татарстана" ("Youth of Tatarstan"), "Mäğrifät" ("Enlightenment"), journal "İdel" ("The Volga River").

In 2003, the "Yaña Ğasır", or "The New Century" channel aired an episode of the program "Adäm belän Xäwa", or "Adam and Eve" dedicated to the Zaripov family. In 2005, she was awarded the medal "In Commemoration of the 1000th Anniversary of Kazan".

=== Death, funeral and memorials ===
In the final years, after the discovery of cancerous tumors, two surgeries on her were undergone. She died from cancer on 10 January 2008, her body was buried in Muslim cemetery of Kazan on the Mamadyshsky route.

On March 5, 2021, Rail Sadrıy prepared the broadcast "Küñel cılısın öläşkändä", or "Leaving a heartfelt warmth" on "Tatarstan radio" for the 80th anniversary of Rina Zaripova. In March and April 2021, a number of articles, such as "Ğomer yulı üze ber sänğätter..." ("The pathway of life as an art..."), "Serdäşçe apabız" ("Our confidante"), "Meñnärneñ serdäşe häm äñgämädäşe" ("The confidante of a thousand") dedicated to Rina Zaripova were published in Tatar newspapers and journals.

== Newspaper "Tatarstan yäşläre" ==
Rina Zaripova was not only a letters department manager of the newspaper "Tatarstan Yäşläre", but also led the sections closely related to this department.

=== "Serdäş" section ===
For the first time, Rina Zaripova discovered the "Serdäş", or "Confidante" section of the newspaper "Tatarstan yäşläre" through her students from the village Tatar Saralanı. In this section, opened by the journalist, the letters department manager Sufiya Akhmetova, the newspaper's readers shared their questions with the hope of getting a support of the newspaper and readers in matters of morality, upbringing, family, etc.

On February 20, 1969, Rina Zaripova began working in the newspaper "Tatarstan Yäşläre". First, she serves as a translator and assistant to the manager of the letters department, the journalist Sufiya Akhmetova. After Sufiya Akhmetova retired, for several years in 1970, the letters department and this section were managed by different people: Farit Khakimzyanov, Galiya Raimova, Farit Galiyev, etc. Then, the letters department and "Serdäş" section were taken over by Rina Zaripova.

=== "Şimbä" section ===
The section of the newspaper "Şimbä" ("Saturday") was dedicated to various outstanding personalities of the Tatar ASSR, there were often published songs by famous composers with notes at the request of readers. Due to the fact that readers often asked for publications of songs by Sara Sadıyqova, Rina Zaripova had to see her regularly from time to time, which later brought them closer and made friends.

== Books ==
In 1982, the Tatar Book Publishers released the first book by Rina Zaripova, "Ğailä cılısı", or "Family warmth", which was composed of her articles based on letters from readers of different years. The book reveals different social problems, which are closely related to the topic of the family; each section of it ends with the author's conclusion.

In 1980-1990s, Rina Zaripova's essays were published in various collections of articles. Among them, there is a book "Täwbä", or "Repentance" compiled by Rina Zaripova and Yäzilä Abudkadyrova, published in 1991 by the Tatar Book Publishers.

== Family ==
Her husband, Zahit Sadrislam ulı Zarifov, was a senior teacher, an engineer in Kazan National Research Technological University for a long time. They are parents of 4 children.

Her grandson, Farhad Bakhtiiari, is a composer, musicologist, and teacher.

== Memories ==
Rina Zaripova was admired by different literature readings of the works by the classics of Tatar prose, poetry, and drama in The Radio of Tatarstan. She was also fond of the readings in The Radio of Russia, especially novels by Jack London and "And Quiet Flows the Don" by Mikhail Sholokhov. She often got to be reminded about the hurry, which overflows her in rare returns to lunch-break to listen to the readings in the Radios.

== Publications ==
=== Articles ===
- Zaripova, Rina (January 2003). "İ, ğomer ağışları..." [O flowing rivers of our lifes...]. Youth of Tatarstan (in Tatar) (10319 /11). Qazan: İdel-Press.
- Zaripova, Rina (March 2005). "Meñnärneñ seren sıydırğan "Serdäş"" ["The Confidante" is holding thousand's secrets]. Youth of Tatarstan (in Tatar) (10658 /38). Qazan: İdel-Press.
- Zaripova, Rina (December 2004). "Onıtılmas xatirälär" [Unforgettable memories]. Youth of Tatarstan (in Tatar) (10612 /70). Qazan: İdel-Press.
- Zaripova, Rina (November 2004). "Şıfalı "qan'eçkeçlär"" [Healing leaches]. Youth of Tatarstan (in Tatar) (10597 /55). Qazan: İdel-Press.
- Zaripova, Rina (February 2003). "Tirän mäğnäle berqatlılıq" [Deep meaningful simplicity]. Youth of Tatarstan (in Tatar) (10327 /19). Qazan: İdel-Press.
- Zaripova, Rina (December 2006). "Yaña yıl – moğciza, ä bez romantiqlar idek" [New year is a miracle, and we were romantics]. Youth of Tatarstan (in Tatar) (10929 /75). Qazan: İdel-Press.

=== Books ===
- Zaripova, Rina (1982). Ğailä cılısı [Family warmth]. Kazan: Tatar Book Publishers. p. 56.
- Wäliev, Ğäzinur, ed. (1990). Cide yul çatında [At the crossroads of seven ways]. Kazan: Tatar Books Publishers. p. 191. ISBN 5-298-00899-2.
- Abdulqadıyrova, Yäzilä; Zaripova, Rina, eds. (1991). Täwbä [Repentance]. Kazan: Tatar Books Publishers. p. 136. ISBN 5-298-00662-0.

=== Translations ===
- Skarzhinsky, M.; Chekmarev, V. (1999). Bazar iqtisadınnan 20 däres: Tatar ğomumi belem mäkt. 10 nçı s-fı öçen däreslek [20 lessons of market economy: textbook for students of the 10th grade of secondary schools] (in Tatar). Translated by Şämsetdinova, Gölsinä; Zaripova, Rina. Qazan: Mäğärif. p. 118. ISBN 5-7761-0617-6.

== Sources ==
=== Books ===
- Ğimadieva, Naciä (2014). Mäktäbem - yaqtı yulım [My school is a bright path]. Qazan: İdel-press. p. 96.
- Muratov, F.; Xucin, Y. (2003). Aqtanış - tuğan cirem [Aktanysh is my native land]. Qazan: İdel-press. pp. 174–175.
- Samat, Älfiä (2007). "Jurnalist". Min yaratam sezne... [I love you...] (in Tatar). Qazan: Полигран-Т. pp. 229–237. ISBN 978-5-902724-02-5.
- Zaripova, Rina (1982). Ğailä cılısı [Family warmth]. Kazan: Tatar Book Publishers. p. 56.
- Abdulqadıyrova, Yäzilä; Zaripova, Rina, eds. (1991). Täwbä [Repentance]. Kazan: Tatar Books Publishers. p. 136. ISBN 5-298-00662-0.

=== Articles ===
- Bäxtiari, Färhad (2 April 2021). "Meñnärneñ serdäşe häm äñgmädäşe" [The confidante of a thousand]. Bezneñ miras (in Tatar) (328 / 4). Qazan: İdel-Press.
- Bäxtiarov, Färhad (March 2021). "Ğomer yulı üze ber sänğätter..." [The pathway of life as an art...]. Youth of Tatarstan (in Tatar) (12483 / 8). Qazan: İdel-Press.
- Ğimadieva, Naciä (5 February 2015). "Sağınabız sezne, Rina apa" [We miss you, Rina apa]. Youth of Tatarstan (in Tatar) (12174/4). Qazan: İdel-Press.
- Safiullina, Nazilä (11 March 2021). "Serdäşçe apabız" [Our confidante]. Youth of Tatarstan (in Tatar) (12484 / 9). Qazan: İdel-Press.
- Xäyrullina, Miläwşä (9 February 2008). "Onıtıla torğan keşe tügel sin, Rina apa" [Unforgettable Rina apa]. Youth of Tatarstan (in Tatar) (11105 /17).
- Zaripova, Rina (March 2005). "Meñnärneñ seren sıydırğan "Serdäş"" ["The Confidante" is holding thousand's secrets]. Youth of Tatarstan (in Tatar) (10658 /38). Kazan: İdel-Press.
- Zaripova, Rina (December 2004). "Onıtılmas xatirälär" [Unforgettable memories]. Youth of Tatarstan (in Tatar) (10612 /70). Qazan: İdel-Press.
