= Ulu Kaban =

Village in Tatarstan, Russia

Ulu Kaban (Russian: Большие Кабаны, Tatar: Олы Кабан) is a village in the Layush District of the Republic of Tatarstan, Russia.

== Geography ==
The village is located approximately 10 kilometers west of Layush, and about 45 kilometers southeast of Kazan, the capital of Tatarstan.

== History ==
The settlement of Ulu Kaban has been first mentioned in the Russian records (Pistsovaya Kniga) in 1567, probably being a pre-existing Tatar village. Historically, it was part of the Kazan Governorate. Before the 1917 Russian revolution, it was also alternatively known as Vvedenskoye. Locals were primarily engaged in farming, cattle breeding, beekeeping, sheep breeding, and blacksmithing. Meat produced was supplied to Kazan. The first school opened in 1840 During the Soviet period, it became part of the Layush District of the Tatar ASSR.

== Population ==
Year	Population
1782	285 (men only)
1859	998
1884	1,172
1897	1,407
1920	1,547
1926	1,669
1949	983
1958	1,060
1970	610
1979	598
1989	508
2002	543
2010	646
2017	974 (Russians)

== Infrastructure ==
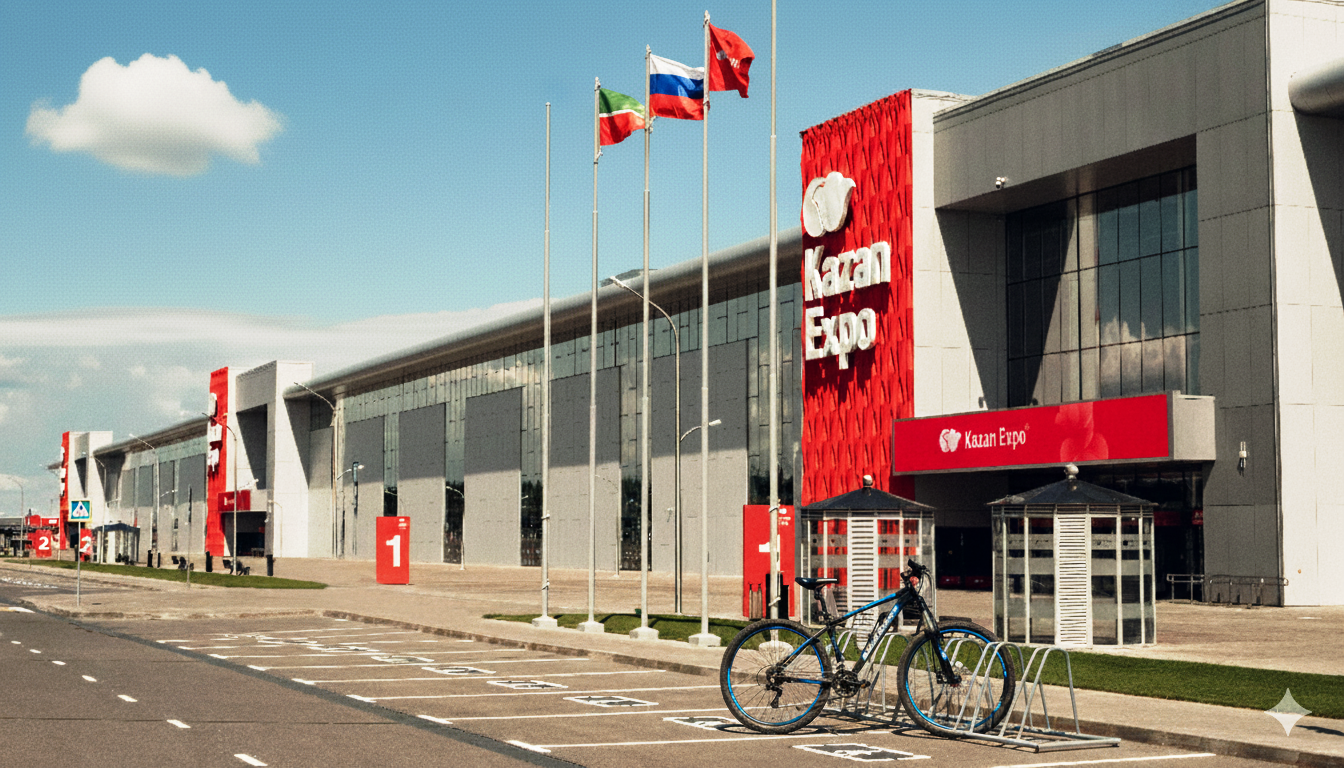
Kazan Expo in the Ulu Kaban rural settlement. The facade facing Kazan Airport, doors A1, A2, A3

Ulu Kaban has a secondary school that also hosts an arts school branch. The cultural center, initially opened in the 1950s, has been reconstructed in 2014. The local medical station is equipped to provide first aid and perform deliveries. The main economic activities in the village include agriculture and livestock farming, with Tatar Agricultural Research and Design Institute maintaining a research station and cultivating experimental fields in the village.

Kazan Expo, an international exhibition center was opened in 2018, 3 km to the south of the village, within the borders of the eponymous rural settlement.

In November 2025, plans have been rolled out to build an outlet village in Ulu Kaban.

== Transportation ==
The village is connected by local roads to Layush and other nearby settlements, the nearest major highway being R239 (Kazan-Orenburg). Bus No. 197 connects the village with Kazan's Eastern Bus Terminal.

Abdulla Tokay Kazan International Airport is situated 5 km south of the village.

== Notable people ==
Valentin Ivanovich Andreev (1940–2015) – Pedagogue and Doctor of Pedagogical Sciences. He served as head of the Pedagogy and Psychology Department (1985–1994) and later the Pedagogy Department (1994–2010) at Kazan University. Andreev was known for his work on creative self-development in education and founded the journal Education and Self-Development.

Pyotr Ivanovich Naumov (1912–1991) – Soldier in the Soviet-Finnish War and World War II, awarded all three classes of the Order of Glory, becoming a Full Cavalier. After the war, he returned to the village to live and work. A street in the village bears his name in honor of his service.
