= Färit Yarullin =

Russian composer

- Фәрит Яруллин; Фарид Яруллин
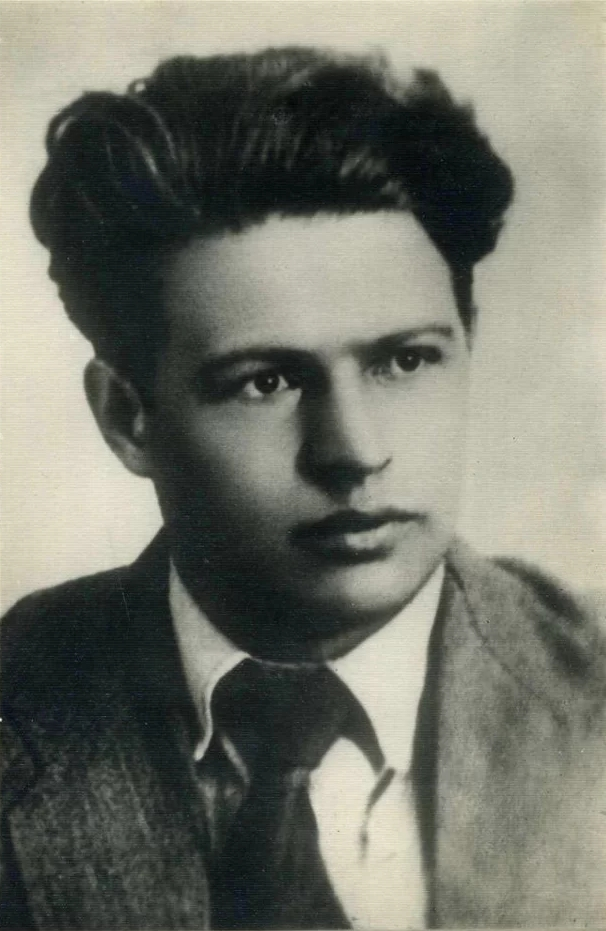
- Born: March 18, 1914; Xäyerbi, Laishevsky, Kazan Governorate, Russian Empire
- Died: October 17, 1943 (aged 29); Vitebsk Region, General District of White Ruthenia, RKO
- Occupation: Composer
- Years active: 1930–1943

Yarullin Färit Zahidulla uğlı (pronounced [jʌrˈulʲin fæˈrit zɑhidulˈlɑː uˈlo]) aka Färit Yarullin; Tatar Cyrillic: Яруллин Фәрит Заһидулла улы; Russian: Яру́ллин Фари́д Загиду́ллович, Yarullin Farid Zagidullovich; 1914 – 1943) was a Tatar composer, the creator of the first Tatar ballet, Şüräle. His works include chamber music, romances, songs and arrangement of folk music. He participated in World War II and was killed in action in 1943.

In 1958, fifteen years after his death, he became a Ğabdulla Tuqay Tatar ASSR State Prize laureate.

== References and notes ==
- "Färit Yarullin/Фәрит Яруллин". Tatar Encyclopaedia (in Tatar). Kazan: The Republic of Tatarstan Academy of Sciences. Institution of the Tatar Encyclopaedia. 2002.
- "Shurale" at Mariinsky Theatre
