= Päräw =

Päräw Пәрәү
- selo
- Location within Tatarstan
- Country: Russia
- Region: Tatarstan
- District: Layış District

Population (2017)
  - Total: 687
- Time zone: UTC+3:00

Päräw (Tatar: Пәрәү, romanized: Päräw) is a rural locality (a selo) in Layış District, Tatarstan. The population was 750 as of 2010. Päräw is located 21 km from Lаyış, district's administrative centre, and 44 km from Qazаn, republic's capital, by road. The earliest known record of the settlement dates from 1602/1603. There are 15 streets in the village.
