= Gäbiş =

Gäbiş Гәбиш
- selo
- Location within Tatarstan
- Country: Russia
- Region: Tatarstan
- District: Layış District

Population (2021)
  - Total: 4,249
- Time zone: UTC+3:00

Gäbiş (Tatar: Гәбиш, romanized: Gäbiş) is a rural locality (a selo) in Layış District, Tatarstan. The population was 2527 as of 2010. Gäbiş is located 60 km from Layış, district's administrative centre, and 27 km from Qazan, republic's capital, by road. The village was established in 1970s. There are 22 streets in the village.
