= Yarullin (surname) =

Yarullin is a surname. Notable people with the surname include:

- Albert Yarullin (born 1993), Russian ice hockey player
- Färit Yarullin (1914–1943), Russian composer
