= Ağaybaş =

Derjavin Державин
- selo
- Location within Tatarstan
- Country: Russia
- Region: Tatarstan
- District: Layış District

Population (2017)
  - Total: 466
- Time zone: UTC+3:00

Derjavin (Derzhavino, Tatar: Державин, romanized: Derjavin) is a rural locality (a selo) in Layış District, Tatarstan. The population was 453 as of 2010. Derjavin is located 19 km from Layış, district's administrative centre, and 43 km from Qazan, republic's capital, by road. The earliest known record of the settlement dates from 16th century. There are 12 streets in the village.
