= Tatar Yantığı =

Tatar Yantığı Татар Янтыгы
- selo
- Location within Tatarstan
- Country: Russia
- Region: Tatarstan
- District: Layış District

Population (2017)
  - Total: 304
- Time zone: UTC+3:00

Tatar Yantığı (Tatar: Татар Янтыгы, romanized: Tatar Yantığı) is a rural locality (a selo) in Layış District, Tatarstan. The population was 366 as of 2010. Tatar Yantığı is located 35 km from Layış, district's administrative centre, and 65 km from Qazan, republic's capital, by road. The earliest known record of the settlement dates from 1710/1711. There are 7 streets in the village.
