= Saba River =

Saba River may refer to:

- Saba (Luga), a river in Leningrad Oblast, Russia
- Saba River (Japan), a river in Yamaguchi Prefecture, Japan
- Saba (Kazkash), a tributary of the Kazkash in Sabinsky District, Tatarstan, Russia

== See also ==
- Sabha River, in eastern Nepal
- Sava, a river in Central and Southeast Europe
