= Atabay, Laishevsky District =

Atabay Атабай
- selo
- Location within Tatarstan
- Country: Russia
- Region: Tatarstan
- District: Layış District

Population (2017)
  - Total: 504
- Time zone: UTC+3:00

Atabay (Tatar: Атабай, romanized: Atabay) is a rural locality (a selo) in Layış District, Tatarstan. The population was 515 as of 2010. Atabay, Laishevsky District is located 88 km from Layış, district's administrative centre, and 63 km from Qazan, republic's capital, by road. The village already existed during the period of the Qazan Khanate. There are 13 streets in the village.
