= Tatar Saralanı =

Tatar Saralanı Татар Сараланы
- selo
- Location within Tatarstan
- Country: Russia
- Region: Tatarstan
- District: Layış District

Population (2010)
  - Total: 330
- Time zone: UTC+3:00

Tatar Saralanı (Tatar: Татар Сараланы, romanized: Tatar Saralanı) is a rural locality (a selo) in Layış District, Tatarstan. The population was 330 as of 2010. Tatar Saralanı is located 98 km from Layış, district's administrative centre, and 56 km from Qazan, republic's capital, by road. The earliest known record of the settlement dates from 1602/1603. There are 8 streets in the village.
