= Myosha =

River in Tatarstan, Russia

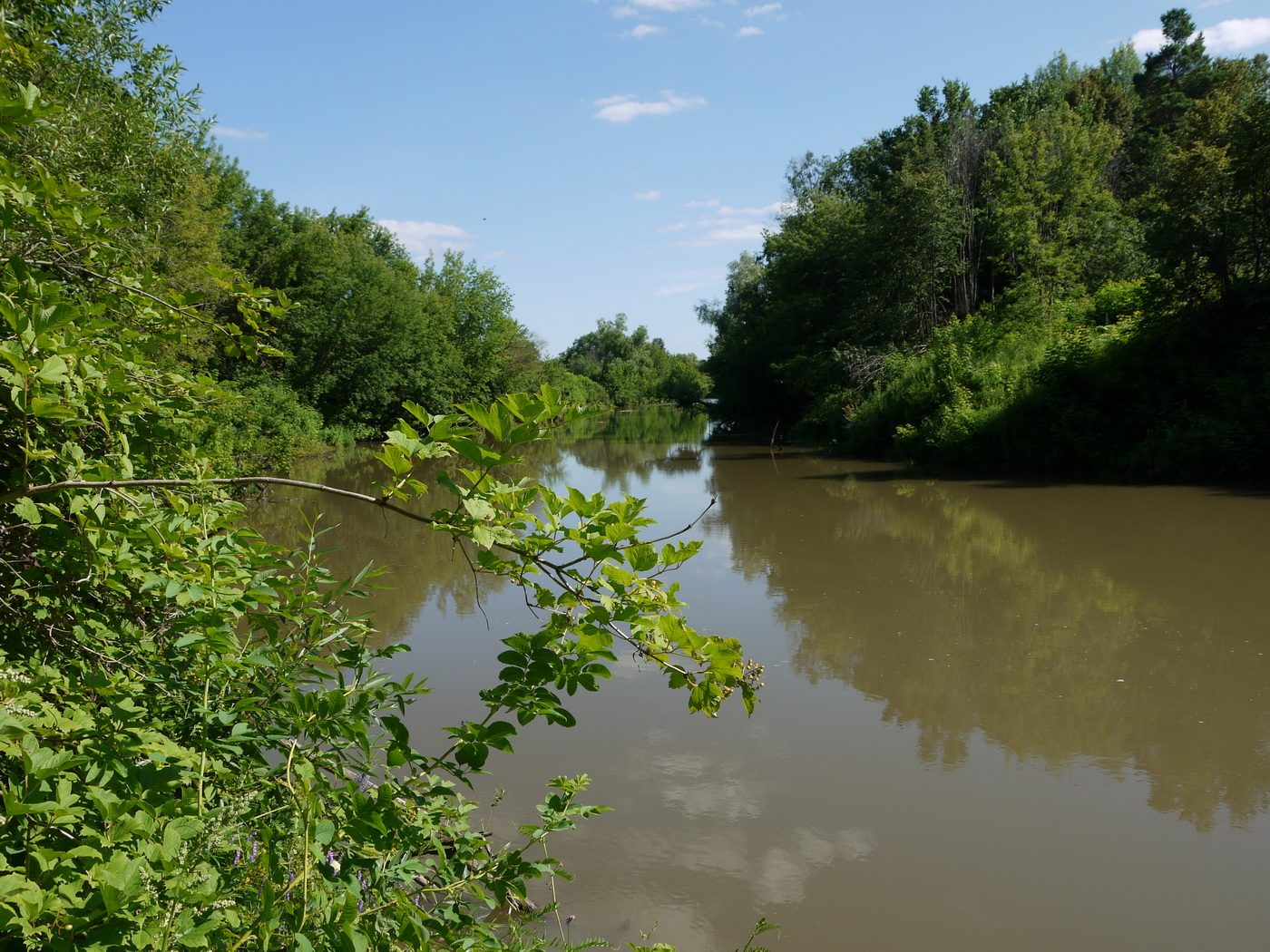

Location
- Country: Russia

Physical characteristics
- Source
  - location: Yatmas-Dusay, Kukmorsky District, Tatarstan
- Mouth: Kama
  - location: Kuybyshev Reservoir, near Narmonka, Tatarstan
  - coordinates: 55°27′42″N 49°21′29″E
  - elevation: 53 m (174 ft)
- Length: 204 km (127 mi)
- Basin size: 4,180 km^{2} (1,610 sq mi)
- Discharge
  - average: 1,400 m^{3}/s (49,000 cu ft/s) (maximum)

Basin features
- Progression: Kama→ Volga→ Caspian Sea

The Myosha (Tatar: Мишә; Russian: Мёша) is a river in Tatarstan, Russian Federation, a right-bank tributary of the Kama. It flows southward, east of and parallel to the Volga and joins the Kama just before that river joins the Volga. It originates in a forest near the Yatmas-Dusay village of the Kukmorsky District and flows into the Kuybyshev Reservoir west of Narmonka village. It is 204 kilometres (127 mi) long, and its drainage basin covers 4,180 square kilometres (1,610 mi^{2}). The river is fed by snow and rain, and from November till April it is usually frozen.

Major tributaries are the Kazkash, Little Myosha, Tyamtibash, Nyrsa, Nurminka, and Sula rivers. The maximal water discharge was 1,400 cubic metres per second (49,000 cu ft/s) in 1979, and the maximal mineralization was 800–1,000 mg/L. Drainage is regulated. Myosha is a local recreation zone. Since 1978 it has been protected as a natural monument of Tatarstan.
