= Naberezhnye Chelny State Pedagogical University =

- Набережночелнинский государственный педагогический университет
- Former names: Naberezhnye Chelny State Pedagogical Institute, Naberezhnye Chelny Institute of Socio-Pedagogical Technologies and Resources
- Type: public
- Established: 1990
- Rector: Alfinur Galiakberova
- Students: 4500 (2015)
- Location: 28 Nizametdinova Street, Naberezhnye Chelny, Tatarstan, Russia; 55°42′13″N 52°21′00″E
- Campus: urban
- Website: www.ggpi.org

The Naberezhnye Chelny State Pedagogical University (NCSPU; Russian: Набережночелнинский государственный педагогический университет, НГПУ; Tatar: Яр Чаллы дәүләт педагогика университеты, romanized: Yar Çallı däwlät pedagogika universitetı) is an instite of higher pedagogical education in Naberezhnye Chelny, Tatarstan, Russia.

== History ==
On September 1, 1990, in accordance with the resolution of the Council of Ministers of the RSFSR, the Naberezhnye Chelny State Pedagogical Institute was established on the basis of the branch of the Elabuga Pedagogical Institute that had existed in the city since 1980. The main initiators of acquiring the status of an independent university were Yuri Petrushin, Talgat Galiullin and Zinnur Sharafutdinov. The latter became its first rector. In addition to the faculties operating at the time of the institute's opening — pedagogical, art and graphic and preschool education — new ones were organized: philological, mathematical, and later natural geography and foreign languages.

The city authorities, as well as the KamAZ plant, played a major role in the development of the material and technical base of the institute. In 1994, with their support, the second academic building was put into operation, new specialties and postgraduate studies were opened.

In May 2011, the instite was renamed the Naberezhnye Chelny Institute of Socio-Pedagogical Technologies and Resources, and in December 2015, it achieved the status of university and renamed the Naberezhnye Chelny State Pedagogical University.

== Education ==
As of 2022, in the university the education process was organized at 6 faculties:

- Faculty of Pedagogy and Psychology,
- Faculty of Philology,
- Faculty of Physical Culture and Sports,
- Faculty of History and Geography,
- Faculty of Mathematics and Computer Science,
- Faculty of Arts and Design.

There is also an Industrial Pedagogical College, which carries out activities in the field of secondary vocational education, and the Institute of Additional Education.
