= Laishevsky District =

Laishevsky District Лаишевский район (Russian)
- District

Other transcription(s)
  - Tatar: Лаеш районы
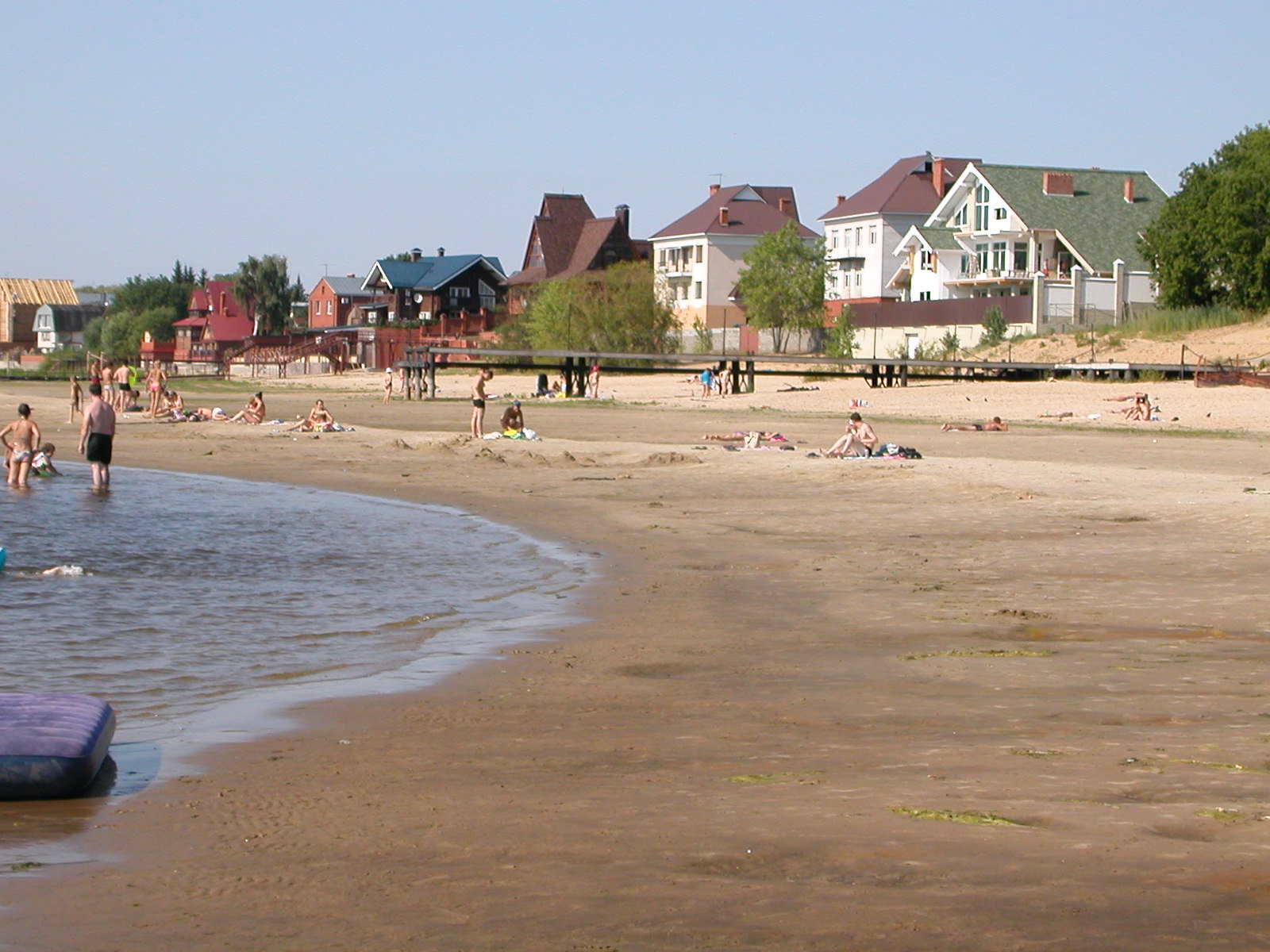
- Waterfront in Borovoe Matyushino, Laishevsky District

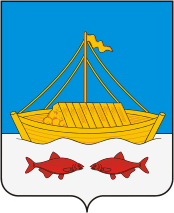
- Flag Coat of arms
- Location of Laishevsky District in the Republic of Tatarstan
- Coordinates: 55°30′N 49°26′E
- Country: Russia
- Federal subject: Republic of Tatarstan
- Established: 14 February 1927
- Administrative center: Laishevo

Area
  - Total: 2,094.43 km^{2} (808.66 sq mi)

Population (2010 Census)
  - Total: 36,516
  - Density: 17.435/km^{2} (45.156/sq mi)
  - Urban: 21.2%
  - Rural: 78.8%

Administrative structure
  - Inhabited localities: 1 cities/towns, 68 rural localities

Municipal structure
  - Municipally incorporated as: Laishevsky Municipal District
  - Municipal divisions: 1 urban settlements, 23 rural settlements
- Time zone: UTC+3 (MSK)
- OKTMO ID: 92634000
- Website: http://laishevo.tatarstan.ru/

Laishevsky District (Russian: Лаи́шевский райо́н; Tatar: Лаеш районы) – is a territorial administrative unit and municipal district of the Republic of Tatarstan within the Russian Federation. It is located in the western part of the republic at the confluence of the Volga and Kama rivers. The administrative center of the district is the city of Laishevo.

Laishevsky district was formed on February 14, 1927. It was incorporated into the Pestrechinsky District in 1963. Two years later it was reestablished as an administrative unit with its center in the city of Laishevo.

The area is often unofficially called the "Derzhavin Territory". It is named after one of Russia's most famous poets Gavrila Derzhavin.

== Geography ==
The Laishevsky district is located on the bank of the Kuybyshev Reservoir 62 km south-east of Kazan. The region covers an area of 2094.43 km^{2} and borders on Kazan, the Pestrechinsky District and Rybno-Slobodsky District. The district also shares borders with the Verkhneuslonsky, Kamsko-Ustinsky, Alekseevsky, and the Spassky districts along the water area of the Kuibyshevsky reservoir. Large rivers in the district are the Volga, Kama, and Myosha.

== Coat of arms and flag ==
The coat of arms of the Laishevsky district was developed on the basis of the historical coat of arms of the county town of Laishev of Kazan Governorate. It was approved by the decision of the representative body of the Laishevsky municipal district on December 8, 2005. There is a shield with images of silver waves on an azure background on the coat of arms. There is a golden plow and two red fish. Gold is a symbol of harvest and wealth, fish represents the fishing industry in the district. The flag of Laishevsky district is made on the basis of the coat of arms with the same images.

== History ==
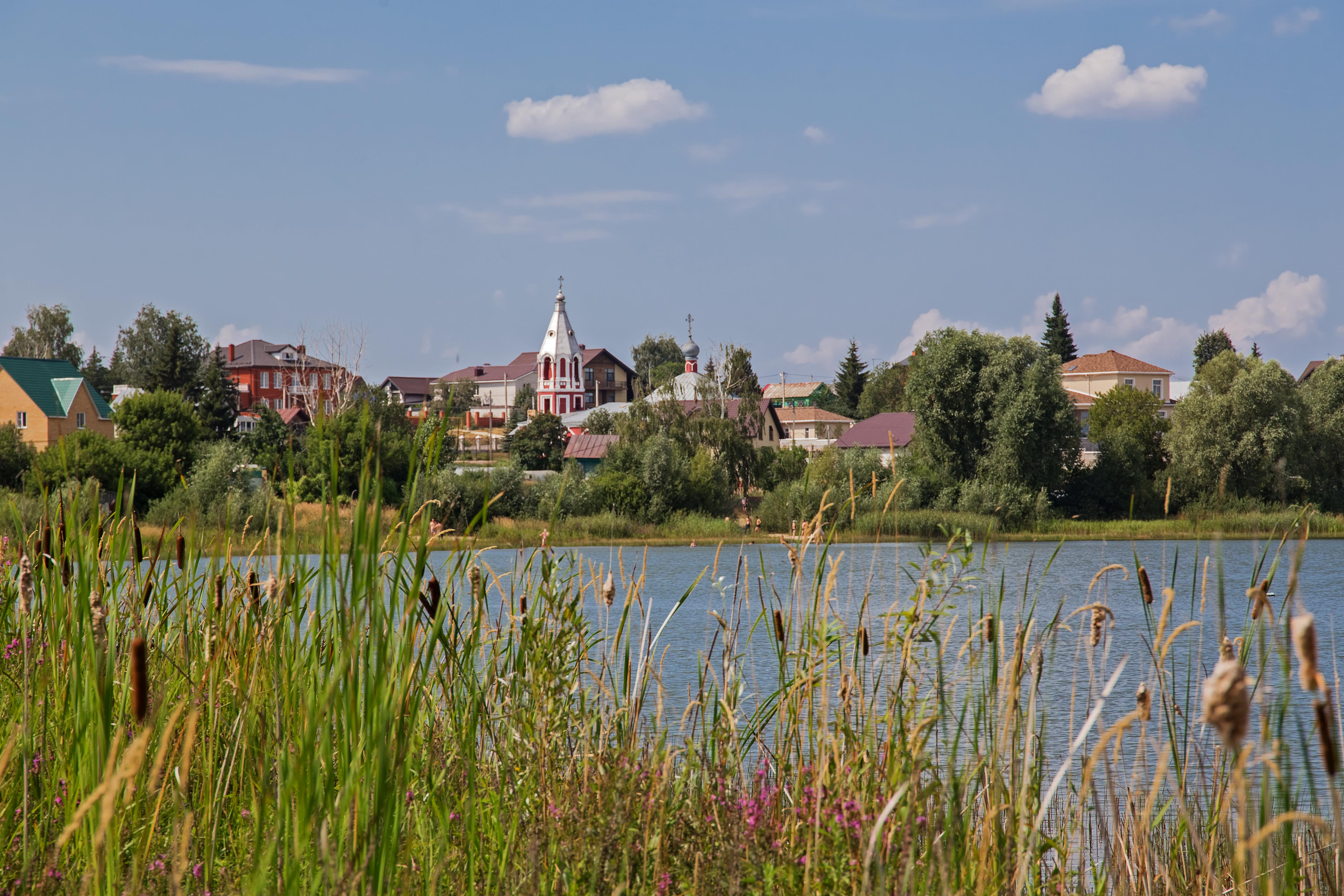
Church in Sand Kovaly

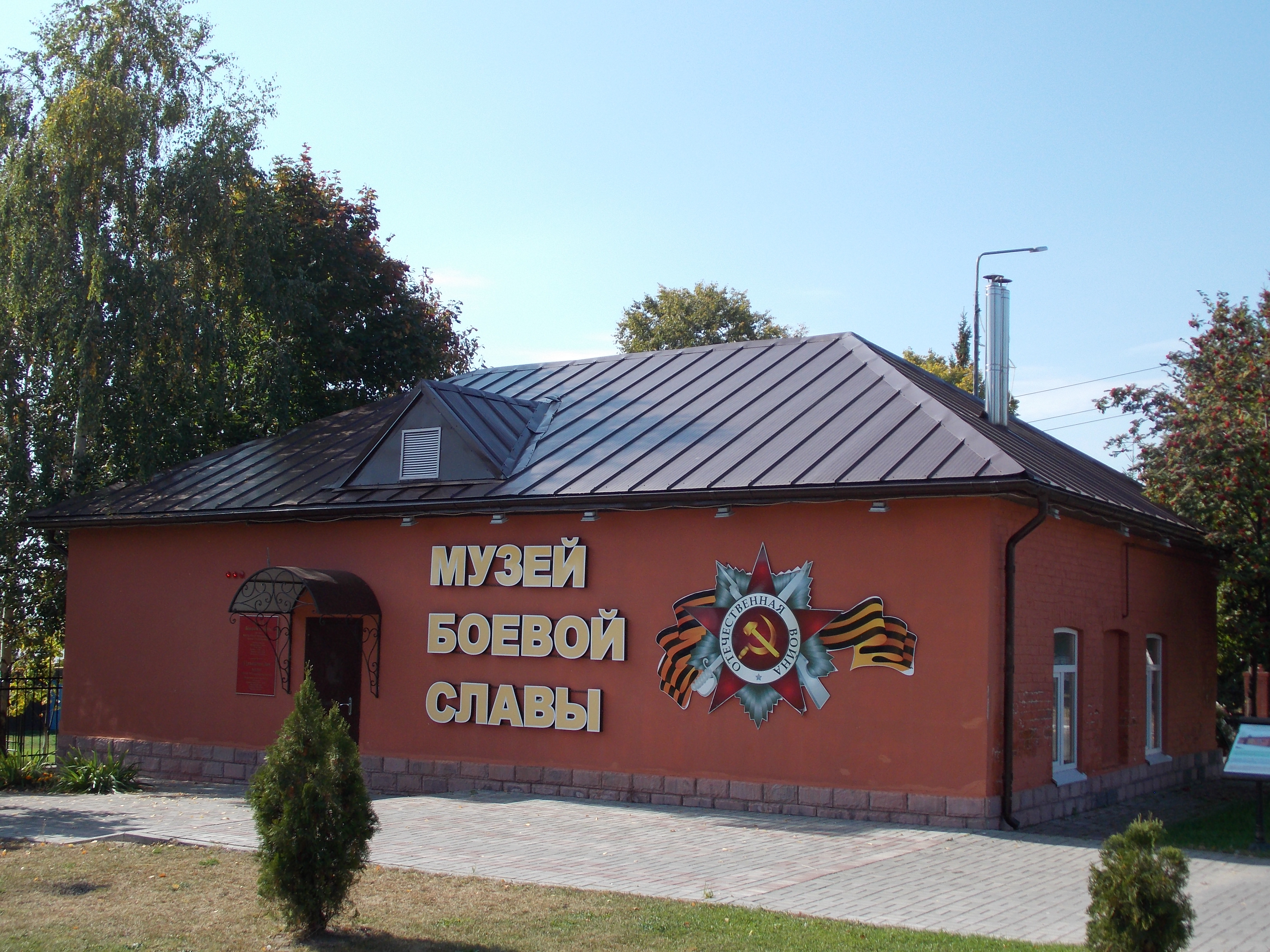
Museum in Laishevo

=== Etymology ===
The name of the region came from the ancient Tatar settlement of Laish according to the legend from the Nikon Chronicle. This ancient Tatar settlement of Laish in turn bore the name of its founder, the elder Laish from Bolgar.

=== 16-18th century ===
The city of Laishev was founded 62 km from Kazan as a fortress city in 1557. It was made for the protection of the crossing of the Kama River from attacks by the nogais and Mari people. The first inhabitants of the city were streltsy, gunners, and other military personnel. The wall of the Laishevsky prison had a length of about 500 meters with 6 towers and 582 arrowslits. By the 1650s the city had lost its military significance. Most of the personnel of the fortress had been withdrawn and the population was reduced.

Laishevo was a suburb of the Kazan province in 1708. Laishevo later received the status of a district town, becoming the fourth largest town in the Kazan province. Subsequently, people from all over the Laishevsky district were drawn to the Laishevo seeking work and the economy of the city began to develop. Iron Fairs were held in Laishevo, where cast iron, ironwork, and metal products had been sold since the beginning of the 19th century.

=== 19th-21st century ===
5,380 people lived in Laishevo at the end of the 19th century. There was an poorhouse, a two-year school, a hospital, a postal and telegraphy station, an orphan's court, a treasury, a women's gymnasium, and a parochial school in the city.

Laishevsky district was formed on February 14, 1927, among the first eight districts of the TASSR. At the same time, the Laishevsky, Sviyazhsky, and Tetyushsky cantons were abolished. The municipality included 40 village councils and 85 settlements, where 52,997 people already lived. Part of the territory passed to the Stolbishchensky district in August 1938. Several village councils were transferred to the Saltansky (from April 5, 1946 - Kornoukhovsky) district in 1944. The flooding of the reservoir of the Zhiguli Hydroelectric Station in 1956, submerged almost a third of the land in the Laishevsky district including villages, arable lands, and meadows. The Laishevsky district was incorporated into Pestrechinsky in 1963, but two years later it was reestablished as an independent administrative unit on January 12, 1965. Laishevo was included in the list of historical cities of Russia in 1990.

The boundaries of the district continues to change. Thus the Narmonskoye and Karaishevskoye rural settlements were united into the Narmon rural settlement by the regional law on June 9, 2010. The part of the lands of the Matyushinsky rural settlement of the Laishevsky district with an area of 63.2 hectares passed to Kazan on November 16, 2020. There are plans to build a sports complex "Biathlon" there.

Mikhail Pavlovich Afanasyev was the previous head of the district. Since 2020, this position has been occupied by Zaripov Ildus Fatikhovich. The executive committee is headed by Anatoly Novikov.

== Population ==
44,458 people live in the district according to records from 2019. According to the 2010 census 42.1% of the district's population are Tatars, 55.1%Russians, Chuvash people make up 1%. 19.73% of the district's population live in urban conditions.

== Municipal-territorial structure ==
There are 1 urban, 23 rural settlements, 1 city, and 68 settlements in Laishevsky district [37]. The administrative centers of rural settlements in the district are: Atabay, Chirpy, Derzhavino, Gabishevo, Hayirbey, Kaipy, Kurmanakovo, Kichi Kaban, Malaya Yelga, Matyushino, Narmonka, Nikolskoye, Oryol, Pelyovo, Peschanye Kovali, Rozhdestveno, Sokur, Sredneye Devyatovo, Stolbishe, Tashkermen, Tatar Saralan, Tatar Yantuk, Ulu Kaban, the city of Laishevo, and the October 25 Sovkhoz settlement.

== Economy ==
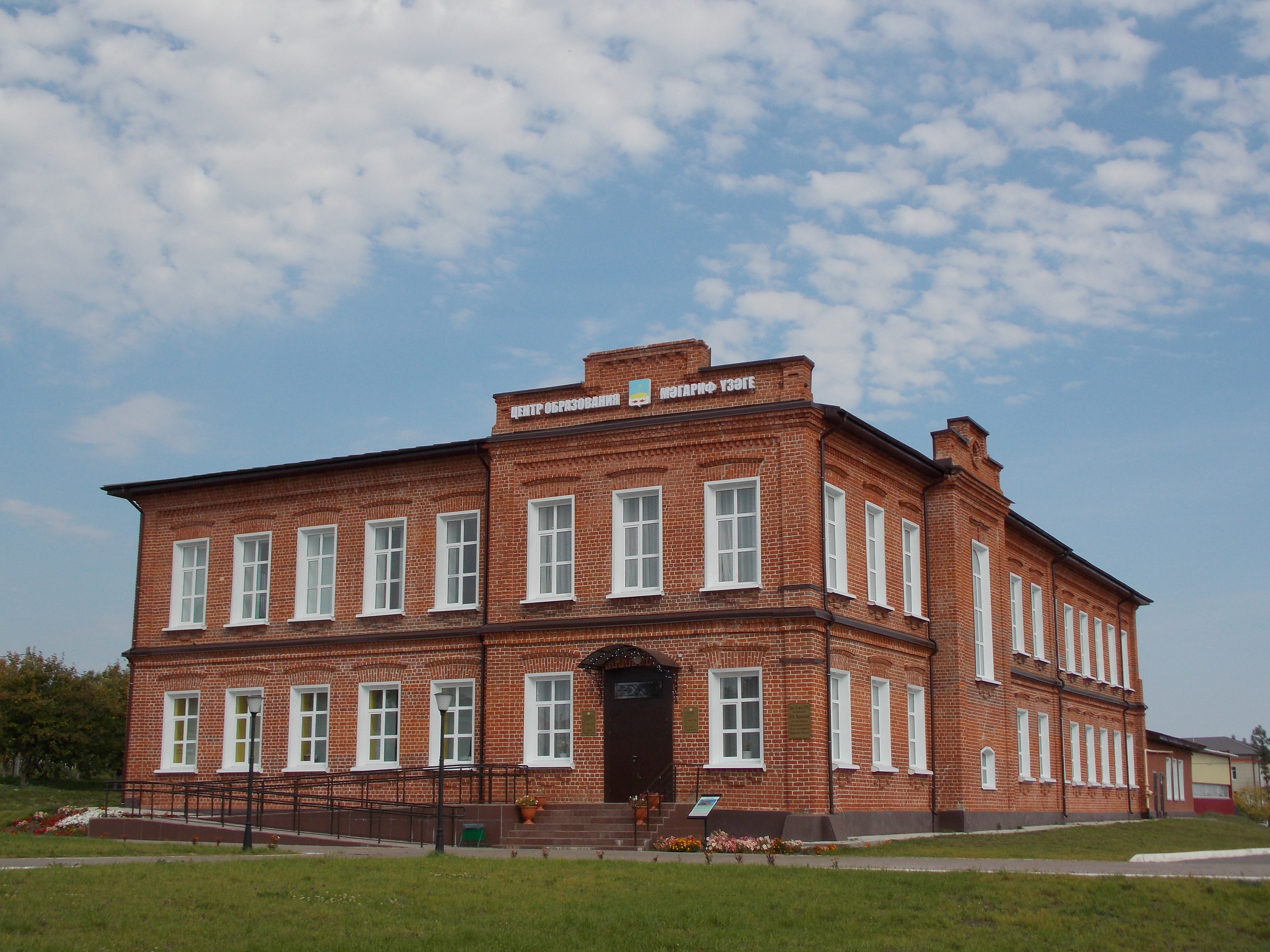
School in Laishevo

=== Business and High tech ===
Laishevsky district ranks 4th in national rankings in terms of quality of life among 43 districts in 2020. The average salary in Laishevo is 43.6 thousand rubles which is more than other municipalities.

There are 540 small and 10 medium-sized enterprises on the territory of the district, and 1274 individual entrepreneurs were registered in 2019. The share of small and medium-sized businesses in the gross regional product of the district was 28.6% in 2018.

The territory of the Laishevsky district has become a platform for the work of a number of branches of the capital organizations of Tatarstan and companies from other regions of Russia. This is due in large part to the proximity to Kazan and its developed transport infrastructure. The district is also home to numerous commercial entities such as the "Nefis" group of companies, the "Naukograd", the "Ozon" warehouse complex, the "ICL – KMECS" industrial electronics plant, the "Ak Bars Holding" poultry complex, the "Laishevsky" poultry complex, a dairy plant, a food processing plant, a fish factory, the agricultural company "Jubileynoe" and the "Kazan fat plant".

The revenue of agricultural enterprises in the region amounted to 5.5 billion rubles in 2019. The bulk of their income comes from the production of meat and poultry. Additional industries include beekeeping, spring wheat, rye, barley, oats, peas, and flax. The "Narmonka" company and the "Zolotoy Kolos" agricultural enterprise are among the large agricultural producers in the district. The "Laishevsky" poultry complex and the "Yaratel" poultry farm account for 80% of the eggs produced in Tatarstan.

=== Investment potential ===
The SEZ (Special economic zone) "Innopolis" was created in the village of Usady in 2018. The total area of "Innopolis" is 110 hectares. The main infrastructure facility is an eight-story technopark with an area of 12.4 km^{2} belonging to the ICL company. IBM, Leroy Merlin, Auchan, British Petroleum, and other companies located on the territory of "Innopolis".

The district's investment in fixed assets amounted to 12.5 billion rubles in 2019. It took third place in the integral rating of investment attractiveness of municipal districts and urban districts of Tatarstan. The rating assessed the volume of investments from Russian and foreign investors, the number of registered companies with foreign capital, as well as the effectiveness of promoting the investment potential of the republic's subjects.

Six industrial companies operate on the territory of the municipality supporting small and medium-sized businesses. Overall there were 32 commercial entities in the district with combined revenues amounting to more than 2.5 billion rubles in 2020. Two more industrial sites are under construction in the villages of Kirby and Derzhavino. There are plans to create another industrial zone "Smart City Kazan" by 2030. The largest and most successful investment projects from 2013 to 2019 were the project of the "KZSA" (Kazan plant of special vehicles) for the production of vans, caravans, and motorhomes, as well as "Tekhstroy" which converted a former carrot warehouse for the production of fittings and plastic pipe systems in the village of Narmonka. The industrial park "In Park" is in the processes of an expansion expected to be completed by 2021. The international concern "DoorHan" is investing about 1 billion rubles in this park.

Companies in these industrial zones invest not only in core activities, but in infrastructure development as well. Accordingly, the "PLC Group" plans to organize a scientific center to create oil filters which will create 70 jobs in the village of Sokury while "KMIZ Luch" is building cottages for employees in the village of Kirb.

=== Transport ===
Major highways in the district are the R-239 "Kazan - Orenburg - border with Kazakhstan", "Shali (M-7) - Sorochi Gory" (backup R-239 on the section from M-7 to Kama), and "R-239 - Laishevo", "R-239 - Matyushino", R-245 "R-239 - Airport". The "Kazan" international airport is in the north-west of the district. The district is served by the railway stations and platforms: Combinat, Usady, Stolbishe and Airport.

A section of the M12 highway connecting Moscow and Kazan is being designed in the district. It passes through the rural settlement of Yegoryevskoye and is planned to be opened by 2024.

== Ecology ==
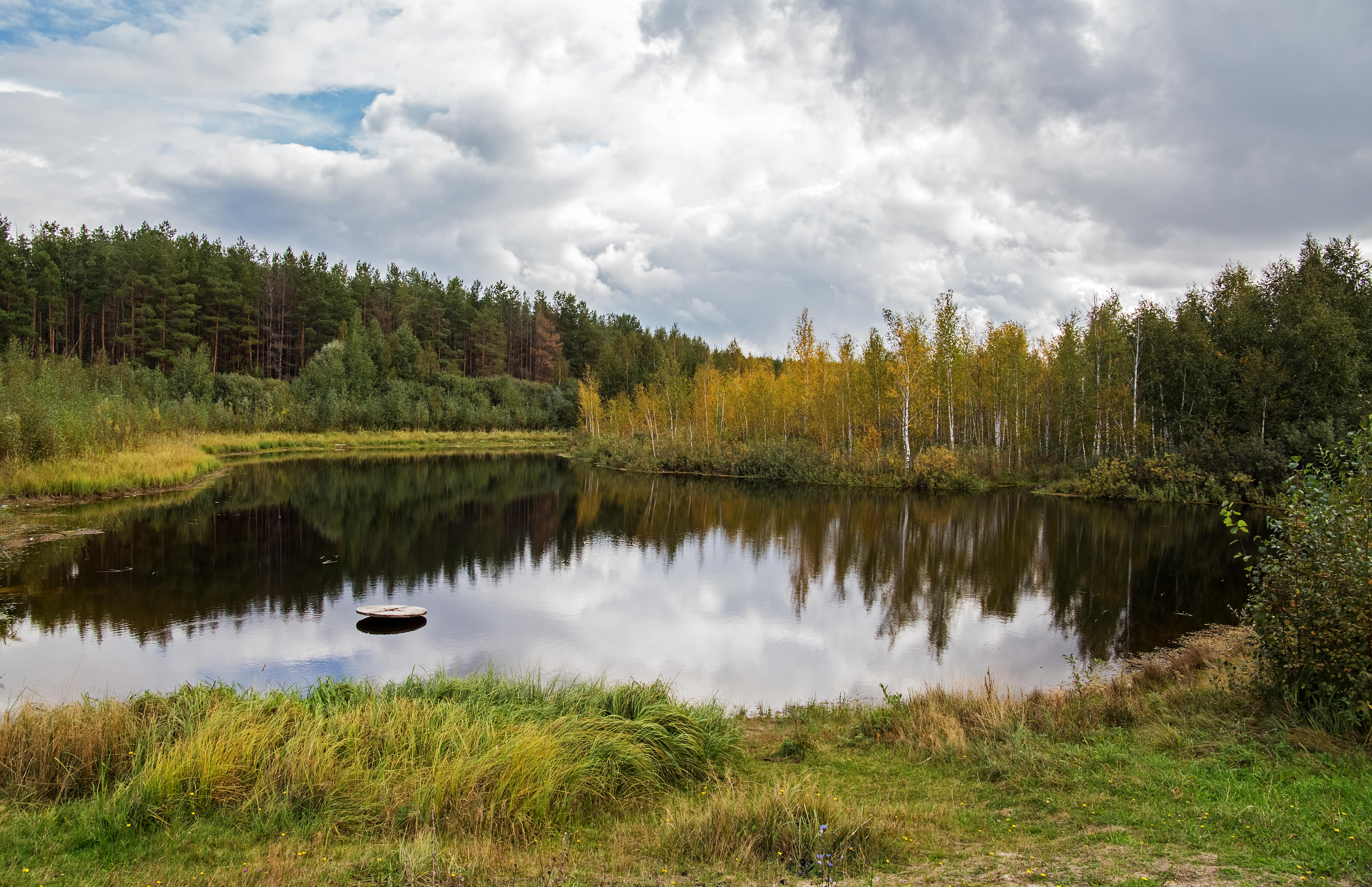
Lake Mokhovoe

The zakaznik with an area of 11,890 hectares was created in the district in 2018. The purpose of this park was to preserve a stable population of aquatic biological resources of the Mesha River. In addition, there are natural monuments that highlight exceptional features of the terrain in the district:

- Saralinsky section of the Volga-Kama Nature Reserve
- Zoological natural monument "Nesting colony of black-headed gulls"
- Lakes: Arkhiyereyskoye, Zayachie, Zimnitsa, Kirbi, Kovalenskoye, Lesnoye, Mokhovoye, Salamykovskoye, Sapugoli, Svezheye, Chornoye, Chistoye.

== Culture and Society ==
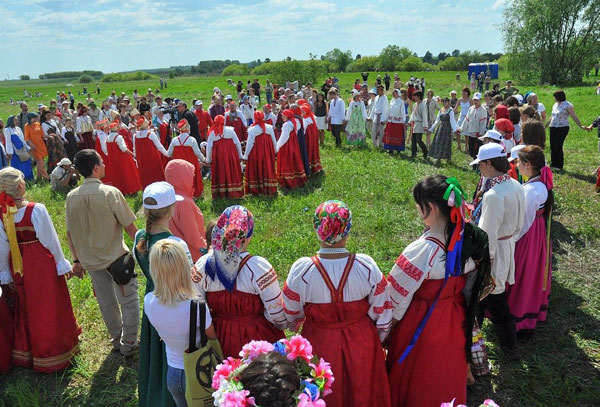
All-Russian festival of Russian folklore in the village of Nikolskoye

The district is served by 35 secondary schools and 26 libraries. Additionally the Laishevsky technical and economic college was opened in the district in 2020. The cultural resources of the district are represented by the Museum of the Laishevsky District, the House of Folk Art and the Museum of the History of the Festival "Karavon", which annually holds a major event in the village of Russkoye Nikolskoye. The regional newspaper "Kamskaya Nov" ("Kama Yagy") is published in Russian and Tatar languages.

The "Kamskoye More" sailing regatta is held annually in Laishevo. A new city beach with the same name was opened in 2017. The city is also the venue for a regular costume event in memory of the poet Gavriil Derzhavin, who was born in the village of Sokury.

Laishevo is known as the filming location for the TV-series "Zuleikha Opens Her Eyes" based on the book of the same name by Guzel Yakhina. A set-decoration "Semruk" was built on the banks of the Kama River in 2018. Instead of being destroyed the set was instead made into a tourist attraction after the release of the TV-series.
