= Taşkirmän =

Taşkirmän Ташкирмән
- selo
- Location within Tatarstan
- Country: Russia
- Region: Tatarstan
- District: Layış District

Population (2002)
  - Total: 554
- Time zone: UTC+3:00

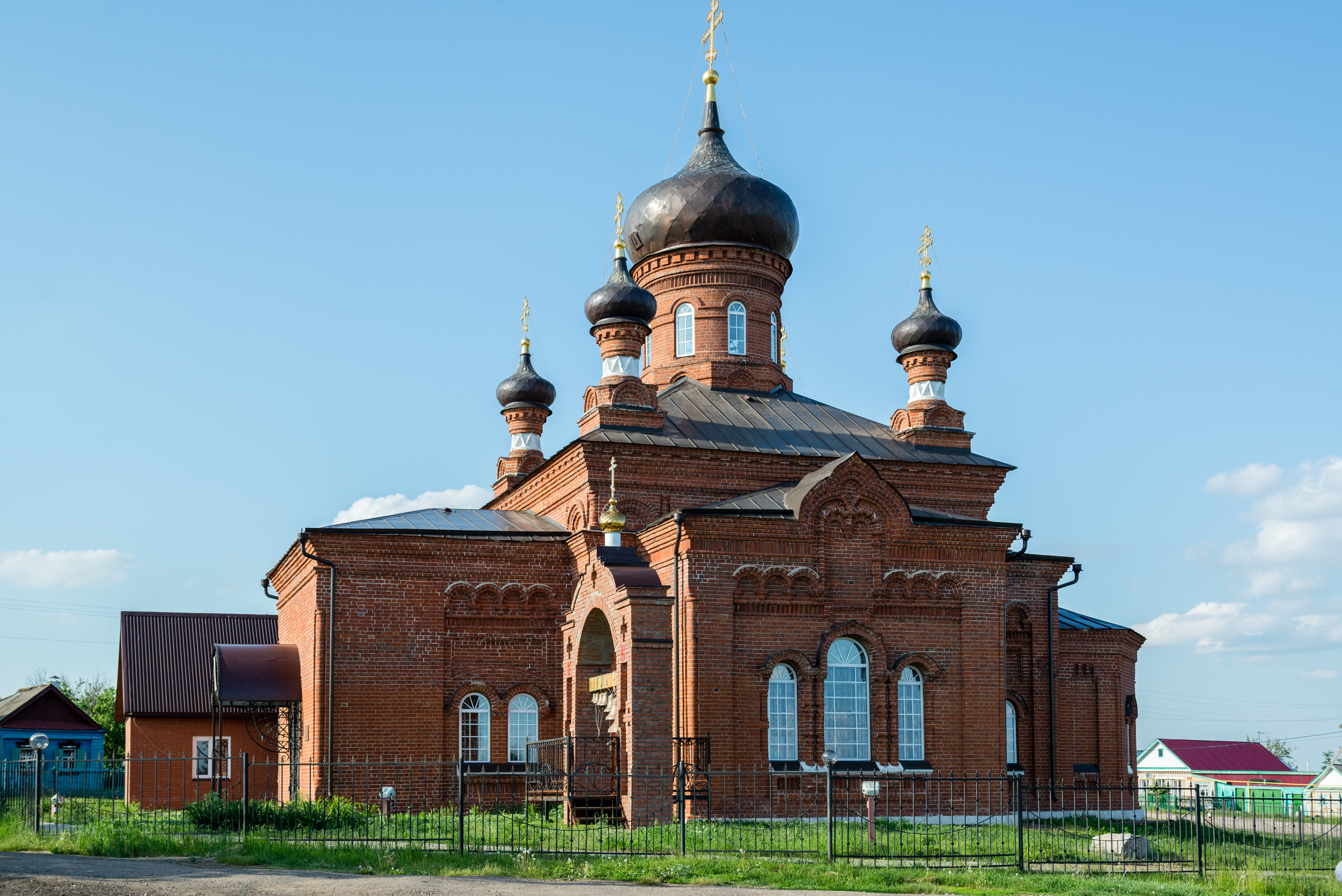
Tserkov' Svyatitelya Guriya Kazanskogo Церковь святителя Гурия Казанского

Taşkirmän (Tatar: Ташкирмән, romanized: Taşkirmän) is a rural locality (a selo) in Layış District, Tatarstan. The population was 530 as of 2010. Taşkirmän is located 91 km from Lаyış, district's administrative centre, and 65 km from Ԛazаn, republic's capital, by road. The village already existed during the period of the Qazan Khanate. There are 6 streets in the village.
