= Nurminkä =

Nurminkä Нурминкә
- selo
- Location within Tatarstan
- Country: Russia
- Region: Tatarstan
- District: Layış District

Population (2002)
  - Total: 1,846
- Time zone: UTC+3:00

Nurminkä (Tatar: Нурминкә, romanized: Nurminkä) is a rural locality (a selo) in Layış District, Tatarstan. The population was 1837 as of 2010. Nurminkä is located 67 km from Layış, district's administrative centre, and 38 km from Qazan, republic's capital, by road. The village already existed during the period of the Qazan Khanate. There are 13 streets in the village.
