= Medal "In Commemoration of the 1000th Anniversary of Kazan" =

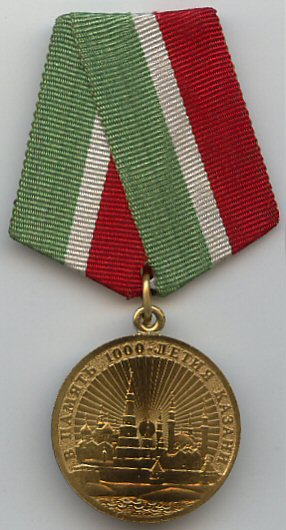
- Medal "In Commemoration of the 1000th Anniversary of Kazan" (obverse)
- Type: State Commemorative Medal
- Awarded for: World War 2 service and significant contribution to the development of the city
- Presented by: Russian Federation
- Eligibility: Kazan residents and other citizens of the Russian Federation
- Status: No longer awarded
- Established: July 30, 2005

Highlights
- Total: 250.000
- Ribbon of the Medal "In Commemoration of the 1000th Anniversary of Kazan"

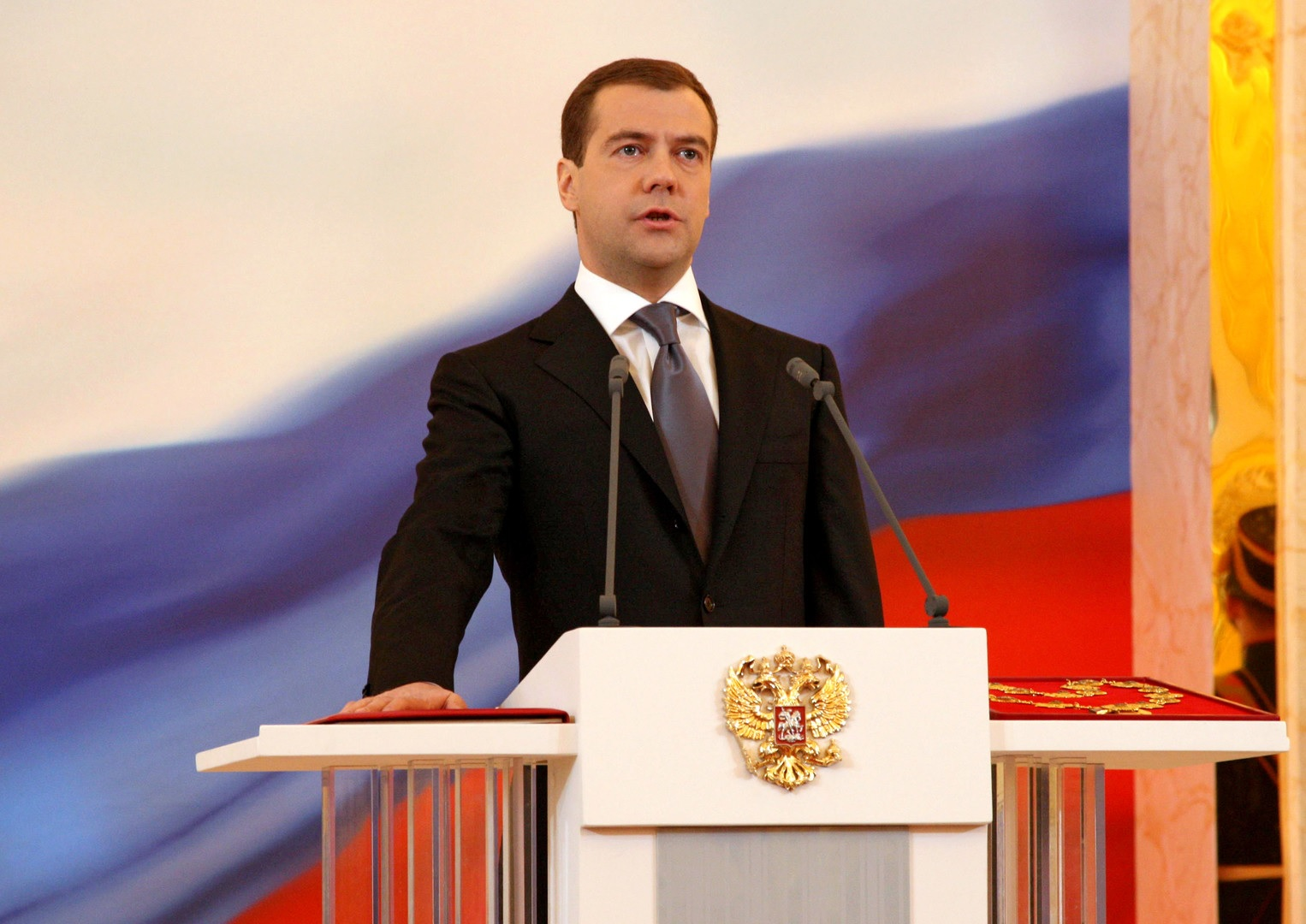
Former President Dmitry Medvedev, a recipient of the Medal

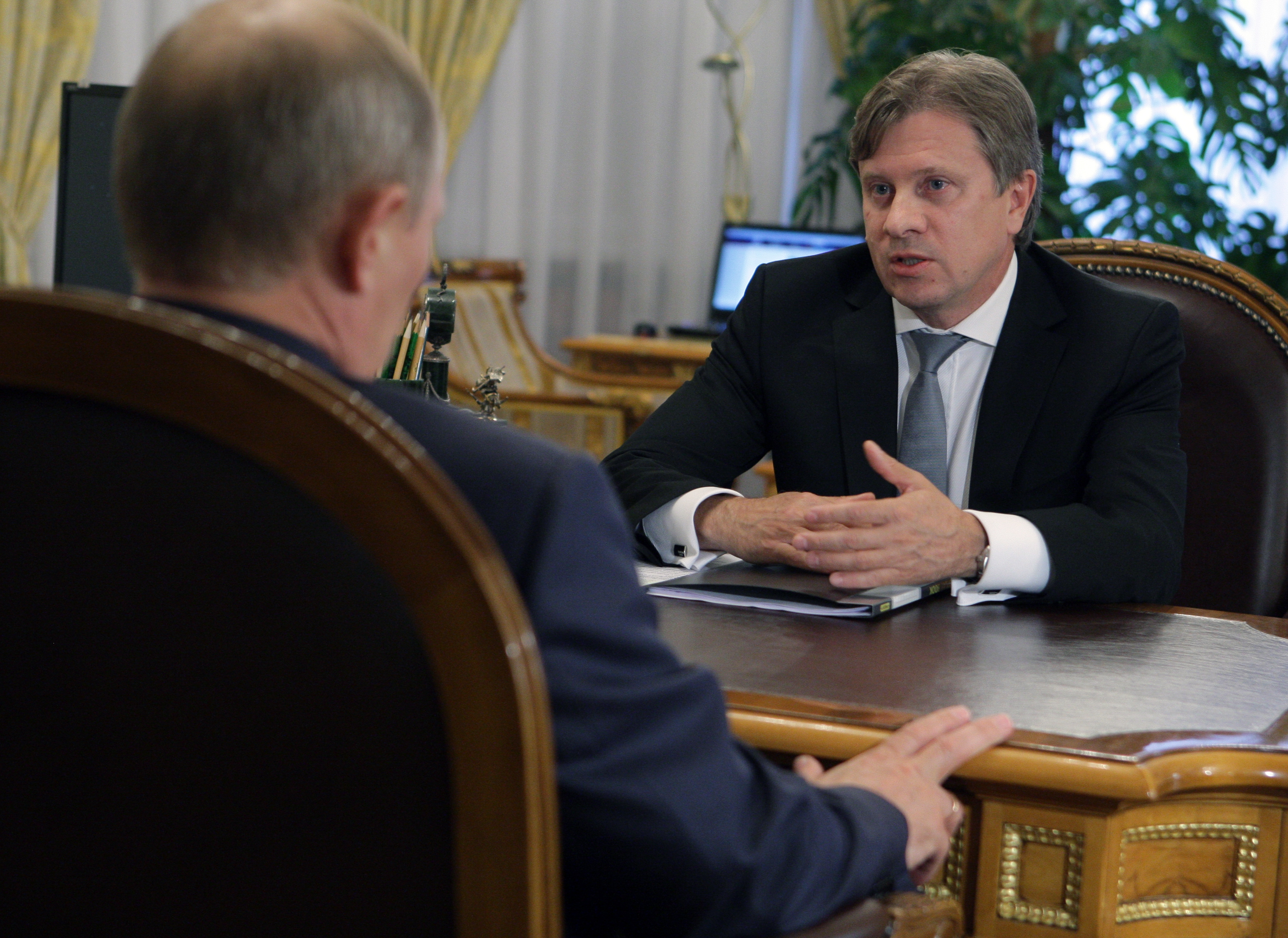
Aeroflot CEO Vitaly Saveliev, a recipient of the medal

The Medal "In Commemoration of the 1000th Anniversary of Kazan" (Russian: Медаль «В память 1000-летия Казани») is a state commemorative medal of the Russian Federation established on June 30, 2005, by Presidential Decree No. 762 to denote the 1000th anniversary of the foundation of Kazan, the capital city of Tatarstan.

== Medal statute ==
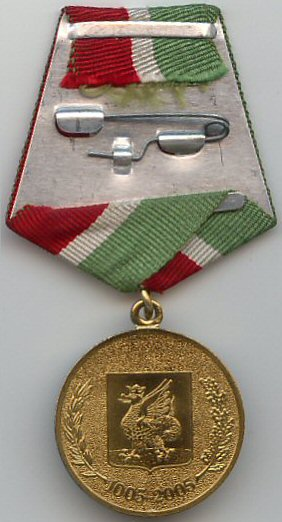
Reverse of the Medal 1000th Anniversary of Kazan

The Medal "In Commemoration of the 1000th Anniversary of Kazan" was awarded to Kazan residents who fought in the Great Patriotic War of 1941–1945, wartime workers who worked during the Great Patriotic War of 1941–1945 in the city of Kazan for at least six months or that were awarded orders and medals of the Soviet Union for their dedicated work in the Great Patriotic War of 1941 - 1945, to veterans of labour; and to other citizens who have made a significant contribution to the development of the city of Kazan.

Presidential Decree 1099 of September 7, 2010 removed the Medal "In Commemoration of the 1000th Anniversary of Kazan" from the list of state awards of the Russian Federation. It is no longer awarded.

== Medal description ==
The Medal "In Commemoration of the 1000th Anniversary of Kazan" is a 32 mm in diameter brass circular medal with raised rims on both sides. On its obverse, in relief, the image of the Kazan Kremlin under a rising sun with rays extending sideways and upwards, surrounded by the relief inscription along the medal circumference "In Commemoration of the 1000th Anniversary of Kazan" (Russian: "В память 1000-летия Казани"). On its reverse at center, the coat of arms of the city of Kazan, at the bottom the relief inscription "1005 - 2005", at left along the medal's circumference, a laurel branch going 3/4 of the way up, at right along the medal's circumference, an oak branch going 3/4 of the way up.

The medal is suspended by a ring through the award's suspension loop to a standard Russian pentagonal mount covered with a 24 mm wide overlapping tricolour silk moiré ribbon with a 10 mm wide green stripe on the left, a 4 mm wide white stripe in the center and a 10 mm wide red stripe on the right.

== Notable recipients (partial list) ==
The individuals listed below were awarded the Medal "In Commemoration of the 1000th Anniversary of Kazan".

- Former President of Russia Dmitry Anatolyevich Medvedev
- Lawyer and politician Nikolay Alexandrovich Vinnichenko
- Railway engineer, former chief engineer of the Ministry of Railways Dmitry Vladimirovich Gayev
- Assistant to the President of the Russian Federation Arkady Vladimirovich Dvorkovich
- Former head of the Republic of North Ossetia–Alania Alexander Sergeevich Dzasokhov
- Former President of Russia Boris Nikolayevich Yeltsin
- Head of the Kazan City Administration Kamil Shamilyevich Iskhakov
- Chairman of the Foreign Affairs Committee of the Federation Council of Russia Mikhail Vitalievich Margelov
- General and politician of Kazakh descent Rashid Gumarovich Nurgaliyev
- Director of the State Hermitage Museum in Saint Petersburg Mikhail Borisovich Piotrovsky
- Former Governor of the Sverdlovsk Oblast Eduard Ergartovich Rossel
- Director General and CEO of Aeroflot Vitaly Gennadyevich Savelyev
- Former President of the Chuvash Republic Nikolay Vasilyevich Fyodorov
- Rally raid driver Vladimir Gennadiyevich Chagin
- Politician and diplomat Sergey Vladimirovich Yastrzhembsky
- Journalist, Merited culture worker of Tatarstan Republic Rina Zaripova
- Historian, essayist and poet Igor Evgenevich Alekseev
- Prominent social and human rights activist Fauzia Bairamova Aukhadievna
- Deputy Minister of Transport of the Russian Federation Oleg Valentinovich Belozerov
- TV personality and member of the Presidium of the Council on Foreign and Defense Policy Sergei Borisovich Brilev
- Deputy Chairman of the Central Election Commission of Russia Stanislav Vladimirovich Vavilov
- Economist and Rector of the Kazan State Financial and Economic Institute Shamil Makhmutovich Valitov
- Chairman of the Heraldry Council under the President of the Russian Federation Georgii Vadimovich Vilinbakhov
- First Deputy General Director of the ITAR-TASS news agency Michael Solomonovich Guzman
- Politician, member of the Legislative Assembly of the Leningrad Oblast Vadim Anatol'evich Gustov
- Director General of the Russian National Library Vladimir Nikolaevich Zaitsev
- Politician, Minister of the Russian Federation Vladimir Yur'evich Zorin
- Director General of the ITAR-TASS news agency Vitaly Nikitich Ignatenko
- Politician, Deputy of the State Duma, Associate Professor of Political Science Andrey Konstantinovich Isayev
- Race driver, Honoured Master of Sports of Russia Firdaus Zaripovich Kabirov

== See also ==
- Awards and decorations of the Russian Federation
- City of Kazan
- Republic of Tatarstan
