= Dmitry Gayev =

Russian bureaucrat (1951–2012)

Dmitri Gayev
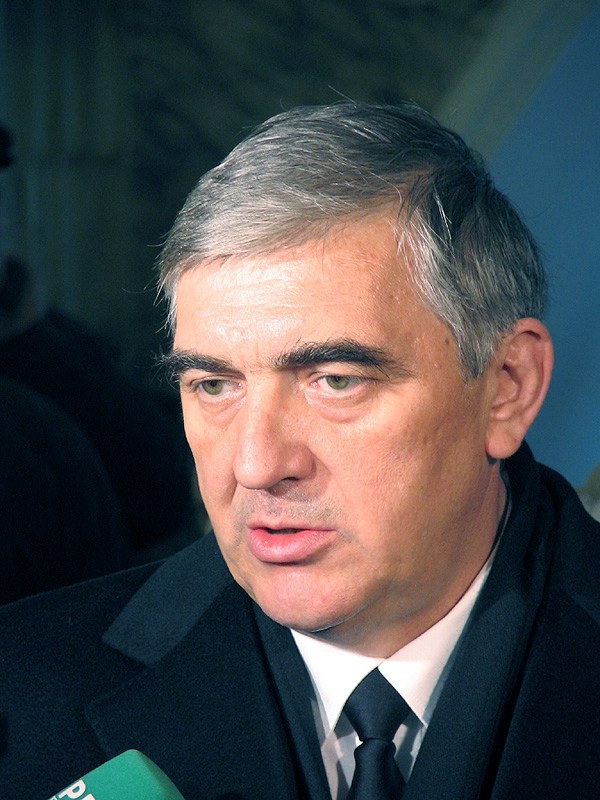

Personal details
- Born: 21 October 1951 Moscow, Russian SFSR, USSR
- Died: 27 October 2012 (aged 61) Zürich, Switzerland

Dmitry Vladimirovich Gayev (Russian: Дми́трий Влади́мирович Га́ев; 21 October 1951 – 27 October 2012) was a Russian civil servant and head chief of the Moscow Metro. He is known as having served the longest administrative mandate in the history of the Moscow Metro (from late 1995 until early 2011) under the command of Mayor Yuri Luzhkov. He was removed from this position after Luzhkov's removal and soon enough became the target of numerous financial and criminal lawsuits by the state relating to his work. Gayev retired in late 2011 because of a numbing weakness, has been diagnosed with brain cancer, and died on 27 October 2012.

== Biography ==
In 1973 he graduated from the Moscow Institute of Railway Engineers in 1986 - the Moscow Institute of Management, and in 1989 - the Higher Party School.

From 1981 to 1982 was chief engineer of Ministry of Railways.

In 1982 he became an instructor Sokolniki district committee of the CPSU since 1986 - an instructor and consultant for the Moscow city committee of the CPSU.

From 1990 to 1995 he worked as first deputy head of the Moscow Metro. On 25 December 1995 he was appointed head of the Moscow Metro.

Since 2001 Gayev is the general designer of the project "Muscovite's Social Card. It was approved for the position according to the order of the Moscow City Government 585-RP, dated 29 December 2001.

In 2002, Gayev was elected chairman of the Assembly of Metro International Union of Public Transport. He left in 2011.

== Honours and awards ==
- Order For Merit to the Fatherland 3rd class
- Order For Merit to the Fatherland 4th class
- Order of Honour
- Medal "In Commemoration of the 850th Anniversary of Moscow"
- Medal "In Commemoration of the 1000th Anniversary of Kazan"
