= Mamadyshsky Uyezd =

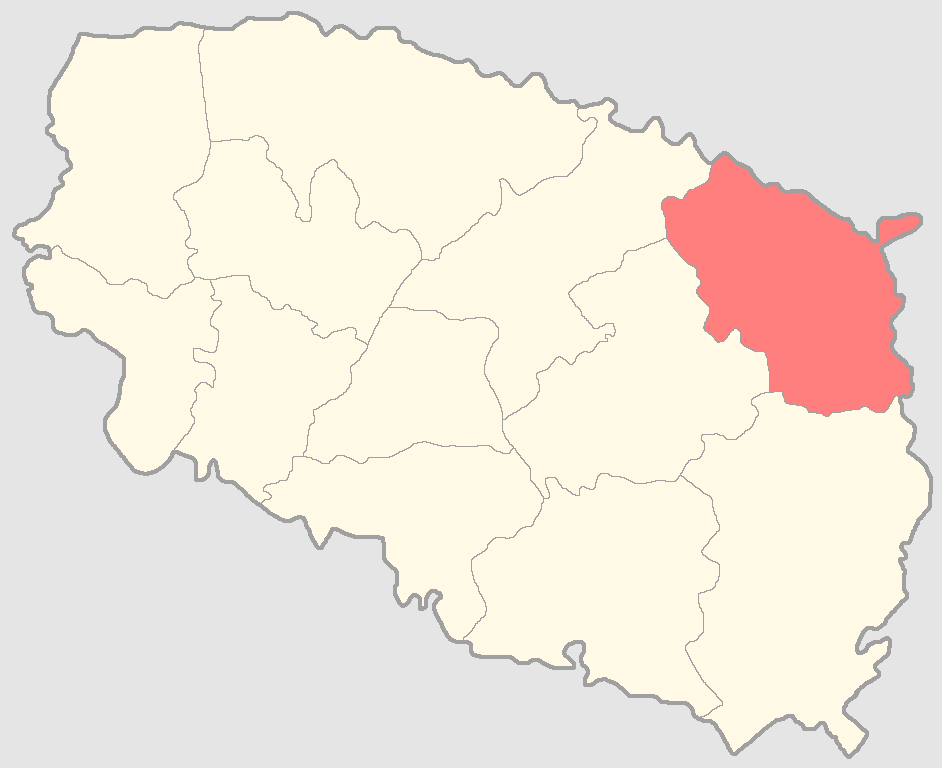
Mamadysh district on the map of Kazan province

Mamadyshsky Uyezd (Мамады́шский уе́зд) was one of the subdivisions of the Kazan Governorate of the Russian Empire. It was situated in the northeastern part of the governorate. Its administrative centre was Mamadysh.

== Demographics ==
At the time of the Russian Empire Census of 1897, Mamadyshsky Uyezd had a population of 189,795. Of these, 69.4% spoke Tatar, 25.1% Russian, 4.4% Udmurt and 1.0% Mari as their native language.
