= Kozmodemyansky Uyezd =

Subdivision of the Kazan Governorate

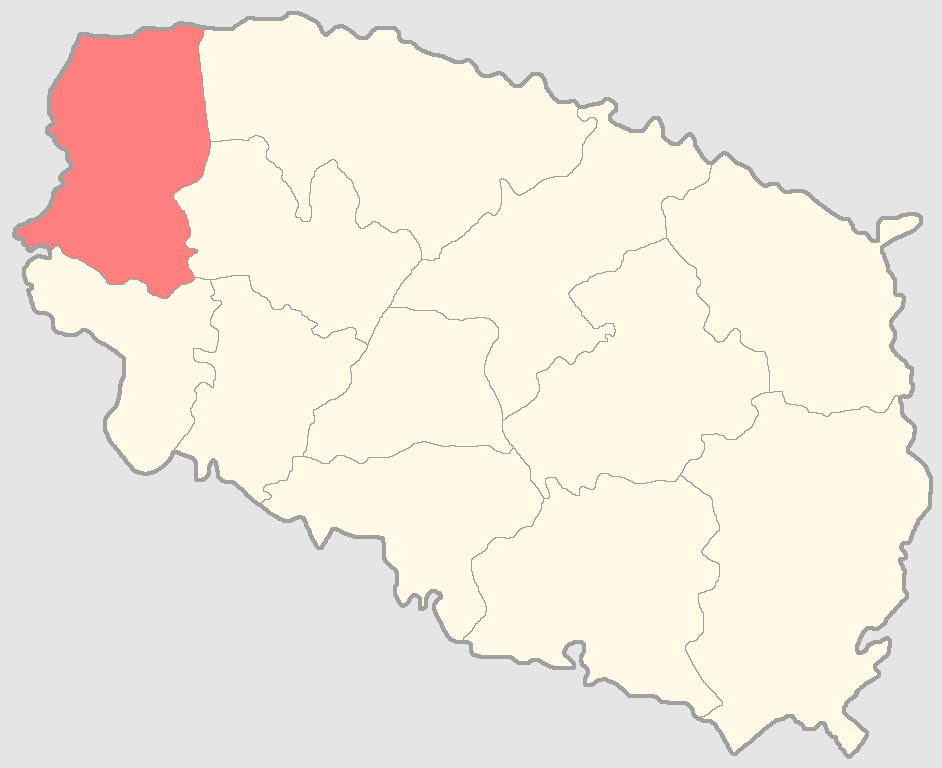
Location of Kozmodemyansky Uyezd (red) within the Kazan Governorate

Kozmodemyansky Uyezd (Козьмодемья́нский уе́зд) was one of the subdivisions of the Kazan Governorate of the Russian Empire. It was situated in the northwestern part of the governorate. Its administrative centre was Kozmodemyansk.

== Demographics ==
At the time of the Russian Empire Census of 1897, Kozmodemyansky Uyezd had a population of 105,633. Of these, 47.3% spoke Chuvash, 36.3% Mari and 16.3% Russian as their native language.
