= Laishevsky Uyezd =

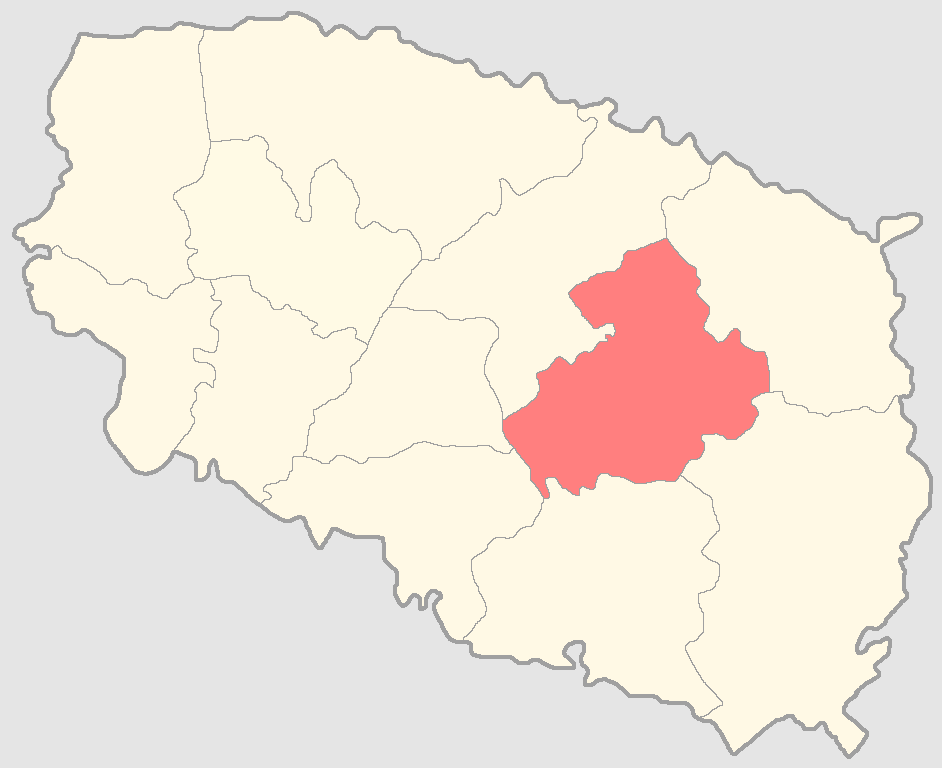
Laishevsky district on the map of Kazan province

Laishevsky Uyezd (Лаи́шевский уе́зд) was one of the subdivisions of the Kazan Governorate of the Russian Empire. It was situated in the eastern part of the governorate. Its administrative centre was Laishevo.

== Demographics ==
At the time of the Russian Empire Census of 1897, Laishevsky Uyezd had a population of 172,460. Of these, 57.5% spoke Russian, 42.4% Tatar and 0.1% Chuvash as their native language.
