= Xäyerbi =

Xäyerbi Хәерби, Кирби
- selo
- Location within Tatarstan
- Country: Russia
- Region: Tatarstan
- District: Layış District

Population (2022)
  - Total: 828
- Time zone: UTC+3:00

Xäyerbi (Tatar: Хәерби, romanized: Xäyerbi, Russian: Кирби, romanized: Kirbi) is a rural locality (a selo) in Layış District, Tatarstan. The population was 789 as of 2010. Xäyerbi is located 35 km from Layış, district's administrative centre, and 35 km from Qazan, republic's capital, by road. The village already existed during the period of the Qazan Khanate. There are 20 streets in the village.
