= Keçe Yılğa =

Keçe Yılğa Кече Елга
- selo
- Location within Tatarstan
- Country: Russia
- Region: Tatarstan
- District: Layış District

Population (2017)
  - Total: 712
- Time zone: UTC+3:00

Keçe Yılğa (Tatar: Кече Елга, romanized: Keçe Yılğa) is a rural locality (a selo) in Layış District, Tatarstan. The population was 710 as of 2010. Keçe Yılğa is located 25 km from Lаyış, district's administrative centre, and 67 km from Qazаn, republic's capital, by road. The earliest known record of the settlement dates from 1617. There are 12 streets in the village.
