= Meñnär =

Meñnär Меңнәр Минниярово
- Selo
- Location within Tatarstan Location within Russia
- Coordinates: 55°33′N 54°01′E
- Country: Russia
- Region: Tatarstan
- District: Aktanyshsky District
- Time zone: UTC+3:00

Meñnär (Tatar: Меңнәр, Russian: Миннярово) is a village in Aktanyshsky District, Tatarstan Republic, Russian Federation. It is located on the left bank of the Sun River, 17 km south of Aktanysh and 310 km east of Kazan.

As of 2010, the village has a population of 267 people.

The time zone is UTC+3. The postal code is 423744.

The village has a library. On May 11, 2015, a monument to the veterans of the Great Patriotic War was erected. As of 2015, the village library had 360 readers.

The climate is temperate continental. Köppen-Geiger Climate Classification Climate Code is Dfb. The average annual air temperature is 3.7 °C.

== School ==
Before the revolution of 1917 and in the following years, there was no public school in the village. But the village mullahs, the hazrats organized the children's education well enough for their time.

On September 1, 1928, a four-year primary school was opened in the village. His first teacher was Adasheva Hadicha. The school was located in the south-western part of the village, on the outskirts.

In 1939, the school was transformed into a Seven-year school. A dismantled mosque was used as the main building, and the second houses of the village's notable residents were used as the primary school building. The first principal of the school was Musin.

In 1954, the school introduced labor-based education, which led to the introduction of chicken and livestock breeding.

In 1967, eight years of education began in the new stone building.

== Famous people ==
- Khamit Basyrov, Honored Meliorator of the Republic of Tatarstan.
- Nail Ganiev, a journalist, head of the department of the newspaper "Şähri Qazan".
- Gulnaz Latipova, an artist of the Tuymazinsky Tatar State Drama Theater, Honored Artist of Bashkortostan.
- Rina Zaripova (1941-2008), Tatar journalist, Honored Worker of Culture of the Republic of Tatarstan.

== Sources ==
- Ф. Муратов, Й. Хуҗин (2003). Актаныш - туган җирем. Казан, Татарстан: Идел-Пресс. p. 65.
- "Миннярово". Каталог топонимов Республики Татарстан. Академия наук РТ.
