= Spassky Uyezd (Kazan Governorate) =

Subdivision in Kazan Governorate

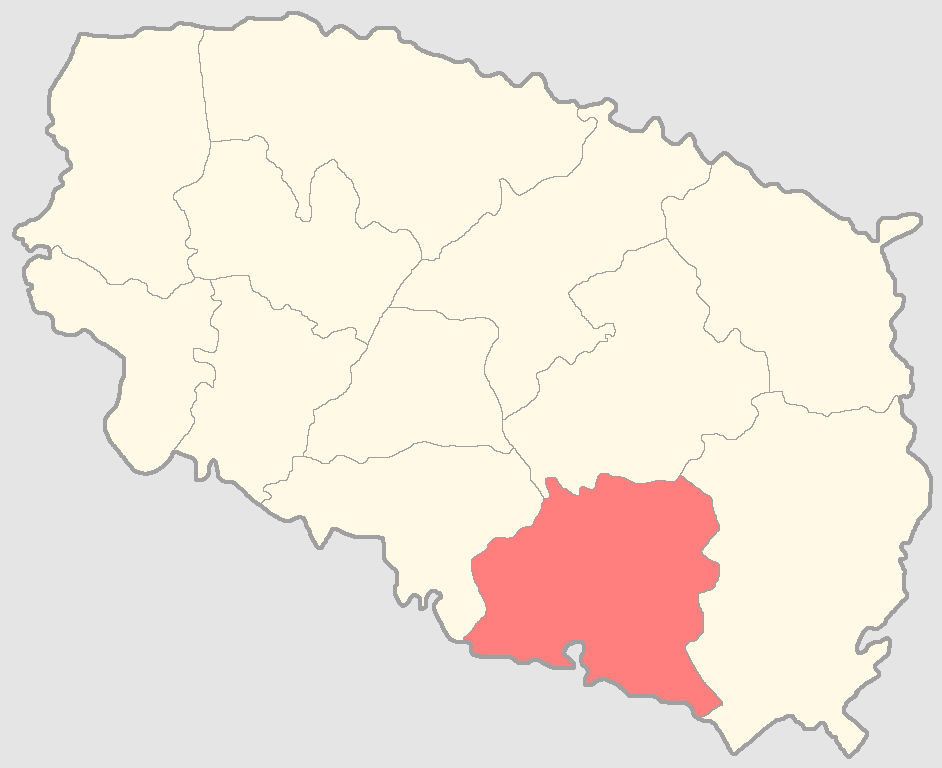
Spassky District on the map of Kazan Governorate

Spassky Uyezd (Спа́сский уе́зд) was one of the subdivisions of the Kazan Governorate of the Russian Empire. It was situated in the southeastern part of the governorate. Its administrative centre was Spassk (Bolgar).

== Demographics ==
At the time of the Russian Empire Census of 1897, Spassky Uyezd had a population of 175,198. Of these, 58.4% spoke Russian, 30.2% Tatar, 7.2% Chuvash and 4.1% Mordvin as their native language.
