= Kazan Governorate =

1708–1920 unit of Russia

Coordinates: 55.7908°N 49.1144°E

Kazan Governorate Казанская губерния (Russian)
- Governorate of the Russian Empire
- 1708–1920
- Coat of arms

- Location in the Russian Empire
- Capital: Kazan
- Area
- 63,618 km^{2} (24,563 sq mi)
- Population
  - 1913: 2,850,000
- History
  - Established: 1708
  - Disestablished: 1920
Preceded by
Kazan Viceroyalty
Succeeded by
Tatar ASSR
Chuvash Autonomous Oblast
Kazan Soviet Workers' and Peasants' Republic

Kazan Governorate (Note: Russian: Каза́нская губе́рния, romanized: Kazanskaya guberniya; Tatar: Казан губернасы; Chuvash: Хусан кӗперниӗ; Meadow Mari: Озаҥ губерний) was an administrative-territorial unit (guberniya) of the Tsardom of Russia, the Russian Empire, and the Russian SFSR from 1708 to 1920, with its capital in Kazan.

== History ==
Kazan Governorate, together with seven other governorates, was established on December 29 [O.S. December 18], 1708, by Tsar Peter the Great's edict on the lands of the Khanates of Kazan, Sibir, and Astrakhan, with addition of some lands from the Nogai Horde. These were the areas historically governed by the Kazan Palace's Prikaz. As with the rest of the governorates, neither the borders nor internal subdivisions of Kazan Governorate were defined; instead, the territory was defined as a set of cities and the lands adjacent to those cities.

In 1717, Astrakhan Governorate was separated from Kazan Governorate; in 1719—Nizhny Novgorod; in 1744—Orenburg; in 1781—Vyatka, Simbirsk, and Ufa Governorates were separated. Under Catherine the Great (1781–1796) Kazan was the center of a namestnichestvo (viceroyalty), with Kazan, Penza, and Saratov Governorates as its integral parts.

At first the governorate was divided into lots (доли, doli), then into provinces (провинции, provintsii) in 1719, and into uyezds (уезды) in 1775. Prior to 1796, there were Kazan, Kozmodemyansk, Laishev, Mamadysh, Sviyazhsk, Spassk, Tetyushi, Tsaryovokokshaysk, Tsivilsk, Cheboksary, Chistopol, and Yadrin uyezds.

In 1913, the area of the governorate comprised 55,900 square versts, its population was estimated at 2.85 million (38.9% Russians, 31.2% Tatars, 22.8% Chuvash, 5.1% Mari, 1.2% Mordva). There were 7,272 settlements, including 13 towns: Kazan, Arsk, Sviyazhsk, Kozmodemyansk, Laishev, Mamadysh, Spassk, Tetyushi, Tsaryovokokshaysk, Tsivilsk, Cheboksary, Chistopol, Yadrin; and two posads: Mariinsky Posad and Troitsky Posad.

The governorate was finally abolished during the Bolshevik administrative reform (see Idel-Ural State). Thereupon its Eastern part was proclaimed the Tatar ASSR, while the Western part was eventually divided between Chuvashia and Mari El.

== Administrative division ==
Kazan Governorate consisted of the following uyezds (administrative centres in parentheses):

- Kazansky Uyezd (Kazan)
- Kozmodemyansky Uyezd (Kozmodemyansk)
- Laishevsky Uyezd (Laishevo)
- Mamadyshsky Uyezd (Mamadysh)
- Sviyazhsky Uyezd (Sviyazhsk)
- Spassky Uyezd (Spassk)
- Tetyushsky Uyezd (Tetyushi)
- Tsaryovokokshaysky Uyezd (Tsaryovokokshaysk)
- Tsivilsky Uyezd (Tsivilsk)
- Cheboksarsky Uyezd (Cheboksary)
- Chistopolsky Uyezd (Chistopol)
- Yadrinsky Uyezd (Yadrin)

== Demographics ==
Population by spoken language in Kazan Governorate (1897)
Language	Native speakers	Percentage
Russian	832,475	38.3%
Tatar	675,419	31.1%
Chuvash	502,042	23.1%
Mari	122,717	5.6%
Mordvin	22,187	1.0%
Udmurt	9,679	0.4%
Polish	1,700	0.07%
Yiddish	1,381	0.06%
German	1,155	0.05%
Other languages	1.910	0.08%
Total	2,170,665	100.00
