= Elabuga Institute (branch) of KFU =

Coordinates: 56.2636°N 52.1338°E

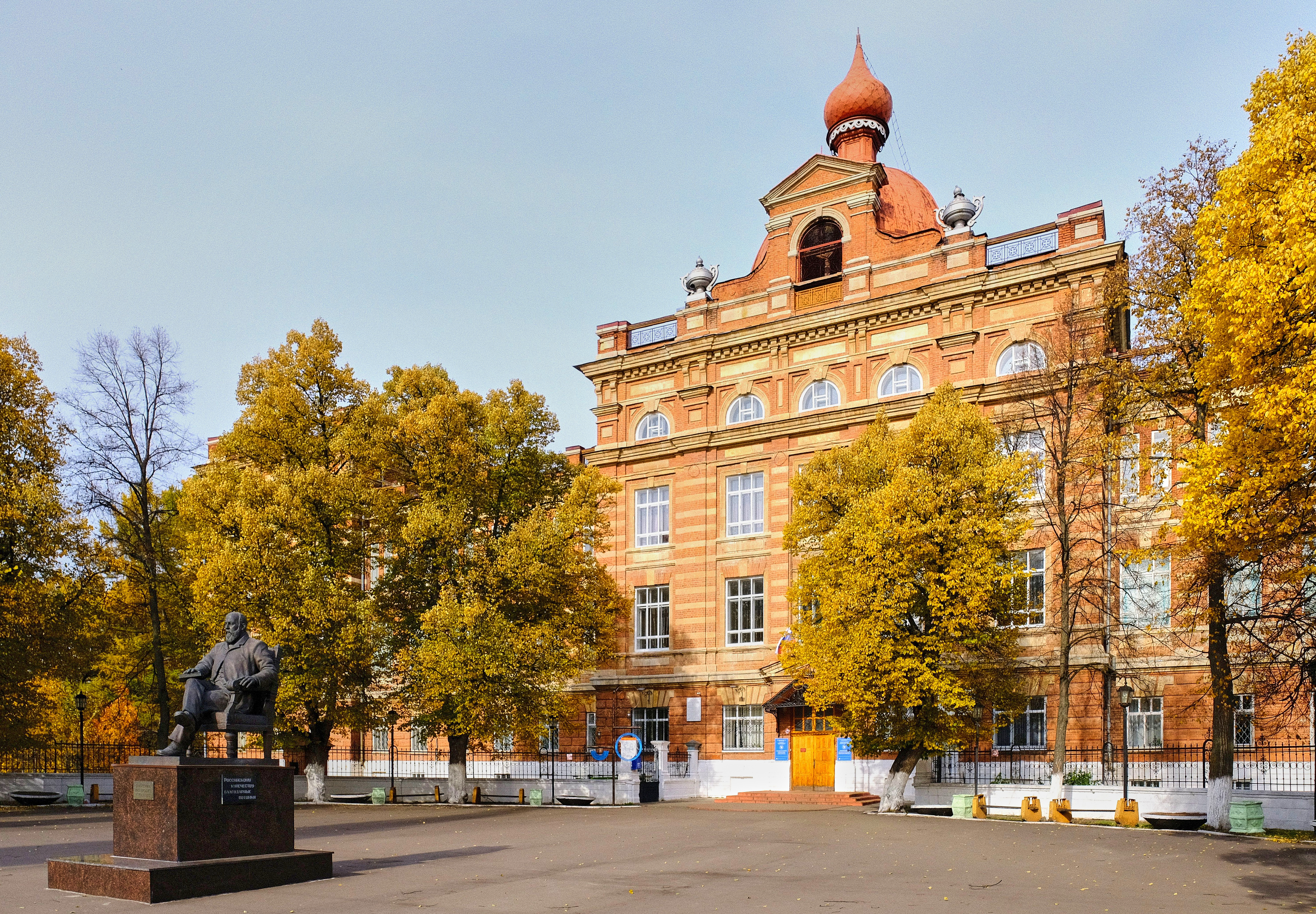
Elabuga Institute

Elabuga Institute (also spelled "Yelabuga"), a branch of Kazan Federal University, is a state educational institution of higher professional education of the Russian Federation.

== History ==
Elabuga Institute of KFU was established on the foundation of Elabuga State Pedagogical University in 2011.

Its history goes back to the 19th century and can be divided into the pre-Soviet time period, the Soviet time period, and the modern period.

=== Pre-Soviet period ===
A new educational institution was established in Vaytskaya Province in 1898. The Elabuga merchant Glafira F. Stakheeva subscribed to the building of the Diocesan School for Girls in memory of her husband.

Thinking about the needs of the Orthodox clergy of the Prikamskiy Territory I made up my mind to try and solicit for a theological seminary to be established in Elabuga since it is a main town for 5 districts and 3 provinces – Vaytskaya Province, Ufa Province, and Kazan Province....

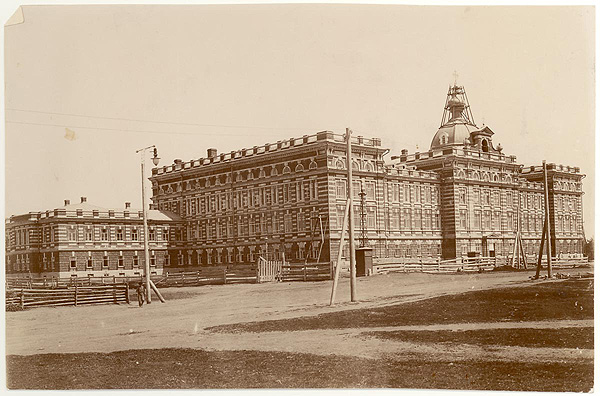
The building of the Eparchy School. 1890th

The idea of G. F. Stakheeva, in general, received the approval of the Eparchy Assembly, nevertheless the Holy Synod gave permission for the foundation not of a seminary but of the Eparchy School for girls. The building was designed by a first grade architect of the Vyatka province I. A. Charushin. The building was constructed by an architect and artist A. I. Gorokhov. The construction of the building lasted for four years and was finished by August 15, 1903.

The girls of the Eparchy School were taught the basic sciences, religion, etiquette, foreign languages and music. After graduation girls received the status of a home teacher. Attendance of extra classes of the departments of history, physics and mathematics allowed the graduates to become Church school teachers or Eparchy school teachers. Before the October Revolution the Eparchy School has prepared several hundreds of teachers.

=== Soviet period ===
In 1918, the Eparchy School was closed, the same year the Tatar teacher's seminary was opened here. Later, by the decision of the People's Commissariat, Yelabuga Tatar teachers' seminary was transformed into a three-year teacher training courses for the representatives of different national and ethnic groups. Since that time the Russian as well as Mari, Udmurt and Tatar pedagogical courses functioned there.

In August 1923 the Board of Tatar pedagogical courses renamed them into Yelabuga Tatar Pedagogical College. In 1930 it became the Russian-Tatar Pedagogical College (Tekhnicum).

Simultaneously primary school teachers were trained in the college where in 1931–1932 correspondence department was opened. In 1935 a library department was established within the college which later (in 1937) separated as an independent school. In 1936–1937 Yelabuga Tatar Pedagogical College was transformed into the Teacher Training College.

In 1939, according to the Decree of the USSR Government the Teachers' Training Institute was founded on the basis of the former Pedagogical College aimed at preparation of qualified middle school teachers. The students from the nearest 12 districts of the Udmurt and Tatar ASSR were admitted into four faculties: history, physics and mathematics, philology, natural geography.

During World War II, Voronezh University, some laboratories of Leningrad University as well as a branch of the Academy of Sciences of the USSR were evacuated to Yelabuga. They all were housed in the building of Yelabuga Teachers' Training Institute. 22 professors, 25 associate professors worked at the institute during the war.

During the post war years the teachers' institutes lost their value in connection with a broad development of secondary education and increase of requirements to the level of teachers' qualification. The Elabuga state teacher training institute was formed on the basis of the Elabuga teachers' institute by the resolution of Council of Ministers of RSFSR of August 19, 1952.

Since April 1, 1953, the enrollment of students on two faculties was announced: physical-mathematical and philological. 150 students were accepted for the first course. The next year the correspondence department was opened where 200 students were accepted. The institute formed the new faculties: pedagogics and techniques of primary education (1959), foreign languages (1965), technical (1975).

Since December, 1973 the 8-month preparatory department was opened at the institute, the main objective of which consisted in preparation working and rural youth for admission to the institute.

In 1982, for achievements in teacher training ESTI was handed the challenge Red Banner of the Ministry of Education of the USSR and the Central Committee of trade union educators, higher education and research institutions.

=== Present ===
In 2003 the higher educational institution received the new status and was transformed to the Elabuga state pedagogical university.

The structure of university included 2 institutes (the Institute of additional professional education and the Institute of technology, economy and service), 9 faculties (history and law, Russian philology and journalism, physical and mathematical, foreign languages, Tatar and comparative philology, biological, psychology and pedagogics, physical culture, natural humanities); the postgraduate courses were opened on several specialties.

On February 2, 2011, ESTU was attached to the Kazan (Volga) federal university

Till January 22, 2013, the official abbreviated name of higher educational institution was FSAEI HPE of KFU branch in Elabuga.

KFU and French Petroleum Institute signed the agreement on cooperation in 2015.

In 2021, a division of Elabuga Institute called Alabuga Polytechnic College opened in the Alabuga Special Economic Zone. The school employs students as young as 15 at the Yelabuga drone factory to produce Shahed drones for use in the Russian invasion of Ukraine.

== Structure of higher educational institution ==
The management of the institute is exercised by:

- Director
- Deputy Directors
- Academic council
- Board of trustees
- Educational department
- Department of research work
- Department of postgraduate study
- Department of social and educational work
- Management of accounting and financial control
- Selection committee
- Personnel department

As a part of the Elabuga institute there are also 10 faculties, where 23 departments, 4 museums, more than 20 educational, problem and scientific laboratories work.

=== Faculties ===
- Engineering and Technology Faculty
- Foreign Languages Faculty
- Mathematics and Natural Science Faculty
- Psychology and Pedagogy Faculty
- Philology and History Faculty
- Economics and Management Faculty
- Law Faculty

=== Departments ===
- English Philology and Cross Cultural Communications Department
- Biology and Chemistry Department
- World and National History, State History and Law Department
- Foreign Languages Department
- Mathematics and Applied Computer Science Department
- German Philology Department
- General Engineering Training Department
- Pedagogy Department
- Psychology Department
- Russian Language and Contrastive Linguistics Department
- Russian and Foreign Literature Department
- Tatar Philology Department
- Theoretical Foundations of Physical Culture and Life Safety Department
- Theory and Methodology of Teaching Law and Jurisprudence Department
- Theory and Methodology of Professional Education Department
- Criminal Proceedings and Judicial Activities Department
- Physics Department
- Philosophy and Sociology Department
- Private and Public Law Department
- Economics and Management Department

=== Museums ===
- The Museum of Archaeology and History of Tatarstan
- The Museum of History of Elabuga Institute of KFU
- The Museum of Elabuga Merchants
- The Museum of the Tatar language and literature

The most unique historical exhibits are displayed in the Museum of Archaeology and History of Tatarstan and the Museum of Elabuga Merchants. The last one has a collection of original items of merchant life, furniture, records and photographs. The museum has thematic separation in accordance with key trends of merchant life and economy: merchant's shop, the nook of the ladies' room, merchant's living room. The institute structure also includes Research Department; Postgraduate Studies; Editing and Publishing Complex; Center of Advanced Training, Retraining and Further Education; Educational Resource Center; Scientific Library (its funds have more than 500,000 volumes); Center of Innovative Educational Technologies; Sporting Complex; Sport and Recreation Camp; five educational buildings.

== Teaching staff ==
On February 21, 2013, the number of faculty members in the Yelabuga Institute CFI was 243 people, including 15 doctors of sciences, professors; 1 PhD ( associate professors), professor; 118 associate professors.

== Scientific and educational projects ==
=== International Staheev readings ===
Staheev readings is the name of the scientific conference, traditionally organized in Yelabuga Institute KFU with the participation of scientists from the metropolitan and regional universities, as well as representatives of the leading scientific schools of near and far abroad (foreign countries).

=== All-Russian National Festival of schoolteachers in Yelabuga ===
The first it was organized in August 2010 in Yelabuga State Pedagogical University. The first festival was attended by about 150 teachers from the Republic of Tatarstan and other regions of Russia.

Scientists of Russian and foreign universities, teachers – the winners of the contest "Teacher of the Year in Russia" are invited as moderators.

The festival brings together teachers and secondary education workers, giving them the opportunity to share experiences of educational activities, meet developments and achievements in the field of educational technologies. The priority of the festival is to study foreign experience. For example, the educators from Singapore (M. Tiruman, the head of the corporation ST Electronics, realizing the state project "Electronic school"; See Sung Lim, Deputy Director of the School Hwa Chong Junior College, realizing the state project "School of the future"), as well as from Latvia, Bulgaria, Germany and so on took part in the festival in different years.

=== Teacher of a new generation ===
The main objective of the project is to prepare competitive specialists under the conditions of the modernizing education system. The participants, mainly senior students of Yelabuga institute undergo additional training taking such courses as English language in professional activity, pedagogical innovation and pedagogical culture.

=== Children's university ===
Children's university is an educational project of Kazan (Volga Region) Federal University. The main objective of the project is to conduct interactive sessions in the popular science lectures form on the history, law, mathematics, chemistry, physics, astronomy, biology, etc., for children 8–14 years by professors and lecturers of the university.

First classes of Children's university were held on December 11, 2011, and since they held in Elabuga Institute KFU.

=== InteLLeto ===
The project was created in 2010 on the basis of ESPU (Elabuga State Pedagogical University). Its purpose was to organize outdoor activities and comprehensive development of children between the ages of 7 and 15 years during the school holidays in the form of an intellectual-health camp.

=== Collaboration between KFU and school ===
A number of textbooks for students and teachers of secondary education had been published within the project of Kazan (Volga Region) Federal University "Collaboration between KFU and school" in Elabuga Institute.

== University media ==
- Univesti: the official newspaper of Elabuga Institute KFU. Circulation 999 copies. Published monthly, free of charge.
- Flashka: the student newspaper. It issued mainly by students of Russian Philology and Journalism Faculty.
- Shakert: the student newspaper of Tatar and Comparative Philology Faculty.

== Student groups ==
=== Public organizations and associations ===
- Headquarters of labor groups
- Psychological service "Aelita"
- Primary trade-union organization of students
- Student's security service "Forpost"
- Ecological volunteer society of students "EKODOS"
- Archaeological circle
- School of legal education
- School of guides
- School of the young journalist

=== Creative groups ===
- Team of KVN "Gospoda"
- Team of KVN "Mira Avenue"
- Vocal group "Academy" and others

== Notable alumni ==
- Rina Zaripova, journalist, Honored Worker of Culture of the Republic of Tatarstan (philological faculty).

== Interesting facts ==
• The building of the Yelabuga institute of KFU is an architectural monument and is included in the register of the Yelabuga state memorial estate.

• In May 2013 the agreement on friendship and cooperation in research, educational and other spheres was signed between Kazan (Volga) federal and St. Petersburg state universities. The Yelabuga institute of KFU was symbolically chosen as the place of signing, in memory of the fact that in the period of World War II in the building of higher educational establishment was located the evacuated St. Petersburg State University branch.

== Literature ==
1. Kaviyev A. F., Nasyrova L. V. Eparchy school for girls in Elabuga — a model of merchant charity.//Third readings devoted to Stakheev: Materials of the International scientific conference. — Elabuga: ESPU publishing house, 2008. Pp. 248 — 251
2. Kalimullin A. M., Kornilov I. V. Museum of Elabuga merchantry: traditions of the Russian charity.//Patronage, charity, entrepreneurship and social policy of the state (traditions and present) |Text |: Collection of materials of the All-Russian scientific and practical conference (Kirov, December 4–5, 2006). In 2 t. — Kirov: MFYUA and RUI, 2006. — 2 t. — ISBN 5-94811-072-9
