= Kazkash =

River in Tatarstan, Russia

Physical characteristics
- Mouth: Myosha
  - coordinates: 55°52′31″N 50°24′59″E

Basin features
- Tributaries
  - right: Saba

Kazkash is a river in Tatarstan, Russia.
