= Tatar Book Publishers =

Russian Tatar-language publisher

- Parent company: Government of Tatarstan
- Status: Active
- Founded: July 22, 1919; 106 years ago
- Country of origin: Russia (Republic of Tatarstan)
- Headquarters location: 2 Dekabristov str., Kazan, Tatarstan
- Distribution: Worldwide
- Key people: Ildar Sagdatshin (CEO)
- Publication types: Books
- Nonfiction topics: Literature on Tatar culture and in Tatar language
- Official website: www.tatkniga.ru

Tatar Book Publishers (Tatar: Татарстан китап нәшрияты) is a Soviet and Russian regional state-owned publishing house located in Tatarstan. It predominantly prints books in the Tatar language and is the largest publishing house among those specializing in literature in regional languages of Russia as well as one of the largest publishing houses in Tatarstan. Tatar Book Publishers publishes fiction and children's literature, textbooks, academic publications.

Its current name dates back to 1958 when it became the principal publishing house of the Tatar Autonomous Soviet Socialist Republic. In 2018 the Publisher had 190 permanent commercial partners.

On top of school subject textbooks, ordered by Tatarstan ministry of education and science for schools using Tatar as a medium of instruction, as well as some privately ordered or grant-funded books, the publishing house printed 106 titles (of them 32 children's literature) in 2018, and 103 (28) in 2019.

== Gallery ==
Tatar Book Publishers' stand at the 33rd Moscow International Book Fair (September 2nd-6th, 2020)
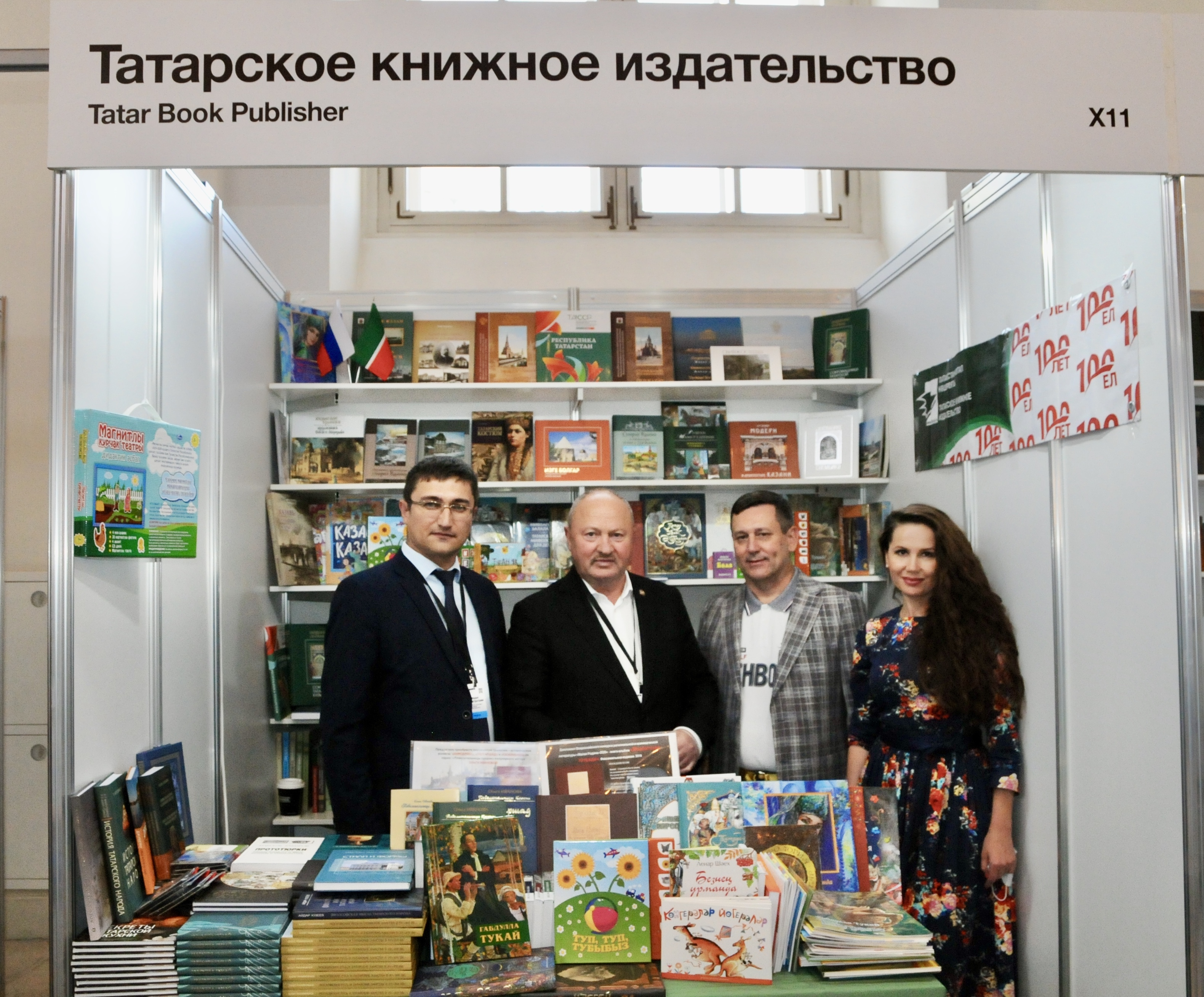

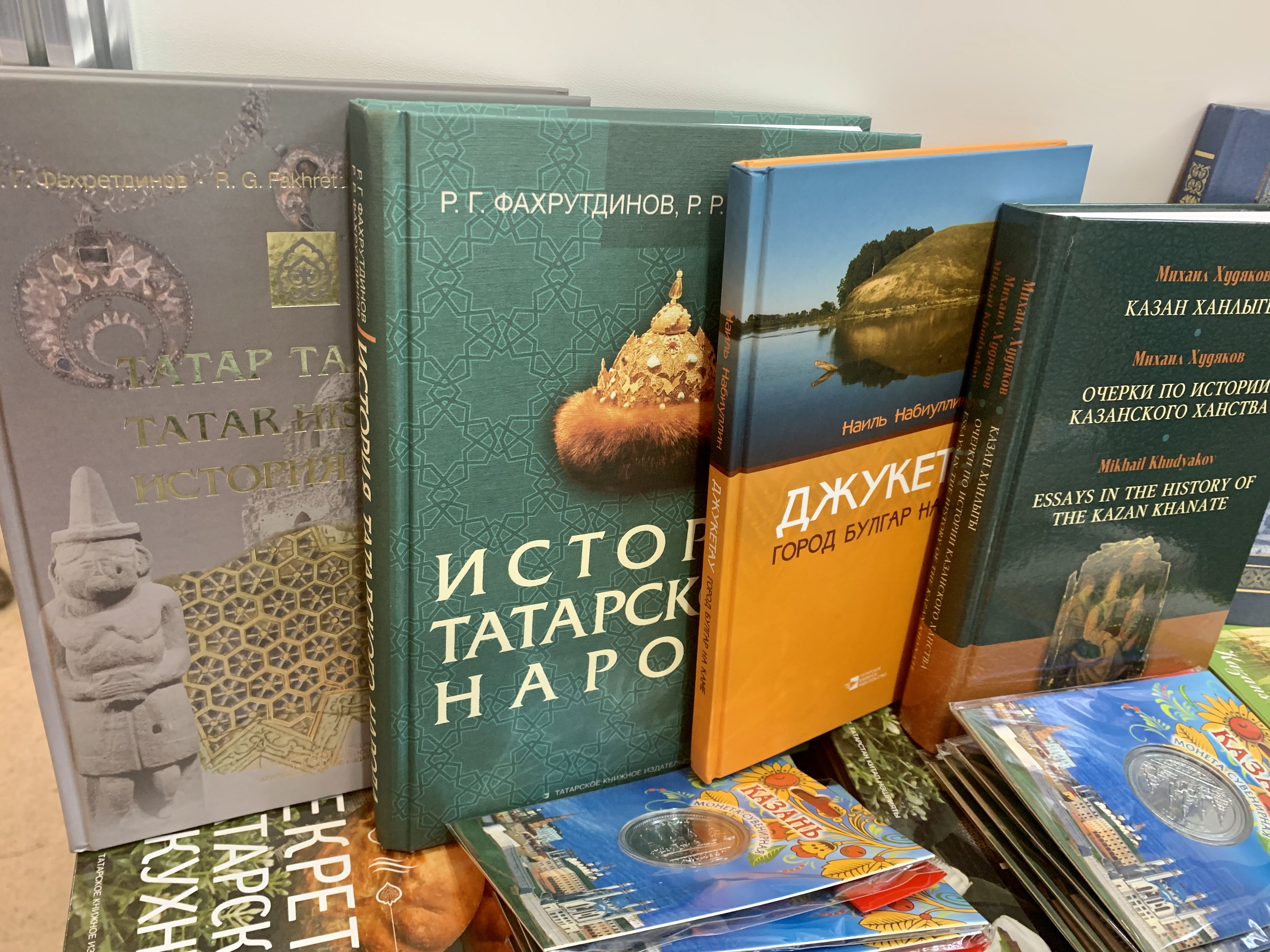

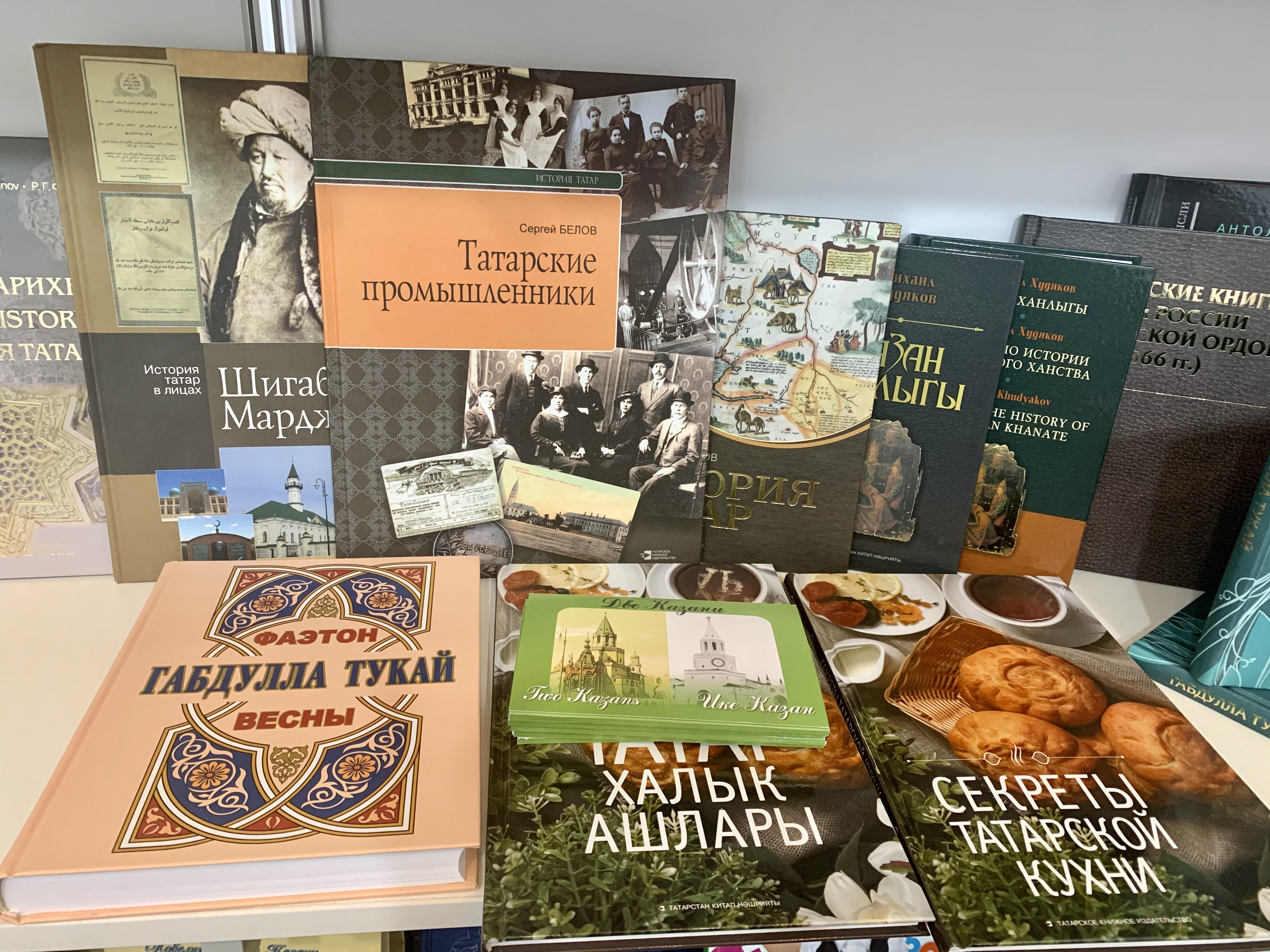

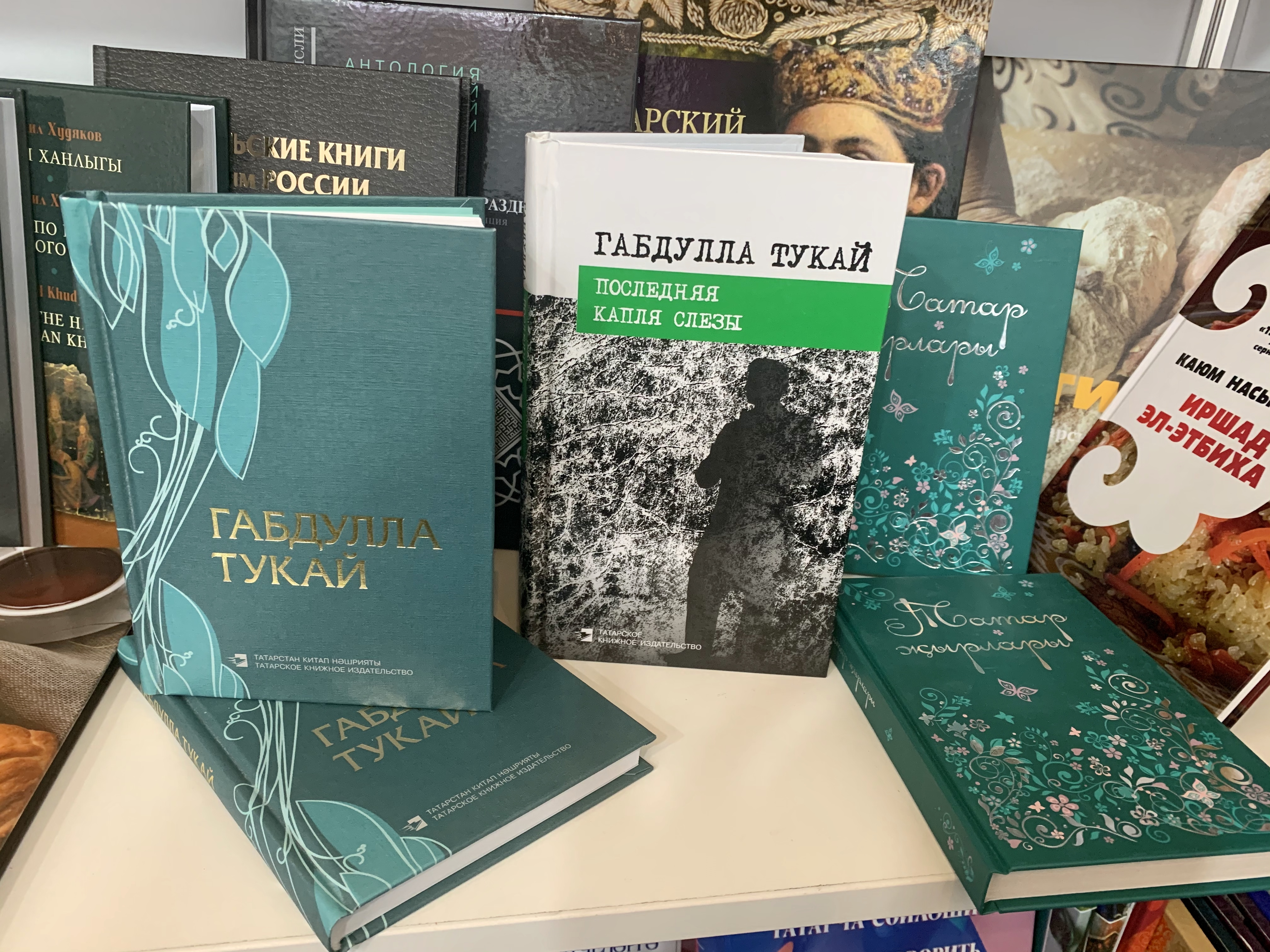

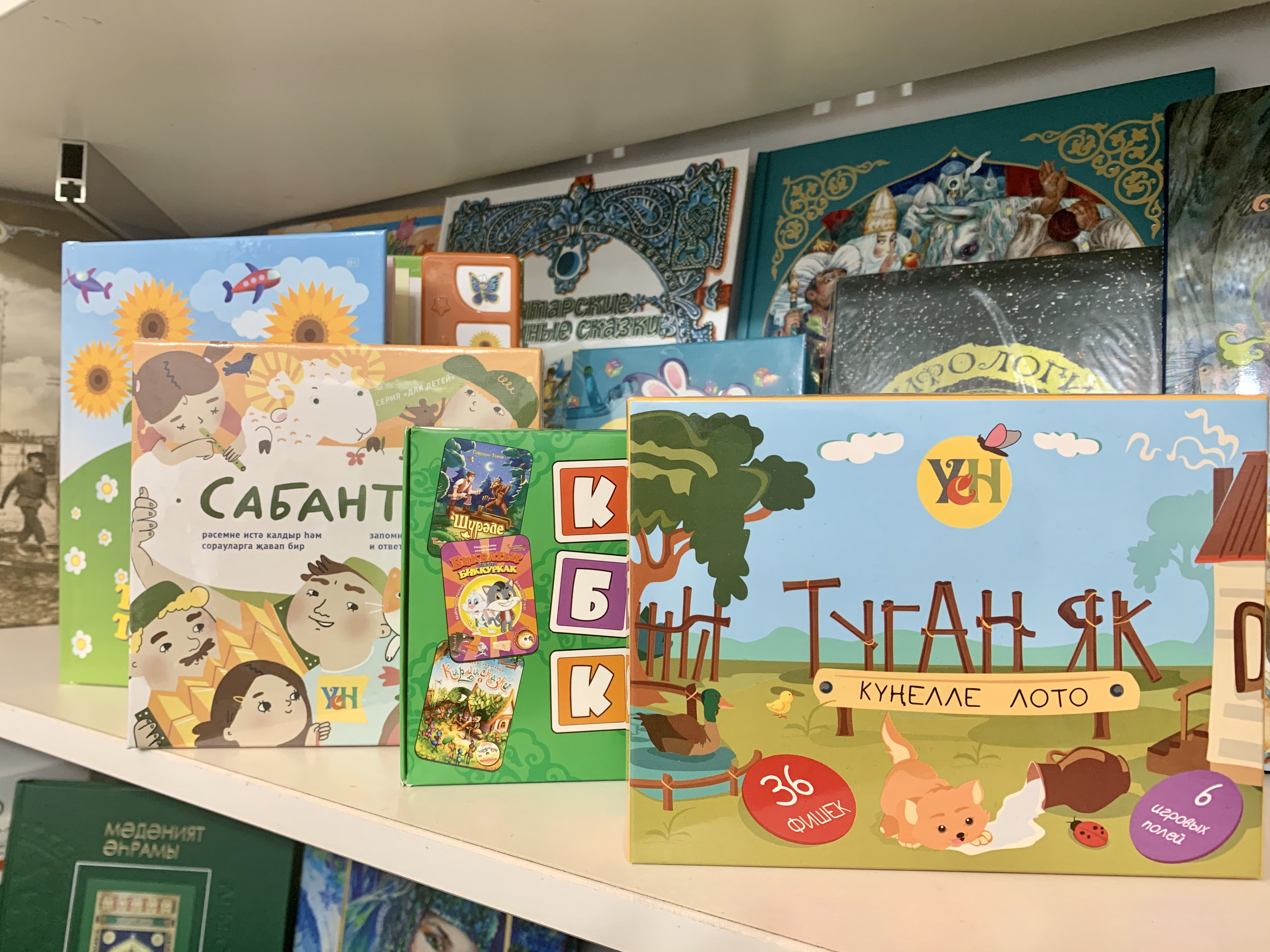
