= Yaña Älem =

Yaña Älem Яңа Әлем
- selo
- Location within Tatarstan
- Country: Russia
- Region: Tatarstan
- District: Aqtanış District
- Time zone: UTC+3:00

Yaña Älem (Tatar: Яңа Әлем, romanized: Yaña Älem) is a rural locality (a selo) in Aqtanış District, Tatarstan. The population was 1309 as of 2010. Yaña Älem is located 6 km from Aqtanış, district's administrative centre, and 371 km from Qazan, republic's capital, by road. The village was established in 18th century. There are 10 streets in the village.
