= Yatmas Dusay =

Yatmas Dusay Ятмас Дусай
- selo
- Location within Tatarstan
- Country: Russia
- Region: Tatarstan
- District: Kukmara District
- Time zone: UTC+3:00

Yatmas Dusay (Tatar: Ятмас Дусай) is a rural locality (a selo) in Kukmara District, Tatarstan, Russian Federation. The population was 348 as of 2010. Yatmas Dusay is located 29 km from Kukmara, district's administrative centre, and 131 km from Kazan, republic's capital, by road. The earliest known record of the settlement dates from 1619. There are 3 streets in the village.
