= Käzkäy =

Käzkäy Кәзкәй
- selo
- Location within Tatarstan
- Country: Russia
- Region: Tatarstan
- District: Aqtanış District
- Time zone: UTC+3:00

Käzkäy (Tatar: Кәзкәй, romanized: Käzkäy) is a rural locality (a selo) in Aqtanış District, Tatarstan. The population was 304 as of 2010. Käzkäy is located 11 km from Aqtanış, district's administrative centre, and 384 km from Qazan, republic's capital, by road. The village was established in 17th century. There are 3 streets in the village.
