= Tetyushi =

Tetyushi (Russian: Тетюши) is the name of several inhabited localities in Russia.

Urban localities

- Tetyushi, Republic of Tatarstan, a town in Tetyushsky District of the Republic of Tatarstan

Rural localities

- Tetyushi, Republic of Mordovia, a selo in Bolshemanadyshsky Selsoviet of Atyashevsky District in the Republic of Mordovia; 54°34′N 46°2′E
- Tetyushi, Nizhny Novgorod Oblast, a village in Bolshearsky Selsoviet of Lukoyanovsky District in Nizhny Novgorod Oblast; 55°4′N 44°34′E
