= Laishevo =

Town in the Republic of Tatarstan, Russia

Laishevo Лаишево
- Town

Other transcription(s)
  - Tatar: Лаеш
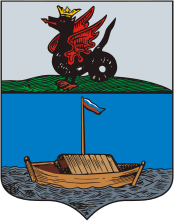
- Coat of arms
- Interactive map of Laishevo
- Location of Laishevo Laishevo (Tatarstan)
- Coordinates: 55°24′N 49°34′E
- Country: Russia
- Federal subject: Tatarstan
- Administrative district: Laishevsky District
- Founded: 1557 (Julian)
- Town status since: 2004
- Elevation: 80 m (260 ft)

Population (2010 Census)
  - Total: 7,735
  - Estimate (2021): 9,076 (+17.3%)

Administrative status
  - Capital of: Laishevsky District

Municipal status
  - Municipal district: Laishevsky Municipal District
  - Urban settlement: Laishevo Urban Settlement
  - Capital of: Laishevsky Municipal District, Laishevo Urban Settlement
- Time zone: UTC+3 (MSK)
- Postal codes: 422610, 422611, 422617, 422639
- Dialing code: +7 85551
- OKTMO ID: 92634101001

Laishevo (Russian: Лаи́шево; Tatar: Лаеш) is a town and the administrative center of Laishevsky District in the Republic of Tatarstan, Russia, located on the right bank of the Kama River on the shore of the Kuybyshev Reservoir, 62 kilometers (39 mi) southeast of the republic's capital of Kazan. As of the 2010 Census, its population was 7,735.

== History ==
Known as Laishev (Лаишев) since the times of the Khanate of Kazan, it was granted town status in 1781. In 1920–1927, it served as the administrative center of a kanton. In 1926, it was demoted in status to a selo and given its present name. In 1950, it was granted urban-type settlement status. It served as the administrative center of a district in 1930–1963 and then again since 1965. Town status was granted to it again in 2004.

On 22 August 2013, four members of a family were killed by toxic fumes from some rotten potatoes stored in their basement.

Approximate Corded Ware culture and Yamnaya culture extent c. 3300–2600 BC. (population background, to add posterior steppe conquerors)

== Administrative and municipal status ==
Within the framework of administrative divisions, Laishevo serves as the administrative center of Laishevsky District, to which it is directly subordinated. As a municipal division, the town of Laishevo, together with the village of Staraya Pristan, is incorporated within Laishevsky Municipal District as Laishevo Urban Settlement.

== Economy ==
As of 1997, economic activity revolved around the starch and fish-processing plants, a garment factory, and a forestry farm.

== Demographics ==
Laishevo population
- 2010 Census: 7,735
- 2002 Census: 7,730
- 1989 Census: 7,067
- 1979 Census: 6,706

As of 1989, the population was ethnically mostly Russian (74.9%), Tatar (21.8%), and Chuvash (1.4%).
