= Administrative divisions of the Republic of Tatarstan =

Republic of Tatarstan Russia
- Capital: Kazan

Administrative structure (as of 2015)
- Administrative districts: 43
- Cities/towns: 23
- Urban‑type settlements: 18
- n/a
- Rural localities: 3,074

Municipal structure (as of January 1, 2008)
- Municipal districts: 43
- Urban okrugs: 2
- Urban settlements: 38
- Rural settlements: 898

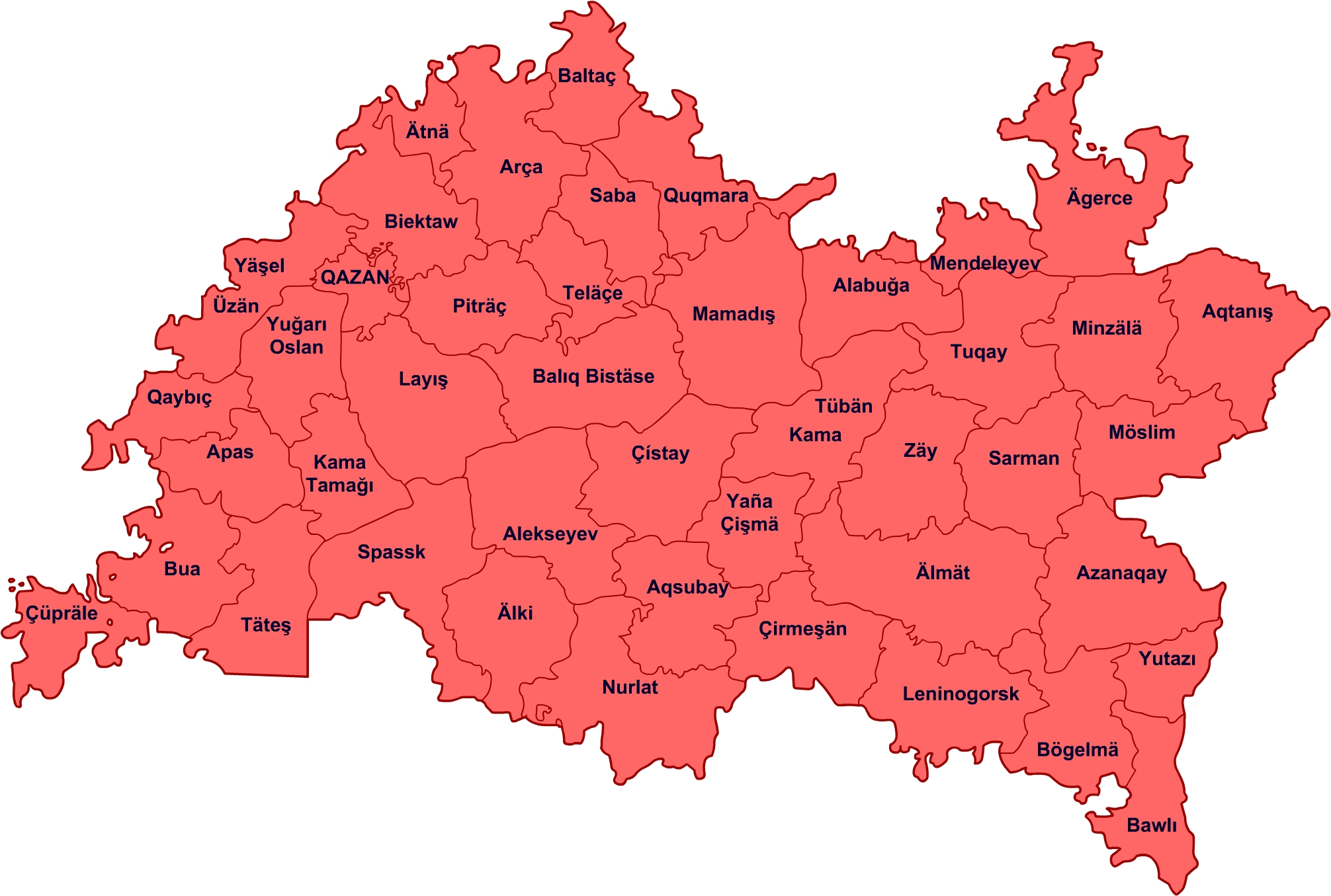
Administrative Divisions of the Republic of Tatarstan

This is a list of units of administrative division of the Republic of Tatarstan, a federal subject of Russia.

Tatarstan is located in the center of the East European Plain, between the Volga and the Kama Rivers, stretching east towards the Ural Mountains. It was originally established as the Tatar ASSR within the Russian SFSR on May 27, 1920 from Kazansky, Chistopolsky, Mamadyshsky, Sviyazhsky, Tetyushinsky, Laishevsky, and Spassky Uyezds of the former Kazan Governorate, Yelabuzhsky Uyezd of Ufa Governorate, as well as the part of Simbirsk, Samara, and Vyatka Governorates. In 1922, Yelabuga with environs was transferred to the Tatar ASSR from Vyatka Governorate.

Initially, the territory of the ASSR was divided into ten kantons - Sviyazhsk, Tetyushi, Buinsk, Spassk, Chistopol, Menzelinsk, Bugulma, Arsk, Laishevo, and Mamadysh. On the territories transferred to the Tatar ASSR in 1922, Yelabuga and Agryz kantons were established, while Chelny Kanton was separated from Menzelinsk Kanton. All kantons had roughly the same borders and the territory as the uyezds which preceded them, and preserved the division into volosts.

In the 1930s, kantons were finally abolished and replaced with forty-five districts (raions). In 1935, they were broken down into smaller units, resulting in sixty districts. By 1940, the number of districts increased to forty-three and peaked at seventy in 1944–1955. By 1957, the number of districts decreased to sixty-three.

During the 1960s, some of the districts were merged, and their number diminished to thirty-seven. Only some of them were broken into smaller units again. The number of districts stabilized at forty-three after Atninsky District was split from Arsky District in 1990.

In 1952–1953, the Tatar ASSR was administratively divided into three oblasts—Bugulma, Chistopol, and Kazan Oblast, but due to the oblasts' small sizes they were abolished in 1954. On August 30, 1990, the Tatar ASSR became the first one to be elevated in status as a republic within the Russian SFSR, becoming the Republic of Tatarstan.

== Administrative and municipal divisions ==
Map

Division		Structure		OKATO	OKTMO	Urban-type settlement/ district-level town*
Division		Administrative	Municipal	OKATO	OKTMO	Urban-type settlement/ district-level town*
Kazan (Казань)		city	urban okrug	92 401	92 701	
↳	Aviastroitelny (Авиастроительный)	(under Kazan)	—N/a	92 401	—N/a	
↳	Kirovsky (Кировский)	(under Kazan)	—N/a	92 401	—N/a	
↳	Moskovsky (Московский)	(under Kazan)	—N/a	92 401	—N/a	
↳	Novo-Savinovsky (Ново-Савиновский)	(under Kazan)	—N/a	92 401	—N/a	
↳	Privolzhsky (Приволжский)	(under Kazan)	—N/a	92 401	—N/a	
↳	Sovetsky (Советский)	(under Kazan)	—N/a	92 401	—N/a	
↳	Vakhitovsky (Вахитовский)	(under Kazan)	—N/a	92 401	—N/a	
Aznakayevo (Азнакаево)		city	(under Aznakayevsky)	92 403	92 602	
Almetyevsk (Альметьевск)		city	(under Almetyevsky)	92 405	92 608	
Bavly (Бавлы)		city	(under Bavlinsky)	92 408	92 614	
Bugulma (Бугульма)		city	(under Bugulminsky)	92 410	92 617	
Buinsk (Буинск)		city	(under Buinsky)	92 412	92 618	
Yelabuga (Елабуга)		city	(under Yelabuzhsky)	92 415	92 626	
Zainsk (Заинск)		city	(under Zainsky)	92 417	92 627	
Zelenodolsk (Зеленодольск)		city	(under Zelenodolsky)	92 420	92 628	
Leninogorsk (Лениногорск)		city	(under Leninogorsky)	92 425	92 636	
Naberezhnye Chelny (Набережные Челны)		city	urban okrug	92 430	92 730	
Nizhnekamsk (Нижнекамск)		city	(under Nizhnekamsky)	92 435	92 644	
Nurlat (Нурлат)		city	(under Nurlatsky)	92 437	92 646	
Chistopol (Чистополь)		city	(under Chistopolsky)	92 440	92 659	
Agryzsky (Агрызский)		district		92 201	92 601	Agryz (Агрыз) town*
Aznakayevsky (Азнакаевский)		district		92 202	92 602	Aktyubinsky (Актюбинский)
Aksubayevsky (Аксубаевский)		district		92 204	92 604	Aksubayevo (Аксубаево)
Aktanyshsky (Актанышский)		district		92 205	92 605	
Alexeyevsky (Алексеевский)		district		92 206	92 606	Alexeyevskoye (Алексеевское)
Alkeyevsky (Алькеевский)		district		92 207	92 607	
Almetyevsky (Альметьевский)		district		92 208	92 608	Nizhnyaya Maktama (Нижняя Мактама)
Apastovsky (Апастовский)		district		92 210	92 610	Apastovo (Апастово)
Arsky (Арский)		district		92 212	92 612	Arsk (Арск) town*
Atninsky (Атнинский)		district		92 213	92 613	
Bavlinsky (Бавлинский)		district		92 214	92 614	
Baltasinsky (Балтасинский)		district		92 215	92 615	Baltasi (Балтаси)
Bugulminsky (Бугульминский)		district		92 217	92 617	Karabash (Карабаш)
Buinsky (Буинский)		district		92 218	92 618	
Verkhneuslonsky (Верхнеуслонский)		district		92 220	92 620	Innopolis (Иннополис) town*
Vysokogorsky (Высокогорский)		district		92 222	92 622	
Drozhzhanovsky (Дрожжановский)		district		92 224	92 624	
Yelabuzhsky (Елабужский)		district		92 226	92 626	
Zainsky (Заинский)		district		92 227	92 627	
Zelenodolsky (Зеленодольский)		district		92 228	92 628	Nizhniye Vyazovye (Нижние Вязовые); Vasilyevo (Васильево)
Kaybitsky (Кайбицкий)		district		92 229	92 629	
Kamsko-Ustyinsky (Камско-Устьинский)		district		92 230	92 630	Kamskoye Ustye (Камское Устье); Kuybyshevsky Zaton (Куйбышевский Затон); Tenishevo (Тенишево)
Spassky (Спасский)		district		92 232	92 632	Bolgar (Болгар) town*
Kukmorsky (Кукморский)		district		92 233	92 633	Kukmor (Кукмор)
Laishevsky (Лаишевский)		district		92 234	92 634	Laishevo (Лаишево) town*
Leninogorsky (Лениногорский)		district		92 236	92 636	
Mamadyshsky (Мамадышский)		district		92 238	92 638	Mamadysh (Мамадыш) town*
Mendeleyevsky (Менделеевский)		district		92 239	92 639	Mendeleyevsk (Менделеевск) town*
Menzelinsky (Мензелинский)		district		92 240	92 640	Menzelinsk (Мензелинск) town*
Muslyumovsky (Муслюмовский)		district		92 242	92 642	
Nizhnekamsky (Нижнекамский)		district		92 244	92 644	Kamskiye Polyany (Камские Поляны)
Novosheshminsky (Новошешминский)		district		92 245	92 645	
Nurlatsky (Нурлатский)		district		92 246	92 646	
Pestrechinsky (Пестречинский)		district		92 248	92 648	
Rybno-Slobodsky (Рыбно-Слободский)		district		92 250	92 650	Rybnaya Sloboda (Рыбная Слобода)
Sabinsky (Сабинский)		district		92 252	92 652	Bogatye Saby (Богатые Сабы)
Sarmanovsky (Сармановский)		district		92 253	92 653	Dzhalil (Джалиль)
Yutazinsky (Ютазинский)		district		92 254	92 654	Urussu (Уруссу)
Tetyushsky (Тетюшский)		district		92 255	92 655	Tetyushi (Тетюши) town*
Tyulyachinsky (Тюлячинский)		district		92 256	92 656	
Tukayevsky (Тукаевский)		district		92 257	92 657	
Cheremshansky (Черемшанский)		district		92 258	92 658	
Chistopolsky (Чистопольский)		district		92 259	92 659	
