= 1992 Tatarstani sovereignty referendum =

- 21 March 1992
- Do you agree that the Republic of Tatarstan is a sovereign state, a subject of international law, building its relations with the Russian Federation and other republics (states) on an equal basis?

Results
Choice	Votes	%
Yes	1,309,056	62.23%
No	794,444	37.77%
Valid votes	2,103,500	98.65%
Invalid or blank votes	28,851	1.35%
Total votes	2,132,351	100.00%
Registered voters/turnout	2,600,297	82%
- Results by districts and cities
- Source: Central Referendum Commission

A sovereignty referendum was held in Tatarstan, Russia, on 21 March 1992. Voters were asked whether they approved of Tatarstan being a sovereign state.

On 30 August 1990 the Tatar ASSR, then part of the Russian SFSR of the Soviet Union, adopted a Declaration of State Sovereignty, elevating its status to that of a union republic with the intention of joining a renewed Soviet Union as its own independent entity. However, a coup attempt precipitated the collapse of the Soviet Union, leaving the Tatar ASSR in a state of limbo. Russia refused to recognize Tatarstan's sovereignty and instead wanted it to join a new Federation Treaty. Faced with a hostile central government, growing unrest, and a rise in nationalism, the regional government ordered a referendum be held to decide on the republic's sovereignty.

Campaigning began in February 1992 with voting taking place on 21 March 1992. Voters were given a choice to either vote for or against Tatarstan's sovereignty, however, the question and wording were ambiguous and the opposing sides of the referendum interpreted the word 'sovereignty' differently; Tatar nationalists believing independence and pro-Russian groups believing autonomy. The Russian government opposed the referendum, claiming it was an attempt to have Tatarstan secede. The Tatarstan government denied the referendum was about independence and instead said it was simply to confirm the republic's sovereignty declaration.

Despite Russian attempts to prevent the vote, it went ahead on schedule and the results showed that 62% of voters approved of Tatarstan's sovereign status while 38% opposed it. The vote was peaceful and afterward Tatarstan adopted a new constitution declaring it a "sovereign democratic state" and a "subject of international law". Tatarstan entered in to negotiations with Russia to consider a bilateral treaty. The treaty, signed on 15 February 1994, granted Tatarstan significant autonomy while it agreed to remain part of Russia but with "special status". When Vladimir Putin came to power in 2000, he sought to undo Tatarstan's autonomy gains. Throughout the decade the bilateral treaty and all references to sovereignty were abolished, ending Tatarstan's special status.

== Background ==
In the final years of the Soviet Union, the heavily centralized system of the country began to unravel due to economic and social reforms by Soviet leader Mikhail Gorbachev. On 16 November 1988 the Estonian SSR issued a Declaration of State Sovereignty, which asserted that Estonian laws take priority on its territory over Soviet ones. This began the what became known as the "parade of sovereignties". In the following years the other union republics declared their own state sovereignty, with the Russian SFSR doing so on 12 June 1990. Russia's declaration called for the expanded rights of its autonomous republics and other territories and a month after, Russian leader Boris Yeltsin called on the republics to "take as much sovereignty as you can swallow". On 30 August 1990 the Tatar ASSR heeded the call and issued a Declaration of State Sovereignty, becoming among the first ASSRs to do so. Tatarstan, however, took it a step further by omitting any mention of the republic being part of Russia. By 1991 negotiations were underway to form a new treaty that would reconstitute the country as a loose confederation, with Tatarstan saying it would sign the treaty as its own independent entity outside of Russian jurisdiction. However, an attempted coup in August 1991 ended any hopes of preserving the country and the union republics began to declare their independence, with the Soviet Union dissolving on 26 December 1991.

Tatarstan, among Russia's most industrialized and prosperous regions, had long sought to expand its rights, especially over its economy and resources. 1991 was a tumultuous year for Tatarstan, growing tensions between Tatar nationalists, pro-Russian groups, and the republic's leadership over Tatarstan's status resulted in frequent unrest. Tatarstan also faced pressure from the Russian government, which refused to recognize the republic's sovereignty. Asserting itself as not part of Russia, Tatarstan boycotted the June 1991 presidential election and instead held its own parallel presidential election in which its de facto leader Mintimer Shaimiev was the only candidate. Shaimiev, a former Communist Party stalwart and supporter of the attempted coup, used Tatarstan's status limbo to obtain concessions from the Russian government on expanding the republic's powers but Russian officials opposed it, prompting increased tension between the two. Tensions reached a boiling point when Yeltsin began pressuring Shaimiev to endorse the upcoming Federation Treaty slated for 25 March 1992. When he refused Yeltsin attempted to have Shaimiev removed in late 1991. At home Shaimiev was facing increasingly radical Tatar nationalists who were demanding independence. On 29 October 1991 thousands of nationalists attempted to storm the Tatarstan Supreme Soviet after lawmakers refused to declare independence, injuring several people. In February 1992 radical nationalists adopted several resolutions calling for an independence struggle, including up to a "war of liberation". Meanwhile, farther away, Yeltsin's attempt to act tough on secession by sending the military to Chechnya, which had declared independence in November 1991, met with resistance and failed. Feeling emboldened by Yeltsin's apparent weakness and needing to quell nationalist sentiment, Shaimiev announced that a referendum was to be held on 21 March 1992, four days before the treaty.

== Conduct ==
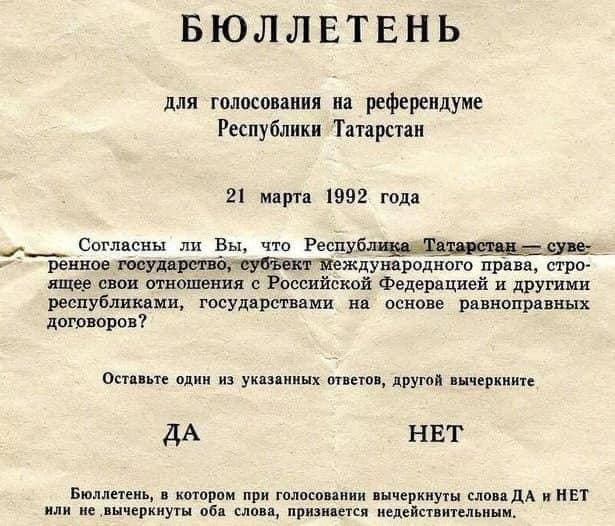
Ballot paper used in the referendum

Campaigning on the referendum began immediately after announcement on 21 February. Tatarstan's government and nationalists rallied for a 'yes' vote while pro-Russian groups called on people to vote against it. The Tatarstan government campaigned exclusively on the economic benefits of sovereignty, avoiding any ethnic dimensions. Critics of the referendum charged that Shaimiev only conducted it to preserve his power and that of the former communist elite and was using the nationalist movement as a new base of popular support. However, no organized attempt to boycott the referendum occurred. According to Fandas Safiullin, a former deputy of Tatarstan's parliament, Tatarstan was littered with flyers coming in from other parts of Russia urging a 'no' vote.

Yeltsin and the Russian government, fearful for the country's future after Chechnya's unilateral independence, refused to acknowledge the referendum and the Russian government initially tried to get it pulled by appealing to the Constitutional Court on its legitimacy. The court promptly declared the vote illegal but Tatarstan ignored the ruling and went ahead. Officials from the Russian Prosecutor General's offices were sent to every district to disrupt preparations for the referendum. Despite his opposition, Yeltsin himself did not forcefully try to stop the referendum; in an address he warned voters to vote against it or "blood may be spilled". Nevertheless, the government deployed the Russian Armed Forces to neighbouring regions to conduct military exercises. Reports emerged that the Commonwealth of Independent States sent its own troops to Mari El to intimidate the Tatarstan government, however, the local military command claimed that the troops were defectors from Ukraine who were redeployed.

The referendum question was criticized for being vague and voters on the day of the referendum admitted it was "confusing". The word 'sovereignty' was interpreted differently by the two opposing sides; nationalists believing it to be independence while unionists took it to mean nothing more than autonomy. The Tatarstan government denied the referendum was for independence, instead saying it was to confirm and strengthen the republic's sovereignty declaration of 30 August 1990. This contrasted with Tatar nationalists leaders who contested that "self-rule meant independence". Russian officials insisted the wording of the referendum implied secession and Yeltsin warned that the referendum risked ethnic violence. A day before the referendum, Shaimiev in a speech said "I, as the President of sovereign Tatarstan, declare that we are forever with the Russian people, with Russia. We do not violate the integrity of Russia in any way." In a May 1992 interview after the referendum Shaimiev explained that the wording was deliberately meant to be unclear and that a direct question might have led to undesired outcomes. He claimed that it was suggested to make the question explicitly about secession but he opposed it.

=== Question ===
The question put to voters was:

Do you agree that the Republic of Tatarstan is a sovereign state, a subject of international law, building its relations with the Russian Federation and other republics (states) on an equal basis?

== Results ==
Despite Russian attempts to halt the vote, the referendum went ahead on schedule with votes tallied the next day. The referendum ended peacefully with 62% of voters endorsing Tatarstan's sovereignty while 38% opposed it. Support for sovereignty was most prevalent in rural areas at 75.3%, while support in urban centers, where a higher percentage of ethnic Russians lived, was 58.7% in favour. The rural Aktanyshsky District, which had the largest percentage of ethnic Tatars in 1989, recorded the strongest support for sovereignty, at 99.59%. Conversely, the opposition to sovereignty performed the best in the city of Bugulma, at 66.04%.

Observers of the vote declared that the referendum was largely free and fair, with few instances of fraud. John J. Nimrod, the United Nations observer, praised the referendum for its participation and stated that "these free and open elections gave the people an opportunity to express their free will". However, a spokesman for the Democratic Party of Russia (DPR) claimed that some of its observers were harassed, detained, and prevented from monitoring some polling stations in rural areas by police allegedly searching for drugs.

Choice	Votes	%
For	1,309,056	62.23
Against	794,444	37.77
Total	2,103,500	100.00
Valid votes	2,103,500	98.65
Invalid/blank votes	28,851	1.35
Total votes	2,132,351	100.00
Registered voters/turnout	2,600,297	82.00
Source: Central Referendum Commission

=== Results in Kazan ===
Results in the capital Kazan showed only 46.79% of the electorate voted in favour of sovereignty. Six out of seven capital's districts voted against the sovereignty, albeit by narrow margins. (Note: Kazan's districts were partially redrawn and renamed in 1995, so the subdivisions below do not precisely correspond with modern-day ones)

District	Yes	No
Baumansky	47.49%	50.08%
Vahitovsky	44.44%	53.09%
Kirovsky	43.72%	54.27%
Leninsky	44.31%	53.77%
Moskovsky	48.44%	49.83%
Privolzhsky	53.48%	44.59%
Sovetsky	44.56%	53.28%

== Aftermath ==
After the results were announced sovereignty supporters celebrated outside the Supreme Soviet building while small groups of pro-Russian supporters marched through Kazan waving the Russian flag. Some pro-Russian groups refused to recognize the legal force of the referendum and the Kazan branch of the DPR proposed declaring the city under "Moscow subordination". The Russian government subsequently postponed the signing of the Federation Treaty to 31 March, claiming "organizational problems". Tatarstan Prime Minister Mukhammat Sabirov warned Russia that force must not be used to maintain unity of the country and called for negotiations on a new relationship. Shaimiev expressed satisfaction with the results and stated his wish to see a bilateral treaty signed by April of that year.

When the signing ceremony for the Federation Treaty arrived, Tatarstan, along with the de facto state of Chechnya, were the only ones not to sign it. Tatarstan opposed several aspects of the treaty, including joint control over natural resources and lack of a clause allowing for secession. Deputy chairmen of the Tatarstan Supreme Soviet Alexander Lozovoi said the republic also wanted its own police force, court system, and reforms to the tax system so it benefits Tatarstan. Nonetheless, Tatar representatives were in Moscow to seek a separate treaty, with the Russian government saying it was flexible but stated there were obvious limits. Tatar nationalists responded to the results by convening an all-Tatar Kuraltai that formed a rival government, issued a declaration of independence, and spent the next few months attempting to wrest political power from the Supreme Soviet. This effort ultimately failed and by the summer of 1992 nationalist sentiments fizzled away, leaving Shaimiev with no more opponents.

== Negotiations ==
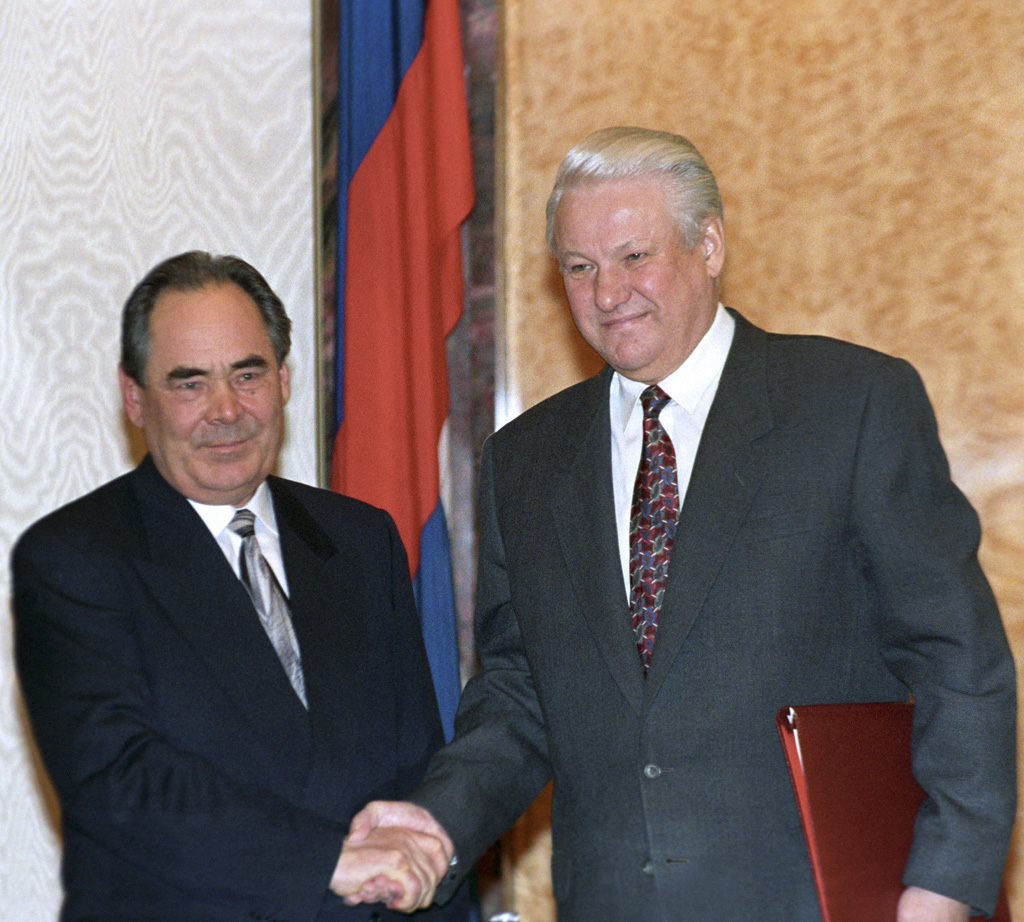
Shaimiev and Yeltsin shake hands after signing the Treaty on Delimitation, 15 February 1994.

Negotiations on a bilateral treaty officially began on 31 March 1992. In the meeting the Tatarstan delegation agreed to relinquish its powers of defense, customs, among other things, to the Russian government. In exchange, Russia granted equal rights to both the Russian and Tatar languages. Following talks in Moscow in August the two sides reached a provisional agreement regarding Tatarstan's budget and oil exports while Tatarstan also claimed the right to its own independent foreign policy, foreign economic relations, and to establish its own military service. As negotiations dragged on, Tatarstan was already acting as if it was an independent state. The courts, organs of justice, and law enforcement were all transferred to the republic's jurisdiction and it declared that all state property belonged to Tatarstan. On 30 November 1992 Tatarstan adopted a new constitution which declared it a "sovereign democratic state" and a "subject of international law". This, however, contradicted Russia's constitution which proclaimed it to be a unitary state outlawing secession. Tatarstan's constitution stipulated that it was associated with Russia based on treaty relations, in other words a confederation. Despite progress on negotiations the ultimately thorny issue of Tatarstan's status remained unresolved and by 1993 relations between the two sides began to break down. The Russian government feared that giving too much concessions would risk spreading similar sentiments to other republics, threatening disintegration. Russia demanded powers relating to military issues such as armament production. When Tatarstan refused Russia halted funding for Tatarstan's military industrial complex, forcing the republic to agree to joint control. Tatarstan in turn demanded more powers relating to its taxes and spending powers and often withheld tax revenues to Moscow in an attempt to gain a favourable agreement, forcing Yeltsin to relent when he tried to pressure the republic.

Outside Tatarstan Yeltsin was fighting an increasingly bitter power struggle with the Supreme Soviet and Congress of People's Deputies, which opposed Yeltsin's overtures to the republics. Their attempt to force early presidential elections in a referendum on 25 April 1993 failed. However, Yeltsin's popularity was low in the republics, with Tatarstan actively boycotting the referendum. In a desperate bid to obtain support from the republics Yeltsin organized a constitutional conference in defiance of parliament where he offered to give them the attributes of sovereign states; their own flags, anthems, and constitutions. In July he presented a draft constitution that would create a "Federation Council" staffed by members from the regions but it was rejected. By 21 September the dispute escalated in to a constitutional crisis when Yeltsin forcefully disbanded the parliament and rebel lawmakers barricaded themselves in the White House where they voted to impeach him. Yeltsin responded by ordering the military to attack the building and arrest the lawmakers on 4 October. The aftermath of the crisis saw Yeltsin dramatically consolidate his power. He began to rule by decree and took steps to quash any opposition. The crisis effectively ended the republics' initiative in negotiations and Yeltsin began to take a stronger line as the federal center was strengthened and many of the privileges given to the republics by the Federation Treaty were taken away. On 15 October Yeltsin ordered that a referendum be conducted on a new constitution, which took place on 12 December. The new constitution was approved but was massively unpopular in the republics, with Tatarstan refusing to recognize its legitimacy. While the Federation Treaty was still de jure in effect, it was for all intents and purposes supplanted by the new constitution, which created a strong presidency, dropped all references to republican sovereignty, and recognized all subjects of the federation as equal.

In the shadow of Yeltsin's power struggle with parliament, negotiations with Tatarstan continued largely uninterrupted until 21 September. After Yeltsin's unexpected victory in the 25 April referendum, Tatarstan rushed to secure as many agreements with him as possible. In June 1993, both signed multiple agreements ranging from oil and petroleum transportation, education, customs duties, and environment. By the end of 1993 most issues had been settled, however, Russia still insisted Tatarstan sign the Federation Treaty which it continued to resist. The two sides ultimately reached a compromise; Russia would abandon its demand the republic sign the treaty while Tatarstan abandoned its demand for more devolved powers. On 15 February 1994 Russia and Tatarstan signed the much anticipated bilateral agreement, called the "Treaty On Delimitation of Jurisdictional Subjects and Mutual Delegation of Powers between the State Bodies of the Russian Federation and the State Bodies of the Republic of Tatarstan". The treaty granted Tatarstan the authority to impose taxes, draft its budget, conduct its own foreign relations and foreign economic activity, and gave the republic control over its land and resources. Other areas of concern fell under joint jurisdiction including the defense industry, monetary policy, duty-free transportation, and law enforcement. The treaty solidified Tatarstan as part of Russia but with "special status".

== Legacy ==
The signing of the bilateral treaty between Russia and Tatarstan would go on to create a domino effect in terms of federal–regional relations. The prestige of such an agreement made other subjects of the federation demand their own special treatment, which Yeltsin obliged, thus making Russia an asymmetrical federation. From 1994 to 1998, Yeltsin signed treaties with 45 other subjects. Such practice of negotiating bilateral treaties faced criticism from other regions and individuals alike, however, Yeltsin defended them saying they kept Russia intact. The referendum itself became largely forgotten by the turn of the century and today is only commemorated by Tatar nationalist groups.

On 31 December 1999, Yeltsin resigned, and was succeeded by Vladimir Putin. Putin set out on reforming the federal system of Russia and to recentralize power to the central government. Among his first acts was to harmonize all regional laws of the country with the Russian constitution. On 27 June 2000 the Constitutional Court ruled that republican constitutions containing declarations of sovereignty were unconstitutional and the Russian government ordered such laws be brought in line with the federal constitution. As a consequence, the vast majority of treaties expired, though Tatarstan continued to negotiate theirs. Tatarstan ignored multiple rulings from the Constitutional Court, which declared "sovereignty" in its constitution null and void, and it continued to maintain clauses on citizenship while also refusing to acknowledge the republic being a "fully-fledged subject of the Russian Federation".

Facing strong pressure from the federal government, Tatarstan amended its constitution on 19 April 2002. The new constitution called Tatarstan a part of Russia and removed references to being a "subject of international law", but still maintained references to "sovereignty" and "self-determination". On 4 July 2003 a federal law was adopted that effectively terminated Tatarstan's bilateral treaty by 2005. Russia and Tatarstan concluded a new bilateral treaty on 26 July 2007 to replace the original one. However, the agreement was substantially weaker and many of the rights afforded to Tatarstan were taken away, leaving it largely symbolic. The new treaty removed all of Tatarstan's privileges in economy and foreign relations, and no longer mentioned "self-determination". On 9 June 2009 the Constitutional Court again ordered that all remaining republics, including Tatarstan, amend their constitutions so as to erase any references to sovereignty, which it eventually complied with. On 24 July 2017 Tatarstan's bilateral agreement expired after the Russian government refused to renew it, ending Tatarstan's special status within the country.

== See also ==
- Parade of sovereignties
- War of Laws
- Dissolution of the Soviet Union

== Sources ==
- Walker, Edward (2003). Dissolution: Sovereignty and the Breakup of the Soviet Union. Rowman & Littlefield. p. 63. ISBN 0-7425-2453-1.
- Hale, Henry (2005). Why Not Parties in Russia?: Democracy, Federalism, and the State. Cambridge University Press. p. 158. ISBN 0-521-84409-6.
- Newton, Julie; Tompson, William (2010). Institutions, Ideas and Leadership in Russian Politics. Palgrave Macmillan. p. 119. ISBN 978-1-349-36232-5.
- George, Julie (2009). The Politics of Ethnic Separatism in Russia and Georgia. Palgrave Macmillan. p. 62. ISBN 978-1-349-37825-8.
- Coyle, James (2017). Russia's Border Wars and Frozen Conflicts. Springer International Publishing. p. 31. ISBN 978-3-319-52204-3.
- Toft, Monica (2003). The Geography of Ethnic Violence: Identity, Interests, and the Indivisibility of Territory. Princeton University Press. p. 53. ISBN 0-691-11354-8.
- Socher, Johannes (2021). Russia and the Right to Self-Determination in the Post-Soviet Space. Oxford University Press. pp. 77–80. ISBN 978-0-19-289717-6.
- Giuliano, Elise (2011). Constructing Grievance: Ethnic Nationalism in Russia's Republics. Cornell University Press. p. 122. ISBN 978-0-8014-4745-7.
- Feldbrugge, Ferdinand; Sharlet, Robert (2005). Public Policy and Law in Russia: In Search of a Unified Legal and Political Space. Koninklijke Brill. p. 46. ISBN 90-04-14916-3.
- Mastny, Vojtech (2005). The Changing Faces of Federalism: Institutional Reconfiguration in Europe from East to West. Manchester University Press. p. 52. ISBN 0-7190-6996-3.
- Roeder, Philip (2007). Where Nation-States Come From: Institutional Change in the Age of Nationalism. Princeton University Press. p. 249. ISBN 978-0-691-12728-6.
- Malik, Hafeez (2000). Russian-American Relations: Islamic and Turkic Dimensions in the Volga-Ural Basin. Palgrave Macmillan. p. 168. ISBN 978-1-349-40761-3.
- Carey, John; Shugart, Matthew (1998). Executive Decree Authority. Cambridge University Press. p. 78. ISBN 0-521-59722-6.
- Pomeranz, William E. (2019). Law and the Russian State: Russia's Legal Evolution from Peter the Great to Vladimir Putin. Bloomsbury Publishing. p. 130. ISBN 978-1-4742-2424-6.
- Black, Larry; DeBardeleben, Joan; Stavrakis, Peter (1997). Beyond the Monolith: The Emergence of Regionalism in Post-Soviet Russia. Woodrow Wilson Center Press. p. 40. ISBN 0-8018-5617-5.
- Jefferies, Ian (2013). The New Russia: A Handbook of Economic and Political Developments. Routledge. p. 347. ISBN 978-0-700-71621-0.
- Burgess, Michael; Pinder, John (2007). Multinational Federations. Routledge. p. 120. ISBN 978-0-415-41490-6.
- Coppieters, Bruno; Sakwa, Richard (2003). Contextualizing Secession: Normative Studies in Comparative Perspective. Oxford University Press. p. 154. ISBN 0-19-925871-6.
- Henderson, Jane (2011). The Constitution of the Russian Federation: A Contextual Analysis. Hart Publishing. p. 100. ISBN 978-1-84113-784-1.
