= Bavlinsky District =

Bavlinsky District Бавлинский район (Russian)
- District

Other transcription(s)
  - Tatar: Баулы районы
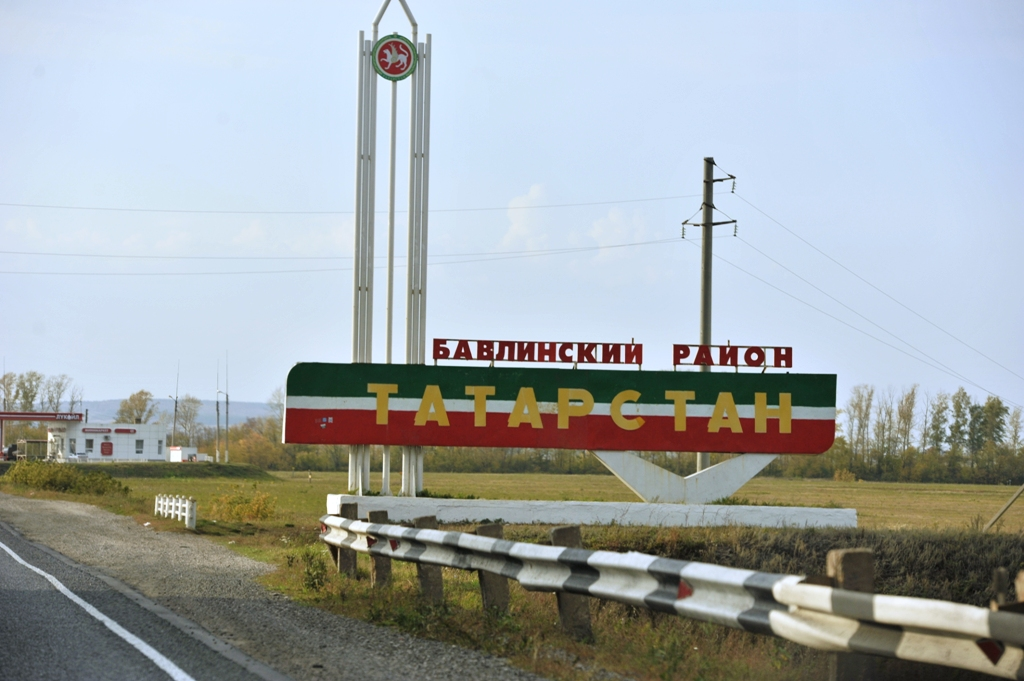
- Entrance to Bavlinsky District

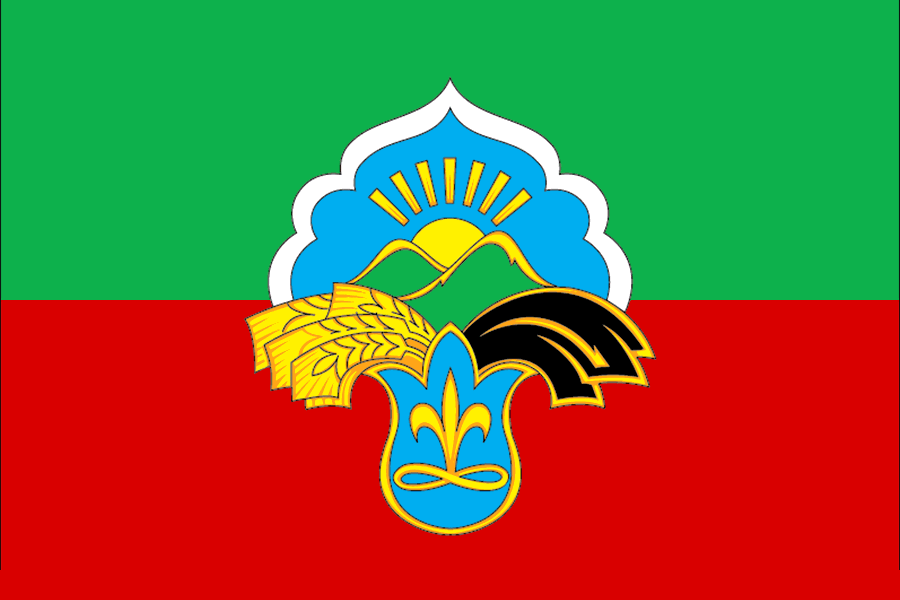
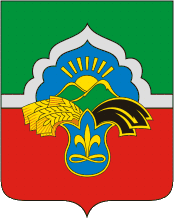
- Flag Coat of arms
- Location of Bavlinsky District in the Republic of Tatarstan
- Coordinates: 54°16′N 53°18′E
- Country: Russia
- Federal subject: Republic of Tatarstan
- Established: 10 August 1930
- Administrative center: Bavly

Area
  - Total: 1,210.4 km^{2} (467.3 sq mi)

Population (2010 Census)
  - Total: 14,161
  - Density: 11.699/km^{2} (30.301/sq mi)
  - Urban: 0%
  - Rural: 100%

Administrative structure
  - Inhabited localities: 39 rural localities

Municipal structure
  - Municipally incorporated as: Bavlinsky Municipal District
  - Municipal divisions: 1 urban settlements, 13 rural settlements
- Time zone: UTC+3 (MSK)
- OKTMO ID: 92614000
- Website: http://bavly.tatarstan.ru/

Bavlinsky District (Russian: Бавлинский райо́н; Tatar: Баулы районы) – is a territorial administrative unit and municipal district of the Republic of Tatarstan within the Russian Federation. The district is located in the south-east of the republic. The administrative center is the city of Bavly. As of 2020, 34,479 people reside in the district.

The first mention of settlements in the region dates back to the 17th century. The Bavlinsky District was formed as part of the Tatar Autonomous Soviet Socialist Republic on August 10, 1930. In 1963 the territories of the district were transferred to Bugulminsky District. Two years later, the Bavlinsky District was reestablished as a separate administrative unit. The administrative center was the village of Bavly.

== Geography ==
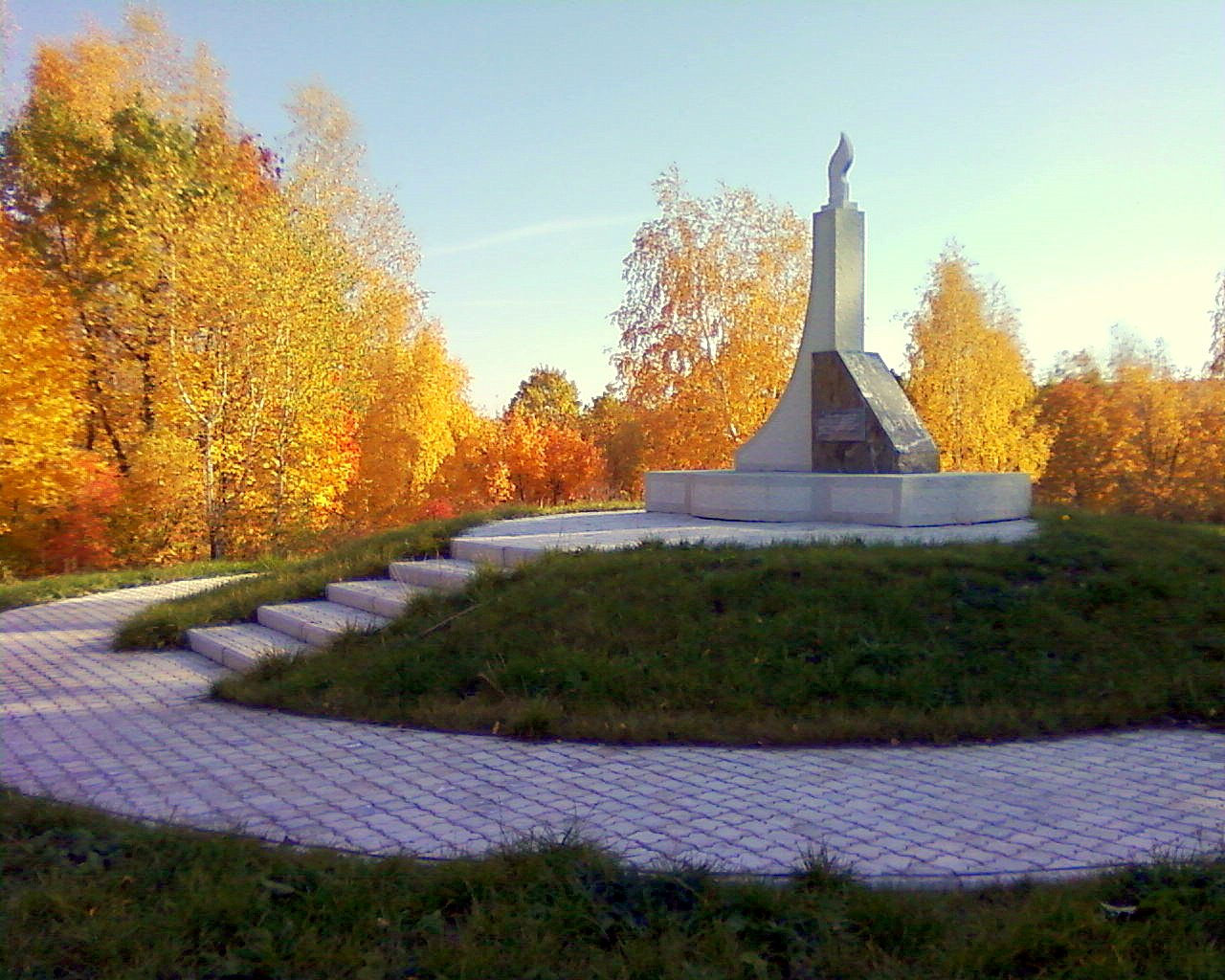
Monument to oil workers in Bavly

The district borders the Bugulma, Yutazinsky, the Republic of Bashkortostan (Yermekeyevsky, Tuimazinsky districts, the Oktyabrsky city district), the Orenburg region (Northern and Abdulinsky districts).

The district's total area is 1222.85 km², of which 913.28 km² is arable land. Chernozems and calcareous soils are widespread.

== Coat of arms and flag ==
The coat of arms of the Bavlinsky District was approved by the Decision of the Municipal Council on October 13, 2006. It is made in the form of a shield, crossed by a narrow silver belt on a green and red field. In the center there is a tulip flower with a golden border, inside of which there is an infinity sign, completed with a golden half of a lily. Three golden spikes and three black fountains continue from the flower. Above them are the green mountains and the rising sun.

Each element of the coat of arms has its own meaning. For instance, a silver belt with a figured rafter is made in the form of a kokoshnik and symbolizes the Slavic culture and peoples. On the other hand, a tulip signifies the unity of Tatarstan and Russia, golden ears and black fountains refer to the resources of the region, and the rising sun refers to the region's belonging to the southeastern part of the Republic of Tatarstan.

The flag of the Bavlinsky region is rectangular in shape and is formed with two equally sized horizontal stripes - green and red, in the middle of which there are figures from the coat of arms.

== History ==
=== Becoming ===
The first settlement on the territory of the present Bavlinsky district appeared in 1626. Its inhabitants lived in dugouts, traces of which have been preserved on the western bank of the Latiip River. It is believed that the pioneers - Yrys, Karman, Bibuldy - received official permission from Tsar Alexis of Russia to settle these territories in 1658. At the end of the 18th century, there were 34 households in Bavly with a population of about 200 people. On the whole the settlers largely consisted of Bashkirs and Yasak Tatars. These early settlers largely engaged in agriculture, animal husbandry, and trade. By the end of the 19th century, the number of farms in the settlement had increased to 274, and the Bavlinskaya volost consisted of eight adjacent villages.

From 1850 to 1920 the territory of the region belonged to the Bugulma district of the Samara Governorate. From 1920 to 1930 it was a part of the Bugulma canton of the Tatar Autonomous Soviet Socialist Republic (TASSR). The districts were formed as independent administrative entities within the TASSR on August 10, 1930. As a result of the major territorial reform in 1965 initiated by the Presidium of the Supreme Soviet, the territories of Bavlinsky district were transferred to Bugulminsky District, but already on January 12, 1965, the Bavlinsky district would be reestablished with the village of Bavly as its administrative center.

=== Oil Industry ===
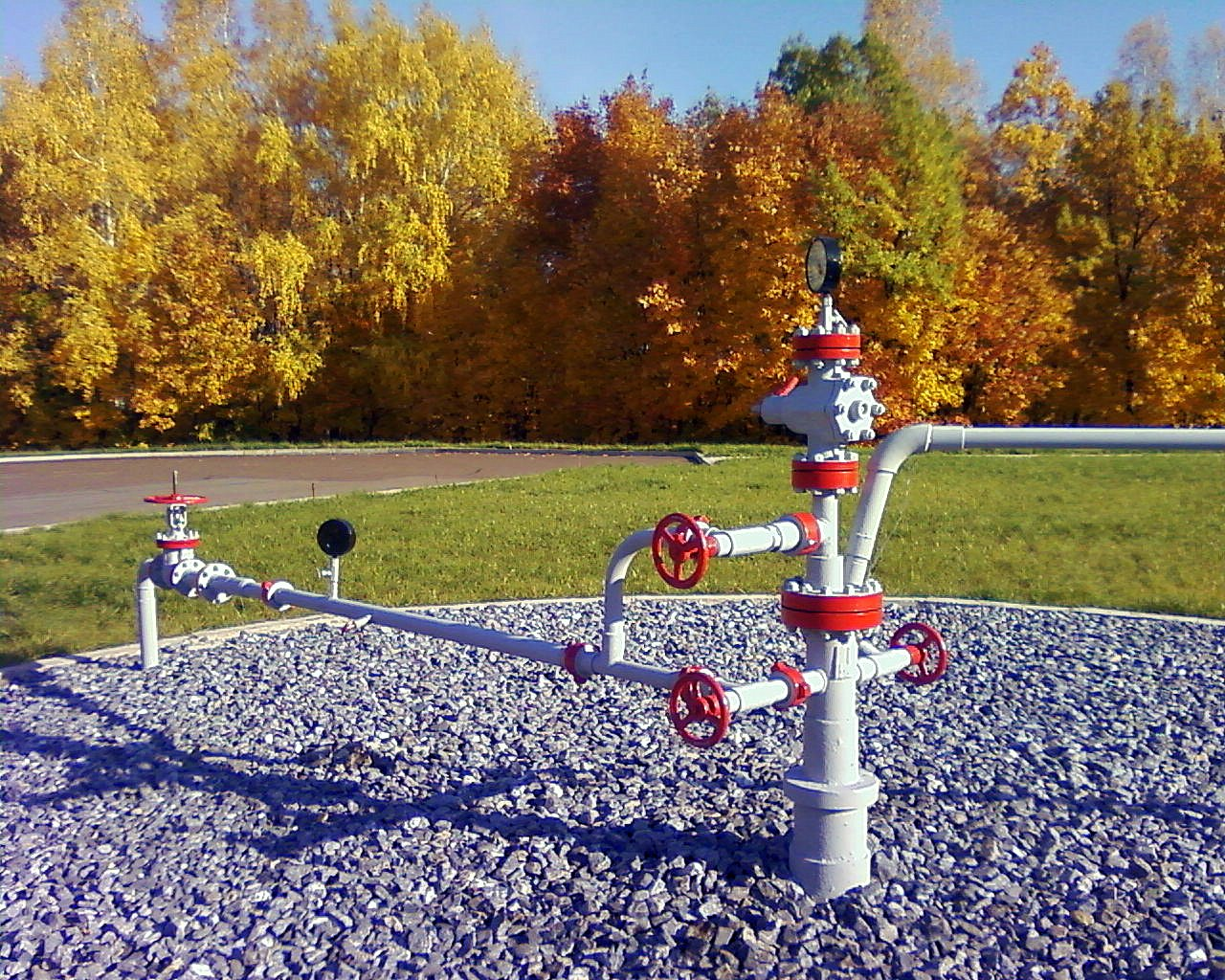
Well 1, 2008

A new stage in the development of the region began in September 1946, when Devonian oil fields were discovered on Mount Gali. In the same year, 1,300 tons of oil were produced from well No. 1 and delivered to the state. A year later, oil began to be produced on an industrial scale. For this reason, the Bavlinsky oil field was created and in the spring of 1948 two more wells were put into operation. In 1950, the Bavlyneft trust was established on the basis of the oil field.

In 1966, the well was mothballed, the site was landscaped and a memorial plaque was installed. Oil production was restored there only on June 5, 2007.

The development of the oil industry contributed to the active growth of agriculture in the region. It also had an impact on the development of infrastructure that led to the influx of workers from all over the country. On September 18, 1997, Bavly was given the status of a city of federal subject significance by a decree of the State Council of the Republic.

== Population ==
As of 2020, 34 479 people resided in the district. Of them, 22,157 live in urban settlements and 12,322 reside in rural areas. The ethnic composition of the district population consists of Tatars, Russians, Chuvash, Udmurt and representatives of other nationalities.

== Municipal-administrative structure ==
Since 2014, the head of the municipal district has been Ramil Gatiyatullin. The Executive Committee is headed by Ilya Guzairov. There is 1 urban, and 13 rural settlements as well as 40 settlements in the composition of the Bavlinsky district.

== Economy ==
=== State of the economy ===
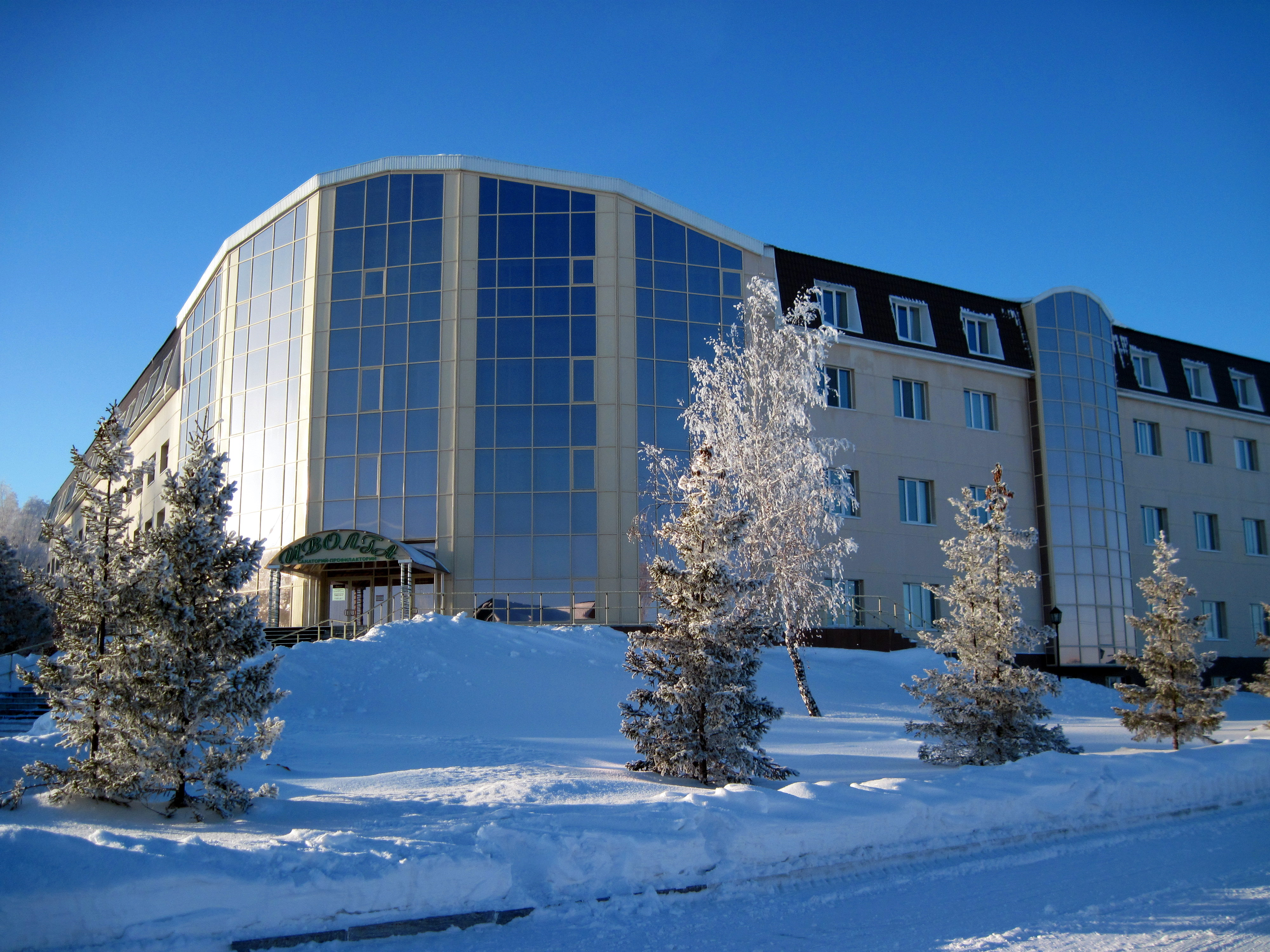
Ivolga sanatorium

As of 2020, the Bavlinsky District ranks 15th out of 44 in the rating of the republic's districts in terms of quality of life. The rating was formed on the basis of local budget revenues, average monthly salaries, level of infrastructure development, investment in fixed assets and other indicators.

There are 174 small businesses and 603 entrepreneurs registered in the district. As of January 1, 2020, the registered unemployment rate was 0.6%. The volume of the gross regional product in 2019 amounted to 43.5 billion rubles (as compared to 41.9 and 31.9 million rubles in 2018 and 2017 respectively).

=== Industry ===
Bavlinsky District is one of the oldest oil-producing regions of the Republic of Tatarstan and production is carried out throughout the entire territory of the region. The main oil enterprises in the district are “Bavlyneft” and “Aloil”, as well as branches of the enterprises “Tatneft”, “Tatneft AZS Center”, “Tatneft-Kabel” and the Bavlyneft oil and gas production department. Most of these entitites were formed after the discovery of the Bavlinskoye oil field in 1946 and became one of the first oil and gas production departments in the republic. Due to further geological investigations, the total area of the field has drastically increased. Nowadays it is one of the largest in the country and contains around 100-1000 million tons of oil reserves.

In addition to oil production, other industries are well developed in the region, including a forestry enterprise, Bavlinsky bakery, Bikterra (a workshop for the production of expanded clay blocks, woodworking and workwear), and Sadykov's peasant farm, which produces milk and dairy products.

=== Agriculture ===
Agricultural land occupies 71 thousand hectares of the district, including 52.2 thousand hectares of arable land. The main agricultural specialization of the region is grain production and dairy and meat cattle breeding. Additional industries include the production of animal feed, pig farming, sheep farming, horse breeding, and beekeeping. The average annual grain harvest is 60 thousand tons. The agro-industrial complex of the region is represented by 18 agricultural enterprises and 54 farms. The main cultivated grain crops are wheat, hordeum, avena, pisum, fagopyrum, and panicum. Main livestock industry sectors include cattle, sheep, horse, as well as goose farming. The largest enterprises in the region are Bavlinsky Khlebozavod, Agrokhimservis and Bavlinskaya PMK Melioration, as well as a number of others.

=== Investment potential ===
In 2019, the district's investment in fixed assets from all sources of financing amounted to 4 billion rubles. The following investment projects are being undertaken in the district: the "Beginner Farmer" and "Family Farm" programs, the creation of a vegetable-growing complex for the cultivation, storage and sale of vegetables raised in the open field, as well as funds also being directed with the goal of the development of ecotourism in the district.

Two industrial parks, Agropark with an area of 40,000 m2 and the industrial site of Aleksandrovsky Distillery with a footprint of 76,989 m2 were launched to support small and medium-sized businesses 2019.

=== Transport ===
Bavly is located at the intersection of the transport routes Moscow -Chelyabinsk, Samara - Ufa and R-239 Kazan - Orenburg. The M-5 "Ural" highway with a length of 25.5 km also crosses through the district. Additionally part of the route of the Western Europe - Western China highway is being developed in the southwest of the district.

The railway line Urussu - Oktyabrsky of the Kuybyshev Railway was crosses through the extreme north-east of the region. In the north-east of the district is the inoperative Oktyabrsky Airport.

== Landmarks ==
There are four specially protected natural areas on the territory of the Bavlinsky district:

- Salikhovskaya Mountain is a 3 km long ridge of hills along the left bank of the Kandyz River tributary. This territory of 30 hectares in size received the status of a natural monument of regional importance in April 1989.
- The Ik River, a tributary of the Kama had its status as a natural monument approved by a resolution of the Council of Ministers of the TASSR dated January 10, 1978. The length of the river is 436 km with a depth of 0.5–3.0 m. The river has economic and cultural significance to the district and its residents.
- Another river with the status of a natural monument is a tributary of the Ika, the Dymka River. Despite a lack of water flow, its length is 85.7 km. The river has been protected since January 1978.
- The Bugulma state hunting reserve encompasses a total area of 45.9 thousand hectares, including forest lands of 13.6 thousand hectares, field lands - 32.1 thousand hectares and wetlands of 200 hectares. The main nature conservation aim of the reserve is the restoration and preservation of the population of capreolus and bobak marmot in the Zakamsk ecological-geographical zone of the Republic of Tatarstan.

== Culture and society ==
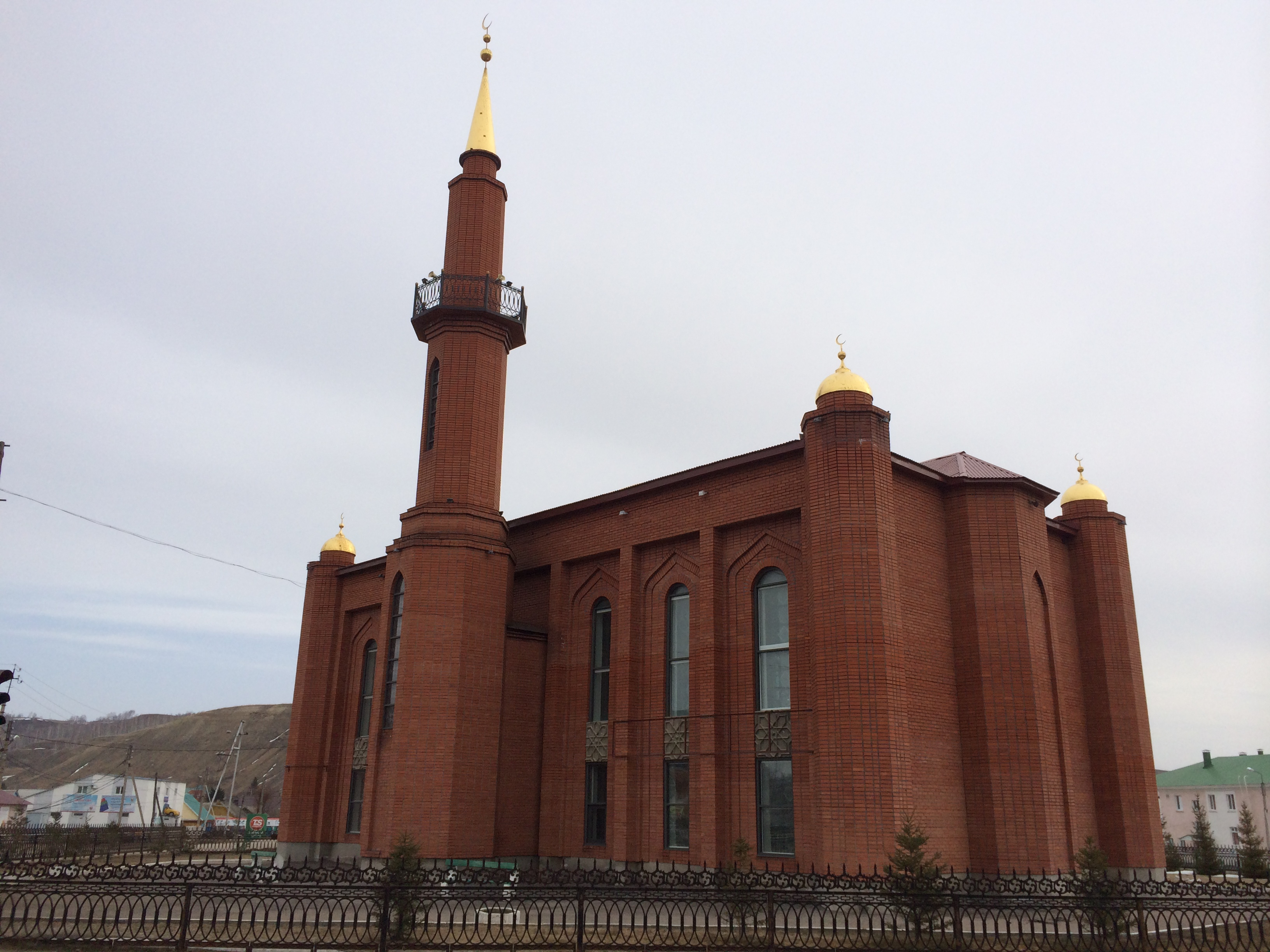
Central mosque "Gali"

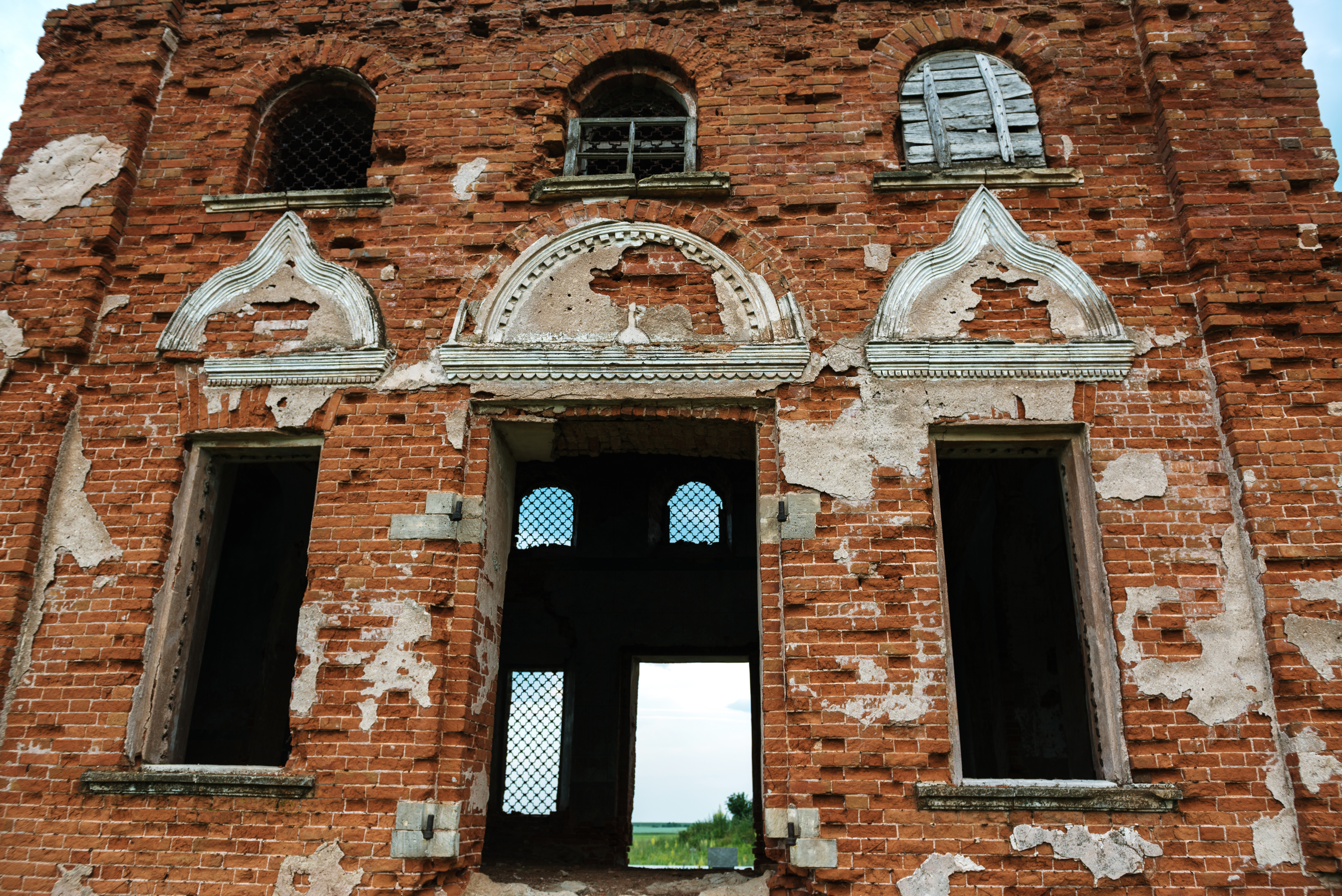
Trinity Church in Ivanovka

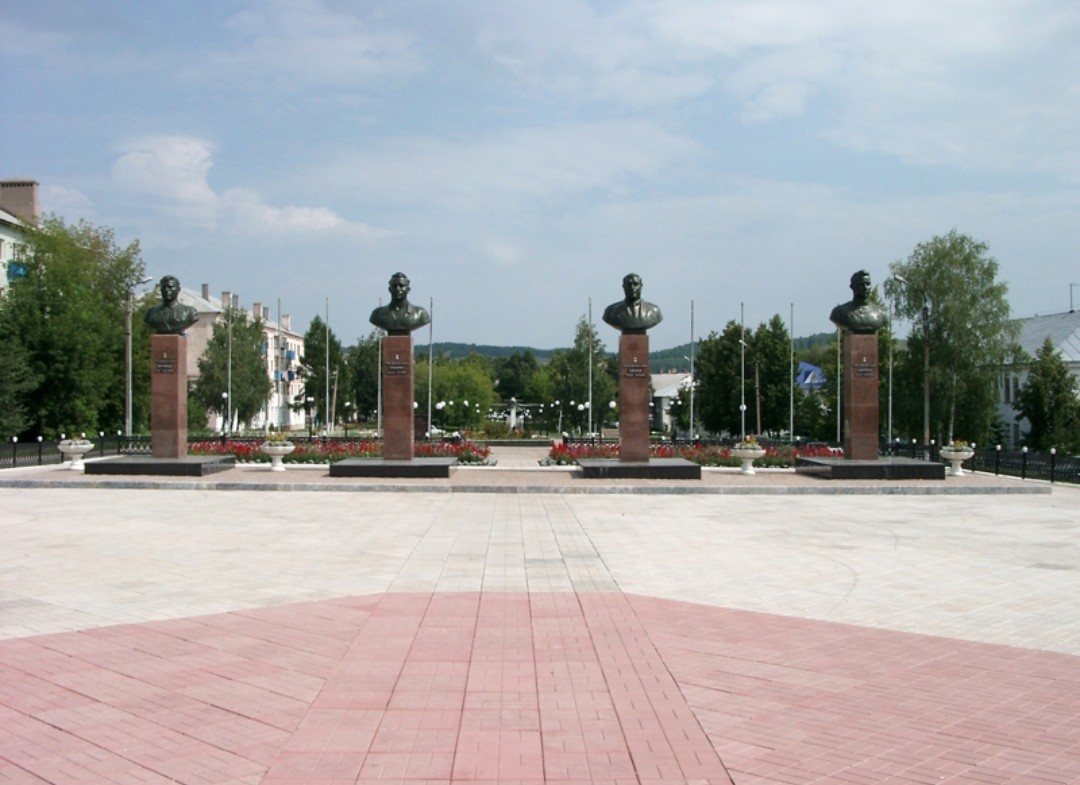
Memorial complex Bavly

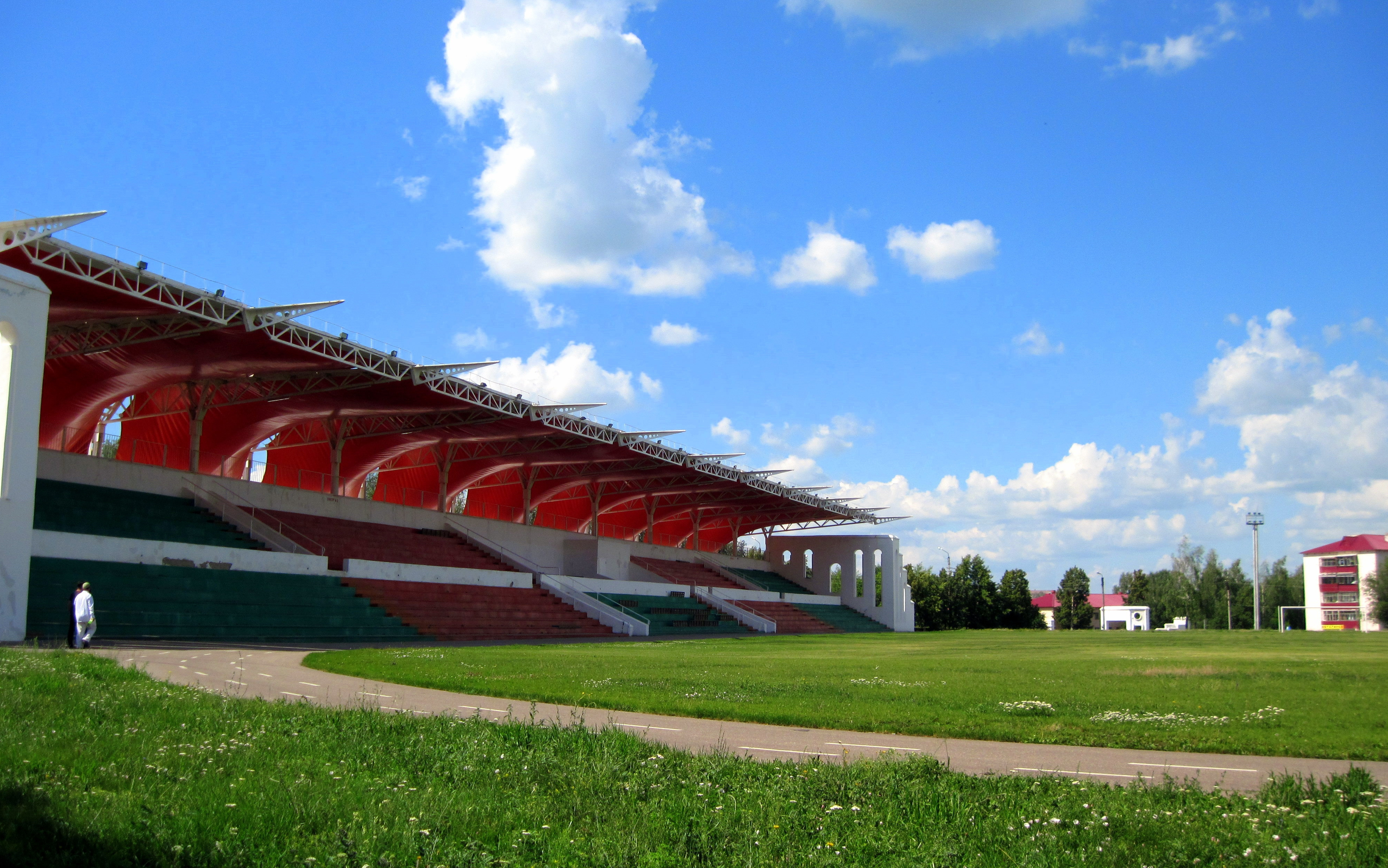
Stadium "Neftche"

The education sector of the Bavlinsky municipal district includes 40 institutions serving students of different levels and ages including: 20 general education schools, 18 kindergartens, the Bavlinsky agricultural college and an interschool educational complex.

In 2018, the district won a grant of 75 million rubles in the All-Russian competition for the best projects for creating a comfortable urban environment thanks to the project of the Neftche culture and recreation park in the city of Bavly. A total of 153 million rubles were spent on the project. Parks of Victory and Labor Glory are among those in line for improvement.
