= Bugulminsky District =

Bugulminsky District Бугульминский район (Russian)
- District

Other transcription(s)
  - Tatar: Бөгелмә районы
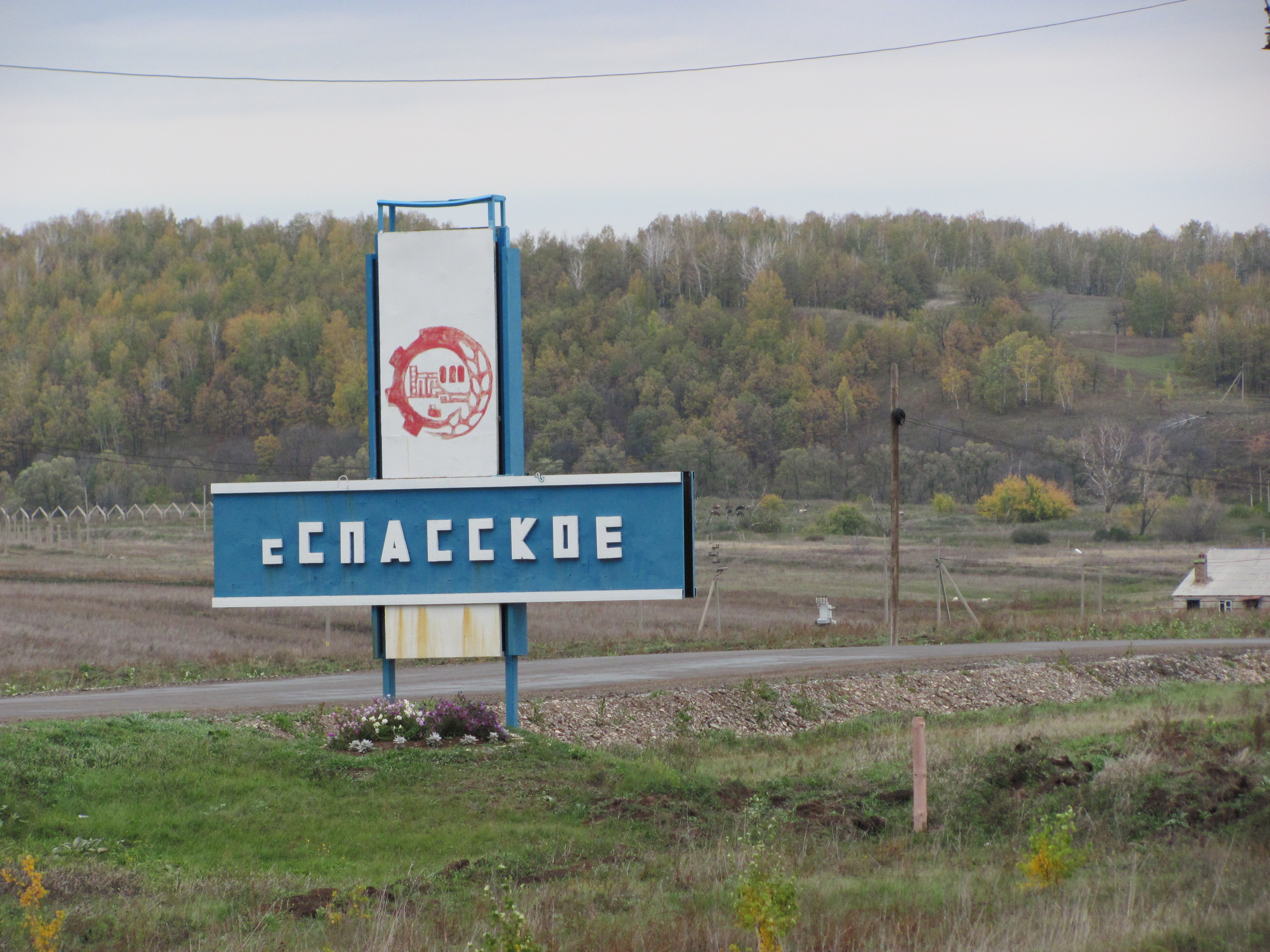
- Highway in Bugulminsky District

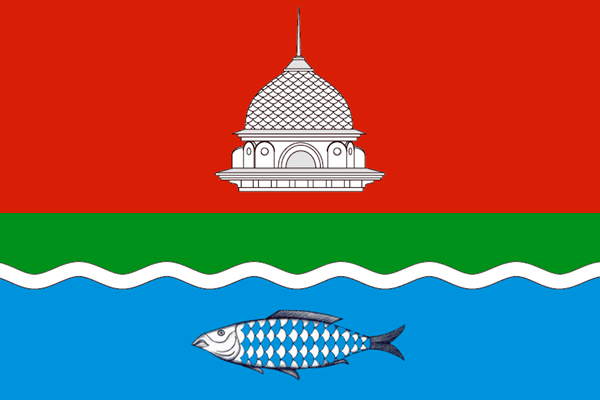
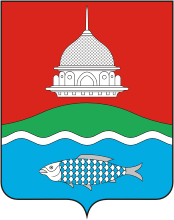
- Flag Coat of arms
- Location of Bugulminsky District in the Republic of Tatarstan
- Coordinates: 54°32′N 52°52′E
- Country: Russia
- Federal subject: Republic of Tatarstan
- Established: 10 August 1930
- Administrative center: Bugulma

Area
  - Total: 1,408.6 km^{2} (543.9 sq mi)

Population (2010 Census)
  - Total: 22,261
  - Density: 15.804/km^{2} (40.931/sq mi)
  - Urban: 22.5%
  - Rural: 77.5%

Administrative structure
  - Inhabited localities: 1 urban-type settlements, 63 rural localities

Municipal structure
  - Municipally incorporated as: Bugulminsky Municipal District
  - Municipal divisions: 2 urban settlements, 17 rural settlements
- Time zone: UTC+3 (MSK)
- OKTMO ID: 92617000
- Website: http://bugulma.tatarstan.ru/

Bugulminsky District (Russian: Бугульми́нский райо́н; Tatar: Бөгелмә районы) is an territorial administrative unit and municipality of the Republic of Tatarstan within the Russian Federation. The district is located in the southeastern part of the republic and occupies an area of 1,408.6 square kilometers (543.9 sq mi). According to the 2010 census, the municipality had a population of 22,261 people. The main city Bugulma is not included within the administrative structure of the district.

The main city derived its name from the Bugulminka River. The settlement on the site of the modern city was first mentioned in the sources of 1736. In imperial Russia, the Bugulminsky county (uyezd) was part of the Orenburg and later Samara provinces. In 1920, the county was renamed to Bugulminsky canton within the Tatar ASSR. In August, 1930, the canton was divided into several districts, including Bugulminsky.

== Geography and Climate ==
Bugulmisky district is located in the south-east of Tatarstan. It shares borders with Aznakaevsky, Almetyevsky, Bavlinsky, Leninogorsky and Yutazinsky districts of the republic, as well as Samara (Klyavlinsky district) and Orenburg (Northern district) regions. The total area is 1405 km^{2}.

The area is located on the Bugulma plateau, and the height ranges here from 200 to 300 meters. Among the regional rivers are Bugulminsky Zay, Stepnoy Zay, Dymka and Sula. The climate is temperate continental with humid summers and moderately cold winters. The district is home to 913 plant species and 294 animal species, some of which are listed in the Red Book of Tatarstan. There are natural reserves and wildlife sanctuaries in the region. Among the specially protected are the Adonis Forest and Novo-Aleksandrovsky Slope reserves, Karabash Mountain, Tatarsko-Dymskaya Polyana and the Yutaza River, as well as ancient archaeological sites.

== Flag and Coat of Arms ==
In February 2007, the Council of the Bugulminsky municipal district approved its new heraldic insignia. The visual design of the coat of arms includes a white dome with a steeple standing on a green hill and set against a red background. At the base of the canvas is placed a blue stripe with the image of a fish and a thin white stripe running over it.

The red background, green hill and a white stripe reflect the national colors of Tatarstan. The blue stripe with fish represents the abundance of the local river resources, and the white (silver) stripe symbolizes the Bugulminka River. The green hill defines the natural landscape of the region and is an allegory for agricultural growth. The openwork dome symbolically acknowledges the region's religious and ethnic diversity and emphasizes its historical and cultural heritage. The flag is based on heraldic elements of the coat of arms, with the exception of the green stripe, which is depicted as a straight and not a hilly line.

== Etymology ==
Bugulminsky district derived its name from the main city of Bugulma. As the geographer Yevgeny Pospelov states, the first settlement was founded in 1736 at the confluence of the Bugulma River (now Bugulminka) into the Zai River. The hydronym “Bugulme”, which gave the name to the settlement and the region, comes from the Tatar word for “twist”, “bend”.

== History ==
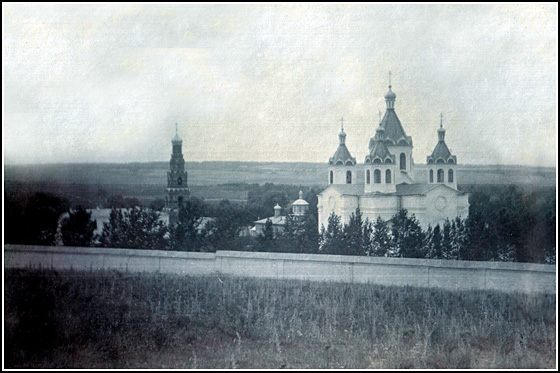
Bugulminsky Alexander Nevsky Monastery and Holy Trinity Church with Bell Tower

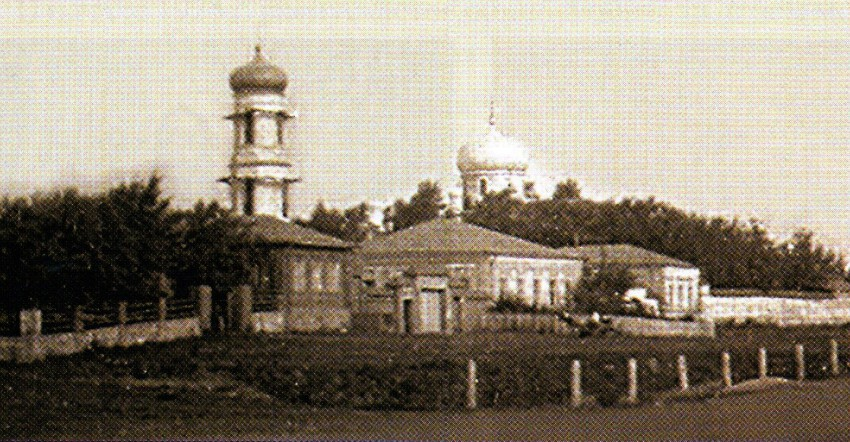
Kazansko-Bogoroditsky Bugulmisnsky Nunnery

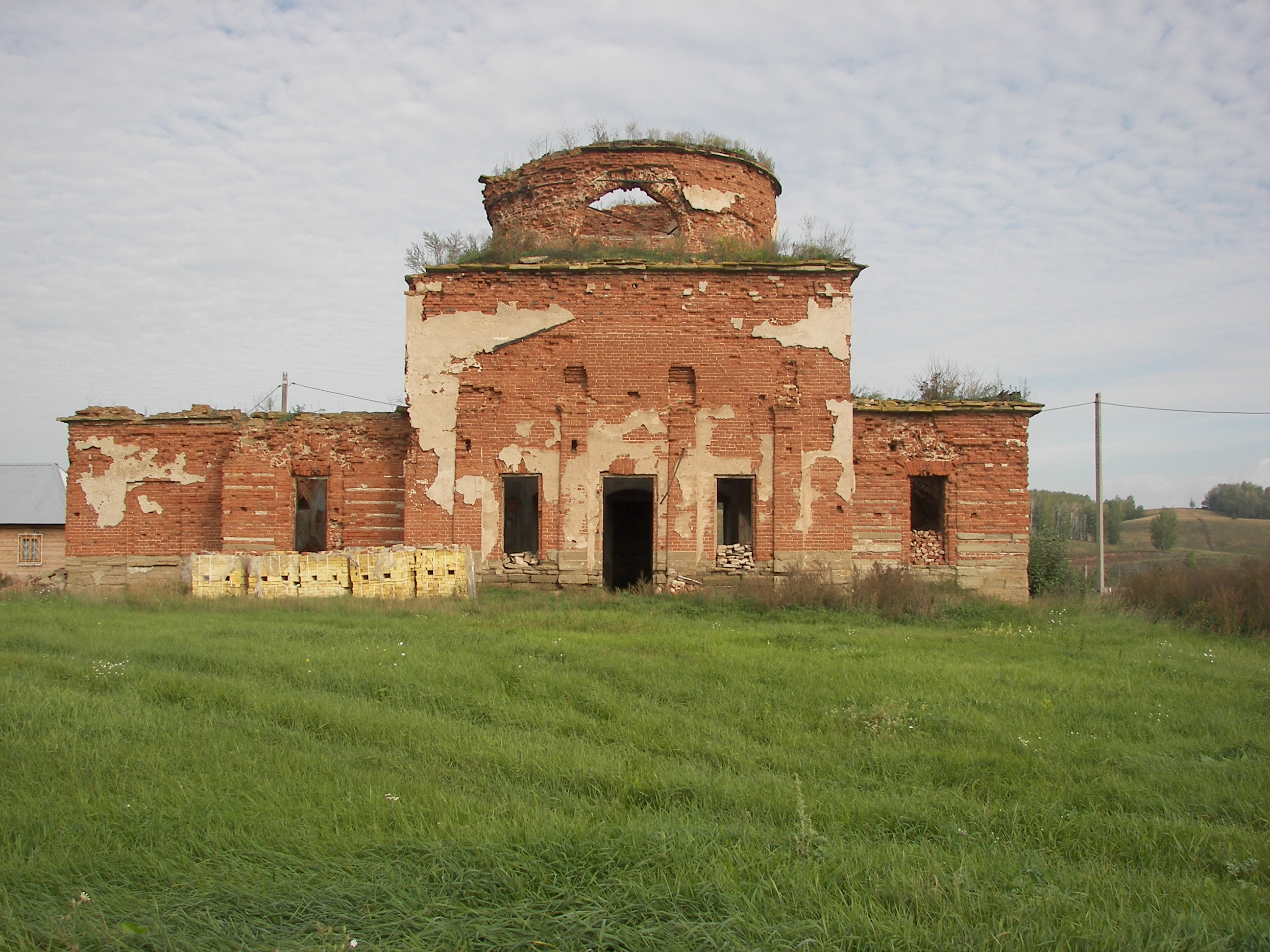
Church of Sts. Peter and Paul in the Klyuchi village

The southeast of modern Tatarstan bordered on the Nogai Horde and until the 1630s nomadic peoples moved across the steppe. After the Nogai were driven back, the ethnically diverse population continued to be small in number and was often subjected to Kalmyk raids. According to historian Aydar Nogmanov, only after the Bashkir uprising of 1704-1711 was suppressed, farmers began to move to the South-Eastern Trans-Kama region. The Bugulma settlement was first mentioned in the historical records in 1736, and over the next decades, its population grew rapidly. In the 1740s, Bugulma was recognized as the administrative center of nearby villages. Historians tend to attribute this rise to the proximity of important trade and postal routes, as well as to the growth of the non-Russian population over which the tsarist government sought to establish its control. In 1744, Bugulma was placed under the Senate rule, and the region became a place of exile. During the Pugachev's Rebellion of 1773–1775, the imperial headquarters for confronting the rebels was located in Bugulma. Thus, in the 18th century, the Bugulminskaya Sloboda became an important outpost of the Russian Empire for governing its Trans-Kama colonies.

Due to its political status and national composition, the region often changed its territorial organization. In 1781, Bugulma received the status of the county (uyezd) town and, along with surrounding lands, entered the jurisdiction of the Ufa governorship. In 1796, the newly formed Bugulminsky uyezd was included into the Orenburg province, and in half a century it passed to the Samara province.

According to the historian Alsu Mukhametdinova, at the end of the 18th century, the Bugulminsky uyezd numbered 170 villages and small towns, and by the mid-19th century, their number increased to 335. As of the general population census of 1897, the county population was about 300 thousand people of various religions and nationalities. About 47% of the locals identified themselves as Russians; 30% as Bashkirs; 15% were Tatars; and the rest of the population was represented by the Chuvashes, Mordovians and other ethnic groups.

In 1917, the Soviets seized power in Tatarstan. Bugulma was one of the battlefields during the Civil War, and the town was changed hands several times between the belligerents' armies. In 1918, the Red Army confronted the Czechoslovak units, and in 1919 they armed against White military leader Alexander Kolchak. During this time, the celebrated Czech writer Jaroslav Hašek served in Bugulma as an assistant commandant and wrote there a number of satirical works. Since 1966, the writer's museum has been operating in the city honoring his literary works. In 1919, the Bugulma peasants raised a large anti-Bolshevik uprising that swept many of the surrounding regions but was soon brutally suppressed. In 1920, the Bugulminsky uyezd was transformed into the cognominal canton (kanton) within the Tatar ASSR. A year later, a severe famine broke out in the Volga region affecting the lives and killing several millions of people. Only in Bugulma and its lands, more than 35 thousand inhabitants died of hunger.

During the 20th century, the region's borders changed several times. In 1930, the canton's territory was divided into Almetyevsky, Bavlinsky, Bugulminsky, Tumutuksky and Shugurovsky districts. In 1963, the territories of the Bavlinsky and Yutazinsky districts were once again incorporated into Bugulma whose area expanded to 3924 km^{2}, and the population grew over 71 thousand people. Two years later, the districts were reorganized again, and the area of the Bugulminsky district peaked 1419 km^{2}. In 1974, the general plan of Bugulma was designed and the city was rebuilt.

== Administrative and Municipal Status ==
Within the framework of administrative divisions, Bugulminsky District is one of the forty-three in the republic. The town of Bugulma serves as its administrative center, despite being incorporated separately as a town of republic significance —an administrative unit with the status equal to that of the districts. As a municipal division, the district is incorporated as Bugulminsky Municipal District, with the town of republic significance of Bugulma being incorporated within it as Bugulma Urban Settlement. In urban areas (the city of Bugulma and Karabash), 83.57% of the population of the region live. The ethnic composition of the region is represented by 56.6% of Russians, 35.4% of Tatars, 2.5% of Chuvashs, and 2.3% of Mordvins.

== Economy ==
=== 18th-20th centuries ===
During the 18th and 19th centuries, the economics of the Volga region was based on agriculture, animal husbandry and trade. The main agricultural crops were rye, wheat, buckwheat, millet, poppy and others. Historian Khalida Bagautdinova points out that forests played a very important role in the Tatar economy, and logging was used to heat homes and build houses and outbuildings, although it caused frequent fires. Due to its advantageous geographical location on the road from Ufa and Orenburg to Kazan, Bugulma became an important provincial trade center of the era. Throughout the 19th century, bazaars and fairs were regularly held in Bugulminsky uyezd, and one of them—Vozdvizhenskaya—was the largest in the region. In addition to trade and agriculture, a number of important industries such as distilleries, tannery and cloth factories, were located here. In 1911, the Volga-Bugulma railway was held in the district, and in 1937 the airport was opened.

The 20th century brought significant changes in the way of life and the economy of the region. The devastating years of the Revolution and the Civil War negatively affected the economy and led to the decline of agriculture. A severe famine broke out in 1921-1922 followed by the years of relief during the NEP. However, the situation changed dramatically in the late 1920s, which were characterized by forced collectivization and the Bolshevik attack against the traditional way of life. Post–World War II period was characterized by urbanization and the development of the oil industry in Tatarstan. In 1948, one of the world's largest oil deposits, “Romashkino” was discovered 20 km from Bugulma. In the 1950s, the Tatneft group was established in Bugulma and the Tatar Oil Research and Design Institute (TatNIPIneft) was opened and gave impetus to the city's development. In a short time, the population of the city increased tenfold, and until the end of the 1960s, Bugulma remained the second largest city in the republic.

=== Current Situation ===
Currently, Bugulma is a large industrial hub of the Republic of Tatarstan, and the oil industry plays a special role in the regional economy. Among the largest enterprises operating in oilfield services are TNG-Group, Tatneft, Bugulminskii Mekhanicheskii Zavod (Bugulma Mechanical Plant), Bugulminskii Elektronasosnyi Zavod (Bugulma Electric Pump Plant), Bugulminskii Opytnyi Zavod Nefteavtomatiki (Bugulma Experimental Oil Automation Plant), Zavod Zhelezobetonnykh Izdelii (Reinforced Concrete Products Plant), Novye Tekhnologii Ekspluatatsii Skvazhin (New Well Operation Technologies) and plants. In 2017, the research and production company Gazovye Kompleksnye Sistemy (Gas Integrated Systems) launched a new workshop for the production of large-sized equipment in Bugulma, the investment of which amounted to more than 100 million rubles. In addition to these, the regional industry includes a garment factory, a brick factory and other large companies. In total, the share of industrial companies in the gross regional product is about 30%. In order to diversify risks, the administration supports the development of food production enterprises, for example, bakery plants, a dairy and a meat processing plant operate here.

=== Investment Potential ===
The administration's focus on the development of the agricultural sector attracts new investors to the regional economy. Large companies and enterprises, whose workforce varies from 400 to 6000 people, are involved in the innovation activity of the Bugulminsky district. In the previous decade, the largest investments fell on mechanical engineering (about 45%) and geological exploration (21%); in the appliance industry and scientific research, the share of investments constituted 12% and 17%, respectively. From 2008 to 2010, the lowest investments were made in the food industry— about 0.2% of the total. Since 2010, the Bugulma administration has been focusing on diversifying the economy, developing the food industry, as well as attracting federal and international capital to the region. Economists point out that the gross regional product of the Bugulma region is growing by 5-6% annually, and the unemployment rate is generally below the republican average. In 2017, the production volume of the district amounted to 15 billion rubles.

=== Transport ===
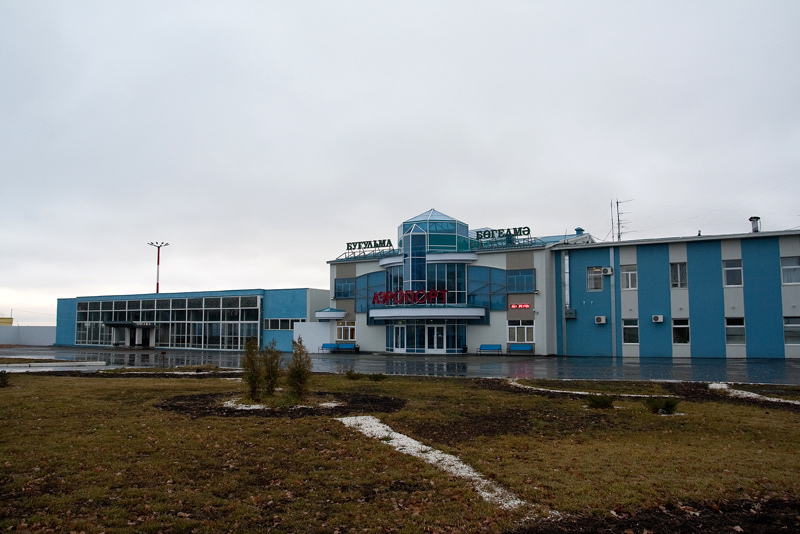
Bugulma Airport

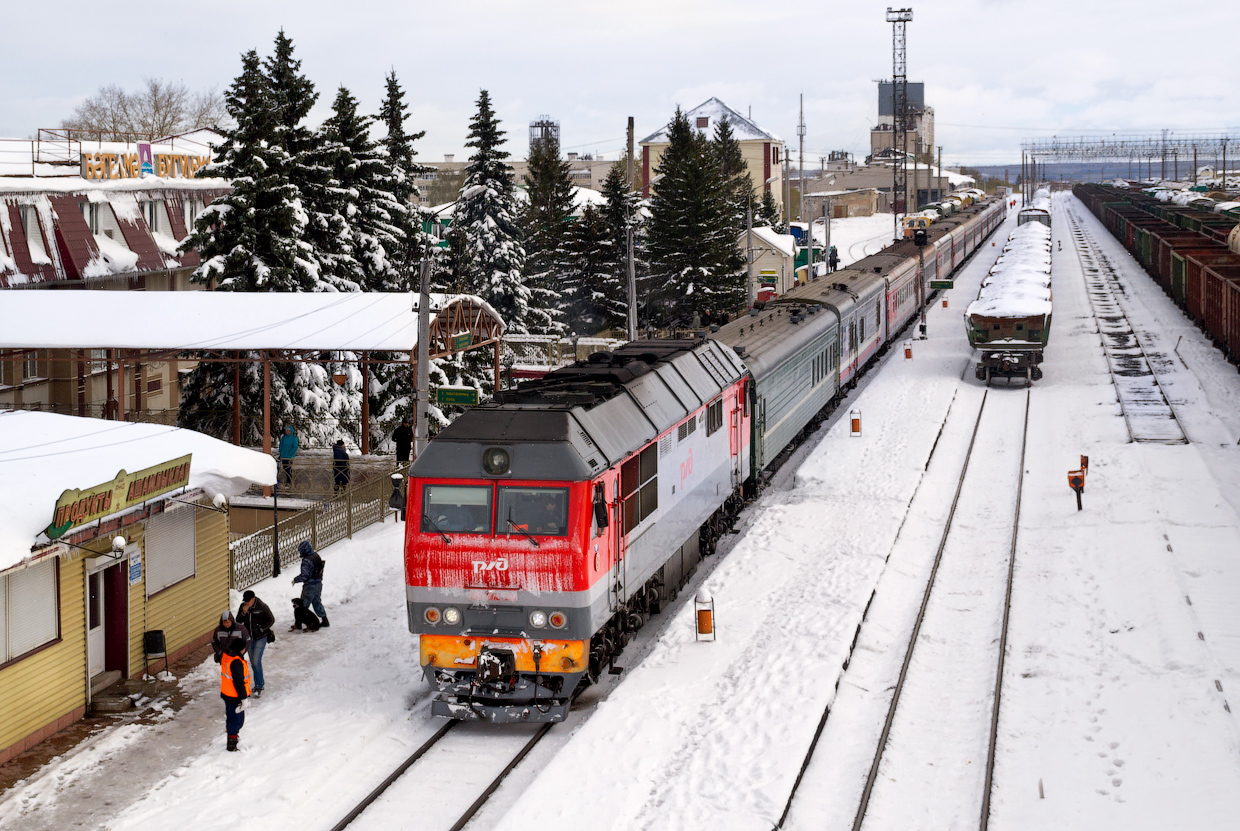
Bugulma station

Bugulma is located 333 km southeast of Kazan, 257 km from Samara and 230 km from Ufa. There is a railway junction on the Ulyanovsk—Ufa line, as well as a number of highways: R-239 Kazan—Orenburg—border with Kazakhstan; M-5 “Ural” Moscow—Samara—Chelyabinsk; 16K-0606 Bugulma—Leninogorsk; 16K-0078 Bugulma—Aznakayevo; 16K-0607 Karabash (R-239)—Leninogorsk. In the south of the district, a part of the international highway is being built which will connect Western Europe to Western China. To the north of Bugulma is the regional airport “Bugulma” connecting the cities of the Almetyevsk agglomeration.

== Social Welfare and Public Life ==
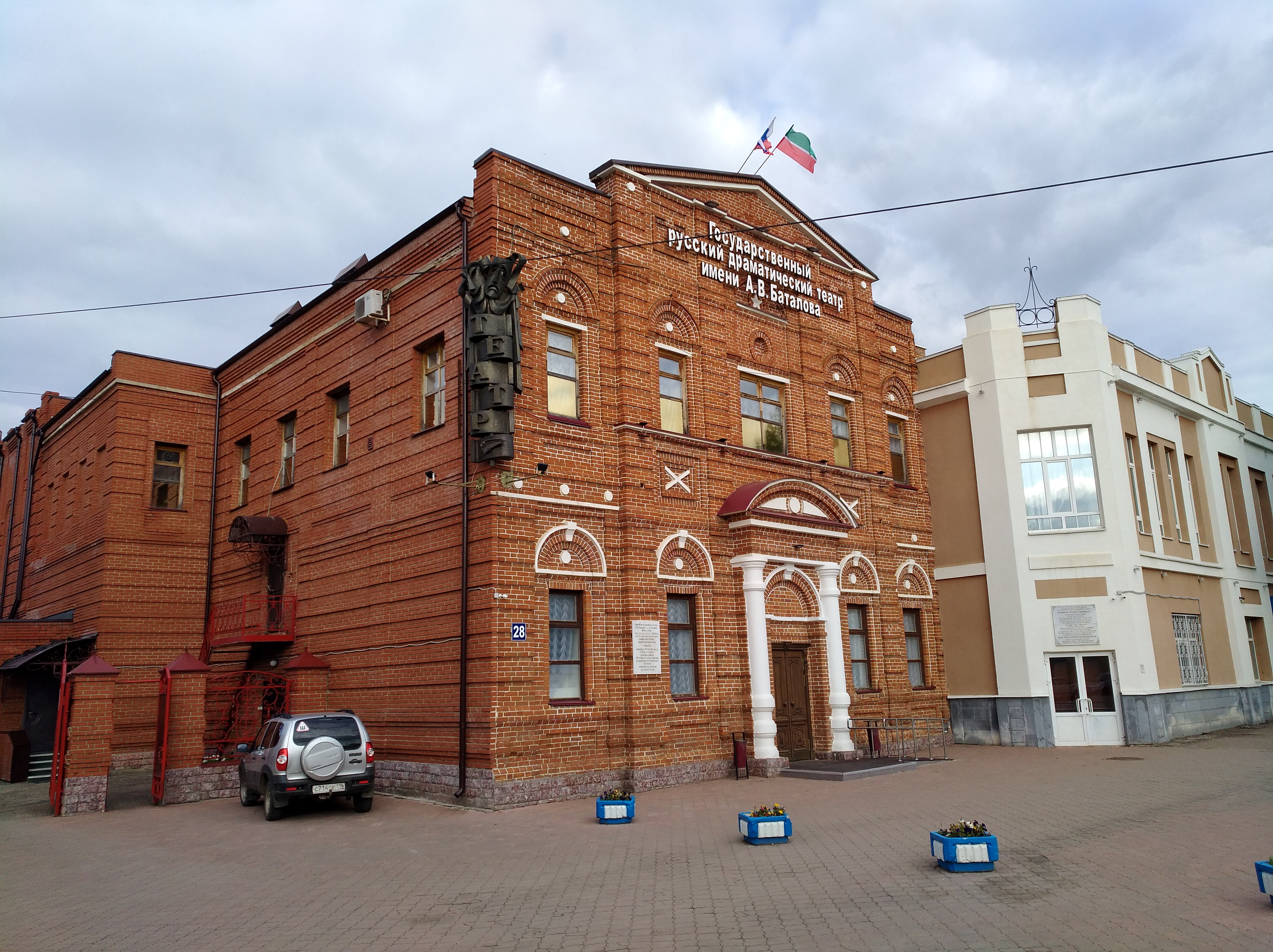
Drama Theater

The growth in oil production and refining has determined the rise of Bugulma as a regional center for scientific and educational activities in the search and development of oil and gas fields, the construction of wells and equipment. Founded in 1956, TatNIPIneft is the largest scientific center of the oil industry in the south-east of Tatarstan.

As of 2020, there is a branch of the Kazan National Research Technological University, the Scientific and Technological Center of the Ural-Volga Region, and a number of secondary educational institutions in Bugulma and its region. The sports infrastructure includes such large facilities as the Energetik stadium with a ski lodge and the Yubileiny Ice Palace. Since 1935, the Bugulma State Russian Drama Theater named after Alexei Batalov has been operating. Additionally, the Bugulma Museum of Local Lore and the Literary Memorial Museum of Yaroslav Gashek are open in the Bugulminsky district.

Bugulminsky district is home to more than 50 nationalities, some of which have their own churches and schools in national languages. Regional newspapers “Bugelmu avazy” ("Voice of Bugulma") and “Bugulminskaya Gazeta” are published in Tatar and Russian languages.

== Attractions ==
Many historical monuments and sights have been preserved in the city and the region, among them:

- Bugulma Museum of Local Lore
- Literary Memorial Museum of Yaroslav Hasek and monuments to the writer and his famous protagonist, the good soldier Švejk
- House of the merchant Sh. Khakimov
- Estate of local historian Pyotr Rychkov in the Spasskoe village
- Memorial “Eternal Honor” with Eternal Flame
- Memorial complex and obelisk of the 352nd Orsha division of the Great Patriotic War.

== Bibliography ==
- Gallyamova, A. G. (2014). Istoriia Tatarstana i tatarskogo naroda, 1917-2013 gg.: Uchebnoe posobie [History of Tatarstan and the Tatar people, 1917-2013: A Textbook]. Kazan: Kazan Federal University.
- Gusarov, D.N.; Gusarova, L.V. (2011). "Analiz problem innovatcionno-investitcionnogo potentciala malykh gorodov Rossii (na primere Bugulminskogo munitcipalnogo raiona Respubliki Tatarstan) [Analysis of the problems of the innovation and investment potential of small towns in Russia (on the example of the Bugulminsky municipal district of the Republic of Tatarstan)]". Strategiia Razvitiia Ekonomiki. 40 (133): 21–28.
- Khasanov, M., ed. (2002). Tatarskaia entciklopediia [Tatar Encyclopedia]. Kazan: Institut Tatarskoi Entciklopedii. pp. 471–472.
- Leonteva, O.B. (2013). "Natcionalnyi sostav naseleniia Samarskoi gubernii vo vtoroi polovine XIX v. po dannym statisticheskikh istochnikov [The Ethnic Composition of the Population of the Samara Province in the Second Half of the Nineteenth Century Based on Statistical Sources]". Vestnik Samarskogo Universiteta. Istoriia, Pedagogika, Filologiia. 19 (8/2): 83–91.
- Mukhametdinova, A. Kh. (2017). "Istoriko-geograficheskaia kharakteristika Bugulminskogo uezda v XVIII-XIX vv. [Historical and geographical characteristics of the Bugulminsky uyezd in the XVIII-XIX centuries]". Sovremennaia Nauka: Aktualnye Problemy Teorii I Praktiki (12): 40–43.
- Nogmanov, A. I., ed. (2019). Tatarskie seleniia Iugo-Vostochnogo Zakamia: ochagi prosveshcheniia i kultury [Tatar Settlements of the South-Eastern Trans-Kama Region: Centers of Education and Culture]. Kazan: Institut Istorii im. Sh. Mardzhani AN RT.
- Pospelov, E. M. (2002). Geograficheskie nazvaniia mira. Toponimicheskii slovar' [Geographic names of the world. Toponymic dictionary]. Moscow: Russkie slovari, Astrel, AST.
- Troinitskiy, N.A. (1904). Pervaia Vseobshchaia perepis naseleniia Rossiiskoi imperii 1897 g. [The first general census of the population of the Russian Empire in 1897]. St. Petersburg: Izdanie Tcentralnogo statisticheskogo komiteta Ministerstva vnutrennikh del, 1899-1905.
- Zigashin, I.I.; Ivanov, D.V.; Tomaeva, I.F. (2015). Ekologicheskii gid po zelenym ugolkam Respubliki Tatarstan [Ecological guide to the nature of the Republic of Tatarstan] (PDF). Kazan: Foliant. Archived from the original (PDF) on January 8, 2021.
