= Bavly =

Town in the Republic of Tatarstan, Russia

Bavly Бавлы
- Town

Other transcription(s)
  - Tatar: Баулы
- Location of Bavly in the bottom right

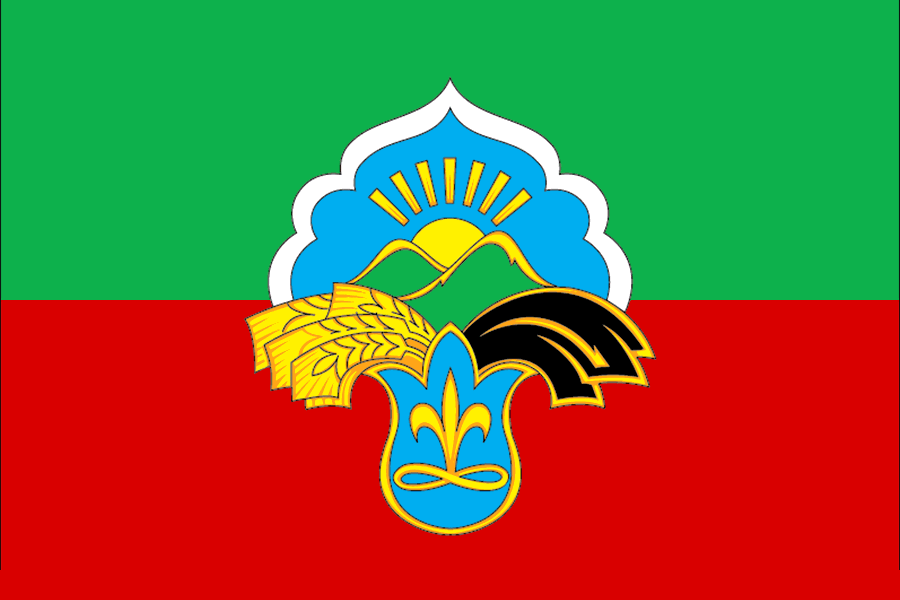
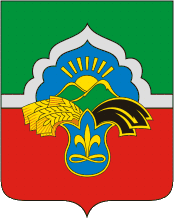
- Flag Coat of arms
- Interactive map of Bavly
- Location of Bavly Bavly (Tatarstan)
- Coordinates: 54°23′N 53°17′E
- Country: Russia
- Federal subject: Tatarstan
- 1755: 1658
- Town status since: 1998
- Elevation: 210 m (690 ft)

Population (2010 Census)
  - Total: 22,109
  - Estimate (2021): 21,628 (−2.2%)

Administrative status
  - Subordinated to: town of republic significance of Bavly
  - Capital of: town of republic significance of Bavly, Bavlinsky District

Municipal status
  - Municipal district: Bavlinsky Municipal District
  - Urban settlement: Bavly Urban Settlement
  - Capital of: Bavlinsky Municipal District, Bavly Urban Settlement
- Time zone: UTC+3 (MSK)
- Postal code: 423930
- OKTMO ID: 92614101001

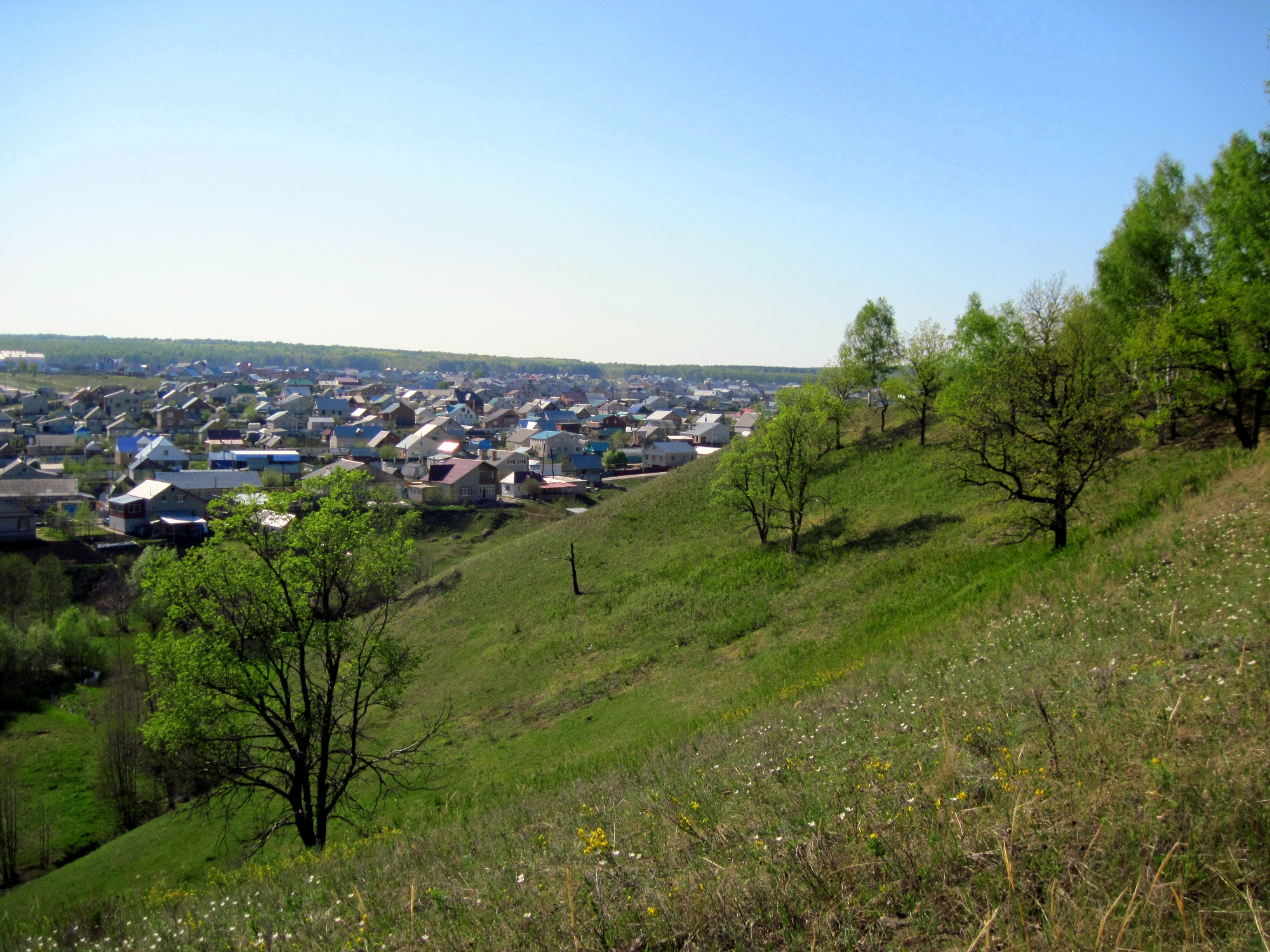
View of Bavly from a hill

Bavly (Russian: Бавлы́; Tatar: Баулы) is a town in the Republic of Tatarstan, Russia, located on the Bavly River (Ik's tributary), 369 kilometers (229 mi) southeast of Kazan. Population: 22,109 (2010 census); 22,939 (2002 census); 20,025 (1989 Soviet census).

== History ==
It was founded in 1755, granted urban-type settlement status in 1950, and that of a town in 1998.

== Administrative and municipal status ==
Within the framework of administrative divisions, Bavly serves as the administrative center of Bavlinsky District, even though it is not a part of it. As an administrative division, it is incorporated separately as the town of republic significance of Bavly—an administrative unit with the status equal to that of the districts. As a municipal division, the town of republic significance of Bavly is incorporated within Bavlinsky Municipal District as Bavly Urban Settlement.

== Sister city ==
- Kütahya, Turkey
