= Yutazinsky District =

Yutazinsky District Ютазинский район (Russian)
- District

Other transcription(s)
  - Tatar: Ютазы районы
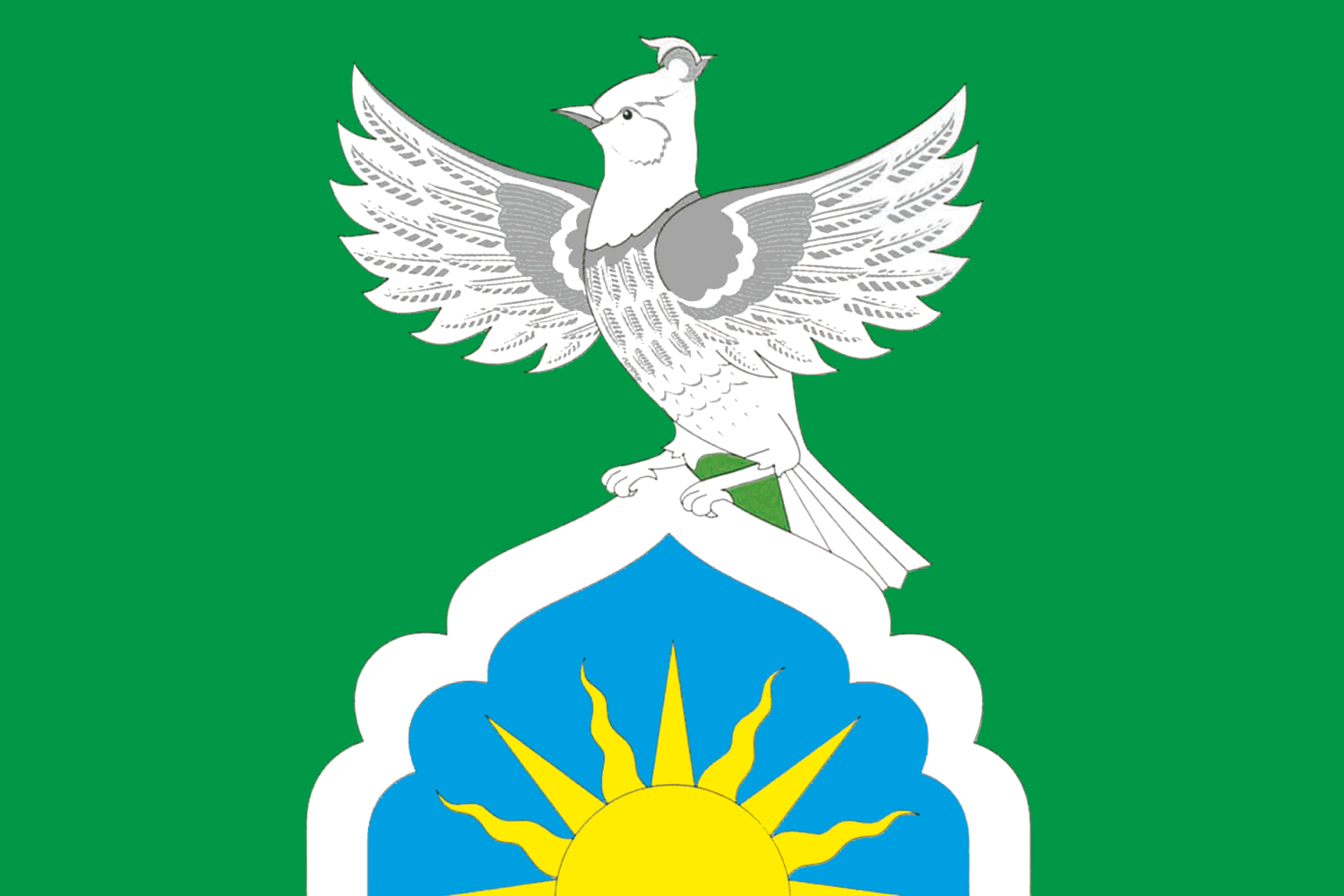
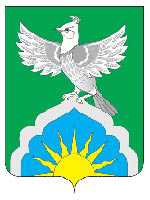
- Flag Coat of arms
- Location of Yutazinsky District in the Republic of Tatarstan
- Coordinates: 54°38′N 53°21′E
- Country: Russia
- Federal subject: Republic of Tatarstan
- Established: April 6, 1991
- Administrative center: Urussu

Area
  - Total: 759 km^{2} (293 sq mi)

Population (2010 Census)
  - Total: 21,615
  - Density: 28.5/km^{2} (73.8/sq mi)
  - Urban: 49.4%
  - Rural: 50.6%

Administrative structure
  - Inhabited localities: 1 urban-type settlements, 37 rural localities

Municipal structure
  - Municipally incorporated as: Yutazinsky Municipal District
  - Municipal divisions: 1 urban settlements, 10 rural settlements
- Time zone: UTC+3 (MSK)
- OKTMO ID: 92654000
- Website: http://jutaza.tatarstan.ru/

Yutazinsky District (Russian: Ютазинский райо́н; Tatar: Ютазы районы) is a territorial administrative unit and municipal district of the Republic of Tatarstan within the Russian Federation. The administrative center is the urban-type settlement of Urussu. As of 2020, 20 248 people reside in the district. Of these, 10 633 live in urban settings while 9615 people live in rural areas. The district was formed in 1935. In 1958 it was renamed into Urusky and in five years it was abolished. In 1991 the district was again formed as an independent administrative unit.

Several enterprises constitute the basis of the district economy. One of them is the industrial park "Urussky", as well as the machine-building plant "Tapart", created by decree of the President of the Republic of Tatarstan Rustam Minnikhanov.

On the territory of the Yutazinsky district there is a natural monument "Urdaly-Tau".

== Geography ==
The district is located in the south-east of the republic. It borders the Aznakayevsky, Bugulminsky, Bavlinsky of the Republic of Tatarstan and Bashkortostan (Tuymazinsky and Sharansky, Oktyabrsky). The largest rivers flowing through the territory of the region are Ik (tributary of the Kama), Yutaza, Dymka (tributary of the Ika).

== Coat of arms and flag ==
The main figure of the coat of arms is lark which is a symbol of dawn, awakening, beauty and represents the southeastern location of the district. The golden sun represents life, energy and warmth. A patterned dome resembles traditional Tatar ornaments. Colors also have their own meaning – gold (yellow) is a symbol of wealth, intelligence, respect, constancy; silver symbolizes perfection, nobility, mutual understanding; green stands for hope, nature, health, growth in life, azure represents truth, honor and virtue.

The region's flag is designed based on the coat of arms. On a green background in the center are a gray-white lark on a blue dome, framed by a white stripe with a yellow sun inside.

== History ==
=== Becoming ===
Until 1920, the territory of the district was located in the Bugulminsky District of the Samara province. In 1920, the county was transformed into a canton of the same name as part of the newly formed TASSR. In 1930 all cantons were restructured as districts. Thus, the territory of the contemporary Yutazinsky district was transferred to Bavlinsky District. The Yutazinsky District was formed as an independent municipal-administrative in 1935.

=== Modernity ===
In 2005, Almas Sakhapov was appointed head of the Yutazin district administration. From 2010 to 2011 the district was headed by Marsel Shaydullin. In 2012 Rustem Nuriyev became the new head of the Yutazinsky district. In September 2020, Ayaz Shafigullin was elected to the post of head of the district.

== Population ==
52.34% of the district's population live in urban conditions (urban-type settlement Urussu).

== Municipal-territorial structure ==
In the Yutazinsky municipal district, there is 1 urban and 10 rural settlements and 38 settlements within it.

== Economy ==
=== Industry ===
One of the largest industrial enterprises in the region is the "Apsaliamovskii kombinat stroitel'nykh konstruktsii i materialov" with an area of more than 33 hectares and a production capacity of 70 thousand m³ of reinforced concrete products per year. Other leading regional enterprises are the Urussinsky chemical plant (production of chemical reagents), "Electroconnector" (production of electrical connectors), "Urusinsky enterprise of nonmetallic materials", "Beton +", "Transport”,“ Volma-Absalyamovo ”(production of gypsum plasterboards and tongue-and-groove plates),“ Yutazinsky elevator”. One of the main enterprises of the region - "Urussis Electromechanical Plant" - went bankrupt in March 2020.

In 2014, an industrial site "Urussu" was opened on the territory of the district. In October 2017, industrial site "Urussu" was upgraded to the status of an industrial park that had some economic benefits for its residents. For example, subsidizing the cost of purchasing or renting space in the park and purchasing equipment is 25% and 50% of the total, respectively. By 2019, 11 residents worked at the site, manufacturing expanded clay blocks, cabinet furniture, plastic products, lumber, chemical products, selling pork and beef meat.

In 2017, on behalf of the President of the Republic of Tatarstan Rustam Minnikhanov, Tatneft and Paker companies founded the experimental machine-building plant "Tapart" to employ former employees of the closed Urussinskaya GRES. In September 2020, the first phase of construction of the facility ended.

From January to September 2020, regional companies shipped goods of their own production for almost 2.9 billion rubles (for the entire 2013 amount was 3.27 billion).

=== Agriculture ===
Agricultural lands occupy more than 52 thousand hectares, of which arable land occupies almost 39 hectares. The main cultivated grain crops are spring wheat, winter rye, barley, oats, buckwheat, peas. The main branches of animal husbandry are meat and dairy cattle breeding and pig breeding. The livestock density is 26 heads per 100 hectares. Large enterprises that are engaged in agriculture in the region are «AgroMir», «Predpriiatie imeni Tukaia», «Nur-Agro», «Tan».

In the first half of 2020, gross agricultural production amounted to 329 million rubles. In 2013 this amount was equal to 810 million.

=== Investment potential ===
As of February 2020, the gross regional product amounted to 8.7 billion rubles.

In the period from 2010 to 2020, the ratio of the average monthly wage to the minimum consumer budget increased from 1.76 to 2.22 times. At the same time, in 2010, the average salary was about 12.7 thousand rubles, and by 2020 it had increased to 33 thousand. The unemployment rate from 2010 to 2020 increased from 1.34% to 2.5%, with a regional average of 3.78.

As of the first half of 2020, investments in fixed assets of the Yutazinsky district (a full range of economic entities) amounted to almost 700 million rubles, or 0.3% of the total investment in Tatarstan. Most of all are invested in the provision of electricity, gas or steam (almost 42 million rubles), manufacturing (more than 23 million), transportation and storage (12.6 million). According to the Federal State Statistics Service of the Republic, in 2019 almost 529 million rubles of investments were attracted to the Yutazinsky district (except for budget funds and income from small businesses), and in 2018 it amounted to 219 million rubles.

=== Housing fund ===
Commissioning of residential buildings
	2018				2019				2020 (January-June)			
	sq.m	%	in Tatarstan		sq.m	%	in Tatarstan		sq.m	%	in Tatarstan	
	sq.m	%	sq.m	% of the district	sq.m	%	sq.m	% of the district	sq.m	%	sq.m	% of the district
Total	10041	100	2409949	0,42	11038	100	2675529	0,41	8448	100	1353428	0,62
Including enterprises	2324	23,15	1301195	0,18	-	-	1569808	-	-	-	551485	-
Including population	7717	76,85	1108754	0,70	11038	100	1105721	1,00	8448	100	801943	1,05

=== Transport ===
The main roads of the region: 16K-0025 Aznakayevo - Yutaza - M5, 16K-1710 Urussu - Oktyabrsky, Urussu - Yutaza - Bugulma. The total length of the road network is 400 km, of which 195.6 km are of regional importance and 204.4 km of local importance. In the region of 185.38 km of paved roads. The railway line "Inza - Chishmy" of the Kuibyshevskaya railway runs through the territory of the region, and the railway line "Urussu - Naryshevo" (the city of Oktyabrsky) is also located.

== Ecology ==
In 1972 a zakaznik "Urdaly-Tau" ("Nornaya Gora") was founded in the district.

In 2020, on the territory of the Dym-Tamak settlement, illegal placement and burial of oil-containing products was discovered on an area of 356 m2.

== Social area ==
On the territory of the district there are 21 kindergartens, 17 schools, the Center for Children's Creativity, the district House of Culture with 21 branches in various villages of the district and the Central Library System with 19 branches. District health care is represented by the Urusinskiy central district hospital, two medical outpatient clinics and 17 feldsher-obstetric points.
