= Privolzhsky City District =

Privolzhsky District Приволжский район
- District

Other transcription(s)
  - Tatar: Идел буе районы
- Coordinates: 55°43′0.1″N 49°12′0.0″E
- Country: Russia
- Federal subject: Tatarstan
- Established: 7 December 1956

Area
  - Total: 115.57 km^{2} (44.62 sq mi)

Privolzhsky City District (Russian: Приволжский район; Tatar: Идел буе районы, Tatar pronunciation: [iˈdɘl buˈjə rɑjuˈnə]) is a city district of Kazan, the capital of the Republic of Tatarstan, Russia. It occupies the southern part of Kazan. Its area is 115.17 square kilometers (44.47 sq mi). Population: 227,755 (2010 Census); 222,602 (2002 Census); 213,598 (1989 Soviet census).

It has a common administration with Vakhitovsky City District.

The district has borders with Laishevsky District to the south, Pestrechinsky District to the south-east, Sovetsky City District to the north-east, Vakhitovsky City District to the north-west and Verkhneuslonsky District to the west (through Volga).

== History ==
In 1918 Zheleznodorozhny and Pletenyovski districts were created as party-territorial units.

In 1919, the first of them was renamed Zabulachny; in 1920 both district were merged into Zabulachno-Pletenyovski District (Russian: Забулачно-Плетенёвский район; Tatar: Болак аръягы-Пеләтән райуны).

In 1926 the district's name was changed to Nizhne-Gorodskoy, and in 1931 to Stalinsky. In 1942, northern part of the district was ceded to the newly formed Dzerzhinsky District. 12 years later, major part of Sverdlovsky District was annexed to the district; later that same year, it was renamed Privolzhsky District.

== District leadership ==
First secretaries of District Party Committee:

- Anna Blusevich (1918–1919)
- Romashev (1919)
- Arnolds Strautmanis (1919–1921)
- Vasily Kalchenko (1921–1923)
- Pyotr Knyazev (1923–1924)
- Andrey Terskiy (1924)
- Aleksandr Kleymyonov (1924–1925)
- Mikhail Prusakov (1925–1927)
- Qıyam Abramof (1927–1928)
- Möxetdinef (1928–1929)
- Ğömär Älmöxämmätef (1929–1930)
- Bäker Şakirof (1930–1931)
- Nikolay Antsishikin (1931–1932)
- Mostafa Mäñgişef (1932–1933)
- Xäybik Sibğätullin (1933–1935)
- Ğabdulla Yunısof (1935)
- Solomon Ioffe (1935–1936)
- Yaqup İslamof (1937)
- Vasily Fomichyov (1937)
- Cäläl Ğilmetdinef (1937–1938)
- Nikolay Zaytsev (1938–1940)
- Äfzaletdin Ğayazetdinef (1940–1941)
- Dmitry Tyshkevich (1941–1942)
- Anastasiya Garast (1942–1944)
- Porfiriy Ustinov (1944–1951)
- Aleksandra Pyatakova (1951–1955)
- Salix Minüşef (1955–1957)
- Nikolay Malinkin (1957–1961)
- Aleksandr Bondarenko (1961–1962)
- Yünir Cämaletdinef (1962–1966)
- İldus Sadıyqof (1966–1970)
- Ğömär Yosıpof (1970–1973)
- İldus Ğälief (1973–1980)
- Revo Hidiätullin (1980–1983)
- Valery Plastinin (1983–1984)
- Olga Yermakova (1984–1991)
