= Nizhniye Vyazovye =

Nizhniye Vyazovye Нижние Вязовые
- Urban-type settlement

Other transcription(s)
  - Tatar: Карамалы Тау
- Interactive map of Nizhniye Vyazovye
- Location of Nizhniye Vyazovye Nizhniye Vyazovye (Tatarstan)
- Coordinates: 55°49′N 48°32′E
- Country: Russia
- Federal subject: Tatarstan
- Administrative district: Zelenodolsky District
- Founded: no later than the first half of the 17th century
- Urban-type settlement status since: 1957

Population (2010 Census)
  - Total: 8,048
  - Estimate (2021): 7,053 (−12.4%)

Municipal status
  - Municipal district: Zelenodolsky Municipal District
  - Urban settlement: Nizhniye Vyazovye Urban Settlement
  - Capital of: Nizhniye Vyazovye Urban Settlement
- Time zone: UTC+3 (MSK)
- Postal code: 422500
- OKTMO ID: 92628162051

Nizhniye Vyazovye (Russian: Ни́жние Вязовы́е; Tatar: Карамалы Тау) is an urban locality (an urban-type settlement) in Zelenodolsky District of the Republic of Tatarstan, Russia, located on the right bank of the Volga River (Kuybyshev Reservoir), 6 kilometers (3.7 mi) west of Zelenodolsk, the administrative center of the district. As of the 2010 Census, its population was 8,048.

== History ==
It was founded no later than the first half of the 17th century and was granted urban-type settlement status in 1957.

== Administrative and municipal status ==
Within the framework of administrative divisions, the urban-type settlement of Nizhniye Vyazovye is subordinated to Zelenodolsky District. As a municipal division, Nizhniye Vyazovye, together with eleven rural localities, is incorporated within Zelenodolsky Municipal District as Nizhniye Vyazovye Urban Settlement.

== Economy and infrastructure ==
As of 1997, two major industrial enterprises in the settlement were a fur factory and a meat combine. The settlement serves as a railway station on the Moscow–Kazan line.

== Demographics ==
Nizhniye Vyazovye population
- 2010 Census: 8,048
- 2002 Census: 8,275
- 1989 Census: 6,011
- 1979 Census: 7,186

In 1989, the population was ethnically mostly Russian (78.5%), followed by Tatars (14.5%), Chuvash (2.1%), and Ukrainians (1.0%).
