= Derbyshki =

Residential area in Kazan, Republic of Tatarstan, Russia

Coordinates: 55°51′51″N 49°13′43″E

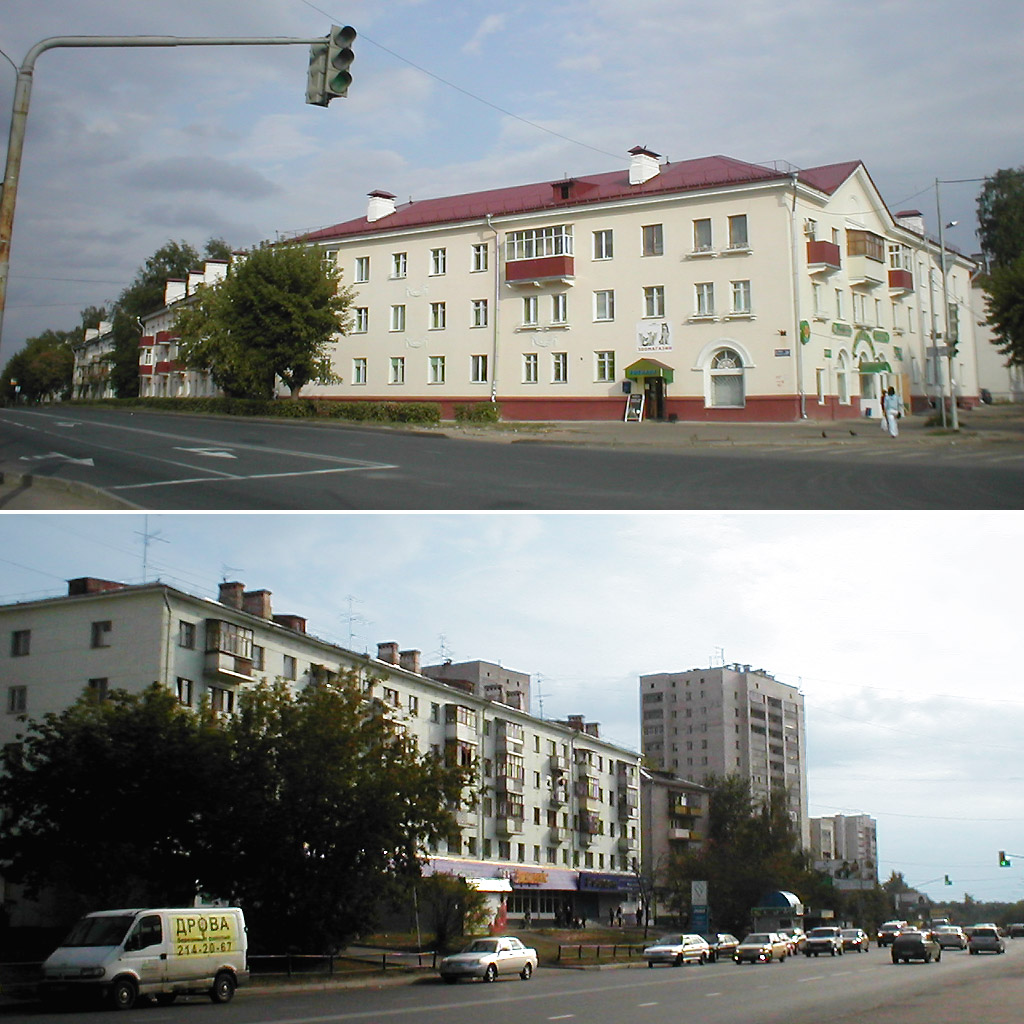
Streets in Derbyshki

Derbyshki (Russian: Дербышки; Tatar: Дәрвишләр бистәсе) is a residential area in the city of Kazan, the capital of the Republic of Tatarstan, Russia. Until November 1998 it was two rural localities (Bolshiye Derbyshki and Malyie Derbyshki), which were merged into Kazan in November 1998 along with a number of other rural localities of Vysokogorsky District.

== History ==
The origin of the name is unknown but it is perhaps that it might be from a man named Dervish. There was an Astrakhan khan of the Kazan Khanate called Darwish Ghali II from 1554 to 1556. In the 16th century Near rivers the Kazanka River and the Kinderka River settled village Derbyshkino (Tatar: Дәрвиш авылы, Дәрбишгали, Дербышки). In 1567, there were three peasant households: Derbyshki Small, Derbyshki Large and third — empty. Derbyshki Small Derbyshki located on Archa Darugha (Tatar: Арча даругасы), where the Noksa River empties into the Kazanka River. Derbyshki Large located at near the Kazanka and Kinderka rivers. On the territory of the empty farm appeared the current settlement Derbyshki. In 1650 its population was 41 people.

With the advent of the railway "Derbyshki" was built. In 1932 it was decided to build a railway car factory, but due to the political situation on 8 February 1940 it was decided to construct the Kazan Optical and Mechanical Plant (KOMZ). During the Second World War residents of besieged Leningrad were evacuated to Derbyshki. Many of them stayed after the war. One of the largest opto-electronic instrument research and production facilities was established in Derbyshki - NPO "State Institute of Applied Optics, founded in 1966 on as a branch of the S.I.Vavilov State Optical Institute.

== Economy ==
In the settlement there are:

- 3 industrial enterprises
- 2 companies regard
- 8 schools
- 13 kindergartens
- 3 health institution
- 4 sports facilities, including the "Raketa" stadium
- there’s also the Lake Komsomolskoye, ski jumping hill, and piste are in wood

== Gallery ==
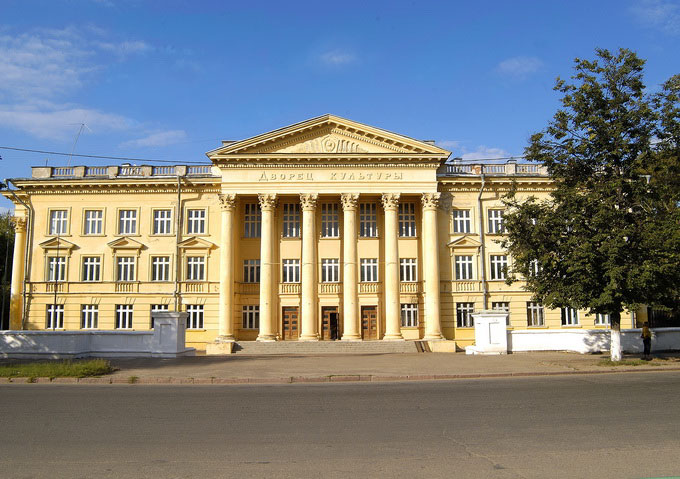
Cultural center by Said-Galiev Sahib-Garey

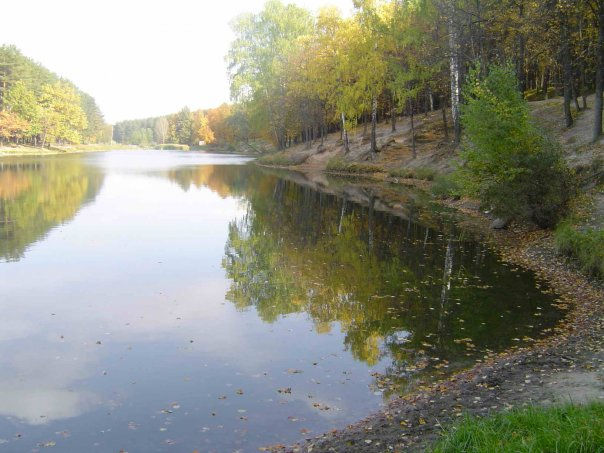
The Lake Komsomolskoe
