= Sovetsky City District, Kazan =

Human settlement in Kazan, Republic of Tatarstan, Russia

Coordinates: 55°49′N 49°15′E

View of Urmanlı Street in Olı Därwişlär, Sovetsky City District, Kazan, Russia.

Sovetsky City District (Russian: Сове́тский район; Tatar: Сове́т районы́) is a city district of Kazan, the capital of the Republic of Tatarstan, Russia. It occupies the northeastern and eastern parts of Kazan, and is the most populous district of the city. Its area is 167 square kilometers (64 sq mi). Population: 275,514 (2010 census); 240,374 (2002 census); 163,676 (1989 Soviet census). The head of the district is Rustem Gafarov.

The district has one of the three largest in the city and the latest among them the time construction (1990s) "sleeping" area Azino (south-eastern part of the area), residential areas along the Siberian tract and Arskii fields Territories microdistricts Tankodrom, Adel Kutuy (in common parlance - Adelka), a large urban-type settlement Derbyshki and several other peripheral settlements, including included in the city of Kazan has recently (in 1998 and 2004) as well as several large industrial enterprises in industrial zones.

The district extends seal of existing and new construction of "sleeping" microdistricts of mass residential development - Kazan - XXI (formerly Takeoff in place of the old airport) Culon-stroy and other. According to the general plan of city development, planned renovation of the residential quarters of industrial zones along the street Guards in south-western part of the district, as well as the newly annexed to the city (in 2004.) Unused areas - development through enterprise, derived from the inner city, industrial area east of Kazankompressormash) and the construction of no less than Azino new "sleeping" area of mass multi-storey buildings Zanoksinskiy-Novoe Azino, Azino-east of the locality Voznesenskoye. Previously, before 1956 the main part of the district was the Molotovskiy district which in 1934 was split from the eastern part of the Bauman district (formed in 1918).

In the district there are:

- 17 industrial enterprises
- 17 building organizations
- 17 enterprises of transport and communication
- 19 research institutes and design bureaus
- 39 schools and 2 schools for young workers
- 7 professional schools
- 5 colleges
- 67 kindergartens
- 33 health care
- more than 130 sports facilities, including a unique stadium "Raketa"

== District leadership ==
First secretaries of District Party Committee:

- Äsğar Biktahirof (1935-1936)
- Ğärif Xisamof (1936-1937)
- Nikita Klochkov (1937)
- Ğömär Ğäipef (1937-1938)
- Ivan Palagin (1938-1940)
- Sergey Prokofyev (1940)
- Bronislava Meksina (1941-1948)
- Zinnur Säğdief (1948)
- Klavdiya Kalmykova (1948-1953)
- Xaci Bulatof (1953-1958)
- Ğömär Safin (1958-1963)
- İldar Taşbulatof (1963-1967)
- Vladimir Zamaryanov (1967-1970)
- Ädip Miñdebayıf (1970-1973)
- Anatoliy Shurtygin (1973-1985)
- Räis Gäräyef (1985-1988)
- Kamil İsxaqof (1988-1989)
- Älbirt Kamalief (1989-1990)
- Älbirt Fäxretdinef (1990-1991)
