= Kirovsky City District, Kazan =

Kirovsky District Кировский район (Russian)
- District

Other transcription(s)
  - Tatar: Киров районы
- Coordinates: 55°49′17″N 48°57′11″E
- Country: Russia
- Federal subject: Tatarstan
- Established: 1934
- Administrative center: Kazan

Area
  - Total: 10,879 km^{2} (4,200 sq mi)

Kirovsky City District (Russian: Кировский район, romanized: Kirovsky rayon; Tatar: Киров районы, IPA: [ˈkirəf rɑjuˈnə]) is a city district of Kazan, the capital of the Republic of Tatarstan, Russia. It occupies the western part of Kazan. Its area is 108.79 square kilometers (42.00 sq mi). Population: 275,514 (2010 census); 240,374 (2002 census); 139,598 (1989 Soviet census).

It has a common administration with Moskovsky City District.

The district has borders with Zelenodolsky District to the west, Moskovsky City District to the north and east, Vakhitovsky City District to the south-east (mostly through Kazanka and Volga rivers) and Verkhneuslonsky District to the south (through Volga).

== History ==
South-eastern part of the district has been part of Kazan from as early as XIX century. By 1910s, the neighbourhoods (slobodas) of Admiralteyskaya Sloboda, Yagodnaya Sloboda, Bolshoye Igumnovo, Maloye Igumnovo, Grivka and Dalneye Ustye were part of the 6th police district of Kazan.

Obyedinyonno-Slobodskoy District (Russian: Объединённо-Слободской район, Tatar: Берләшкән Бистә райуны) was created as a party-territorial unit on April 19, 1919. In 1925 was renamed Zarechensky District (Russian: Зареченский район, Tatar: Елга аръягы райуны) and became an administrative district. By that time, there were 14 settlements under the district's jurisdiction: 6 aforementioned neighbourhoods, Kozya Sloboda, Kizichskaya Sloboda, Krylovka, Novaya Stroyka, Savinovskaya Stroyka, Porokhovaya Sloboda, Udelnaya Stroyka, Ivanovaskaya Stroyka; last three of them were merged into Vosstaniya Sloboda. Nearly all of them were located on the northern bank of Kazanka River, in the city part called Zarechye, hence the name of the district.

It was again renamed in 1931, this time to Proletarsky District (Russian: Пролетарский район, Tatar: Пыралитарият райуны).

In 1934, eastern part of Zarechye was ceded to newly formed Leninsky District.

The district was given its present-day name in 1935.

In mid-1950s, part of the district fell into the flooding zone of the Kuybyshev Reservoir: the entire neighbourhood of Dalneye Ustye, small parts of Admiralteyskaya Sloboda, Yagodnaya Sloboda, Bolshoye Igumnovo and Maloye Igumnovo were flooded; several enterprises were relocated from flooding zone, most notable of them being Kazan river port, which was relocated to Yaña Bistä area.

== District leadership ==
First secretaries of District Party Committee:

- Edmund Żebrowski (1918) (Note: first secretary of Admiralteysky District Party Committee)
- Mikhalyov (1919) (Note: first secretary of Admiralteysky District Party Committee)
- Möxämmätcan Möxämmätşin (1919–1920)
- Aleksande Ochkov (1920)
- Afanasy Zharkov (1920)
- Vasliy Lazarev (1920–1921)
- Arseny Vanyushin (1921–1922)
- Ivan Ponedelko (1922–1924)
- Ğäliulla Qasıymof (1924)
- Miñgäräy Säğidullin (1924)
- Ivan Ponedelko (1925–1926)
- Filipp Fyodorov (1926–1927)
- Mikhail Prusakov (1927–1928)
- Yakov Rozenberg (1928)
- Pavel Aksyonov (1928–1930)
- Solomon Ioffe (1930–1931)
- Sergey Korovin (1931–1932)
- Stepan Anikin (1933–1934)
- Vasily Fomichyov (1935–1937)
- Mikhail Kuzmin (1937)
- Ğäli Däwlätqazin (1937–1938)
- Grigory Tikhonov (1938–1940)
- Pavel Delvin (1941–1942)
- Samuil Tarakanov (1942–1946)
- Vasliy Ilyin (1946–1951)
- Nikolay Kozlov (1951–1955)
- Aleksandr Serebrennikov (1955–1959)
- Vladislav Muravyov (1959–1960)
- Mariya Shikhova (1960)
- Sergey Bogatyryov (1961–1966)
- Igor Naumov (1966–1971)
- Mars Rämief (1971–1978)
- İduard Qançurin (1978–1985)
- Gennady Zertsalov (1985–1987)
- Rawil Sabitof (1987–1991)
