= Urussu =

Urussu Уруссу
- Urban-type settlement

Other transcription(s)
  - Tatar: Урыссу
- Interactive map of Urussu
- Location of Urussu Urussu (Tatarstan)
- Coordinates: 54°36′N 53°27′E
- Country: Russia
- Federal subject: Tatarstan
- Administrative district: Yutazinsky District
- Founded: 1945–1946
- Urban-type settlement status since: 1947

Population (2010 Census)
  - Total: 10,681
  - Estimate (2021): 10,520 (−1.5%)

Administrative status
  - Capital of: Yutazinsky District

Municipal status
  - Municipal district: Yutazinsky Municipal District
  - Urban settlement: Urussu Urban Settlement
  - Capital of: Yutazinsky Municipal District, Urussu Urban Settlement
- Time zone: UTC+3 (MSK)
- Postal codes: 423950, 423951
- OKTMO ID: 92654151051
- Website: jutaza.tatarstan.ru/poselenia/urussinskoe.htm

Urussu (Russian: Уруссу́; Tatar: Урыссу) is an urban locality (an urban-type settlement) and the administrative center of Yutazinsky District in the Republic of Tatarstan, Russia, located on the left bank of the Ik River at the border with the Republic of Bashkortostan, 382 kilometers (237 mi) from the republic's capital of Kazan. As of the 2010 Census, its population was 10,681.

== History ==
It was established in 1945–1946 and was granted urban-type settlement status in 1947. It served as a district administrative center in 1958–1963 and then again since 1991.

== Administrative and municipal status ==
Within the framework of administrative divisions, the urban-type settlement of Urussu serves as the administrative center of Yutazinsky District, of which it is a part. As a municipal division, Urussu is incorporated within Yutazinsky Municipal District as Urussu Urban Settlement.

== Economy ==
As of 1997, local industrial facilities included a thermal power station and various construction, chemical, and electrical plants.

Urussu is a railway station on the Ulyanovsk–Ufa line.

== Demographics ==
Urussu population
- 2010 Census: 10,681
- 2002 Census: 11,258
- 1989 Census: 10,663
- 1979 Census: 10,738

As of 1989, the population was mostly Tatar (52.6%), Russian (39.4%), Bashkir (1.8%), and Ukrainian (1.6%).
