= Cheremshansky District =

Cheremshansky District Черемшанский район (Russian)
- District

Other transcription(s)
  - Tatar: Чирмешән районы
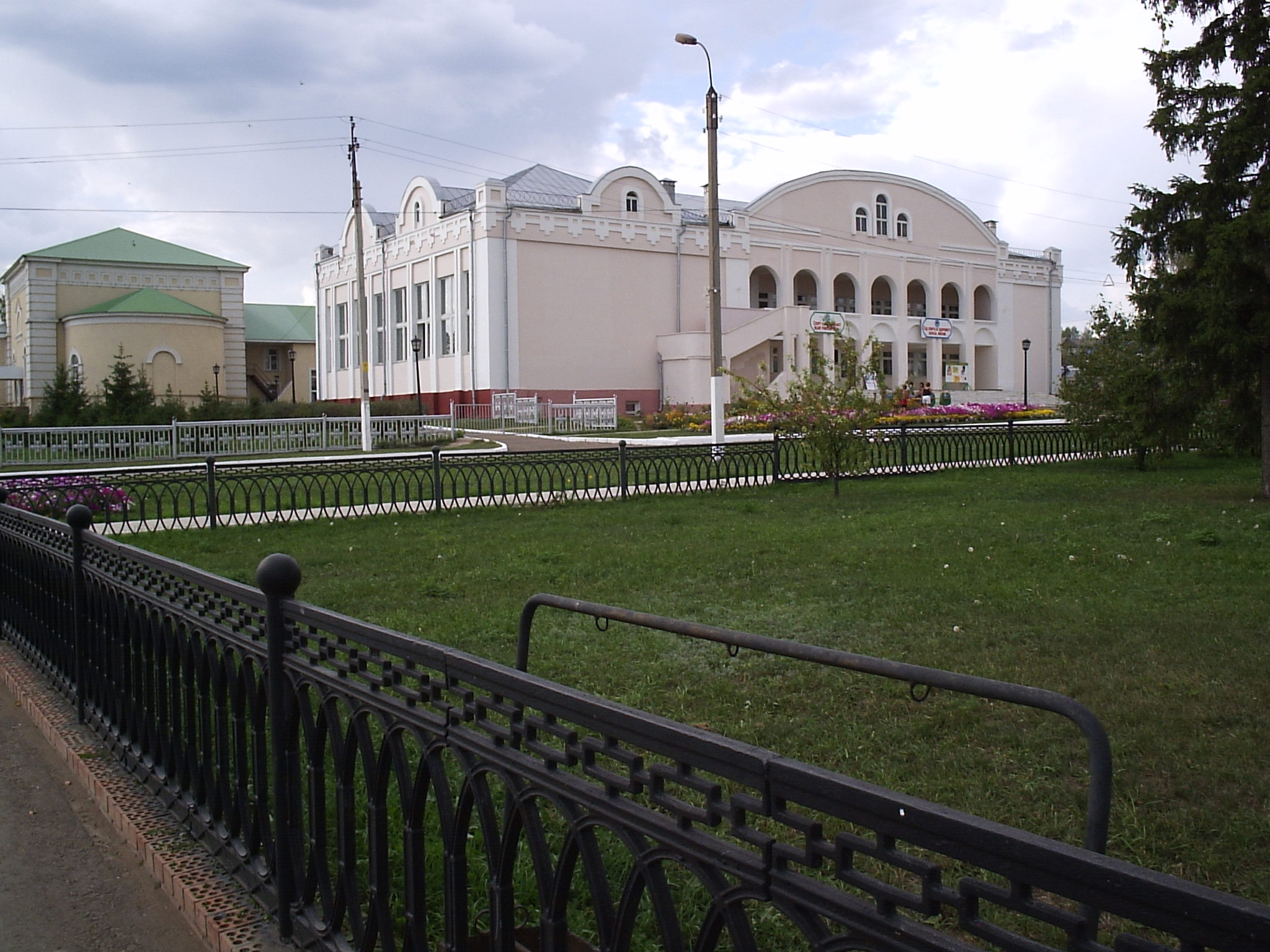
- House of Culture in the selo of Cheremshan

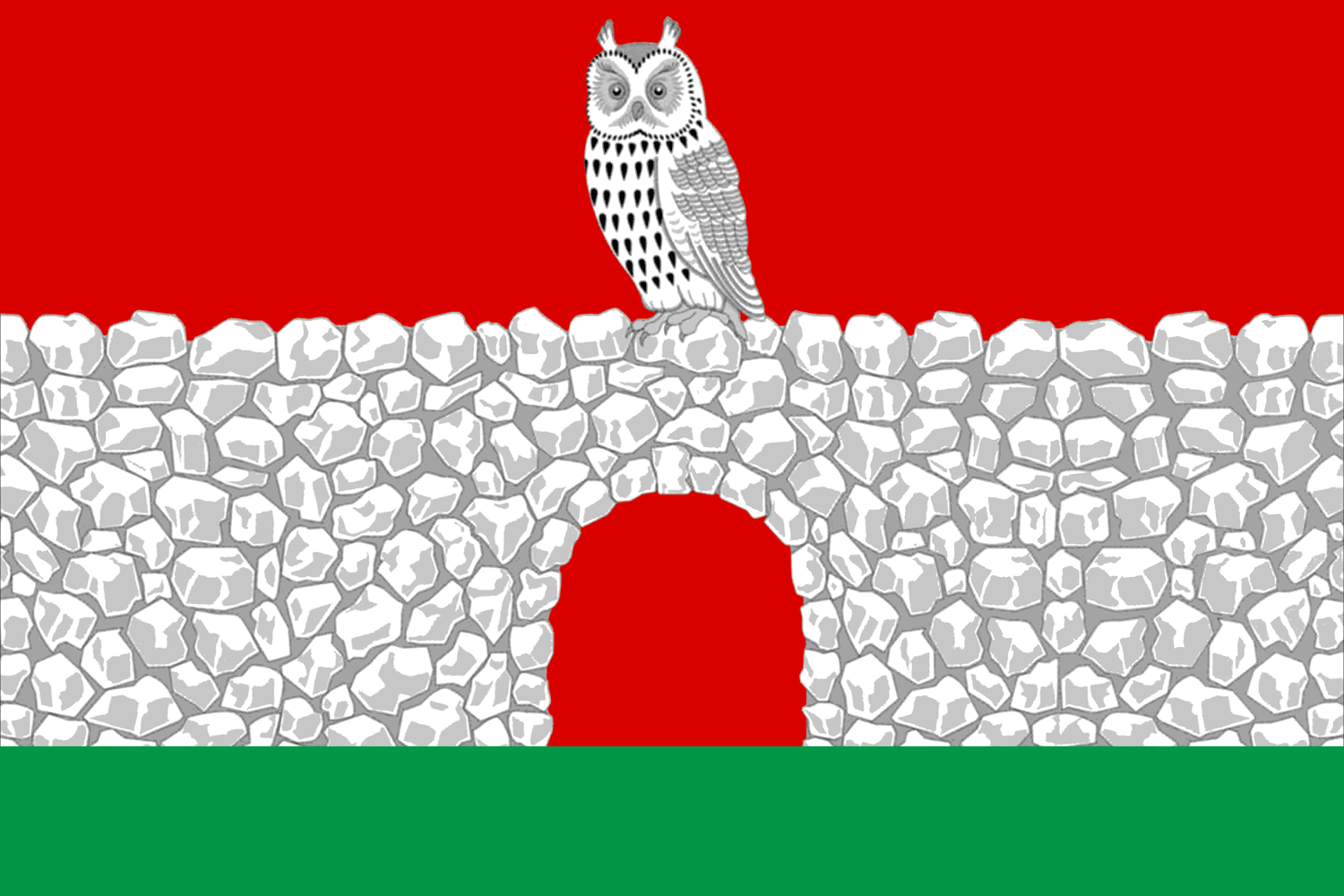
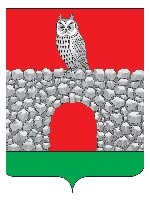
- Flag Coat of arms
- Location of Cheremshansky District in the Republic of Tatarstan
- Coordinates: 54°45′N 51°28′E
- Country: Russia
- Federal subject: Republic of Tatarstan
- Established: 1930
- Administrative center: Cheremshan

Area
  - Total: 1,364 km^{2} (527 sq mi)

Population (2010 Census)
  - Total: 20,361
  - Density: 14.93/km^{2} (38.66/sq mi)
  - Urban: 0%
  - Rural: 100%

Administrative structure
  - Inhabited localities: 48 rural localities

Municipal structure
  - Municipally incorporated as: Cheremshansky Municipal District
  - Municipal divisions: 0 urban settlements, 18 rural settlements
- Time zone: UTC+3 (MSK)
- OKTMO ID: 92658000
- Website: http://cheremshan.tatarstan.ru/

Cheremshansky District (Russian: Черемшанский райо́н; Tatar: Чирмешән районы) is an territorial administrative unit and municipality of the Republic of Tatarstan within the Russian Federation. The district is located in the south of the republic and occupies a total area of 1,363.9 square kilometres (526.6 sq mi). According to the 2010 census, the municipality had a population of 20,361. The administrative center of the district, the “selo” (village) of Cheremshan accounts for 29.1% of the district's total population.

The settlement of Cheremshan arose in the 1730s within a fortress of the same name located on the New Zakamskaya fortification line that was built on the southern border of Muscovy. The district was first established under the name Pervomaisky on 10 August 1930. In 1963, it was abolished and the territories residing in it were transferred to the Oktyabrsky and Almetyevsky districts. In January 1965, the district was reestablished once more and received its contemporary name of Cheremshansky.

== Geography and Climate ==
The Cheremshansky district is located in the south-west of the Republic of Tatarstan and shares borders with the Nurlatsky, Aksubaevsky, Novosheshminsky, Almetyevsky, Leninogorsky districts and with the Samara region (Chelno Vershinsky and Shentalinsky districts). The temperate climate of the region is characterized by warm springs and long and cold winters. Rivers Bolshaya Sulcha, Sheshma and Bolshoy Cheremshan flow in the region. The district has valuable deposits of oil and bitumen.

The region is located in the forest-steppe zone. Forests cover 26% of its land area and most of the remaining land is arable. The local ecology has diverse flora and fauna characteristic of the southeastern Trans-Kama region; there are about 932 plant species and 303 animal species known to inhabit the district. Moles, voles, marmots, red ground squirrels, jerboas, mice and other steppe rodents are especially widespread. After their introduction in 1934, the American mink became very common in the Cheremshansky district. Lynxes, wolves, foxes and weasels live in the local forests. Larks, grey partridges, hazel grouse, magpies, tits and other species can be found among the steppe and forest avifauna. Additionally, nature reserves and wildlife sanctuaries occupy an area of 4 hectares in the district.

== Flag and Coat of Arms ==
In March 2005, the Council of the Cheremshansky municipal district approved its new heraldic insignia. The canvas of the coat of arms is divided into three parts, the colour combination repeats the national colours of the Republic of Tatarstan, depicting a silver-coloured stone wall erected on a green field. Above an arch made in the wall, a silver owl sits on a red background.

The central object of the coat of arms, a stone wall, symbolizes the Cheremshan fortress and points to the historical role of the region in protecting the south-eastern borders of Muscovy. The wall can be interpreted as a symbol of strength and independence, and the arch made in it symbolizes hospitality and tolerance. The owl looking at the viewer personifies wisdom and vigilance while guarding state borders. The green field at the bottom highlights the natural wealth of the region. The flag is based on heraldic elements of the district coat of arms. The flag has a width-to-length ratio of 2:3.

== Etymology ==
The Cheremshansky district derives its name from the village of Cheremshan which in turn received from the Bolshoi Cheremshan River flowing in the southeast of Tatarstan. As the geographer Yevgeny Pospelov states, the hydronym appeared as the Russian adaptation of “Cheremisan” — “the river of Cheremis” (Mari). There are several possible variants of its origin in the Tatar language, among which are “river of resinous forest”, “place of gathering of troops” or on behalf of Chiru Memshen (“leader of the troops”). The earliest use of the hydronym dates back to 992, when the Arab traveler Ahmad ibn Fadlan used the word “Jaramsan” which originated from the Iranian “flowing”.

== History ==
=== 17th-19th Centuries ===
After the conquest of Kazan in 1552 and the expansion of the Muscovite state further to the east, territories in the region were regularly raided by the Nogai and Kalmyks. The southeast of modern Tatarstan bordered on the Nogai Horde and until the 1630s nomadic peoples roved across the steppe. In the second half of the 17th century, Russia began building border fortifications, the so-called “lines” along the left bank of the Kama River. In 1652-1656, the first Zakamskaya fortification line along the Bolshoi Cheremshan river was built. Along the old Zakamskaya line, the first forts and serf settlements appeared inhabited by Cossacks, peasants and exiles. The defensive line was built relatively quickly but was not very durable. During the second half of the century, it was repeatedly besieged. At the beginning of the 18th century, Peter the Great decided to strengthen Russia's southern borders and to rebuild the fortress.

The construction of the New Zakamskaya line began in April 1732 under the reign of Empress Anna Loannovna. For these purposes, the Kazan governor was ordered to allocate three thousand workers from local districts and provide them with a monthly payment of 30 altyns. For service on the Zakamskaya (Cheremshanskaya) line, four land militia regiments were formed and mobilized. However, already in 1736, these plans had been revised and the construction was curtailed. Due to the construction of the Orenburg fortress, the New Zakamskaya line was recognized as strategically obsolete even before its completion. As a result, unfinished fortresses and outposts of the line were only partially populated. In 1736, three cavalry companies of the Sheshminsky regiment totaling 306 people were quartered in the recently rebuilt Cheremshan fortress. Despite the diminishment of its military and strategic status, the fortress could garrison more than three thousand people and 16 guns. Thus, with the formation of the Orenburg province, the Zakamskaya line from the state frontier turned into the southeastern border of the Kazan province.

During the 18th century, the lands around the former Cheremshan fortress were gradually settled. The villages of Lower and Upper Karmalka, Lagerna, Mordovskoye Afonkino, Ishlinka, Amirovo and others arose within the modern Cheremshansky district. Local historian Nikolai Florov points out that since 1744 active military units had been transferred to Orenburg, and retired soldiers began to settle on the territory of the Sheshminskaya and Cheremshanskaya fortresses. By 1768 more than a thousand people lived in Cheremshan. In addition to these soldiers, Russian and Tatar peasants, Bashkirs, Mordvins and Chuvashs also settled near the fortress. The turning point in the history of the Cheremshanskaya fortress was the Pugachev uprising. According to memoirs and other historical records, in January 1774, Pugachev's associate, the yasak Tatar Ait Razmateev, at the head of the peasant army, approached the Cheremshan fortifications and demanded the surrender of the fortress. The commandant notified Major General A.I. Miller and he sent about a thousand grenadiers and Cossacks to confront the rebels. In a battle near the village of Saleykino, Razmateev’s army was defeated and their leader was sent to the capital, where he soon died under torture.

Over subsequent decades the population of the fortress and surrounding territories gradually increased. According to the population census, in 1780, 635 men lived in Cheremshan, and by 1844 this number had increased to 900. The mid-19th century witnessed heavy tax increases for local peasants. For additional earnings, many were hired as farm laborers on local farms or left the villages in search of a better life. In 1890, a large fire broke out in the Cherenshan village which resulted in about 600 houses burning down. At the beginning of the 20th century, a volost government was established in Cheremshan, followed by a post station, a telegraph, a church, several rural schools, a hospital and other important volost facilities. In 1910, the population of the village amounted to 4,151 people.

=== 20th Century ===
The years of the October Revolution and the Civil War were difficult for the southeast of the Trans-Kama region. In 1918-1919, battles between the Bolsheviks and Kolchak's army took place in the Bugulminsky county (uyezd), and in 1921 famine broke out in the Volga region, from which a total of about 2 million people suffered.

The administrative affiliation of Cheremshan and adjacent lands changed frequently. Until 1920, the village near the fortress was the center of the Upper Karmal volost of the Bugulminsky district of the Samara province, and from 1920 to 1930 it remained part of the Bugulminsky canton of the Tatar ASSR. The district was first formed under the name Pervomaisky on 10 August 1930. On 26 March 1959, part of the territory of the abolished Aktash district was annexed to the Pervomaisky district, but on 4 January 1963, as a result of consolidation efforts, the district was abolished and became part of the Oktyabrsky and Almetyevsky districts. It was reestablished under the name Cheremshansky on 12 January 1965.

== Administrative and Municipal Status ==
Within the framework of administrative divisions, the Cheremshansky District is one of the forty-three districts in the Republic of Tatarstan. Currently the district executive committee is subordinate to the Council, the head of the district and its residents. Since June 2018, the position of the head of the executive committee has been held by Ilfat N. Shaidullin. The head of the district is Ferdinat M. Davletshin. According to the results of the 2010 census, the ethnic composition of the region was 54% Tatar, 22.8% Chuvash, 17.8% Russian and 4.2% Mordvin with 0.8% representing other nationalities.

== Economy ==
=== Current Situation ===
The geographical position of the Cheremshansky district heavily influences its economic specialization in agriculture and the petroleum industry. Nine oil producing companies operate in the region including Tatneft, Bulgarneft, Okhtin-Oil, Sheshmoil and Tatnefteprom. According to the Ministry of Economy of the Republic of Tatarstan, the oil sector accounts for about 60% of the district economy.

Agriculture plays an important role in the regional economy. Spring and winter wheat, rye, barley, oats, buckwheat, sugar beets, potatoes and other crops are cultivated in the district. The leading sectors of the livestock industry are meat and dairy cattle breeding, pig breeding and sheep breeding. In 2019, the volume of meat production almost doubled compared to the previous year and amounted to 1508 tons. Eighteen agricultural enterprises operate on the territory of the Cheremshansky district in 2020. These included Cheremshanskoe khlebopriemnoe predpriiatie (Cheremshansk bread enterprise), Cheremshanskii maslodelno-syrodelnyi zavod (Cheremshansk butter-cheese-making enterprise) and Cheremshanskii khlebokombinat (Cheremshansk bread-baking enterprise). As of 2016, more than 350 business entities operated in the region.

=== Investment Potential ===
In the 1980s, onions were considered the Cheremshan “brand” and a symbol of the district's agricultural production. The term “onion money” was popular implying that the money raised by family farms from the seasonal sale of onions allowed them to buy scarce goods. Economists jokingly note that with successful investment, ecological production of onions could once again become the region's “brand”. As pointed out by specialists, the local farming sector has a high investment potential as plans for projects including an agro-industrial park are already well underway.

In January–September 2020, Cheremshansky municipal district ranked tenth in the republic in terms of socio-economic development. According to the Committee of the Republic of Tatarstan for Social and Economic Monitoring, fixed capital investment in the region for the full range of economic entities for the first half of 2020 exceeded 993 million rubles, or 0.5% of the total volume of investment in the republic. The largest disbursements of funds were allocated for mining, electricity and gas. According to the Federal Service of State Statistics, the Cheremshansky district attracted more than 1.276 million rubles of investment in 2019, which was almost 200 million more than in the previous year 2018.

=== Transport ===
The village of Cheremshan is 251 km away from Kazan and located 26 km from the nearest railway station Shentala. The 16K-1267 Shentala—Cheremshan—Novosheshminsk—Azeyevo highway passes from the south to the northwest of the district as part of the federal highway Kazan—Orenburg (R-239). Another regional road 16K-0131 Nurlat—Kuzaykino runs from south-west to north-east. From the regional center to the east runs the road 16K-1093 Cheremshan—Leninogorsk, which is extended further to Bugulma. There are further plans that a section of the “Europe—Western China highway (in construction) will pass through the north of the region.

== Social Welfare and Public Life ==
In the 2018/2019 academic year, 25 schools, one primary school-kindergarten, 19 preschool organizations and a vocational school No. 106 with 2391 students and 755 preschoolers operated in the Cheremshansky district. The regional education sector employed more than 700 teachers, instructors and other employees. The average teachers’ salary for 2019 amounted to 28,426 rubles. Medical services are provided by the Cheremshanskaya Central Regional Hospital, which includes ambulance, therapeutic, pediatric, and surgical departments as well as antenatal and psychiatry clinics.

There is a Children's Art School in the district, where creative groups study and perform. These include the ensemble of folk instruments “Fantasy”, the choreographic ensemble “Happy Childhood”, and the vocal ensemble “Spring drops”. In the regional center there is the Yubileiny Ice Palace for 2000 seats and a sports stadium. Library services are provided by the centralized library system which unifies 29 library departments with a total collection of more than 50 thousand books and other printed materials. In the fall 2017 the First Regional Scientific and Practical Historical and Local Lore Conference was held in the regional center of Cheremshan for teachers, ethnographers, cultural workers and librarians.

== Sights ==
In 1980, the Cheremshansk Memorial Center was opened by a local historian Nikolai Frolov. The center conducts research work, organizes exhibitions and publishes books and other materials. In 2007, on the initiative of Frolov, a local history museum was established in Cheremshan with a collection of 2804 items. The history and ethnography of the region, a numismatic collection of Catherine the Great, paintings, natural science objects and other exhibits are presented in eight halls of the museum.

Important tourist attractions in the region include:

- Cheremshan fortress of the 1730s with an open-air exposition. Among the preserved fortifications and earthen ramparts, local residents regularly organize sports competitions.
- The village of Stary Utamysh is one of the oldest settlements in the region. The mosque of 1876-1877 and the Mandi spring have been preserved here.
- Monument to sailor Mikhail Titov, who was shot by Alexander Kolchak's supporters in the Civil War.
- Epiphany Church in the village of Kutema that was built over a hundred years ago.

== Bibliography ==
- Gallyamova, A. G. (2014). Istoriia Tatarstana i tatarskogo naroda, 1917-2013 gg.: Uchebnoe posobie [History of Tatarstan and the Tatar people, 1917-2013: A Textbook]. Kazan: Kazan Federal University.
- Gataullin, R.F. (2018). "Transgranichnye aglomeratcii v sotcialno-ekonomicheskom razvitii [Cross-border agglomerations in socio-economic development]". Urbanistika (3): 114–122.
- Frolov, N.S. (1987). My iz Cheremshana. Selskaia khronika s portretami [We are from Cheremshan. Rural chronicle with portraits]. Kazan: Tatarskoe knizhnoe izdatelstvo.
- Kandalov, V.P. (2013). Svodnye itogi Vserossiiskoi perepisi naseleniia 2010 goda: Statisticheskii sbornik po itogam Vserossiiskoi perepisi naseleniia 2010 goda [Summary Results of the 2010 All-Russian Population Census: Statistical Book] (PDF). Kazan: Izdatelskii tsentr Tatarstanstata.
- Nogmanov, A. I., ed. (2019). Tatarskie seleniia Iugo-Vostochnogo Zakamia: ochagi prosveshcheniia i kultury [Tatar Settlements of the South-Eastern Trans-Kama Region: Centers of Education and Culture]. Kazan: Institut Istorii im. Sh. Mardzhani AN RT.
- Pospelov, E. M. (2002). Geograficheskie nazvaniia mira. Toponimicheskii slovar' [Geographic names of the world. Toponymic dictionary]. Moscow: Russkie slovari, Astrel, AST.
- Zigashin, I.I.; Ivanov, D.V.; Tomaeva, I.F. (2015). Ekologicheskii gid po zelenym ugolkam Respubliki Tatarstan [Ecological guide to the nature of the Republic of Tatarstan] (PDF). Kazan: Foliant. Archived from the original (PDF) on January 8, 2021.
