= Novosheshminsky District =

Novosheshminsky District Новошешминский район (Russian)
- District

Other transcription(s)
  - Tatar: Яңа Чишмә районы
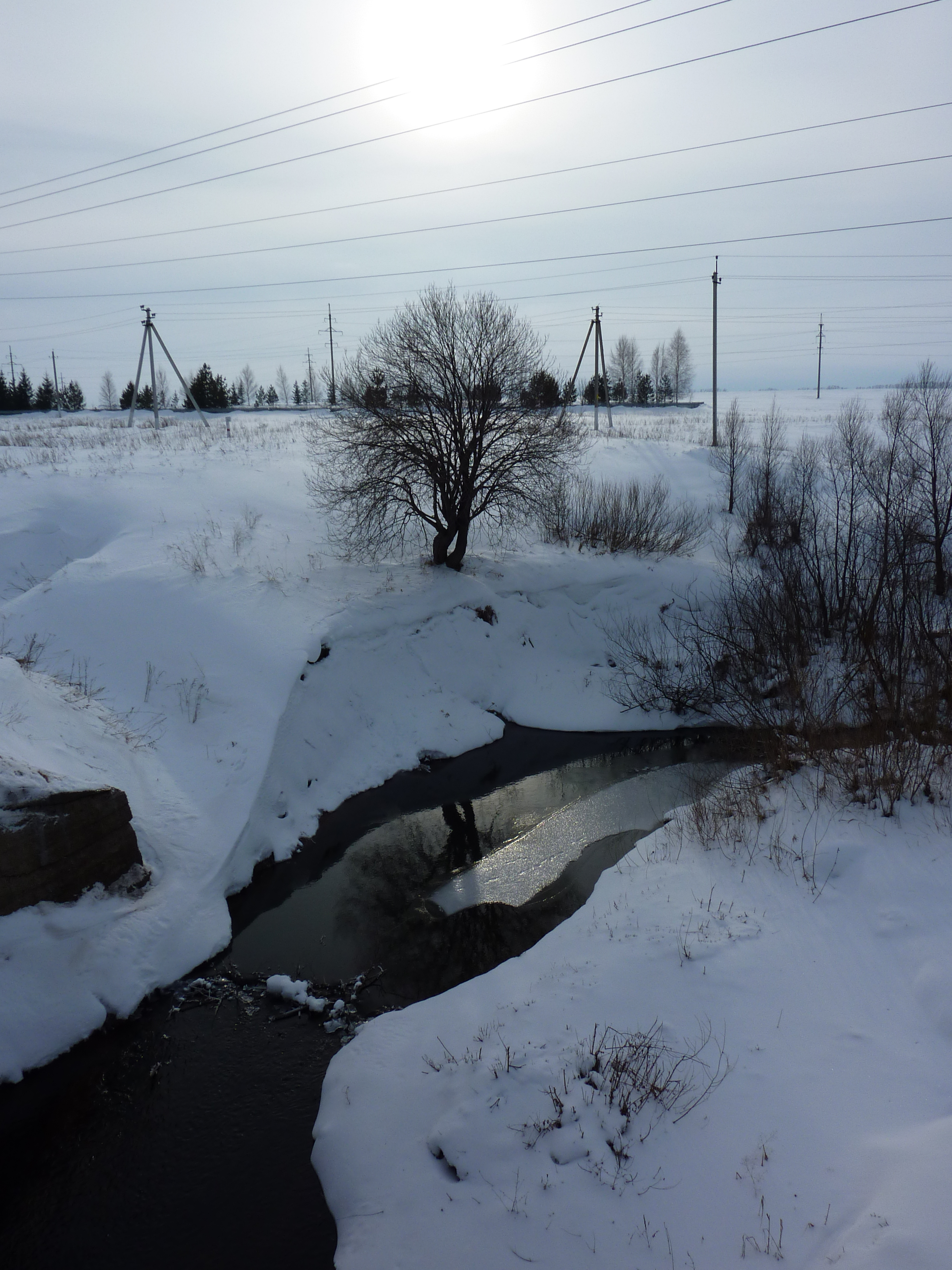
- Studenetz River, Novosheshminsky District

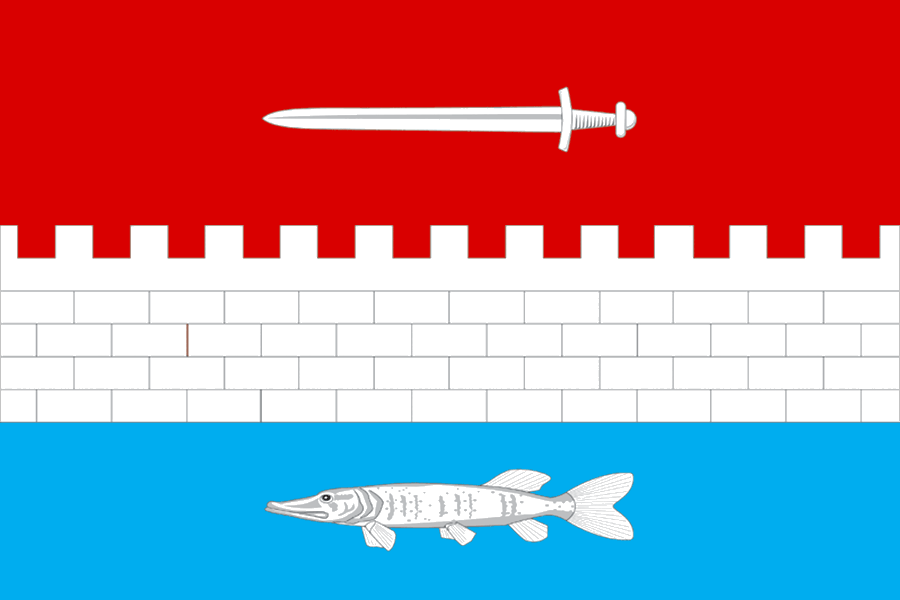
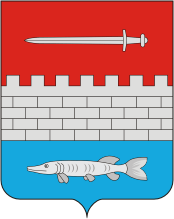
- Flag Coat of arms
- Location of Novosheshminsky District in of the Republic of Tatarstan
- Coordinates: 55°04′N 51°14′E
- Country: Russia
- Federal subject: Republic of Tatarstan
- Established: 10 August 1930
- Administrative center: Novosheshminsk

Area
  - Total: 1,315.3 km^{2} (507.8 sq mi)

Population (2010 Census)
  - Total: 14,179
  - Density: 10.780/km^{2} (27.920/sq mi)
  - Urban: 0%
  - Rural: 100%

Administrative structure
  - Inhabited localities: 30 rural localities

Municipal structure
  - Municipally incorporated as: Novosheshminsky Municipal District
  - Municipal divisions: 0 urban settlements, 15 rural settlements
- Time zone: UTC+3 (MSK)
- OKTMO ID: 92645000
- Website: http://novosheshminsk.tatarstan.ru/

Novosheshminsky District (Russian: Новошешминский райо́н; Tatar: Яңа Чишмә районы) is an territorial administrative unit and municipality of the Republic of Tatarstan within the Russian Federation. The district is located in the center of the republic and covers a total area of 1315 square kilometers (or 507.7 sq miles). According to the 2010 census, the municipality had a population of 14,179. The administrative center, the “selo” (village) of Novosheshminsk, houses 32.2% of the district's total population.

A settlement on the site of modern Novosheshminsk first appeared in historical records in the early 17th century. In 1652-1656, during the construction of the old Zakamskaya fortification line along the Sheshma River, the Novosheshminsky fortress was built. Until 1920, the village was the center of a volost bearing the same name within the Chistopolsky county ([uyezd]) of the Kazan province. From 1920 to 1930 the village was part of the Chistopolsky canton of the Tatar ASSR. The Novosheshminsky district was first established in August 1930. Due to administrative reforms, it was abolished in 1963, and reestablished again in April 1983.

== Geography and Climate ==
Novosheshminsky district is situated in the central part of the Republic of Tatarstan and shares borders with the Cheremshansky, Aksubaevsky, Chistopolsky, Nizhnekamsky and Almetyevsky districts. It has a temperate continental climate with warm summers and frosty winters. The territory lies on a flat area, the topography of the district is elevated in the south and declines progressively to the north. The local landscape is characterized by mixed forests and has many springs and water resources. In the central and southeastern parts of the region are the inflows of the Sheshma River: Kichuy, Sekines, Elkhovka, and Lebedka. There are 145 sites of historical and cultural heritage in the region, including ancient monuments of Volga Bulgaria and parts of the old Zakamskaya fortification line

The issues of ecology and natural conservation are important for the district administration and residents of the district. In 2005, a fuel spill in the Sheshma River was rapidly contained by a response team of the Ministry of Emergencies. After this incident, the situation has been constantly monitored by specialists and the authorities. Additionally environmentalists prevented illegal mining on agricultural land in 2019.

== Flag and Coat of Arms ==
In February 2006, the Council of the Novosheshminsky municipal district approved its new heraldic insignia. The canvas of the coat of arms is divided into three horizontal parts. At the top is a sword depicted on a red background; the middle part includes a grey (or silver) stone wall; at the bottom there is a pike on a blue background. A sword and a fortress wall are the military articles that indicate the historical significance of the Novosheshminsky fortress in the defense of the Russian borderlands. The pike on the canvas symbolizes the richness of the Sheshma’s ichthyofauna and points to the role of fishing for the local population. The flag is based on heraldic elements of the coat of arms. In its visual design, red symbolizes strength, silver allegorizes purity and peace, and blue means courage and industry. The flag has a width-to-length ratio of 2:3.

== Etymology ==
The Novosheshminsky district derived its name from the eponymous Novosheshminsky fortress and the settlement. This eponym, in turn, comes from the Sheshma River (Tatar: Чишмә, romanized: Çişmə), which means “spring” in Tatar. Additionally, the name can be associated with a large number of springs in the region.

== History ==
=== 17th-19th Centuries ===
After the conquest of Kazan in 1552 and the expansion of the Muscovite state further to the east, its newly acquired territories were subject to regular raids by the Nogai and Kalmyks. The southeast of modern Tatarstan bordered on the Nogai Horde and until the 1630s nomadic peoples ranged across the steppe. In the second half of the 17th century, Russia began building border fortifications, the so-called “lines” along the left bank of the Kama River. This period is associated with the construction of one of the first seven forts of the old Zakamskaya line, the Novosheshminskaya fortress.

According to historical sources the first settlements on the site of the modern village of Novosheshminsk arose in 1610. In 1652-1656, during the construction of the Zakamskaya fortification line along the Sheshma River, the Novosheshminsky fortress was constructed. Like other large strongholds of the region, the wooden fortress had a rectangular shape and consisted of six towers, two of which—the northern and southern ones—had gates and watchtowers. The towers could reach 17 meters in height, which made it possible to observe the surrounding area. The fortress was surrounded by a moat up to four meters deep. Within the fortress wall there were rifle huts, guard rooms and courtyards. The armament consisted of 12 culverins and the garrison's personal weapons. Initially, the service was carried out by Cossacks and streltsy but in the 1650s, after the siege of Smolensk, several hundred Polish prisoners of war arrived on the Zakamskaya line to serve there. According to the local historian Felix Kasimov, at that time 127 gentry served in Novosheshminsk under the leadership of Lieutenant Stepan Puzikov and the cornet Marlon Sverkun.

During the second half of the 17th century, the fortress was repeatedly besieged, and its wooden walls were destroyed. In the 1730s, many ramparts and outposts were rebuilt as part of the construction of the New Zakamskaya line. However, the state borders soon moved further to the south, and the fortresses along the Bolshoy Cheremshan and Sheshma lost their military and strategic significance. In 1736, the garrisons of the Zakamskaya line were abolished and its military personnel were transferred to the newly built Orenburg fortress. Thus, with the formation of the Orenburg province, the Zakamskaya line from the state frontier turned into the southeastern border of the Kazan province.

After the fortress was abandoned, retired soldiers as well as Russian and Tatar peasants began to settle in the region. According to the materials of the local population census of 1795, the Novosheshminsk population of that time was 698 men. Throughout the 18th century, the local population was engaged in agriculture, cattle breeding, the fur trade and other craft industries. At the turn of the century, there were three schools, the Trinity and Peter and Paul churches, several smithies and water mills, and a grog-shop in the volost. Every Friday a bazaar was held in Novosheshminsk, and a fair came regularly to the district every year. In 1910, Novosheshminsk was listed as a volost center and had about 800 households and more than five thousand inhabitants.

=== 20th Century ===
In 1917, the Soviets seized power in Tatarstan. In 1919, the Bugulma peasants rose in a large anti-Bolshevik uprising that swept through many of the surrounding regions but was soon brutally suppressed. Thousands of rebels armed with pitchforks and axes freed prisoners and recaptured villages from the Bolsheviks. Historical records witness the brutality of the rebellion and its suppression:

The rude, inhuman treatment of the population - especially in this distinguished the Chinese and the Magyar squadron; families of the Red Army were plundered quite often. In Novo-Sheshminsk, four Chinese shot a woman with a baby in her arms. There have been cases of violence against women.

A year later, a severe famine broke out in the Volga region affecting the lives of many residents and killing several millions of people.

During the 20th century, the region’s borders changed several times. Until 1920, Novosheshminsk was the center of the Chistopolsky volost of the district of the same name within the Kazan province. From 1920 to 1930 it was part of the Chistopolsky canton of the Tatar ASSR. The Novosheshminsky district was first established on August 10, 1930. In 1956 and 1958, the territories of the abolished Yamashinsky and Kzyl-Army districts respectively were added to Novosheshminsk. Due to administrative reforms, the Novosheshminsky district was abolished in 1963, yet would be reestablished again in April 1983.

== Administrative and Municipal Status ==
Within the framework of administrative divisions, the Novosheshminsky District is one of the forty-three districts in the republic. Currently, the district executive committee is subordinate to the Council, the head of the district and its residents. Among the main departments of the executive committee are the registry office, the department of construction, architecture and housing and communal services, the department of economics, the department for youth and sports, the district archive and a number of others. Since December 2010, the position of the head of the executive committee has been held by Rinat R. Fasakhov. The current head of the district is Vyacheslav M. Kozlov.

According to the results of the 2010 census, Russians make up 50.9% of the region's population, 43.4% are Tatars, 4.2% are Chuvashs, and 1.6% are representatives of other nationalities. In 2018, the birth rate per thousand people was 11.8% while the mortality rate was 14.6%. In 2019, the birth rate dropped to 10.2%, and the death rate increased to 16.7%, resulting in a rate of natural population decline of 6.5% in 2019.

== Economy ==
=== Current Situation ===
Due to its geographic location, the Novosheshminsky district belongs to the Almetyevsk economic agglomeration, which specializes in oil production and oil field engineering. The leading sectors of the economy are commodities, industrial production and infrastructure construction. In 2018, about 89% of the region's gross territorial product came from mineral extraction. The average volume of oil production is over a million tons per year. The regional market is represented by the companies Tatneft, Sheshmaoil, Troitskneft, Tatnefteprom and a number of other large companies. In January–April 2020, the average salary in the Novosheshminsky district amounted to 49 thousand rubles, while the average salary in Tatarstan slightly exceeded 37 thousand rubles. The unemployment rate in the region is 1.68% and remains below the republic average.

Agriculture is one of the most rapidly growing industries in the Novosheshminsky district. Agricultural lands cover about 100 thousand hectares with wheat, rye, oats, barley, peas and other crops being cultivated. Meat and dairy cattle breeding as well as sheep breeding are especially developed in the region. The largest agricultural enterprises include Agro-Osnova, Agrofirma Kulon, Sloboda, KFH Arkhangelskoye and individual private farms. The gross production of the agricultural sector for the first half of 2020 amounted to 483 million rubles, or 511,000 rubles per each agricultural worker.

=== Investment Potential ===
In January–September 2020, the Novosheshminsky municipal district ranked seventh in the republic in terms of socio-economic development. The gross territorial product in 2019 amounted to more than 19 billion rubles with a growth rate of 11%. According to the Federal State Statistics Service, in 2019 the Novosheshminsky district attracted more than 2.9 billion in investment (in addition to budgetary funds and small businesses), which is almost 300 million less than investment in the previous year. According to the Committee of the Republic of Tatarstan for Social and Economic Monitoring, the region's investment in fixed assets in the first half of 2020 was 1.3 billion rubles, or 0.6% of total investment in the republic. The largest funds were allocated to manufacturing, electricity and gas. Economists point out that agriculture, livestock complexes, beef cattle breeding and tourism are among the most attractive investment areas for the region’s economy.

The industrial infrastructure of the district includes the industrial site No. 2 for polymer processing with an area of 2.72 hectares. The site was constructed from 2014-2016 as part of a special program designed by the Russian Ministry of Economic Development for the growth of the regional economy. The industrial site No. 2 in Novosheshminsk specializes in the processing of granules and the production of bags and other plastic products. The park has three residents, which produced 319 tons of products with a value of 25 million rubles in 2019.

As a part of the republic project “Strategy 2030” aimed at social and political progress of the region, the focus of the district over the next decade will be on increasing the birth rate and life expectancy of residents, as well as on developing its cultural and sports potential. The district administration is drawing special attention to the modernization of equipment in the meat and dairy industries, the production of bread as well as the construction industry and other key areas. Additionally, the region plans to invest in the expansion of the road network and transport infrastructure in the district.

=== Transport ===
Novosheshminsky district is located in the center of Tatarstan and is surrounded by a network of roads and transport routes. These include the regional roads 16K-1267 “Azeevo (R-239)—Novosheshminsk—Cheremshan—Shentala” and the 16K-1255 “Novosheshminsk—Sheremetyevka” leading to Nizhnekamsk. The administrative center of the district is located 197 km south-east of Kazan. The federal highway R-239 “Kazan—Orenburg—border with Kazakhstan” passes through the north of the district, which, along with the “Shali-Bavly” road currently under construction, will become part of the international highway from Western Europe to Western China. The nearest railway station Shentala is located 75 km from Novosheshminsk, and the port of Chistopol is 64 km away.

== Social Welfare and Public Life ==
In the Novosheshminsky district, medical care is provided by Novosheshminsky central district hospital whose departments include an emergency department with an ambulance point and 23 paramedic and obstetric stations. The hospital has a capacity of 60 beds and contains a rehabilitation ward for special children. In total, the hospital employs 239 people.

Novosheshminsk and its district have a gymnasium and a lyceum, 19 general education schools, three primary schools, kindergartens and educational institutions for preschoolers. There is also an art school, vocational school No. 118, a sports and technical club, a teenage club “Azhagan”, a universal sports hall “Olimp” and other educational institutions and sports facilities in the district. The region regularly hosts mass competitions, including the annual race the “Ski Track of Russia”.

Cultural attractions in the district include one regional and 22 rural houses of culture in addition to many libraries. In 2012, a local history museum was established in Novosheshminsk with a collection numbering nearly a thousand exhibits. In the district village of Zirekly there is a museum of folk art and culture, which contains handicrafts of local residents of the 19th-20th centuries and other collections of folk art.

== Sights ==
The Bulgar fortress Tubylgy Tau is located on the left bank of the Sheshma River. Among other attractions of the region are:

- The Temple of the Ascension of the Lord in the village of Erykly
- The Church of the Holy Trinity in Novosheshminsk
- The Church of St. Catherine in Peter and Paul Sloboda
- The mosque in the village of Tatarskoe Alkino
- The nature reserve “Sklony Korzhinskogo”
- The Urganchinsky botanical reserve.

== Bibliography ==
- Gallyamova, A. G. (2014). Istoriia Tatarstana i tatarskogo naroda, 1917-2013 gg.: Uchebnoe posobie [History of Tatarstan and the Tatar people, 1917-2013: A Textbook]. Kazan: Kazan Federal University.
- Nogmanov, A. I., ed. (2019). Tatarskie seleniia Iugo-Vostochnogo Zakamia: ochagi prosveshcheniia i kultury [Tatar Settlements of the South-Eastern Trans-Kama Region: Centers of Education and Culture]. Kazan: Institut Istorii im. Sh. Mardzhani AN RT.
- Khasanov, M., ed. (2008). Tatarskie seleniya Iugo-Vostochnogo Zakamia: ochagi prosveshcheniia i kultury [Tatar Settlements of the South-Eastern Zakamye: centers of education and culture]. Kazan: Institut Tatarskoi Entsiklopedii.
- Zigashin, I.I.; Ivanov, D.V.; Tomaeva, I.F. (2015). Ekologicheskii gid po zelenym ugolkam Respubliki Tatarstan [Ecological guide to the nature of the Republic of Tatarstan] (PDF). Kazan: Foliant.
