= Cheremshan =

Cheremshan (Russian: Черемшан) may refer to:

- Cheremshan River, several rivers in Russia
- Cheremshan (rural locality), several rural localities in the Republic of Tatarstan, Russia
- Cheremshan Dimitrovgrad, a bandy club based in Dimitrovgrad, Russia
