= Almetyevsky District =

Almetyevsky District Альметьевский район (Russian)
- District

Other transcription(s)
  - Tatar: Әлмәт районы
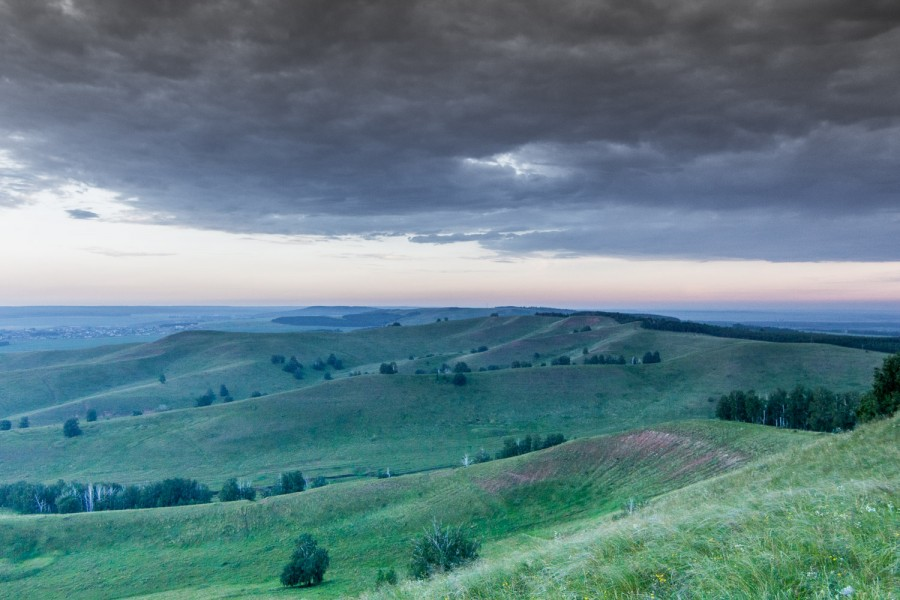
- Almetyevsky Nature Reserve in Almetyevsky District

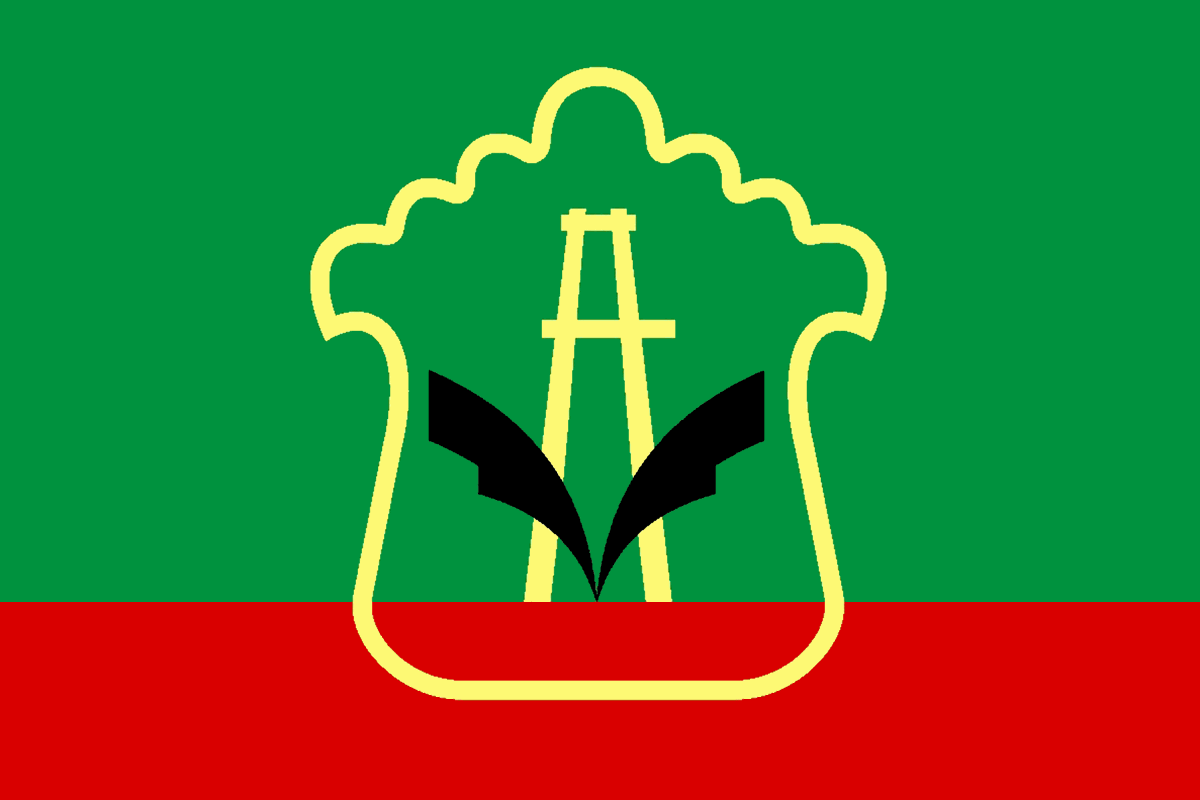
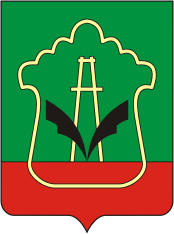
- Flag Coat of arms
- Location of Almetyevsky District in the Republic of Tatarstan
- Coordinates: 54°54′N 52°18′E
- Country: Russia
- Federal subject: Republic of Tatarstan
- Established: August 10, 1930
- Administrative center: Almetyevsk

Area
  - Total: 2,503 km^{2} (966 sq mi)

Population (2010 Census)
  - Total: 51,100
  - Estimate (November 2011): 41,899
  - Density: 20.4/km^{2} (52.9/sq mi)
  - Urban: 19.4%
  - Rural: 80.6%

Administrative structure
  - Inhabited localities: 97 rural localities

Municipal structure
  - Municipally incorporated as: Almetyevsky Municipal District
  - Municipal divisions: 2 urban settlements, 35 rural settlements
- Time zone: UTC+3 (MSK)
- OKTMO ID: 92608000
- Website: http://almetyevsk.tatar.ru

Population of Almetyevsky District
- 2010 Census: 51,100
- 2002 Census: 40,624
- 1989 Census: 33,988
- 1979 Census: 49,722

Almetyevsky District (Russian: Альме́тьевский райо́н; Tatar: Әлмәт районы) is a territorial administrative unit and municipality of the Republic of Tatarstan within the Russian Federation. The district is located in the southeastern central part of the republic and occupies an area of 2,542 square kilometers (about 981 sq mi). According to the 2010 census, the municipality had a population of 197,493 people. The main city Almetyevsk is not included within the administrative structure of the district.

The settlement of Almetyevo first appeared in historical records in the 1730s. From the mid-19th century, Almetyevskaya volost was part of the old Bugulminsky district within the Samara province. The volost changed its status to a district on August 10, 1930.

The Almetyevsky district is one of the largest oil-producing and industrial centers of Tatarstan. The main offices of the oil company Tatneft are located in the district. The city administration plans to create a third special economic zone in the region following the successful examples of Alabuga and Innopolis. The first stage of construction is scheduled for 2024.

== Geography and Climate ==
The Almetyevsky district is located in the south-east of Tatarstan. It shares borders with Sarmanovsky, Zainsky and Nizhnekamsky districts to the north, Novosheshminsky and Cheremshansky districts to the west, Leninogorsky and Bugulminsky districts to the south, and Aznakaevsky district to the east. The district occupies a total land area of 2542.93 km^{2}.

The district is located in the northwest of the Bugulma plateau and the elevation of the district ranges from 200 to 300 meters. The regional rivers Kichuy, Stepnoy Zai and Ursalbash along with their tributaries are among the waterways flowing through the district. The region holds reserves of oil, coal and other mineral resources. The regional climate is temperate continental with cool summers and cold winters.

== Flag and Coat of Arms ==
In December 2006, the Council of the Almetyevsky municipal district approved its new heraldic insignia. The visual design of the coat of arms includes a green and red canvas with a golden staircase and a fountain placed in a tulip flower. The golden staircase allegorically depicts an oil rig, and the black fountain emphasizes the significance of the oil industry to the region's economy. The combination of black and gold symbolizes oil as “black gold”. As noted in the official resolution, the color scheme represents the beauty of the local nature and the importance of industry. The green field embodies the geographic peculiarities of the republic's south-east, while the red stripe symbolizes industrial power. The flag is based on heraldic elements of the coat of arms.

== Etymology ==
The district derives its name from the main city of Almetyevsk. As the geographer Yevgeny Pospelov states, throughout the 18th and 19th centuries, there was the Bashkir village of Almetevo on the site of the modern city. In his opinion, the etymology is based on the possessive of the Bashkir name Almet, which was likely an abbreviation for Al-Muhammad (Tatar: Әлмәт - Әл-Мөхәммәт).

== History ==
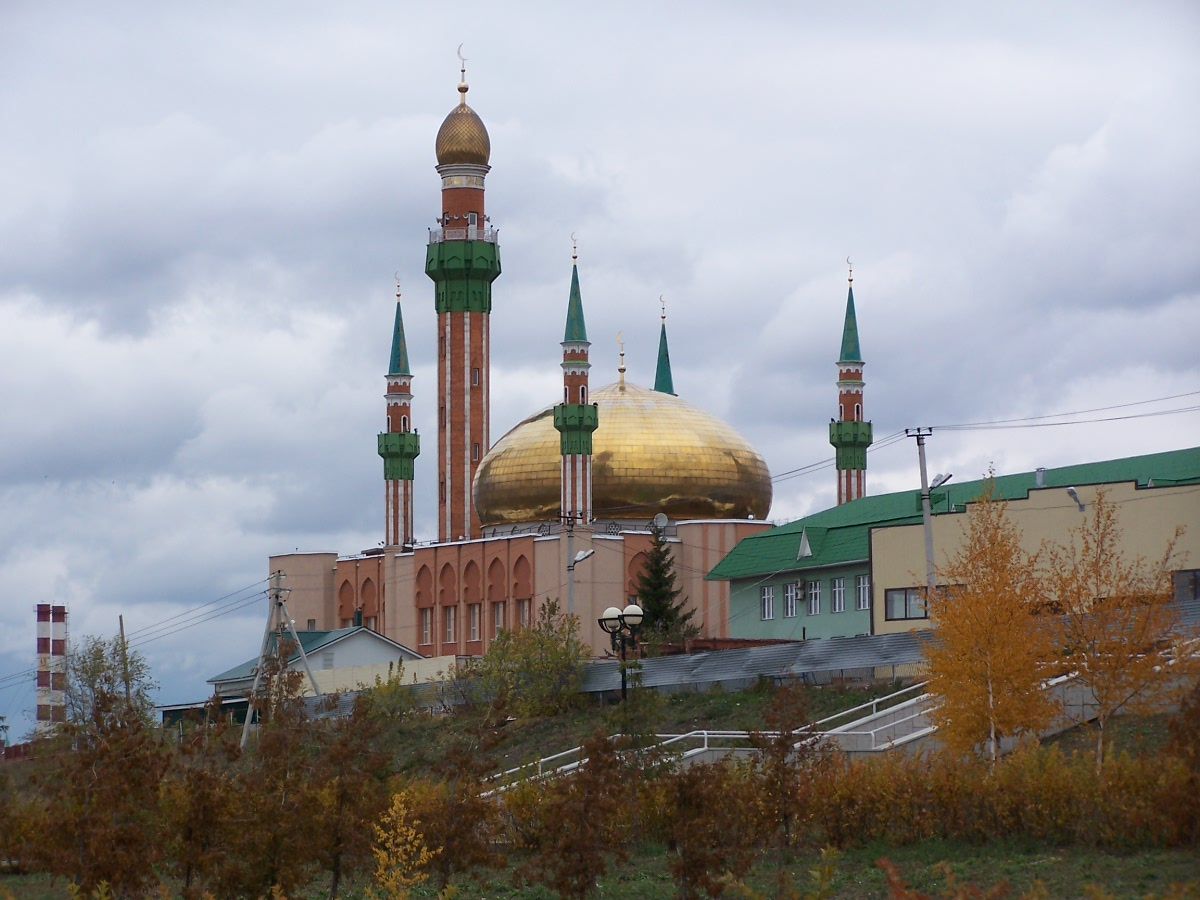
Riza Fakhretdin Muslim Religious Center

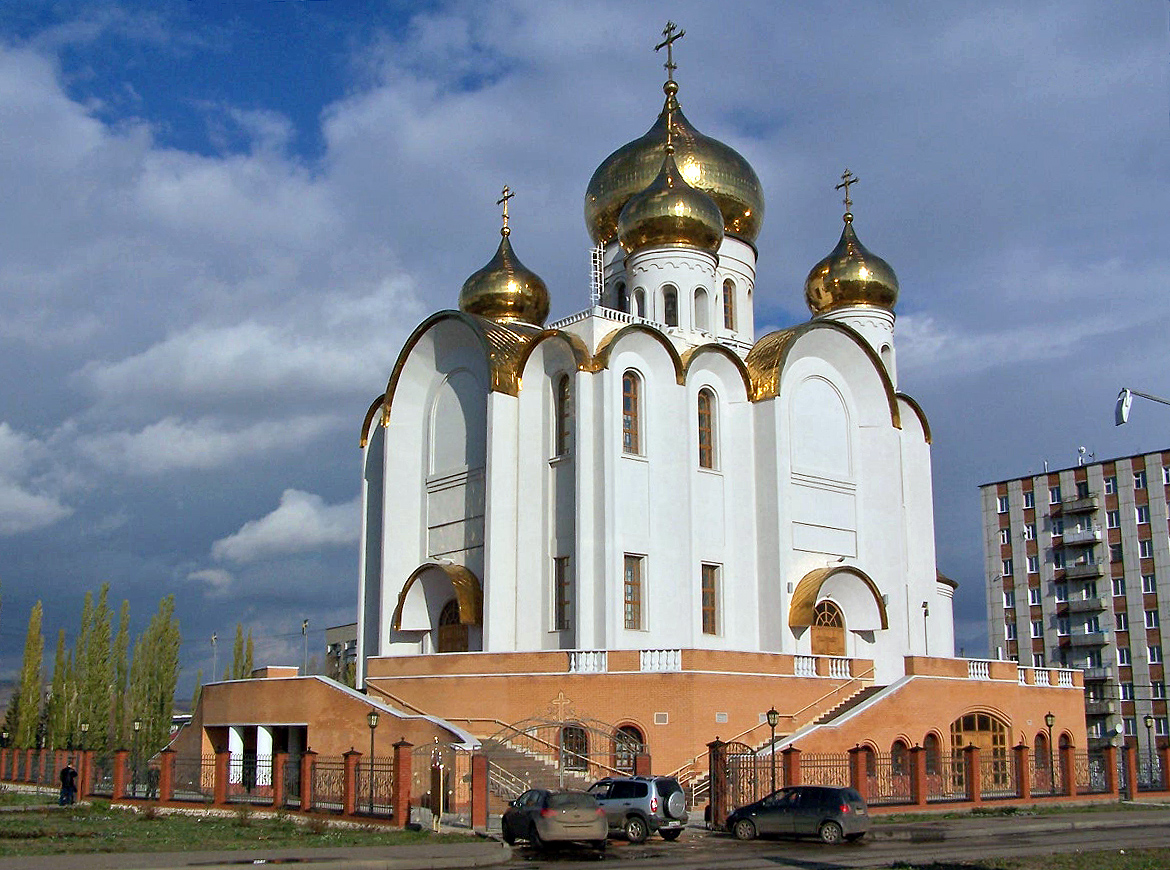
Cathedral in Almetyevsk

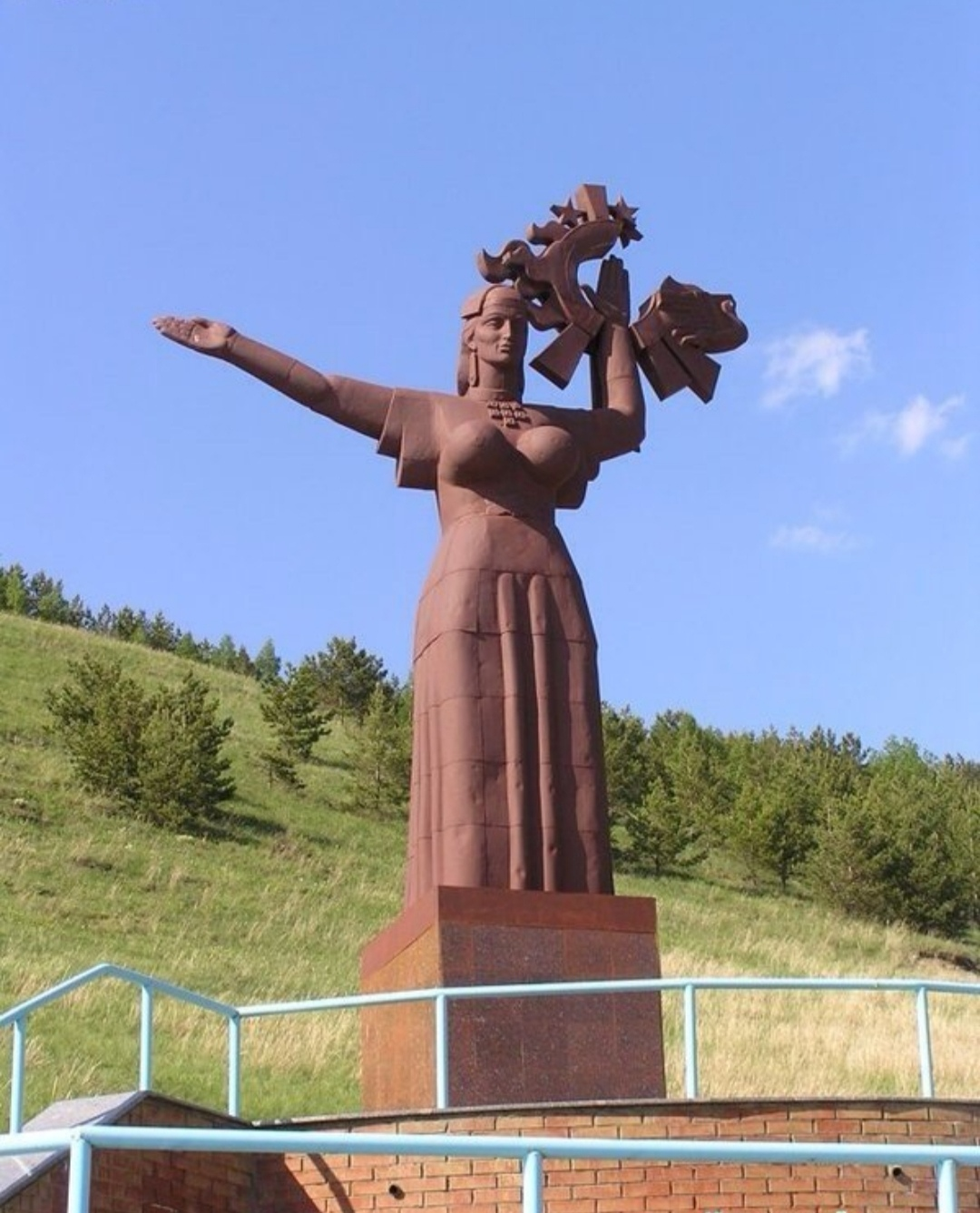
Statue ‘Mother Tatarstan’

The southeast of modern Tatarstan bordered the lands of the Nogai Horde and until the 1630s these lands witnessed the migratory movement of nomadic peoples across the steppe. After the Nogai were expelled, the ethnically diverse local population remained small in number and was often subjected to Kalmyk raids. According to historian Aydar Nogmanov, only after the Bashkir uprising of 1704-1711 was suppressed did farmers begin to move to the South-Eastern Trans-Kama region.

In the first half of the 18th century, the modern Almetyevsky district belonged to the Nadyrovskaya volost and was populated mainly by the yasak non-Russian peoples. Although archival records on the founding of Almetyevo have not survived, historians suggest that the first settlement was established in the 1730s. The village was first mentioned in 1735, when the local mullah Almet informed the Russian commander-in-chief about the Bashkir insurrection taking place in the volost. The historian Amirkhanov opined that the local mullah Almet Seitov could be the historical founder of the village. In contrast, the Bashkir historian Anvar Asfandiyarov in his monograph "Auls of Menzelin Bashkirs" argues that 23-year-old Seitov, who had just become a spiritual leader, could not have had such authority in the Aul community. Asfandiyarov points to the pro-government spiritual leader Almet-mulla Karatametov as a more likely figure.

During the 18th and 19th centuries, the number of settlements continued to grow. The lands surrounding the New Moscow road (Novomokovskaya) were gradually inhabited by peasants from Simbirsk, Penza, Kazan, Nizhny Novgorod, Kasimovsk and other counties. According to the 1746 population census, 54 new settlements were registered, the largest of which were Taisuganovo, Almetyevo, Old Nadyrovo (Nagornoye) and others. In the year of the census, 62 Yasak Tatars lived in Almetyevo. By 1795, there were already 700 Tatars and Bashkirs, while in 1834 the village population numbered 123 Bashkirs and 544 Teptyars. In the mid-19th century, 1518 state peasants and Bashkirs lived in the village. Almetyevsk was the venue for regular fairs and bazaars that contributed to the flourishing of the local economy. Soon a mosque, a post station, two factories and a school were built there. In 1851, Almetyevskaya volost became part of the Bugulminsky district of the Samara province.

In 1917, the Soviets seized power in Tatarstan. Almetyevo was one of the battlefields of the Civil War, and the village was changed hands several times between the belligerents' armies. In 1918, the Red Army confronted Czechoslovak units, and in 1919 they fought against the White military leader Alexander Kolchak. In the same year, the Bugulma peasants rose in a large anti-Bolshevik uprising that swept many of the surrounding regions but was soon brutally suppressed. In 1920, Almetyevskaya volost became part of the Bugulminsky canton within the Tatar ASSR.

On August 10, 1930, the Almetyevsky District was established. In 1953, the Almetyev village received the status of a town and was renamed Almetyevsk. The newly formed district repeatedly changed its borders: in 1959, it incorporated a part of the abolished Aktash region. Four years later, the Aznakaevsky districts, part of Zainsky, Novosheshminsky and Pervomaisky were abolished. Currently the city of Almetyevsk and the surrounding territories are a large industrial and cultural center of the Republic of Tatarstan.

== Administrative and Municipal Status ==
Within the framework of administrative divisions, Almetyevsky District is one of the forty-three in the republic. The district consists of 99 inhabited localities. The city of Almetyevsk serves as its administrative center, despite being incorporated separately as a city of republic significance — an administrative unit with the status equal to that of the districts. As a municipal division, the district is incorporated as Almetyevsky Municipal District, with the city of republic significance of Almetyevsk being incorporated within it as the Almetyevsk Urban Settlement.

== Economy ==
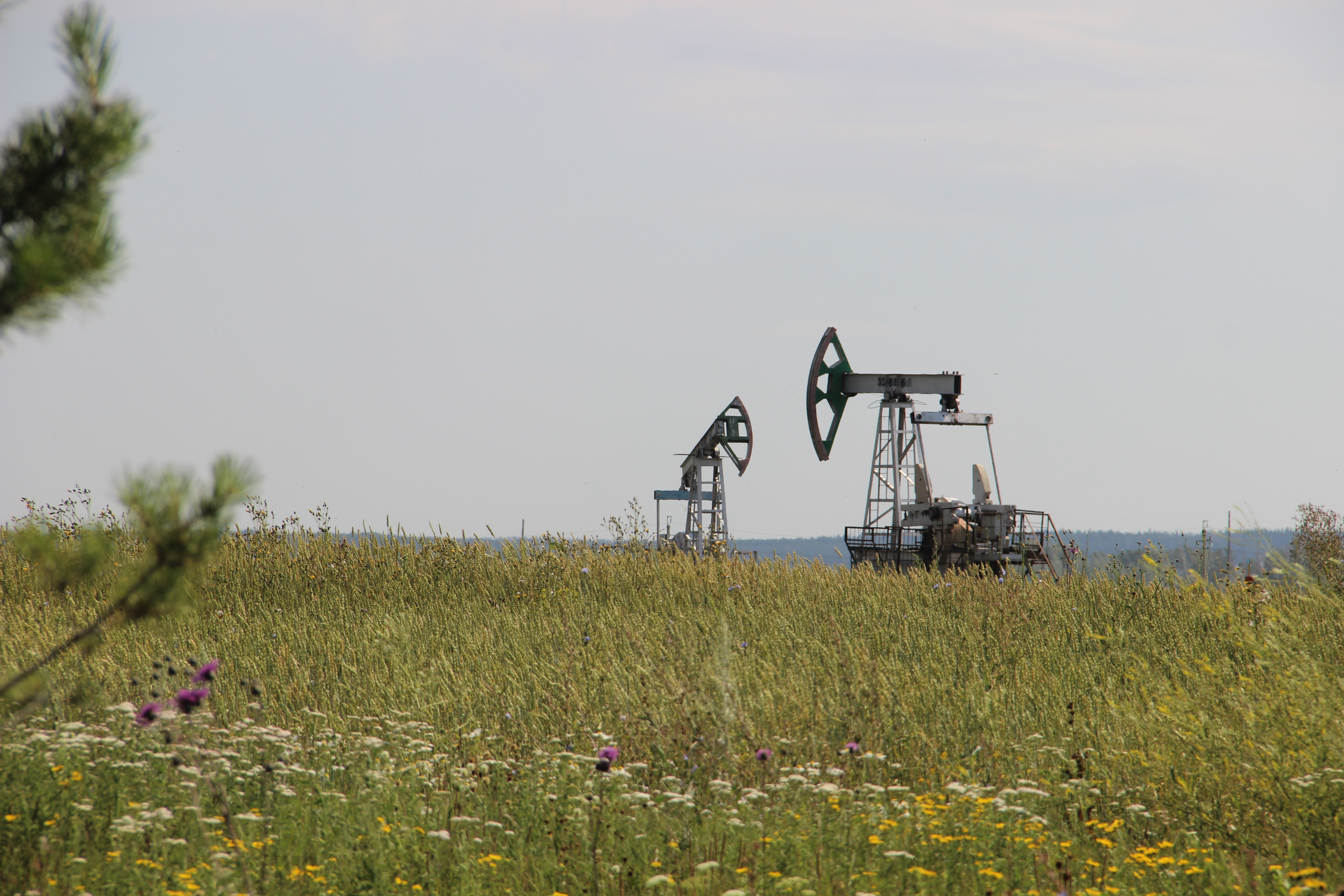
Oil production in Yamash

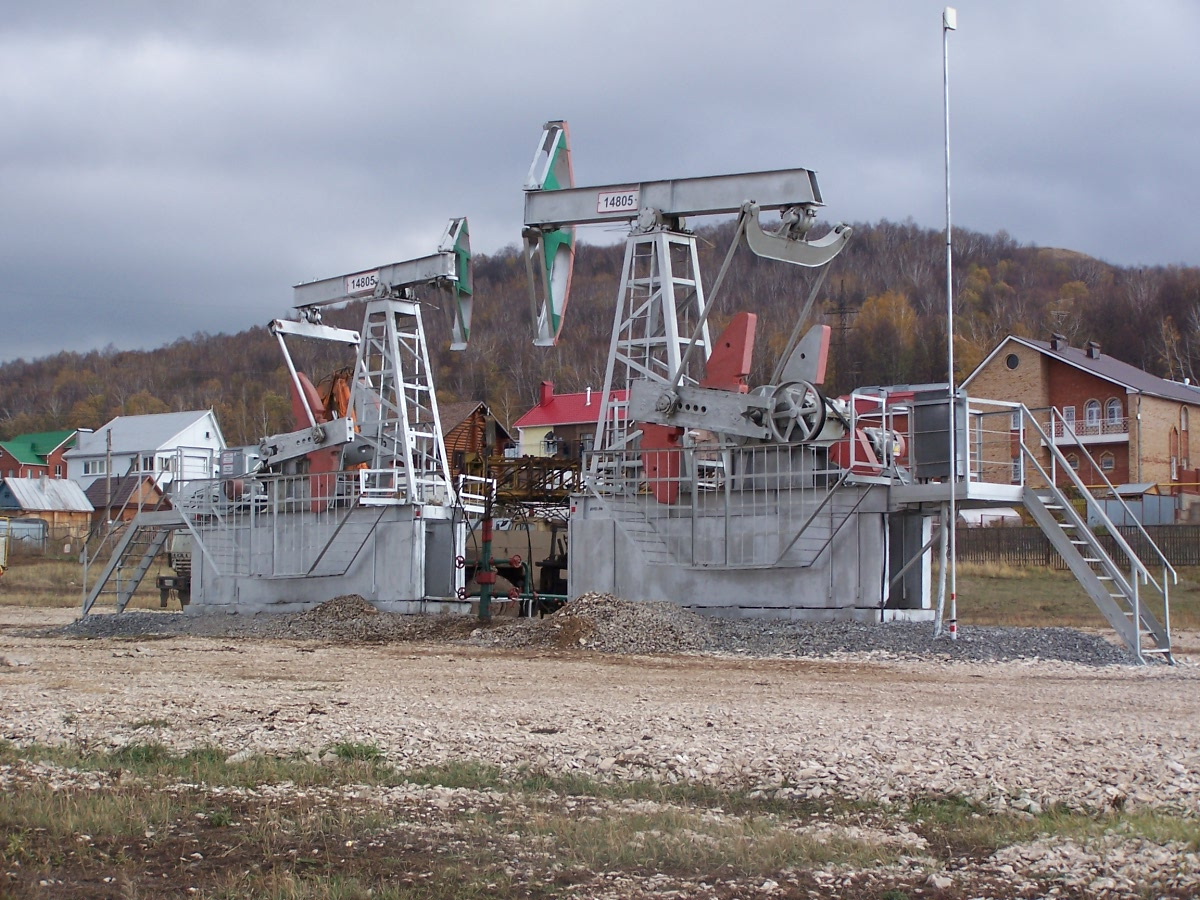
Settlement near the oil pumping station

=== 18th–20th Centuries ===
Although agriculture traditionally played a crucial role in the regional economy, the second half of the 18th and early 19th centuries witnessed the rise to prominence of the mining and oil industries in the district. The geographic position of the eastern Trans-Kama determined the development of transit trade with Central Asia and other regions. The expansion of postal service, railway and trade routes facilitated Almetyevsk's economic growth and allowed local people from modest social backgrounds to engage in transit trade.

The 20th century brought about significant changes in the way of life and the economy of the region. The devastating years of the Revolution and the Civil War negatively affected the economy and led to the decline of agriculture. In 1921–1922, a severe famine broke out in the Volga region affecting the lives and killing several millions of people. During the NEP, the republic's economy started gradually recovering. In its heyday, 90 trade and small industrial enterprises were open in the Almetyevskaya volost. However, the situation changed dramatically in the late 1920s, which were characterized by forced collectivization and the Bolshevik attack against the traditional way of life. In a short period, in Almetyevsk, many peasant possessions were collectivized and brought under the control of 45 collective farms. Those peasants who tried to evade collectivization were deprived of their property and repressed. In the midst of collectivization, an uprising broke out in the region, called the Almetyevsk case or "Almetyevshchina". In 1931, a number of local party members were accused of "right-wing opportunist deviation" and deliberate disruption of grain procurements. Four district leaders were shot and many received prison terms.

The Post–World War II period was characterized by significant development of energy and oil production in the southeast Kama region. In 1948, one of the world's largest oil deposits, "Romashkino" was discovered. Two years later, another oil field was found not far from the village of Minnibayevo in the Almetyevsky District. Another important achievement was the increasing gasification of the district with petroleum gas from the Minnibaevskaya oil-bearing area. In the 1950s, the Minnibaevsk Gas Processing Plant held the record for the production of fuel gas and raw materials from associated gas. This sequence of oil discovery gave impetus to economic growth and development. As a result, in 1953, Almetyevo received the status of a city and was renamed Almetyevsk.

=== Oil industry ===
By the mid-20th century, new oil deposits with total reserves of about 430 million tons were discovered in Tatarstan. In 1950, by a decree issued by the Council of Ministers of the USSR, the Tatneft group was founded and within several years became the largest oil-producing organization in the USSR. Between 1960 and 1980, oil production significantly increased in the republic. The collapse of the Soviet Union and the transition to a market economy affected the regional budget and eventually led to economic growth in the 90s. After gaining economic independence from the state, Tatneft was able to enter the world stock market and become the first Russian oil company in the London Stock Exchange. In the 2000s, it remained the leading company of the Almetyevsk region investing in the regional economy and participating in social welfare programs. In 2005, the Nizhnekamsk Oil Refinery (Nizhnekamskij neftepererabatyvajushhij zavod) was opened in the region, later renamed to Taneko.

In 2016, the district accounted for about 30% of the total industrial production of the republic. Large enterprises of the oil industry (such as Almetyevneft, Yamashneft, Elkhovneft and others) and manufacturing industries (Al'met'evskij trubnyj zavod, Al'met'evskij zavod zhelezobetonnyh izdelij, Al'met'evskij zavod «Radiopribor», «Alnas», “Bauljuks” and others) are also present in the district. In 2018, the local administration submitted a claim to apply for the status of TASED (the territory of advanced socio-economic development) specializing in non-resource production with an export orientation.

=== Investment potential ===
In January–September 2020, Almetyevsk municipal district was ranked second in the republic in terms of socio-economic development. The gross territorial product in 2019 amounted to more than 425 billion rubles, and the volume of shipped goods is estimated at 962 billion with a growth rate of 4%. The average salary in the region was 46 thousand rubles, which is 6.9% higher compared to the previous year. According to the Committee of the Republic of Tatarstan for Social and Economic Monitoring, investment in the region's fixed capital in the first half of 2020 amounted to 18 billion rubles, or 8.7% of the total volume of investment in the republic's economy.

In addition to the petroleum industry, the district's production potential is represented by three industrial parks totalling 51 thousand square meters, 16 thousand of which are still vacant.

The district administration is committed to diversifying the regional economy and supporting agriculture. Thanks to the local program to increase business activity among the rural population, by 2018, the number of personal plots increased by 15%. Among promising investment projects in the district are the reconstruction of a dairy plant, modernization of a grain processing plant, planting an apple orchard and other programs.

In 2019, the Tatarstan government announced plans to create a special economic zone (SEZ) in Almetyevsk following the example of “Alabuga” and “Innopolis”. It is estimated that more than 70 billion rubles will be invested in the first stage of reconstruction until 2024. The construction of the third SEZ in the republic aims to develop the regional economy and create favorable conditions for federal and foreign investment.

=== Transport ===
Almetyevsk is located 279 km southeast of Kazan. There is a railway station 16 km from the main city. Almetyevsk is situated within the important road network: R-239 Kazan—Almetyevsk—Orenburg—border with Kazakhstan; 16A-0003 Naberezhnye Chelny—Almetyevsk; 16K-0077 Almetyevsk—Aznakayevo; 16K-0131 Kuzaykino (R-239)—Nurlat; 16K-0334 Almetyevsk—Muslyumovo. In the south of the district, a part of the international highway is being built which will connect Western Europe to Western China.There is also a railway line Agryz—Naberezhnye Chelny—Akbash with a branch from Almetyevsk to Nizhnyaya Maktama.

== Environment ==
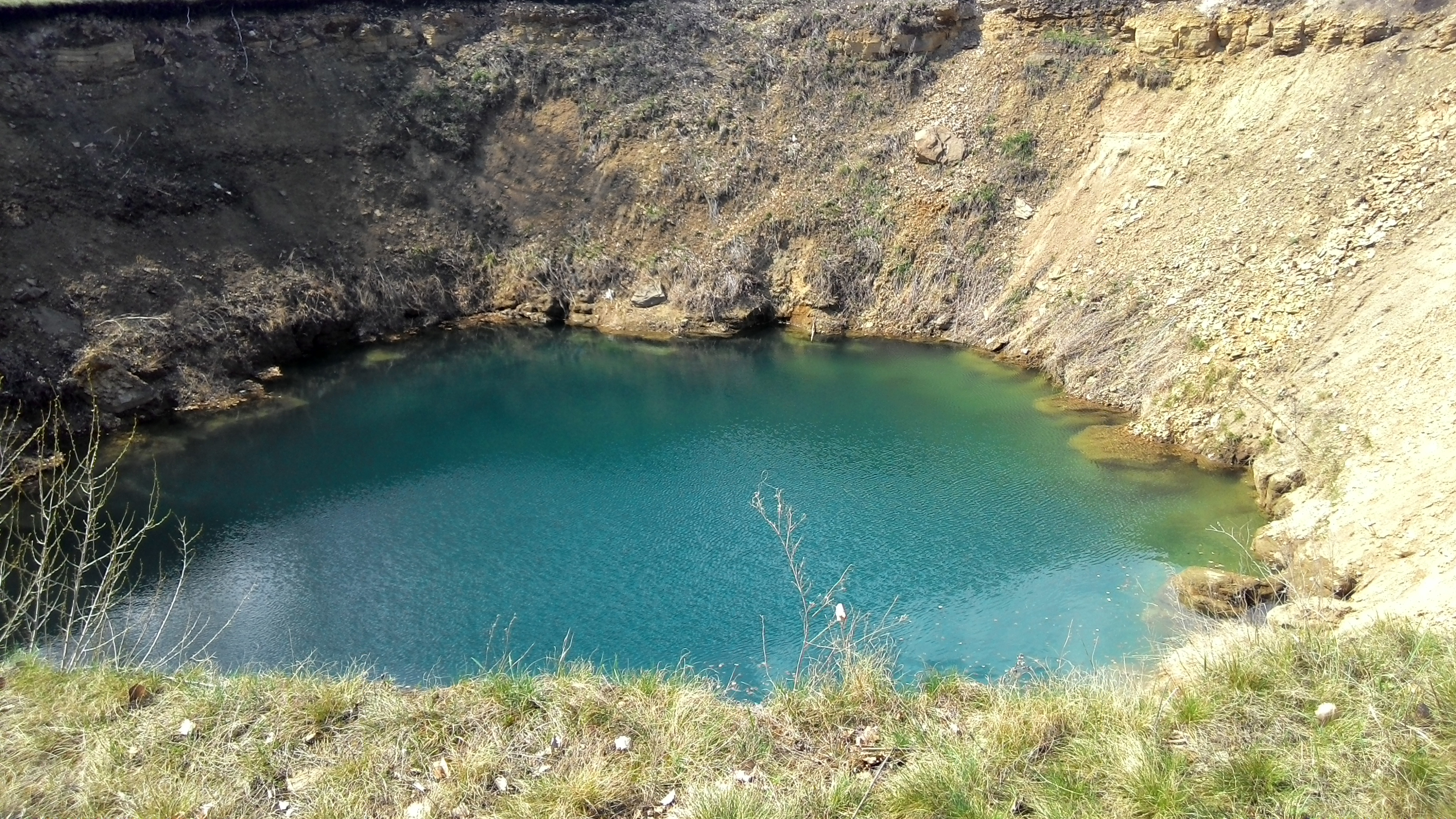
Lake Aktashskii proval

Environmental problems are becoming more and more acute in oil-producing regions of Tatarstan. The proximity of oil fields can seriously impact the integrity and structure of the soil and the condition of groundwater. According to ecologists Bubnov and Kozhevnikova who carried out their research in the early 2000s, “waters of the Upper and lower Kama sediments have greatly changed their composition over the past 30–40 years. Thus, the composition of the Upper Kazan water sediments turned to chloride-hydrocarbonate sodium-magnesium-calcium, while the composition of the Nizhnekamsk ones changed to sulfate-hydrocarbonate-chloride sodium-magnesium-calcium. The main reason for the change in the composition of groundwater was a man-made factor: oil and gas production, agriculture and household waste.” Scientists suggest that the municipalities with the help of ecologists should take up environmental monitoring. Since 1995, the Department of Ecology and Improvement has been operating in the Almetyevsk municipal district, which is responsible for the ecological state of the region. As part of the Year of Ecology in Russia (2017), the district administration approved a special program for 2017–2021 to ensure “environmental and sanitary and epidemiological safety of the population.” In addition, the Almetyevsk State Oil Institute holds events—meetings, talks, republican and city competitions—to engage more young people in environmental activities. Tatneft Group also regularly takes part in the Ecotechnology and Equipment exhibition.

== Social welfare and public life ==
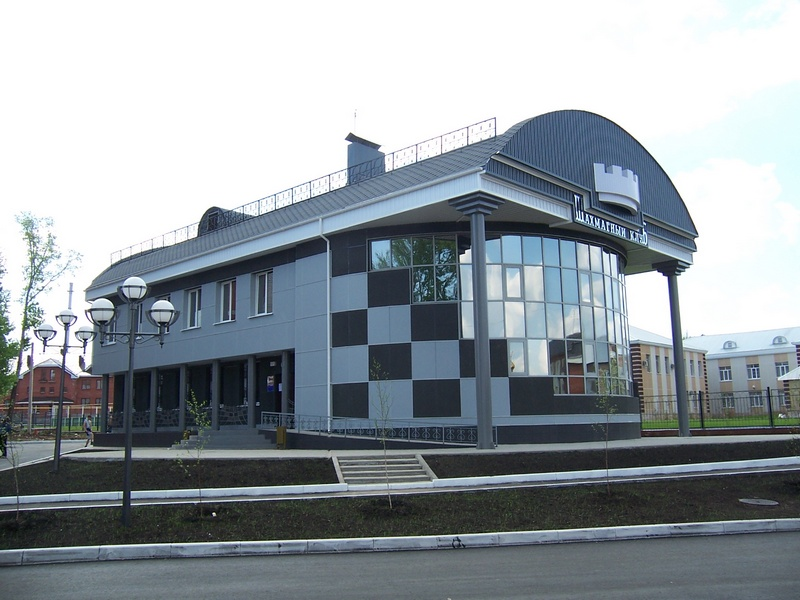
Almetyevsk Chess Club

The growth in oil production and refining has determined the rise of Almetyevsk as a regional center for training specialists in the petroleum industry. In 1992, the Almetyevsk Oil Institute was founded. In 2020, there are four universities and six institutions of secondary education in the city and its district.

In 1975, the Almetyevsk Art Gallery was established. Since 1994, the museum of local lore and other regional institutions have been opened in the city. Additionally, a branch of the Union of Composers and the local Union of Journalists have representatives in the district. For 2020, 135 cultural and art institutions, 36 mosques and 13 churches are open in Almetyevsky district and the main city. Islamic religious and educational schools—madrasas—play an important role in the local education system.

There are two regional TV channels broadcasting in the region—Almetyevsk TV and Luch (Ray) and local newspapers are published in Tatar (”Әлмәт таңнары”), in Russian ("Znamya Truda") and in both languages («Әлмәт хәбәрләре»/"Almetyevskiy Vestnik").

== Bibliography ==
- Asfandiyarov, A.Z. (2009). Auly menzelinskih bashkir [Auls of Menzelin Bashkirs]. Ufa: Kitap.
- Belov, S.G.; Ershova, G.N. (2011). "Neft' i neftehimija v Tatarstane: analiz istoricheskogo razvitija i opyta (po dokumentam central'nogo gosudarstvennogo arhiva istoriko-politicheskoj dokumentacii respubliki Tatarstan) [Oil and Petrochemicals in Tatarstan: Analysis of Historical Development and Experience (Based on the Records of the Central State Archive of Historical and Political Documentation of the Republic of Tatarstan)]". Vestnik Kazanskogo Tehnologicheskogo Universiteta (6): 172–177.
- Bubnov, Ju. P.; Kozhevnikova, M. V. (2002). "Problemy ekologicheskoi bezopasnosti neftedobyvajushhih regionov i zadachi monitoringa geologicheskoi sredy [Issues of ecological safety of oil-producing regions and tasks of monitoring the geological environment]" (PDF). Nauchno-tehnicheskij Zhurnal "Georesursy". 2 (10): 6–8.
- Gallyamova, A. G. (2014). Istoriia Tatarstana i tatarskogo naroda, 1917-2013 gg.: Uchebnoe posobie [History of Tatarstan and the Tatar people, 1917-2013: A Textbook]. Kazan: Kazan Federal University.
- Khasanov, M., ed. (2002). Tatarskaia entciklopediia [Tatar Encyclopedia]. Kazan: Institut Tatarskoi Entciklopedii. pp. 128–129.
- Muhetdinova, Z. Z.; Romanova, S. M.; Yaroshevsky, A. B. (2014). "Pedagogicheskie funktcii i usloviia vospitaniia ekologicheskoi kultury u studentov tekhnicheskikh vuzov (na primere Almetevskogo gosudarstvennogo neftianogo instituta) [Pedagogical functions and conditions for the education of ecological culture among students of technical universities (on the example of the Almetyevsk State Oil Institute)]". Vestnik Kazanskogo Tehnologicheskogo Universiteta. 17 (13): 361–363.
- Nogmanov, A. I., ed. (2019). Tatarskie seleniia Iugo-Vostochnogo Zakamia: ochagi prosveshcheniia i kultury [Tatar Settlements of the South-Eastern Trans-Kama Region: Centers of Education and Culture]. Kazan: Institut Istorii im. Sh. Mardzhani AN RT.
- Pospelov, E. M. (2002). Geograficheskie nazvaniia mira. Toponimicheskii slovar' [Geographic names of the world. Toponymic dictionary]. Moscow: Russkie slovari, Astrel, AST.
- Teplova, L. G.; Gumarov, N. F.; Ganiev, B. G. (2012). "Ob intensifikatcii dobychi nefti na pozdnei stadii razrabotki Almetevskoi ploshchadi [On the intensification of oil production at the late stage of development of the Almetyevskaya area]" (PDF). Nauchno-tekhnicheskii Zhurnal "Georesursy". 3 (45): 75–77.
