= Cheremshan (rural locality) =

Cheremshan (Russian: Черемшан) is the name of several rural localities in the Republic of Tatarstan, Russia:

- Cheremshan, Apastovsky District, Republic of Tatarstan, a selo in Apastovsky District
- Cheremshan, Cheremshansky District, Republic of Tatarstan, a selo in Cheremshansky District
