= Azeyevo =

Azeyevo (Russian: Азеево) is the name of several rural localities in Russia.

- Azeyevo, Ryazan Oblast, a selo in Azeyevsky Rural Okrug of Yermishinsky District in Ryazan Oblast
- Azeyevo, Republic of Tatarstan, a selo in Novosheshminsky District of the Republic of Tatarstan
