= Kichuy =

Location
- Country: Tatarstan, Russia

Physical characteristics
- Source
  - location: Minnibayevo, Almetyevsky District
- Mouth: Sheshma
  - location: Lenino, Novosheshminsky District
  - coordinates: 55.2143°N 51.2743°E
- Length: 114 km (71 mi)
- Basin size: 1,330 km^{2} (510 sq mi)
- Discharge
  - average: 472 m^{3}/s (16,700 cu ft/s) (maximum)

Basin features
- Progression: Sheshma→ Kama→ Volga→ Caspian Sea

The Kichuy (Russian: Кичуй), (Tatar: Кичү) is a river in Tatarstan, Russian Federation, a right-bank tributary of the Sheshma. It is 114 kilometres (71 mi) long, and its drainage basin covers 1,330 square kilometres (510 mi^{2}).

Major tributaries are the Butinka, Batraska, Chupayka, Yamashka, and Tetvelka. The maximal mineralization 400–71000 mg/L. The average sediment deposition at the river mouth per year is 127 millimetres (5.0 in). Drainage is regulated.
