= Aksubayevsky District =

Aksubayevsky District Аксубаевский район (Russian)
- District

Other transcription(s)
  - Tatar: Аксубай районы
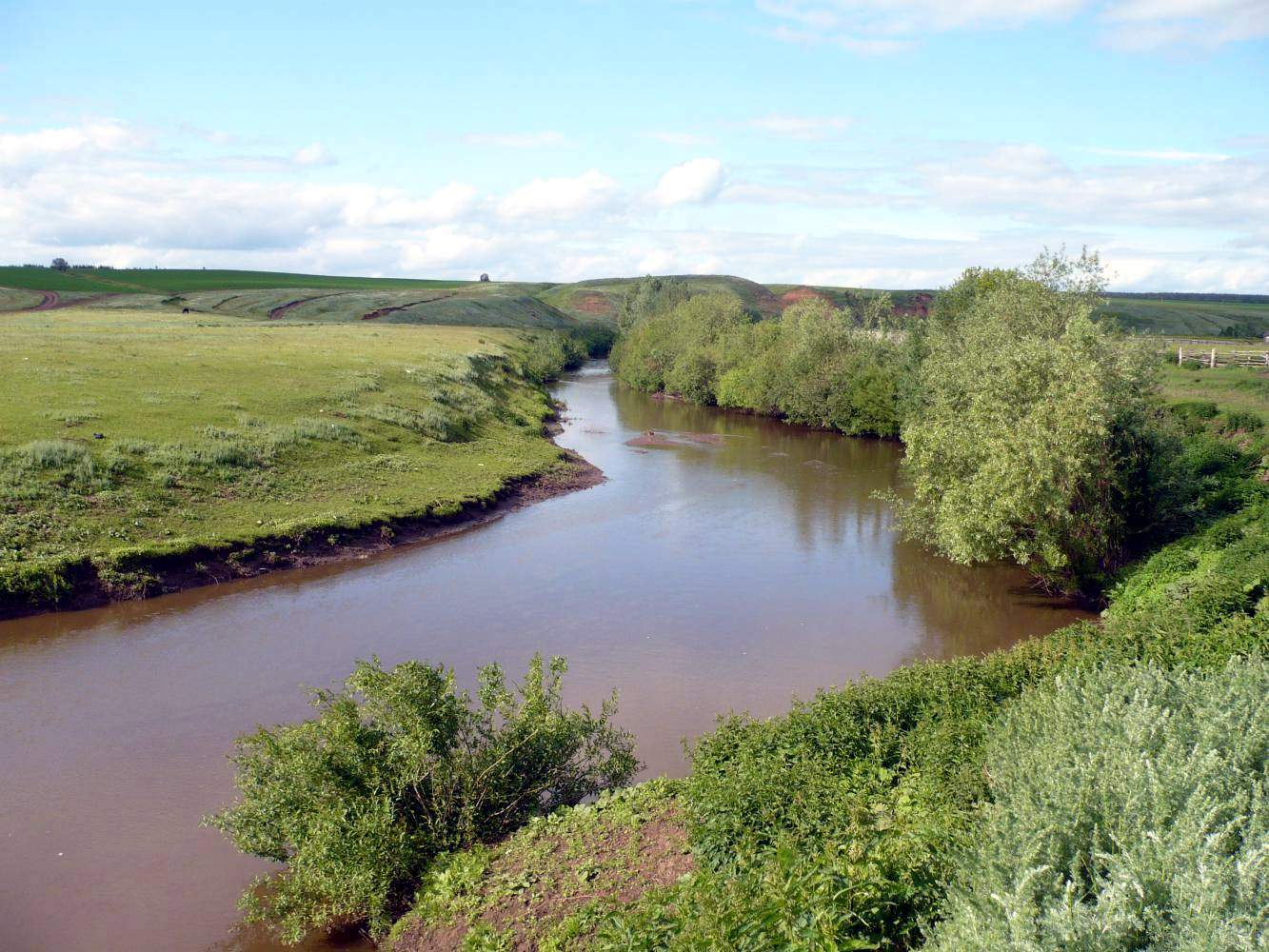
- Big Sulcha River, Aksubayevsky District

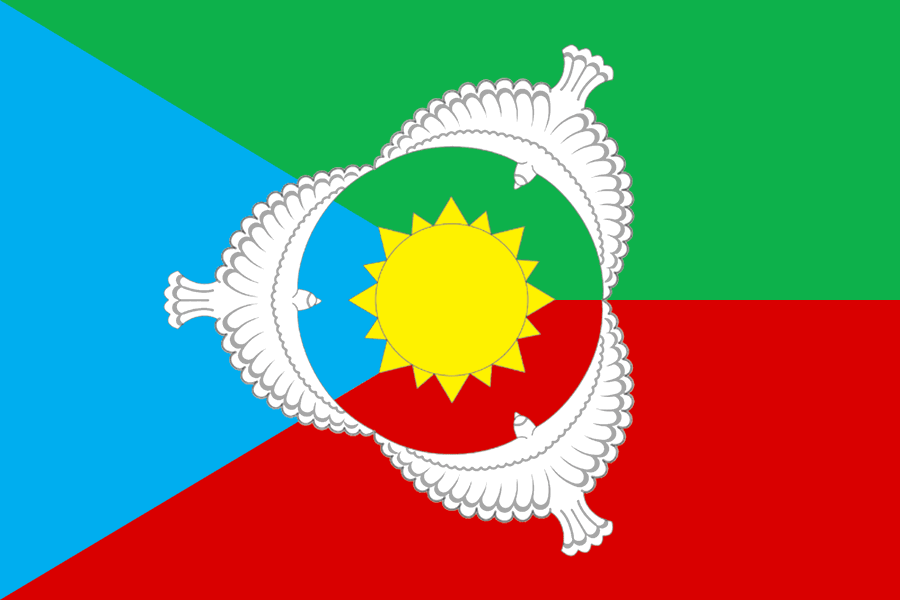
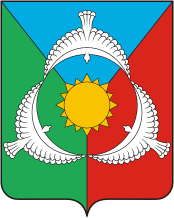
- Flag Coat of arms
- Location of Aksubayevsky District in the Republic of Tatarstan
- Coordinates: 54°53′N 50°48′E
- Country: Russia
- Federal subject: Republic of Tatarstan
- Established: 10 July 1930
- Administrative center: Aksubayevo

Area
  - Total: 1,440.1 km^{2} (556.0 sq mi)

Population (2010 Census)
  - Total: 32,161
  - Density: 22.332/km^{2} (57.841/sq mi)
  - Urban: 31.1%
  - Rural: 68.9%

Administrative structure
  - Inhabited localities: 1 urban-type settlements, 78 rural localities

Municipal structure
  - Municipally incorporated as: Aksubayevsky Municipal District
  - Municipal divisions: 1 urban settlements, 20 rural settlements
- Time zone: UTC+3 (MSK)
- OKTMO ID: 92604000
- Website: http://aksubayevo.tatarstan.ru/

Aksubayevsky District (Russian: Аксуба́евский райо́н; Tatar: Аксубай районы; Chuvash: Аксу районĕ, Aksu rayonĕ) is a territorial administrative unit and municipality of the Republic of Tatarstan within the Russian Federation. The district is located in the south of the Republic of Tatarstan, in the Zakamsk economic region. The administrative center of the district is the urban-type settlement Aksubaevo. The Aksubayevsky district is the only district in the republic where the Chuvash population is the prevailing ethnic group by comparison to the Tatar and Russian population of the district.

The agricultural sector dominates the economy of the Aksubayevsky municipal district. Six oil fields have been discovered in the region. Most of the reserves in these newly discovered fields are of hard-to-recover and high-sulfur types.

== Geography and Climate ==
The Aksubayevsky municipal district is located on a regional highway 180 km from Kazan, 58 km from the Nurlat railway station and 85 km from the pier of the city of Chistopol. The district is endowed with natural resources including forests and non-metallic minerals resources.

The Aksubayevsky district encompasses a total area of 1439.2 km² in 2015. It shares borders with the Chistopolsky, Novosheshminsky, Cheremshansky, Nurlatsky and Alkeyevsky districts of the Republic of Tatarstan. The administrative center of the district is the urban-type settlement Aksubayevo (in pre-revolutionary sources, it is known as Troitsky by the name of the local church).

The climate of the region is continental and is characterized by warm, humid summers (the average air temperature in July is 18.6 °C) and moderately cold winters with a stable snow cover.

The district is located in the east of the Zavolzhskaya lowland. The lowest point in the district is 74 m and the highest point is at 223 m (on the watershed of the Bolshoy Cheremshan and Sheshma rivers). A significant part of the territory is located in the space between the Malaya Sulcha and Maliy Cheremshan Rivers.

== Coat of Arms and Flag ==
The coat of arms was approved on December 20, 2005. It reflects the cultural, historical and economic characteristics of the district. Three silver doves symbolize the peaceful and harmonious coexistence of three peoples on the territory of the district (Chuvash, Tatars and Russians). Silver is a symbol of purity, perfection, peace and mutual understanding. The golden sun represents the Aksubayevsky district as a land, whose inhabitants preserve the memory of their ancestors and take care of their descendants. The sun is a traditional symbol of fertility, truth, selflessness, glory. The tricolor field symbolizes the sectors of the district's economy: oil, grain growing, animal husbandry. Simultaneously, they symbolize the agricultural annual cycle. Gold is a symbol of harvest, wealth, stability, respect and intelligence. Red signifies courage, strength, work, beauty. Azure blue is a symbol of honor, nobility, spirituality. Green symbolizes nature, health, life growth, rebirth. The flag is based on heraldic elements of the coat of arms.

== History ==
=== Background ===
The first people to live in the district engaged primarily in cattle breeding and agriculture. One of the mounds made by these first peoples is now located at the entrance to Asubaevo. Other ancient sites discovered within the Askubayevsky district are located near the villages of Zarya and Aktash. The age of these sites is estimated as about 30 thousand years. The Novouzeevsky burial ground, the Starotimoshkinsky mound, the Nizhnebalandinskoe settlement and the Belovskoe settlement are the main monuments of wooden architecture from the end of the 2nd millennium BCE. The Tatar Suncheleevskoe settlement ("Kyz Tau" or Maiden Mountain) is thought to have originated in the 7th century. Iron agricultural tools from the middle of the 1st millennium AD belonging to the Imenkov tribes have also been found in the district. At the end of the 8th century, the region was settled by Bulgar tribes.

The territory of the Aksubayevsky district was part of Volga Bulgaria and later the lands of the Golden Horde. Archaeological excavations of graves dating from the 10th century testify to a predominantly Muslim method of burial. The deceased were not buried in coffins and were laid with their heads to the west, oriented towards Mecca to the south. After the annexation of the Kazan Khanate to the Russian state after the campaigns of Ivan the Terrible, the widespread Christianization of the non-Russian peoples of the Trans-Kama region and its renaming began. According to historians, 300 thousand pagan Chuvash became Christians in the short period from 1740 to 1764. There is a legend about the Aksubayevsky district. The legend is about three brothers: Akspay, Ilderek and Endrus, who founded the villages of Aksubayevo, Ilderyakovo and Yenoruskino. The village of Aksubaevo was founded in the second half of the 17th century. Surviving documents from 1771-1773 indicate that the village of Aksubayevo was part of the Staroibraykin volost of the Chistopol district of the Kazan province. At the end of the 18th century, the volost center was moved from Stary Ibraikino to Aksubayevo. Thus the Aksubaevskaya volost was formed.

=== Soviet period ===
The territory of the Aksubayevsky belonged to the Chistopol district of the Kazan province until 1920. It then became part of the Chistopol canton of the Tatar ASSR from 1920 to 1930. The cantons were subsequently abolished in 1930 and the Aksubayevsky district was formed on August 10, 1930. The boundaries and administrative divisions of the district have been changed several times. The district was abolished on February 1, 1963 and its territory was incorporated into the Oktyabrsky district. The Aksubayevsky district would then be reestablished two years later on January 12, 1965.

An active policy of Russification of national peoples and the imposition of Russian languages through schools took place in the republic in the 1950s. As a consequence of this policy, all Chuvash pedagogical schools were closed in the village of Aksubaevo in 1956. The teaching of the Chuvash language and literature was restored only twenty years later.

According to demographic records, a significant part of the population tried to move to cities during the 1980s. At the same time, the percentage of population decline in the Aksubayevsky district was significantly higher than the norm in the Republic of Tatarstan. In general, this trend was driven in large part by poor social conditions. For example, there was a lack of medical workers (for example there were only 0.6 pediatricians per 10 thousand of the population in the district). According to medical statistics, almost half of the population (42%) were without systematic medical supervision. These conditions affected the high mortality rate of children under one year old who often died at home.

Oil fields were discovered in the district in 1945. The estimated productivity of each well was determined to be about 10-20 tons per day.

After the collapse of the USSR in 1991, Tatarstan made an attempt to secede from Russia and gain independence. In 1992, a referendum was held, as a result of which Tatarstan proclaimed state sovereignty. However, the district decided to remain part of Russia as a sovereign republic. At the same time, Tatarstan began to pursue an independent socio-economic policy and the districts within the republic received greater independence.

== Population ==
The Chuvash population is the predominant ethnic group in the Aksubayevsky district. It is the only district of the Republic of Tatarstan where the largest ethnic groups are not Tatars or Russians. At the beginning of 2013, 44.3% of the district population were Chuvash, 38.5% were Tatars, 16.6% were Russians and 0.6% are representatives of other nationalities.

== Municipal-territorial Structure ==
There are 1 urban and 20 rural settlements comprising a further 79 settlements in the Aksubayevsky municipal district. 34.26% of the district's population live in urban conditions in the city of Aksubaevo. The head of the district has been the Honored Worker of Agriculture of the Republic of Tatarstan, Kamil Kamalovich Gilmanov since May 2008. Gilmanov headed the "Vamin" branch of the "Vamin Aksu" agricultural firm from 2005 to 2008. The administrative centers of rural settlements are the villages Aksubayevo, Novoye Uzeyevo, Yemelkino, Karasa, Krivoozerki, Myud, Novoye Aksubayevo, Novoye Ibraykino, Novaya Kiremet, Staryye Savrushi, Staroye Ibraykino, Staroye Ilderyakovo, Staraya Kiremet, Staryye Kiyazly, Staryy Tatarskiy Adam, Staroye Timoshkino, Staroye Uzeyevo, Suncheleyevo, Trudolyubovo, Savgachevo, and Shcherben.

== Economy ==
=== Current State of the Economy ===
Aksubayevsky district is one of the outliers when looking at the municipalities of Tatarstan. The economic complex of the Aksubaevsky district was formed under the influence of a number of factors, including the peculiarities of its geographical location and the historical development of the territory. The district is part of the Zakamsk economic zone. In economic terms, this zone is an industrial-agrarian region, focused on oil production and precision engineering, as well as the production and processing of agricultural products. The level of investment in fixed assets per capita in the Aksubayevsky district is one of the lowest in the Zakamsk economic zone of Tatarstan. Investment in the district is 4 times lower than the republic average.

=== Industry ===
The main natural resources of the region are its forests and land. Brick clay and oil are extracted in the district. There are six local oil deposits: Eryklinskoe, Suncheleevskoe, Demkinskoe, Myudovskoe, Ibraikinskoe, and Ivinskoe. Small oil companies are engaged in their development, including "Nurlatneft" (subsidiary of Tatneft), "Ritek", "Tatekh", "Tatnefteprom" (operating since 1999, developing 16 fields, in 2018 received a number of republican economic awards - "Pride and Hope of the National Economy", "Company of the Year"), and "TNGK-Development". The small oil company "Tatekh" has been operating in the region for over 20 years. The company was created to solve the environmental problems associated with oil production using technology to capture light oil fractions. Tatneft transferred two fields to "Tatekh" for development, first the Onbiyskoye field in the Zainsky region and in 1999 the Demkinskoye field in Aksubayevsky district. Tatneft bought out the American company "Texneft Inc" in 2010.

The entity "Aksubayevskoe forestry" operates on the territory of two more districts: Novosheshminsky and Chistopolsky.

Agricultural work and the processing of agricultural raw materials is undertaken by firms such as "PMK-Melioration" and the large processing enterprise "Aksubayevsky Butter Factory" (Owned by "Vamin" until 2016). "Aksstroy", "URSZh" are the largest firms in the construction sector in the district. These firms produce building materials including expanded clay concrete, arbalite blocks and paving stones. The district annually builds 11 thousand square meters of housing.

=== Agriculture ===
According to statistics from 2015, 91.9 thousand hectares of the district is designated as agricultural land, including 84.5 thousand hectares of arable land. Acidic soil types are present on 60% to 80% of arable land. Winter rye, spring wheat, oats, peas, barley, sugar beets, sunflowers, rapeseed, corn, potatoes, lupines and soybeans are cultivated in the district. Of the 5400 thousand tons of grain harvested in the Republic of Tatarstan in 2020, 122.9 tons were collected in the Aksubayevsky district. The average yield of the previous year was 32.4 c/ha. Meat and dairy cattle ranching and pig breeding are among the main livestock industries in the Aksubayevsky district. A dairy complex for 1600 head was built in the district in 2010.

51 agricultural enterprises operated in the district in 2015. Among the largest agricultural enterprises were "Aksu Agro", "Agrofirma Aksubaevskaya", "Aktay", "Kolos", "Set Ile-Aksu", "Aksu Agro", "Sulcha" and 45 other peasant farms (about 30 family farms).

The agrofirm "Aktay" is engaged in the breeding of trotting horses. The horses of the farm set two All-Russian records and were repeatedly included in the list of the best horses in Russia in 2016. There is a "Mushroom shop of the KFH Samarenkin A.K." for oyster mushroom farming, with an area of about 1.5 thousand square meters and a capacity to produce up to 6 tons in the village of Staroye Mokshino. The farm produces mycelium substrates, and includes an onion drying workshop.

=== Investment Potential ===
According to the Federal State Statistics Service for the Republic of Tatarstan, the Aksubaevsky district attracted 742.3 million rubles of investment (in addition to budgetary funds and funds collected from small business) in 2019. One year prior this amount was 439.8 million rubles. According to the Committee of the Republic of Tatarstan for Social and Economic Monitoring, investment in fixed capital assets by the republic across the full range of economic entities amounted to 1.2 billion rubles in the first half of 2020. This amound constituted 0.5% of total investment in the Republic of Tatarstan over this period.

The industrial park "Garant" is located in the district. The park was built in 2016 with private investments and is designed for 45 residents. Currently there are three residents on the site who produce bread and confectionery flour, and make corrugated boards for fences, roofs, and facing houses.

=== Transport ===
The Highways 16K-0098 "Chistopol - Aksubayevo - Nurlat" and 16K-0131 "Nurlat - Kuzaykino (P239)" run through the district.

== Environment ==
The district is located in the southern part of the linden-oak and linden forest zones. There are forest tracts in the northern and northeastern parts of the district in the basin of the Malaya Sulcha river. In the extreme east there is a broadleaf pine forest. The total forest cover of the district is 20.3-21% of the total land area of the district. Protected nature areas include the Keremetyevsky forest and part of the Bilyarsky hunting reserve, organized in 1967 to strengthen protection of hunting and commercial fauna. The fauna of the district includes representative species of the forest and steppe zones in the region. Foxes, elk, wild boar, white hares, brown hares, squirrels, gophers, lynx, marten and others can all be found in the forests located in the district. Marals implanted from Altai Krai live on the territory of the district.

Three natural monuments created 1978 are located in the Aksubayevsky district: the Bolshaya Sulcha River, the Maly Cheremshan River and the Malaya Sulcha River.

- The Maly Cheremshan River (length 188.1 km, source - in Novosheshminsky district, mouth - in Ulyanovsk region) flows along a wavy plain (dominant heights of 120–180 m).
- The Bolshaya Sulcha River (length 117.2 km, source - near the village of Amirovo, Cheremshansky district, mouth - near the village of Saldakaevo, Nurlatsky district) is of economic importance, used by agricultural enterprises.
- The Malaya Sulcha River (length 66.2 km, source - near the village of Sulche-Bash, mouth - near the village of Karasa).

There are springs in the villages of Novoye Ibraikino, Staraye Mokshino, the villages of Belovka, Novaya Balanda and Cheryomushka.

=== Environmental Issues ===
A rupture of the Ritek oil pipeline in 2011 led to the pollution of 1.2 hectares of arable land. The company was fined a total 110 thousand rubles. Residents of the district have complained about oil pollution of the Tarsa River, which could have occurred as a result a dam break during the spring release of water in May 2018. Rosprirodnadzor officially denies the occurrence of the accident. The "Vamin-Tatarstan" butter factory dumped waste into the Malaya Sulcha river in 2019. The violation was repeatedly identified and ordered to be eliminated.

== Social Welfare and Public Life ==
There are 15 preschool institutions, 11 primary, 14 secondary schools (including three gymnasiums), a lyceum and a technical school of universal technologies in the Aksubayevsky district. Additional educational institutions include a center for extracurricular activities, a children's art school as well as a children's and youth sports school. The district also helps children from the Fedorovsky boarding school and the Aksubaevsky and "Mechta" orphan houses.

The district health care system includes a central district hospital and a polyclinic, the Staroibraykinskaya district hospital, three outpatient clinics and 53 feldsher-obstetric stations. The sports infrastructure in the district includes 77 sports facilities, including the "Yunost" sports complex.

Cultural life in the district is provided by a regional house of culture, 28 rural recreation centers and 38 public libraries. There are three museums: the Regional Museum of Local History (opened in 1987), the museum of writers Khasan Tufan in the village of Staraya Kiremet (since 1990) and Gaziz Kashapov in the village of Novoye Uzeevo (since 1992). The multinational district is represented by folk theaters and folklore groups and the local newspaper "Selskaya nov" ("Avyl taunary", "Yal purnase") is published in the Russian, Tatar and Chuvash languages.

Famous writers and poets such as Najip Dumavi, Polorusov Shelebi, Hasan Tufan, Efrem Almiyev, Gaziz Kashapov, Mikhail Yegorov (Seniel), the statesman Rais Belyaev and the philosopher and educator Galiasgar Gafurov were born in the Aksubayevsky district. There are 28 mosques and 6 churches in the district. Some of them have the status of architectural monuments:

- the Amirzyan Mosque in the village of Karasa
- Three mosques in the village of Novoye Ibraikino (including an architectural monument - the Cathedral Mosque, built in 1909)
- Two mosques in the village of Novoye Uzeyevo (including the Second Cathedral Mosque built in 1911)
- Four mosques in the village of Staroye Ibraikino
- Three mosques in the village of Starye Kiyazly
- The Muradulla Mosque in the village Tatarskoe Suncheleevo
- The Church of the Apostle Andrew in the village of Emelkino
- The Kazan-Mother of God Church in the village of Russkaya Kiremet, built in 1887 by the project of the Kazan architect A. E. Ostovsky
- The Trinity Church in the village of Staroye Mokshino
- The Church of St. John in the village of Staroye Uzeevo
- The Church of the Ascension in the village of Suncheleevo, built on the foundations of an old church from 1796
- The Mosque and church in Aksubaevo.

== Attractions in the District ==
Almost 200 archaeological monuments in the district have been identified as originating variously from the Bronze Age Imenkovsk culture (Tatar Suncheleevskoe settlement, "Kyz Tau", or "Maiden Mountain"), the Volga Bulgar period, the reign of the Golden Horde and the Kazan Khanate. Mounds are located near Aksubaevo, near the village of Vasilyevka, near the villages of Sargachevo, Staroye Uzeevo, Takhtala, Cheryomushka and others. Monuments of wooden architecture are represented by the Novouzeevsky burial ground, Starotimoshkinsky burial mound, and the Nizhnebalandinsky and Belovsky settlements.

Regional cultural heritage sites include a complex of buildings of a technical vocational school where the boys studied blacksmithing, locksmithing and turning (The Chuvash writer and teacher Efrem Vasilyevich Elliev lived and worked here from 1936 to 1941), the building of the land bank in Aksubaev (opened in 1913, an architectural monument of republican significance), the buildings of the estate of Prince Khovansky (built in the 19th century) in the village of Russkaya Kiremet, the Kazan Church of the Mother of God in the village of Dmitrievka, a monument to the poet Polorusov-Shelebi in the village of Belovka and many others.

== Bibliography ==
- Gainullin, R. (2007). "Vozdelyvanie liupina i soi v Respublike Tatarstan [Cultivation of lupine and soybeans in the Republic of Tatarstan]". Dostizheniia nauki i tekhniki APK (9): 48.
- Karimova, L.K. (2018). "Arkhivnye dannye o dvizhenii selskogo naseleniia Tatarskoi avtonomnoi sovetskoi sotcialisticheskoi respubliki v gody XI piatiletki [Archival data on the movement of the rural population of the Tatar Autonomous Soviet Socialist Republic during the XI Five-Year Plan]". Архонт. 8 (5): 58–67.
- Kirillova, O.K. (2015). "Problemy razvitiya malogo biznesa v Respublike Tatarstan na primere Aksubaevskogo munitcipalnogo rayona [Problems of small business development in the Republic of Tatarstan on the example of Aksubaevsky municipal district]". Ekonomika I Upravlenie V XXI Veke: Tendentcii Razvitiia (22): 168–172.
- Nurullin, A. (2010). "Monitoring sostoianiia zemelnogo fonda respubliki Tatarstan [Monitoring of the state of the land fund of the Republic of Tatarstan]". Uchenye Zapiski Kazanskoi Gosudarstvennoi Akademii Veterinarnoi Meditciny Im. N.E. Baumana. 202.
- Saushkin, G.A. (2002). "Razvedka bitumnykh zalezhei v protcesse bureniia glubokikh skvazhin [Exploration of bituminous deposits while drilling deep wells]". Georesursy. 12 (4).
- Steponova, I.M.; Mikhaylova, V.M. (2014). Puteshestvie po rodnomu kraiu. Istorii dereven, sel i poselkov Aksubaevskogo raiona Respubliki Tatarstan [Travel to the native land. History of villages, villages and settlements of Aksubaevsky district of the Republic of Tatarstan]. Cheboksary: Novoye Vremya. Archived from the original on April 7, 2018.
