= Shentalinsky District =

Shentalinsky District Шенталинский район (Russian)
- District
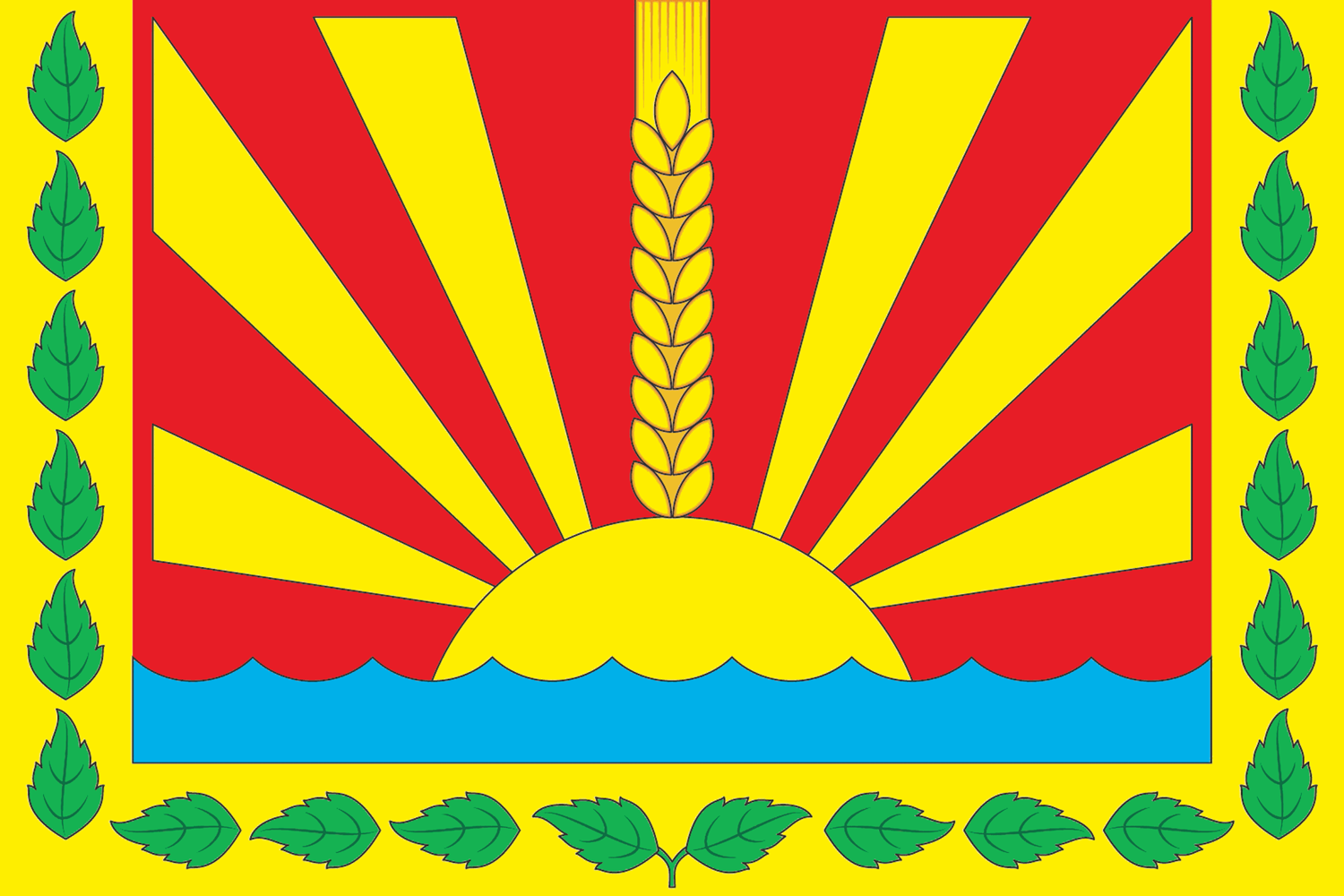
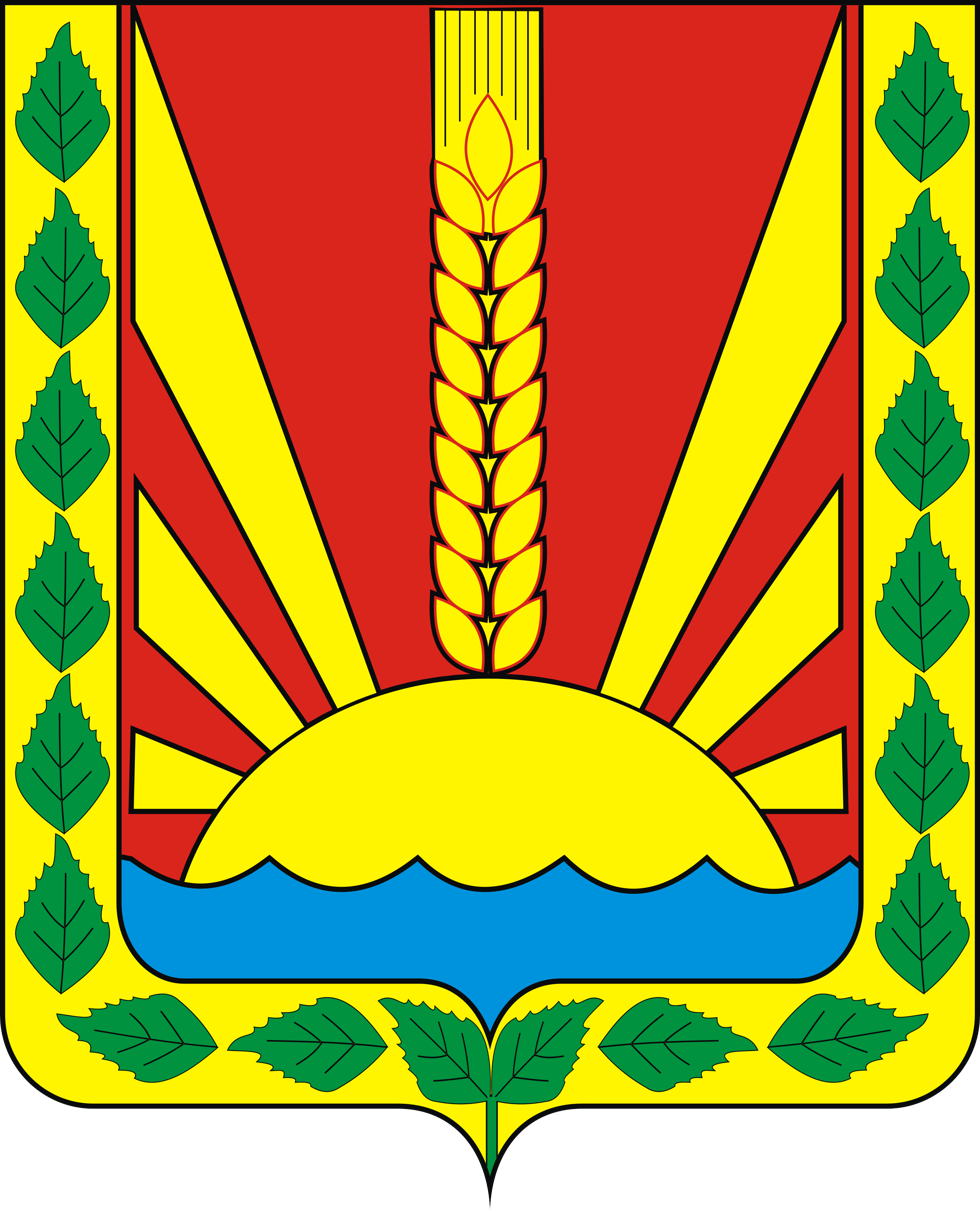
- Flag Coat of arms
- Location of Shentalinsky District in Samara Oblast
- Coordinates: 54°26′N 51°28′E
- Country: Russia
- Federal subject: Samara Oblast
- Established: 25 January 1935
- Administrative center: Shentala

Area
  - Total: 1,338.2 km^{2} (516.7 sq mi)

Population (2010 Census)
  - Total: 16,656
  - Density: 12.447/km^{2} (32.236/sq mi)
  - Urban: 0%
  - Rural: 100%

Administrative structure
  - Inhabited localities: 59 rural localities

Municipal structure
  - Municipally incorporated as: Shentalinsky Municipal District
  - Municipal divisions: 0 urban settlements, 10 rural settlements
- Time zone: UTC+4 (MSK+1)
- OKTMO ID: 36648000
- Website: http://shentala.su/

Shentalinsky District (Russian: Шентали́нский райо́н) is an administrative and municipal district (raion), one of the twenty-seven in Samara Oblast, Russia. It is located in the northeast of the oblast. The area of the district is 1,338.2 square kilometers (516.7 sq mi). Its administrative center is the rural locality (a railway station) of Shentala. Population: 16,656 (2010 Census); 18,288 (2002 Census); 20,079 (1989 Soviet census). The population of Shentala accounts for 39.7% of the district's total population.
