= Aksubayevo =

Place in Tatarstan, Russia

Aksubayevo Аксубаево
- Urban-type settlement

Other transcription(s)
  - Tatar: Аксубай
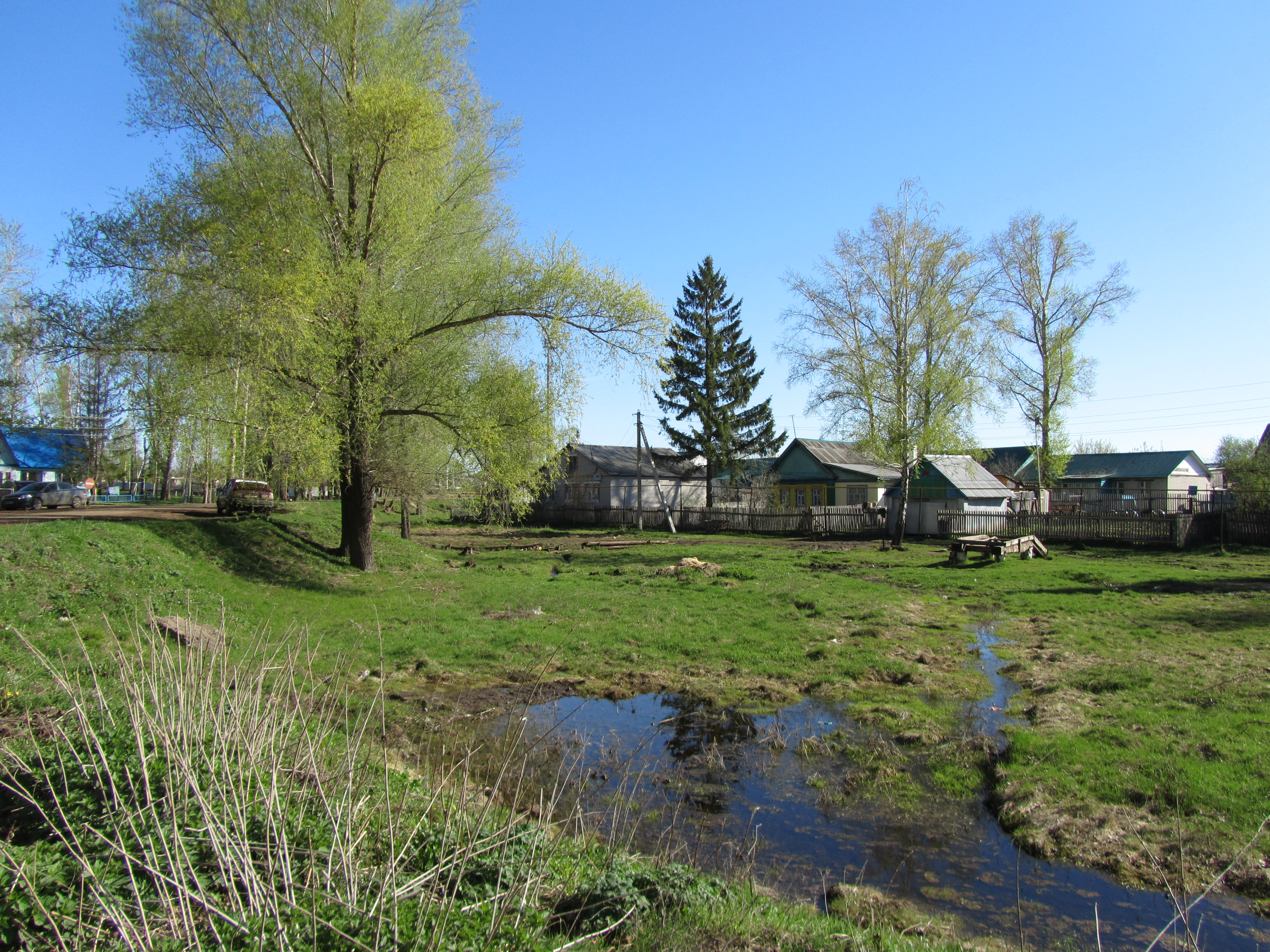
- Interactive map of Aksubayevo
- Location of Aksubayevo Aksubayevo (Tatarstan)
- Coordinates: 54°51′N 50°49′E
- Country: Russia
- Federal subject: Tatarstan
- Administrative district: Aksubayevsky District
- Founded: 1771
- Urban-type settlement status since: 1973
- Elevation: 50 m (160 ft)

Population (2010 Census)
  - Total: 10,008
  - Estimate (2021): 9,242 (−7.7%)

Administrative status
  - Capital of: Aksubayevsky District

Municipal status
  - Municipal district: Aksubayevsky Municipal District
  - Urban settlement: Aksubayevo Urban Settlement
  - Capital of: Aksubayevsky Municipal District, Aksubayevo Urban Settlement
- Time zone: UTC+3 (MSK)
- Postal codes: 423060, 423089
- OKTMO ID: 92604151051

Aksubayevo population
- 2010 Census: 10,008
- 2002 Census: 9,519
- 1989 Census: 7,601
- 1979 Census: 6,172

Aksubayevo (Russian: Аксуба́ево; Tatar: Аксубай) is an urban locality (an urban-type settlement) and the administrative center of Aksubayevsky District in the Republic of Tatarstan, Russia, located on the banks of the Malaya Sulcha River, 150 kilometers (93 mi) southeast of the republic's capital of Kazan. As of the 2010 Census, its population was 10,008.

== Administrative and municipal status ==
Within the framework of administrative divisions, the urban-type settlement of Aksubayevo serves as the administrative center of Aksubayevsky District, of which it is a part. As a municipal division, Aksubayevo is incorporated within Aksubayevsky Municipal District as Aksubayevo Urban Settlement.

== Transportation ==
The distance to the nearest railway station (in Nurlat) is 58 kilometers (36 mi).
