= Nizhnyaya Maktama =

Nizhnyaya Maktama Нижняя Мактама
- Urban-type settlement
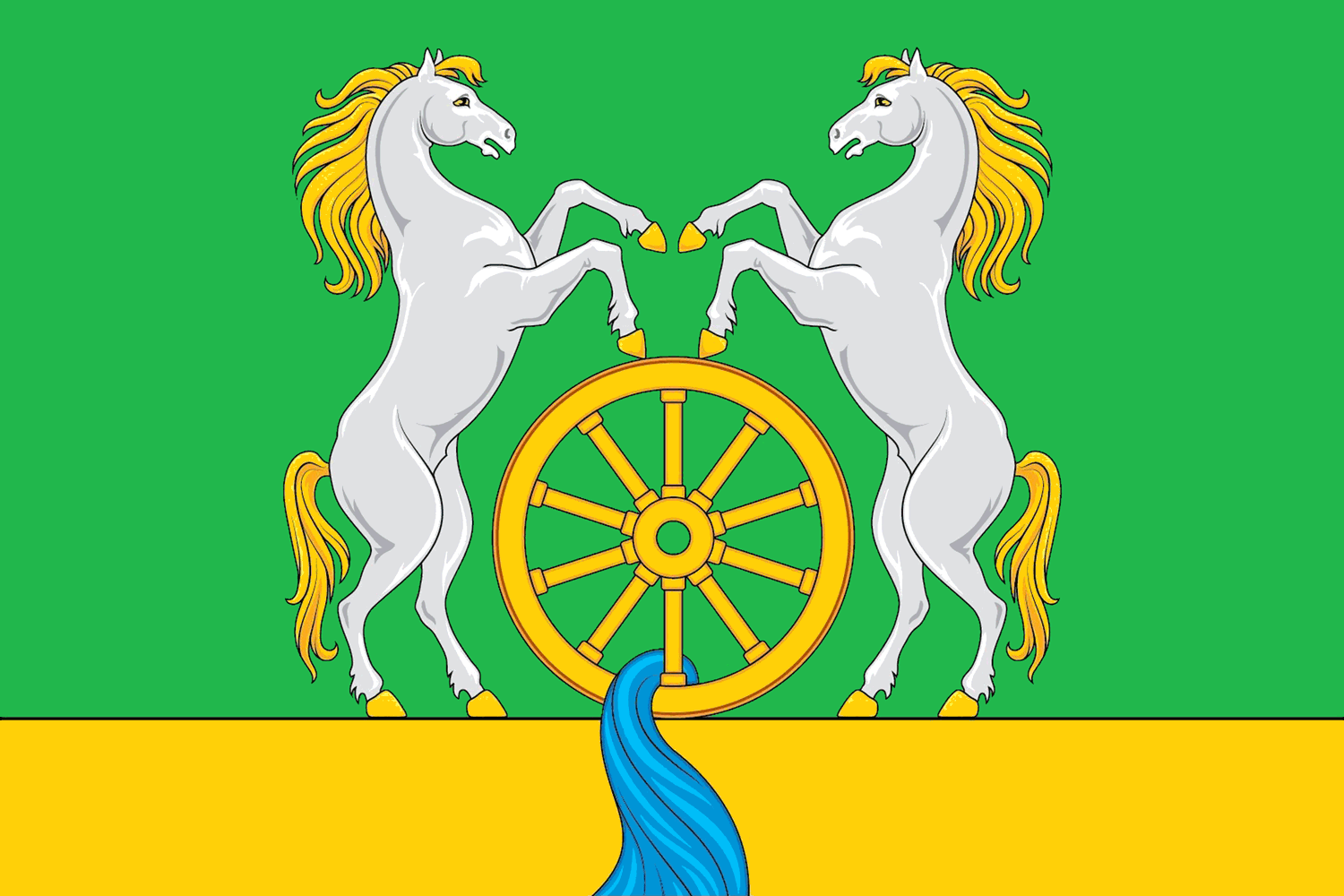
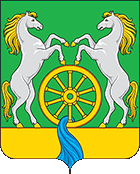
- Flag Coat of arms
- Interactive map of Nizhnyaya Maktama
- Location of Nizhnyaya Maktama Nizhnyaya Maktama (Tatarstan)
- Coordinates: 54°52′N 52°27′E
- Country: Russia
- Federal subject: Tatarstan
- Administrative district: Almetyevsky District
- Urban-type settlement status since: 1966

Population (2010 Census)
  - Total: 9,924
  - Estimate (2021): 9,695 (−2.3%)

Municipal status
  - Municipal district: Almetyevsky Municipal District
  - Urban settlement: Nizhnyaya Maktama Urban Settlement
  - Capital of: Nizhnyaya Maktama Urban Settlement
- Time zone: UTC+3 (MSK)
- Postal code: 423440
- OKTMO ID: 92608105051

Nizhnyaya Maktama population
- 2010 Census: 9,924
- 2002 Census: 10,580
- 1989 Census: 7,415
- 1979 Census: 6,366

Nizhnyaya Maktama (Russian: Ни́жняя Мактама́; Tatar: Түбән Мактама) is an urban locality (an urban-type settlement) in Almetyevsky District of the Republic of Tatarstan, Russia. As of the 2010 Census, its population was 9,924.

== History ==
It was granted urban-type settlement status in 1966.

== Administrative and municipal status ==
Within the framework of administrative divisions, the urban-type settlement of Nizhnyaya Maktama is subordinated to Almetyevsky District. As a municipal division, Nizhnyaya Maktama, together with one rural locality (the selo of Tikhonovka), is incorporated within Almetyevsky Municipal District as Nizhnyaya Maktama Urban Settlement.
