= Azeyevo, Ryazan Oblast =

Azeyevo Азеево
- Rural locality

Other transcription(s)
  - tt: Əce or Әҗе
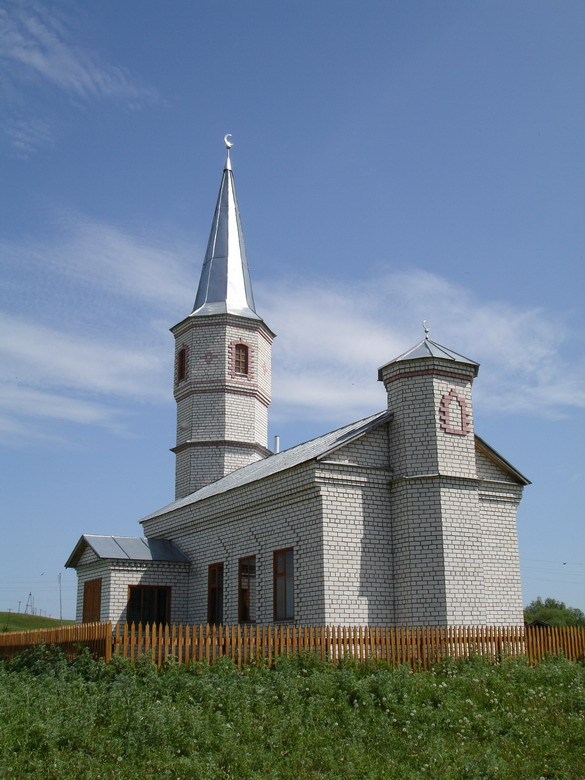
- A newly built mosque in Azeyevo
- Interactive map of Azeyevo
- Location of Azeyevo Azeyevo (Ryazan Oblast)
- Country: Russia
- Federal subject: Ryazan Oblast
- Administrative district: Yermishinsky District
- Elevation: 94 m (308 ft)

Population
  - Estimate (2023): 624 )
- Time zone: UTC+3 (MSK)
- Postal code: 391653
- OKTMO ID: 61602405101

Azeyevo (Russian: Азе́ево; Tatar: Əce or Әҗе) is a rural locality (a selo) in Yermishinsky District of Ryazan Oblast, Russia, located on the right bank of the Moksha River. Its population is about eight hundred people, mostly ethnic Tatars.

It was first mentioned in 1527.

The first mosque in Azeyevo was built around 1676. A new mosque was built in 2004.
