= Cheremshan River =

Cheremshan River may refer to:

- Bolshoy Cheremshan River
- Maly Cheremshan River
