= Shentala =

Rural locality in Samara Oblast, Russia

Coordinates: 54°26′00″N 51°27′52″E

Shentala (Russian: Шентала, German: Schöntal) is a rural locality (a railway station) and the administrative center of Shentalinsky District, Samara Oblast, Russia. Population: 6,613 (2010 census); 6,646 (2002 census); 6,181 (1989 Soviet census).
