= Sheshma =

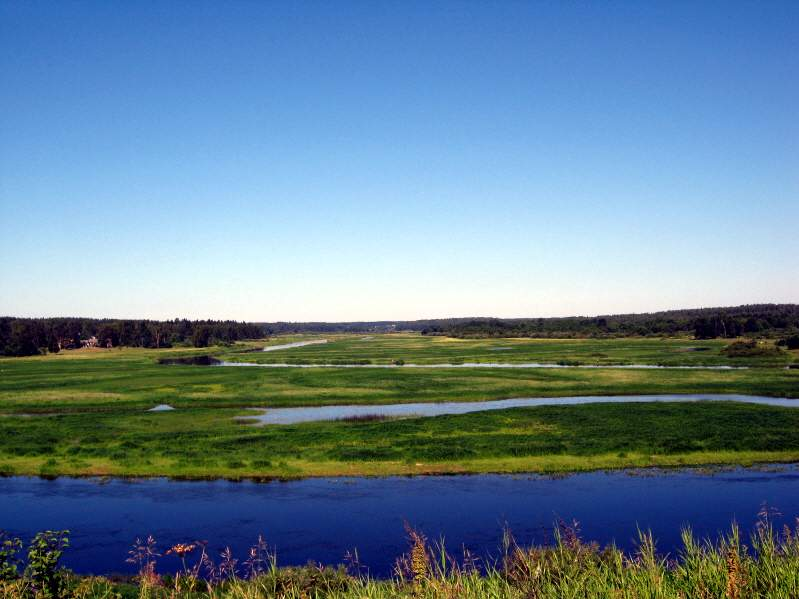

Location
- Country: Tatarstan and Samara Oblast, Russia

Physical characteristics
- Source
  - location: Samara Oblast
  - coordinates: 54°18′46″N 52°24′24″E
- Mouth: Kama
  - coordinates: 55.4614°N 51.0674°E
- Length: 259 km (161 mi)
- Basin size: 6,040 km^{2} (2,330 sq mi)

Basin features
- Progression: Kama→ Volga→ Caspian Sea

The Sheshma (Russian: Шешма; Tatar: Чишмә) is a river in Tatarstan and Samara Oblast, Russian Federation, a left tributary of the Kama, falling into the Kama near Starosheshminsk. It is 259 kilometres (161 mi) long, of which 227 kilometres (141 mi) are in Tatarstan, and its drainage basin covers 6,040 square kilometres (2,330 mi^{2}).

The river begins in Samara Oblast, 28 kilometres (17 mi) south of Leninogorsk, Tatarstan. Major tributaries are the Forest Sheshma, Kuvak, Sekines, Kichuy, and Talkysh rivers. The maximal mineralization is 600–700 mg/L. The average sediment deposition at the river mouth per year is 112 millimetres (4.4 in). The river generally is fed by underground water in the dry season. Drainage is regulated. There are major flood-plains in the middle and lower reaches of the Sheshma. Since 1978 it has been protected as a natural monument of Tatarstan. Shugurovo, Novosheshminsk and Starosheshminsk stay on the river.
