= Cheremshan, Cheremshansky District, Republic of Tatarstan =

Cheremshan Черемшан
- Selo
- Interactive map of Cheremshan
- Location of Cheremshan Cheremshan (Tatarstan)
- Coordinates: 54°39′00″N 51°30′21″E
- Country: Russia
- Federal subject: Tatarstan
- Administrative district: Cheremshansky District
- Founded: 1732

Population (2010 Census)
  - Total: 5,927
  - Estimate (2021): 6,439 (+8.6%)

Administrative status
  - Capital of: Cheremshansky District
- Time zone: UTC+3 (MSK)
- Postal code: 423100
- OKTMO ID: 92658470101

Cheremshan (Russian: Черемша́н; Tatar: Чирмешән) is a rural locality (a selo) and the administrative center of Cheremshansky District in the Republic of Tatarstan, Russia, located on the Bolshoy Cheremshan River. Population: 5,927 (2010 census); 5,635 (2002 census); 4,452 (1989 Soviet census).
