= Minnibayevo =

Minnibayevo Миннибаево
- Village
- Location within Bashkortostan Location within Russia
- Coordinates: 53°57′N 56°01′E
- Country: Russia
- Region: Bashkortostan
- District: Aurgazinsky District
- Time zone: UTC+5:00

Minnibayevo (Russian: Миннибаево; Bashkir: Миңнебай, Miñnebay) is a rural locality (a village) in Kebyachevsky Selsoviet, Aurgazinsky District, Bashkortostan, Russia. The population was 27 as of 2010. There is 1 street.

== Geography ==
Minnibayevo is located 16 km southeast of Tolbazy (the district's administrative centre) by road. Ibrayevo is the nearest rural locality.
