= Novosheshminsk =

Rural locality in Yaña Çişmä District, Tatarstan

Coordinates: 55°03′59″N 51°14′41″E

Novosheshminsk (Russian: Новошешминск; Tatar: Яңа Чишмә) is a rural locality (a selo) and the administrative center of Novosheshminsky District of the Republic of Tatarstan, Russia. Population: 4,561 (2010 census); 4,576 (2002 census); 3,478 (1989 Soviet census).
