= Central constituency (Tatarstan) =

Central single-member constituency
- Constituency of the Russian State Duma
- Deputy: Marat Nuriyev; United Russia
- Federal subject: Republic of Tatarstan
- Districts: Kazan (Aviastroitelny, Novo-Savinovsky, Sovetsky)
- Voters: 501,954 (2026)

The Central constituency (No.36 (Note: No.31 in 2016–2026)) is a Russian legislative constituency in Tatarstan. The constituency covers northern and western Kazan.

The constituency has been represented since 2021 by United Russia deputy Marat Nuriyev, housing and utilities businessman, who won the open seat, succeeding one-term United Russia incumbent Irshat Minkin.

== Boundaries ==
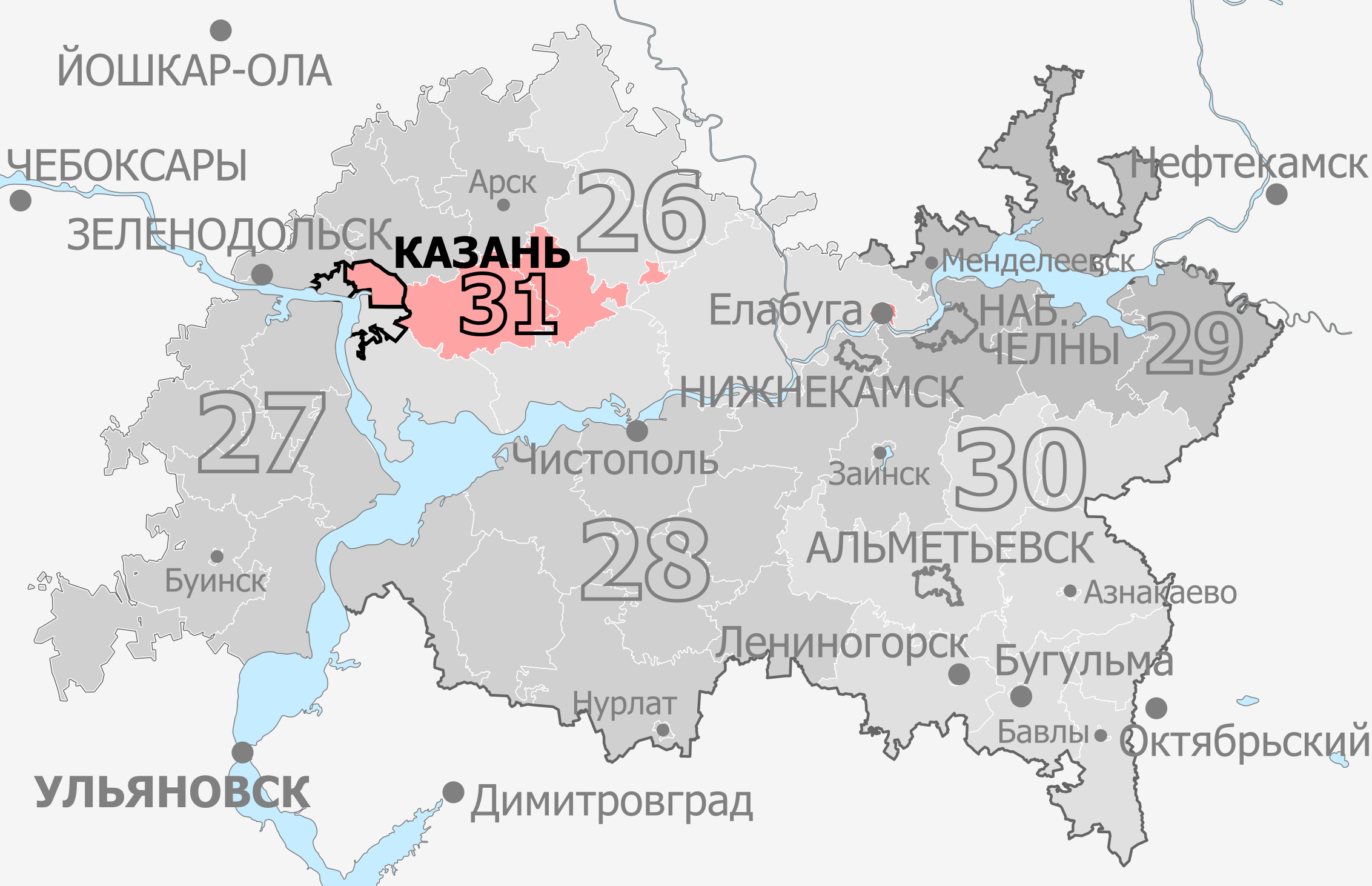
Constituency boundaries from 2016 to 2026

2016–2026: Kazan (Aviastroitelny, Novo-Savinovsky, Sovetsky), Pestrechinsky District, Tyulyachinsky District
The constituency was created during the 2015 redistricting from parts of former Moskovsky (Aviastroitelny city district of Kazan), Nizhnekamsk (Pestrechinsky District and Tyulyachinsky District) and Privolzhsky (Novo-Savinovsky and Sovetsky city districts) constituencies.

2026–present: Kazan (Aviastroitelny, Novo-Savinovsky, Sovetsky)
After the 2025 redistricting the constituency was significantly altered, losing Pestrechinsky and Tyulyachinsky districts to Privolzhsky constituency. In its new configuration the constituency is confined entirely within Kazan city limits.

== Members elected ==
Election	Member	Party
2016	Irshat Minkin	United Russia
2021	Marat Nuriyev	United Russia
2026	Marat Nuriyev	United Russia

== Election results ==
=== 2016 ===
==== Declared candidates ====
- Aigul Faizullina (A Just Russia), nonprofit executive
- Marsel Gabdrakhmanov (LDPR), former Member of Kazan City Duma (2014–2015), coordinator of the party regional office
- Maksim Krotov (Rodina), nonprofit chairman
- Irshat Minkin (United Russia), former First Deputy Mayor of Kazan (2010–2013), transportation executive
- Artem Prokofiev (CPRF), Member of State Council of the Republic of Tatarstan (2009–present)
- Alfred Valiyev (CPCR), businessman, perennial candidate
- Ruslan Zinatullin (Yabloko), party official

==== Failed to qualify ====
- Dmitry Berdnikov (Independent), nonprofit chairman, community activist, 2008 presidential candidate
- Ruslan Khaliullin (Independent), businessman

==== Declined ====
- Igor Bikeyev (United Russia), first prorector of Kazan Innovative Institute (lost the primary)
- Irina Volynets (United Russia), journalist, conservative activist (lost the primary, ran as A Just Russia candidate in the Chusovoy constituency)

==== Results ====
Summary of the 18 September 2016 Russian legislative election in the Central constituency
Candidate	Party	Votes	%
Irshat Minkin	United Russia	180,244	63.95%
Artem Prokofiev	Communist Party	30,597	10.86%
Alfred Valiyev	Communists of Russia	17,336	6.15%
Aigul Faizullina	A Just Russia	15,991	5.67%
Marsel Gabdrakhmanov	Liberal Democratic Party	15,108	5.36%
Ruslan Zinatullin	Yabloko	9,305	3.30%
Maksim Krotov	Rodina	9,037	3.21%
Total		281,866	100%

=== 2021 ===
==== Declared candidates ====
- Gulnaz Gizzatulina (New People), music teacher
- Milyausha Khismatullina (GP), marketing businesswoman
- Andrey Kuznetsov (RPPSS), law firm director
- Mikhail Kuznetsov (Party of Growth), Member of Kazan City Duma (2020–present), businessman
- Maksim Mukovnin (SR–ZP), party official
- Marat Nuriyev (United Russia), Member of State Council of the Republic of Tatarstan (2019–present), utilities businessman
- Artem Prokofiev (CPRF), Member of State Council of the Republic of Tatarstan (2009–present), 2016 candidate for this seat
- Vladimir Surchilov (LDPR), former Member of Narmonka Council (2015–2020), aide to State Duma member Yaroslav Nilov
- Alfred Valiyev (CPCR), Member of Kazan City Duma (2020–present), businessman, perennial candidate, 2016 candidate for this seat
- Ruslan Zinatullin (Yabloko), party official, 2016 candidate for this seat

==== Failed to qualify ====
- Azat Akhmetzyanov (Independent), unemployed

==== Declined ====
- Irshat Minkin (United Russia), incumbent Member of State Duma (2016–present)

==== Results ====
Summary of the 17-19 September 2021 Russian legislative election in the Central constituency
Candidate	Party	Votes	%
Marat Nuriyev	United Russia	195,454	56.93%
Artem Prokofiev	Communist Party	51,785	15.08%
Alfred Valiyev	Communists of Russia	23,445	6.83%
Vladimir Surchilov	Liberal Democratic Party	12,875	3.75%
Maksim Mukovnin	A Just Russia — For Truth	12,390	3.61%
Gulnaz Gizzatullina	New People	11,177	3.26%
Andrey Kuznetsov	Party of Pensioners	9,646	2.81%
Ruslan Zinatullin	Yabloko	8,040	2.34%
Mikhail Kuznetsov	Party of Growth	7,359	2.14%
Milyausha Khismatullina	Civic Platform	6,699	1.95%
Total		343,338	100%

=== 2026 ===
==== Declared candidates ====
- Vitaly Belousov (A Just Russia), Member of Kazan City Duma (2025–present), construction businessman
- Dinara Khalimdarova (CPRF), Member of Kazan City Duma (2019–present), aide to State Duma member Artem Prokofiev
- Marat Nuriyev (United Russia), incumbent Member of State Duma (2021–present)
- Rafael Shermatov (New People), Member of Koshkino Council (2025–present), lawyer
- Kirill Yevseyev (LDPR), Member of Oktyabrsky Council (2020–present), law firm partner
- Ruslan Zinatullin (Yabloko), chairman of the party regional office, 2016 and 2021 candidate for this seat

==== Declined ====
- Artem Prokofiev (CPRF), Member of State Duma (2021–present), 2016 and 2021 candidate for this seat (running on the party list)
- Ruslan Yusupov (LDPR), Member of State Council of the Republic of Tatarstan (2014–2019, 2024–present), transportation businessman, 2015 and 2025 head candidate (running in the Moskovsky constituency)

==== Results ====
Summary of the 18-20 September 2026 Russian legislative election in the Central constituency
Candidate	Party	Votes	%
Marat Nuriyev (incumbent)	United Russia	186,032	59.92%
Dinara Khalimdarova	Communist Party	43,852	14.12%
Vitaly Belousov	A Just Russia	30,957	9.97%
Rafael Shermatov	New People	20,481	6.60%
Kirill Yevseyev	Liberal Democratic Party	19,812	6.38%
Ruslan Zinatullin	Yabloko	6,827	2.20%
Total		310,465	100%
