= Älbädän =

Älbädän Әлбәдән
- derevnya
- Location within Tatarstan
- Country: Russia
- Region: Tatarstan
- District: Piträç District

Population (2012)
  - Total: 85
- Time zone: UTC+3:00

Älbädän (Tatar: Әлбәдән, romanized: Älbädän) is a rural locality (a derevnya) in Piträç District, Tatarstan. The population was 91 as of 2010. Älbädän is located 14 km from Piträç, district's administrative centre, and 53 km from Qazan, republic's capital, by road. The village already existed during the period of the Qazan Khanate. There are 4 streets in the village.
