= Arışxazda =

Arışxazda Арышхазда
- derevnya
- Location within Tatarstan
- Country: Russia
- Region: Tatarstan
- District: Piträç District

Population (2014)
  - Total: 196
- Time zone: UTC+3:00

Arışxazda (Tatar: Арышхазда, romanized: Arışxazda) is a rural locality (a derevnya) in Piträç District, Tatarstan. The population was 183 as of 2010. Arışxazda is located 13 km from Piträç, district's administrative centre, and 38 km from Qazan, republic's capital, by road. The village already existed during the period of the Qazan Khanate. There are 7 streets in the village.
