= Köyek, Pestrechinsky District =

Köyek Көек
- selo
- Location within Tatarstan
- Country: Russia
- Region: Tatarstan
- District: Piträç District

Population (2021)
  - Total: 15,977
- Time zone: UTC+3:00

Köyek (Tatar: Көек, romanized: Köyek) is a rural locality (a selo) in Piträç District, Tatarstan. The population was 9192 2020 as of 2020. Köyek, Pestrechinsky District is located 20 km from Piträç, district's administrative centre, and 19 km from Qazan, republic's capital, by road. The village already existed during the period of the Qazan Khanate. There are 48 streets in the village.
