= Yaña Şiğäli =

Yaña Şiğäli Яңа Шигали
- selo
- Location within Tatarstan
- Country: Russia
- Region: Tatarstan
- District: Piträç District

Population (2021)
  - Total: 7,685
- Time zone: UTC+3:00

Yaña Şiğäli (Tatar: Яңа Шигали, romanized: Yaña Şiğäli) is a rural locality (a selo) in Piträç District, Tatarstan. The population was 5869 (2020) as of 2010. Yaña Şiğäli is located 18 km from Piträç, district's administrative centre, and 24 km from Qazan, republic's capital, by road. The village was established in 18th century. There are 20 streets in the village.
