= Almetyevsk constituency =

Constituency of the State Duma of the Russian Federation

Almetyevsk single-member constituency
- Constituency of the Russian State Duma
- Deputy: Marsel Shaidullin; United Russia
- Federal subject: Republic of Tatarstan
- Districts: Almetyevsky, Aznakayevsky, Bavlinsky, Bugulminsky, Leninogorsky, Muslyumovsky, Sarmanovsky, Yutazinsky, Zainsky
- Voters: 438,514 (2026)

The Almetyevsk constituency (No.35 (Note: No.23 in 1993-1995 and in 2003-2007, No.22 in 1995-2003, No.30 in 2016–2026)) is a Russian legislative constituency in Tatarstan. The constituency covers south-eastern corner of Tatarstan.

The constituency has been represented since 2026 by United Russia deputy Marsel Shaidullin, former Head of Aznakayevsky District, who won the open seat, succeeding one-term United Russia incumbent Azat Yagafarov.

== Boundaries ==
1993–1995: Aksubayevsky District, Alkeyevsky District, Almetyevsk, Almetyevsky District, Aznakayevo, Aznakayevsky District, Bavlinsky District, Bugulma, Bugulminsky District, Cheremshansky District, Leninogorsk, Leninogorsky District, Muslyumovsky District, Novosheshminsky District, Oktyabrsky District, Sarmanovsky District, Spassky District, Yutazinsky District
The constituency covered the entirety of southern Tatarstan, including the towns of Almetyevsk, Aznakayevo, Bavly, Bugulma, Leninogorsk and Nurlat.

1995–2007: Aksubayevsky District, Alexeyevsky District, Alkeyevsky District, Almetyevsk, Almetyevsky District, Aznakayevo, Aznakayevsky District, Bavlinsky District, Bavly, Bugulma, Bugulminsky District, Cheremshansky District, Leninogorsk, Leninogorsky District, Muslyumovsky District, Novosheshminsky District, Nurlat, Nurlatsky District, Sarmanovsky District, Spassky District, Yutazinsky District
The constituency was slightly changed after the 1995 redistricting, gaining Alexeyevsky District from Nizhnekamsk constituency.

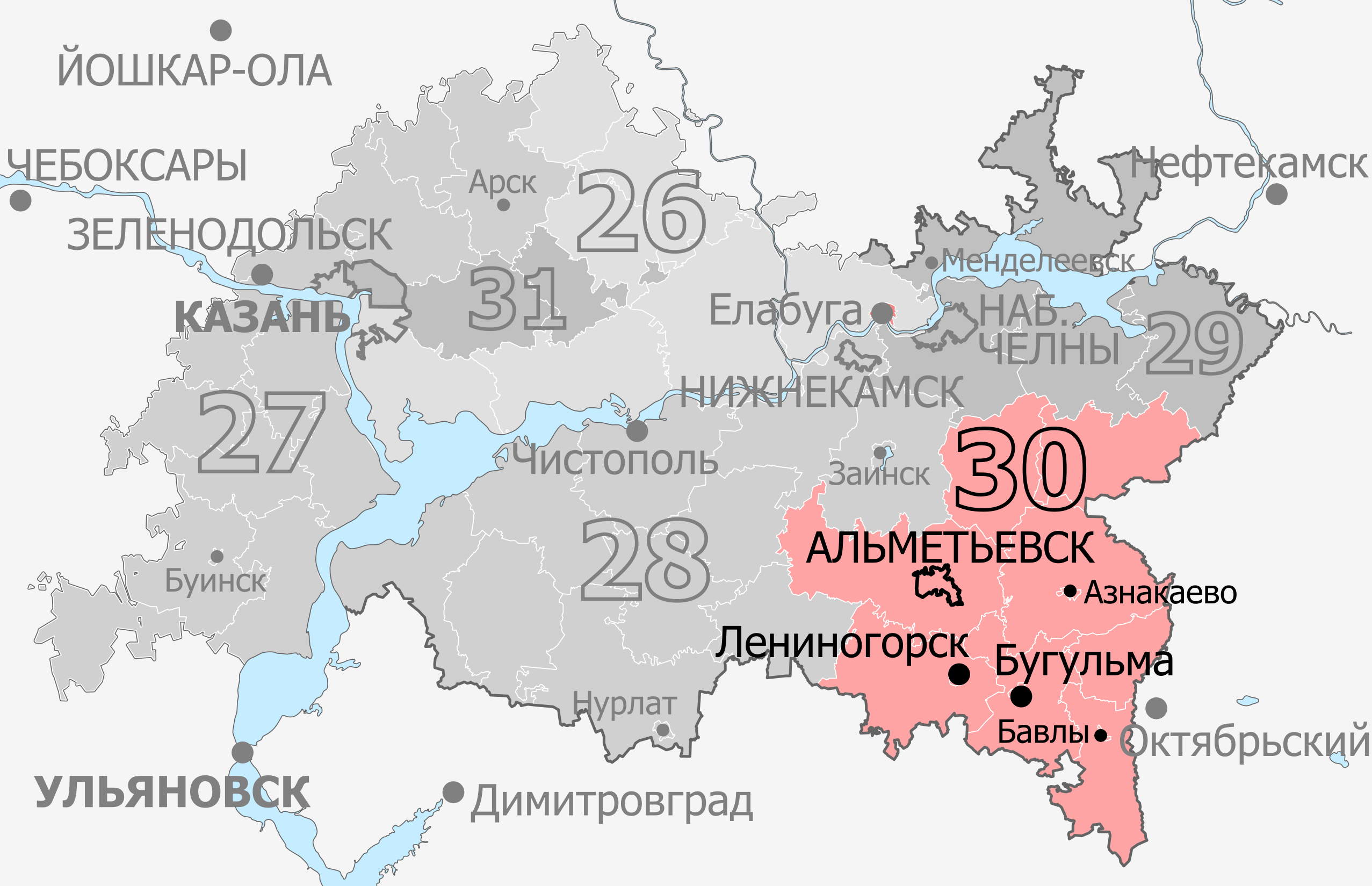
Constituency boundaries from 2016 to 2026

2016–2026: Almetyevsky District, Aznakayevsky District, Bavlinsky District, Bugulminsky District, Leninogorsky District, Muslyumovsky District, Sarmanovsky District, Yutazinsky District
The constituency was re-created for the 2016 election. This seat retained only oil-rich south-eastern corner of Tatarstan, losing its rural western half to Nizhnekamsk constituency.

2026–present: Almetyevsky District, Aznakayevsky District, Bavlinsky District, Bugulminsky District, Leninogorsky District, Muslyumovsky District, Sarmanovsky District, Yutazinsky District, Zainsky District
After the 2025 redistricting the constituency was slightly altered, gaining Zainsky District from Nizhnekamsk constituency.

== Members elected ==
Election	Member	Party
1993	Results were invalidated due to low turnout	
1994	Gennady Yegorov	Independent
1995	Azat Khamayev	Agrarian Party
1999	Fandas Safiullin	Fatherland – All Russia
2003	Marat Magdeyev	United Russia
2007	Proportional representation - no election by constituency	
2011	Proportional representation - no election by constituency	
2016	Rinat Khayrov	United Russia
2021	Azat Yagafarov	United Russia
2026	Marsel Shaidullin	United Russia

== Election results ==
=== 1993 ===
Election results were invalidated due to low turnout (9.56%). A by-election was scheduled for March 1994.

==== Declared candidates ====
- Nail Rakhmatullin (YaBL), banker
- Aleksandr Shtanin (Choice of Russia), radio electronics associate professor

==== Results ====
Summary of the 12 December 1993 Russian legislative election in the Almetyevsk constituency
Candidate	Party	Votes	%
Nail Rakhmatullin	Yablinsky–Boldyrev–Lukin	–	–
Aleksandr Shtanin	Choice of Russia	–	–
Total		51,212	100%

=== 1994 ===
==== Declared candidates ====
- Gennady Yegorov (Independent), Member of Supreme Council of Tatarstan (1990–present), Chairman of the Almetyevsk City Council of People's Deputies (1990–present)

==== Results ====
Summary of the 13 March 1994 by-election in the Almetyevsk constituency
Candidate	Party	Votes	%
Gennady Yegorov	Independent	–	73.9%

=== 1995 ===
==== Declared candidates ====
- Azat Khamayev (APR), mechanical plant director, nephew of President of Tatarstan Mintimer Shaimiyev
- Valery Luzgin (CPRF), philosophy professor

==== Withdrawn candidates ====
- Gennady Yegorov (NDR), incumbent Member of State Duma (1994–present)

==== Results ====
Summary of the 17 December 1995 Russian legislative election in the Almetyevsk constituency
Candidate	Party	Votes	%
Azat Khamayev	Agrarian Party	185,558	51.42%
Valery Luzgin	Communist Party	126,494	35.05%
against all		34,564	9.58%
Total		360,876	100%

=== 1999 ===
==== Declared candidates ====
- Sayedgali Abkadyrov (Independent), businessman
- Mansur Galiyev (CPRF), nonprofit chairman
- Ilgiz Gimatov (Independent), Member of State Council of the Republic of Tatarstan (1995–present), journalist
- Anas Nurutdinov (Independent), retired Border Service counter admiral
- Fandas Safiullin (OVR), Member of State Council of the Republic of Tatarstan (1995–present)

==== Failed to qualify ====
- Valery Alekseyev (DN), businessman
- Irek Avkhadiyev (RSP)
- Vladimir Boryushkin (LDPR), judo coach
- Anas Galiyev (PME)
- Siren Khisamiyev (Independent)
- Valery Luzgin (Russian Party), philosophy professor, 1995 CPRF candidate for this seat
- Rashid Saifutdinov (Independent)

==== Declined ====
- Azat Khamayev (Independent), incumbent Member of State Duma (1996–present)

==== Results ====
Summary of the 19 December 1999 Russian legislative election in the Almetyevsk constituency
Candidate	Party	Votes	%
Fandas Safiullin	Fatherland – All Russia	252,955	55.47%
Ilgiz Gimatov	Independent	58,630	12.86%
Mansur Galiyev	Communist Party	53,708	11.78%
Anas Nurutdinov	Independent	21,965	4.82%
Sayetgali Abkadyrov	Independent	9,873	2.17%
against all		47,729	10.47%
Total		455,997	100%

=== 2003 ===
==== Declared candidates ====
- Salimkhan Akhmetkhanov (NPRF), Member of State Duma (2000–present)
- Sergey Brusov (VR–ES), nonprofit chairman
- Rinat Gibadullin (LDPR), party coordinator in Kazan
- Rafael Idrisov (Independent), legal counsel
- Vladimir Kazakov (CPRF), nonprofit executive
- Marat Magdeyev (United Russia), Deputy Chairman of the State Council of the Republic of Tatarstan (2001–present), Member of the State Council (1999–present)
- Fandas Safiullin (Rodina), incumbent Member of State Duma (2000–present)
- Khikmatulla Safiullin (Independent), Member of Aznakayevo United Council of People's Deputies, labor safety engineer
- Almaz Shakirzyanov (KPE), driver
- Aleksandr Verentsov (PVR-RPZh), Member of Bugulma United Council of People's Deputies

==== Failed to qualify ====
- Sergey Nikitin (DPR), manager

==== Did not file ====
- Reshad Akhmetvaleyev (Independent), pensioner
- Timur Khalikov (Independent), community activist

==== Results ====
Summary of the 7 December 2003 Russian legislative election in the Almetyevsk constituency
Candidate	Party	Votes	%
Marat Magdeyev	United Russia	333,303	67.54%
Vladimir Kazakov	Communist Party	24,693	5.00%
Fandas Safiullin (incumbent)	Rodina	23,107	4.68%
Aleksandr Verentsov	Party of Russia's Rebirth-Russian Party of Life	21,478	4.35%
Sergey Brusov	Great Russia – Eurasian Union	20,401	4.13%
Salimkhan Akhmetkhanov	People's Party	12,098	2.45%
Khikmatulla Safiullin	Independent	7,845	1.59%
Rinat Gibadullin	Liberal Democratic Party	7,550	1.53%
against all		34,216	6.93%
Total		493,689	100%

=== 2016 ===
==== Declared candidates ====
- Aleksandr Agafonov (CPRF), Member of Almetyevsk City Council (2010–present), party secretary
- Valery Aleynikov (LDPR), individual entrepreneur
- Airat Khanipov (Rodina), insurance agent
- Rinat Khayrov (United Russia), Member of State Duma (2011–present)
- Marat Kurbanov (Yabloko), chairman of the Almetyevsk party office
- Zakary Mingazov (A Just Russia), former Member of Yelabuga City Council (2010–2015), production base chief
- Eduard Mukhametshin (CPCR), former Member of Bugulma City Council (2012–2015), oil executive, perennial candidate

==== Results ====
Summary of the 18 September 2016 Russian legislative election in the Almetyevsk constituency
Candidate	Party	Votes	%
Rinat Khayrov	United Russia	307,016	79.19%
Aleksandr Agafonov	Communist Party	29,121	7.51%
Valery Aleynikov	Liberal Democratic Party	12,563	3.24%
Eduard Mukhametshin	Communists of Russia	10,635	2.74%
Zakary Mingazov	A Just Russia	10,306	2.66%
Marat Kurbanov	Yabloko	9,881	2.55%
Airat Khanipov	Rodina	5,759	1.49%
Total		387,689	100%

=== 2021 ===
==== Declared candidates ====
- Oleg Buyantsev (Party of Growth), Member of Almetyevsky District Council (2020–present), construction materials businessman
- Roza Gainutdinova (New People), secretary of the party regional office
- Renat Galimzyanov (CPCR), Member of Almetyevsky District Council (2020–present)
- Andrey Lukin (Yabloko), Member of Nizhnyaya Maktama Council (2020–present), individual entrepreneur
- Aleksey Semenikhin (CPRF), Member of Almetyevsk City Council (2015–present), oil businessman
- Sergey Sitko (RPPSS), KAPO executive
- Sergey Sudykin (SR–ZP), Member of Bugulma City Council (2020–present), oil lab head
- Adel Vakhitov (LDPR), Member of Almetyevsk City Council (2020–present), transportation executive
- Azat Yagafarov (United Russia), Tatneft executive

==== Failed to qualify ====
- Kirill Minyayev (Independent), Member of Spasskoye Council (2020–present), bread factory director
- Ilgiz Rayanov (Independent), oil worker
- Ramil Zakirov (Independent), Member of Almetyevsky District Council (2015–present), children centre director

==== Declined ====
- Rinat Khayrov (United Russia), incumbent Member of State Duma (2011–present)
- Ravil Khusnulin (United Russia), Member of State Duma (2016–present) (lost the primary)

==== Results ====
Summary of the 17-19 September 2021 Russian legislative election in the Almetyevsk constituency
Candidate	Party	Votes	%
Azat Yagafarov	United Russia	252,025	69.77%
Aleksey Semenikhin	Communist Party	41,483	11.48%
Adel Vakhitov	Liberal Democratic Party	13,513	3.74%
Renat Galimzyanov	Communists of Russia	13,317	3.69%
Sergey Sudykin	A Just Russia — For Truth	10,727	2.97%
Roza Gainutdinova	New People	9,155	2.53%
Oleg Buyantsev	Party of Growth	6,194	1.71%
Andrey Lukin	Yabloko	5,952	1.65%
Sergey Sitko	Party of Pensioners	5,517	1.53%
Total		361,207	100%

=== 2026 ===
==== Declared candidates ====
- Ramil Akhmetvaliyev (CPRF), Member of Nuriner Council (2025–present), engineer
- Ramil Gabdulvaliyev (New People), Member of Pseyevo Council (2025–present), legal consultant
- Marsel Shaidullin (United Russia), Head of Aznakayevsky District (2012–present)
- Sergey Sudykin (A Just Russia), former Member of Bugulma City Council (2020–2025), oil preparation lab head, 2021 candidate for this seat
- Adel Vakhitov (LDPR), Member of Almetyevsk City Council (2020–present), municipal housing utilities executive, 2021 candidate for this seat

==== Declined ====
- Aleksey Semenikhin (CPRF), Member of Almetyevsk City Council (2015–present), water utilities executive, 2021 candidate for this seat
- Azat Yagafarov (United Russia), incumbent Member of State Duma (2021–present)

==== Results ====
Summary of the 18-20 September 2026 Russian legislative election in the Almetyevsk constituency
Candidate	Party	Votes	%
Marsel Shaidullin	United Russia	236,855	64.31%
Ramil Akhmetvaliyev	Communist Party	46,524	12.63%
Ramil Gabdulvaliyev	New People	29,901	8.12%
Sergey Sudykin	A Just Russia	25,842	7.02%
Adel Vakhitov	Liberal Democratic Party	25,820	7.01%
Total		368,288	100%
