= Moskovsky constituency =

Constituency of the State Duma of the Russian Federation

Moskovsky single-member constituency
- Constituency of the Russian State Duma

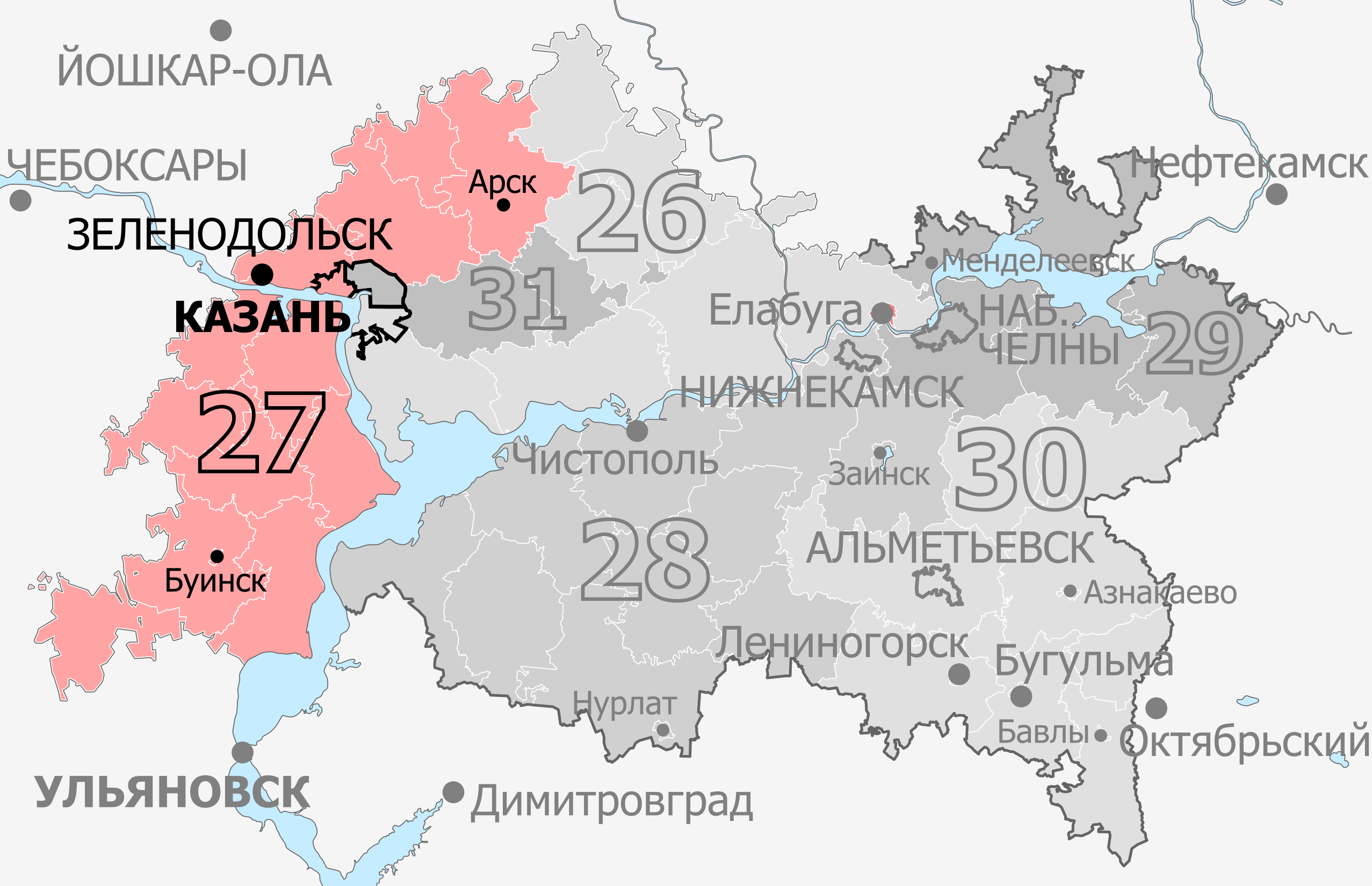
- Constituency boundaries since 2016
- Deputy: Ruslan Yusupov; Liberal Democratic Party
- Federal subject: Republic of Tatarstan
- Districts: Apastovsky, Arsky, Atninsky, Buinsky, Drozhzhanovsky, Kamsko-Ustyinsky, Kaybitsky, Kazan (Kirovsky, Moskovsky), Tetyushsky, Verkhneuslonsky, Vysokogorsky, Zelenodolsky
- Voters: 515,634 (2026)

The Moskovsky constituency (No.32 (Note: No.24 in 1993-1995 and in 2003-2007, No.23 in 1995-2003, No.27 in 2016–2026)) is a Russian legislative constituency in Tatarstan. The constituency covers western Kazan as well as the entirety of western Tatarstan.

The constituency has been represented since 2026 by Liberal Democratic deputy Ruslan Yusupov, former Member of State Council of the Republic of Tatarstan and transportation businessman, who won the open seat, succeeding five-term United Russia incumbent Ildar Gilmutdinov.

== Boundaries ==
1993–1995: Apastovsky District, Buinsky District, Drozhzhanovsky District, Kamsko-Ustyinsky District, Kaybitsky District, Kazan (Baumansky, Kirovsky, Moskovsky), Tetyushsky District, Verkhneuslonsky District, Vysokogorsky District, Zelenodolsky District
The constituency covered central and north-western half of Kazan as well as rural areas of western and south-western Tatarstan.

1995–2007: Apastovsky District, Buinsky District, Drozhzhanovsky District, Kamsko-Ustyinsky District, Kaybitsky District, Kazan (Aviastroitelny, Kirovsky, Moskovsky), Tetyushsky District, Verkhneuslonsky District, Zelenodolsk, Zelenodolsky District
The constituency was slightly changed after the 1995 redistricting, as it swapped former Baumansky city district of Kazan with Aviastroitelny city district from Privolzhsky constituency. The constituency also shedded Vysokogorsky District to Nizhnekamsk constituency.

2016–present: Apastovsky District, Arsky District, Atninsky District, Buinsky District, Drozhzhanovsky District, Kamsko-Ustyinsky District, Kaybitsky District, Kazan (Kirovsky, Moskovsky), Tetyushsky District, Verkhneuslonsky District, Vysokogorsky District, Zelenodolsky District
The constituency was re-created for the 2016 election. This seat retained almost all of its territory, losing only Aviastroitelny city district of Kazan to new Central constituency. Instead it gained northwestern Tatarstan (Arsky, Atninsky and Vysokogorsky districts) from the former Nizhnekamsk constituency.

== Members elected ==
Election	Member	Party
1993	Results were invalidated due to low turnout	
1994	Oleg Morozov	Independent
1995	Oleg Morozov	Independent
1999	Oleg Morozov	Fatherland – All Russia
2003	Rinat Gubaydullin	United Russia
2007	Proportional representation - no election by constituency	
2011	Proportional representation - no election by constituency	
2016	Ildar Gilmutdinov	United Russia
2021	Ildar Gilmutdinov	United Russia
2026	Ruslan Yusupov	Liberal Democratic Party

== Election results ==
=== 1993 ===
Election results were invalidated due to low turnout (18.57%). A by-election was scheduled for March 1994.

==== Declared candidates ====
- Rashit Akhmetov (DPR), co-chairman of the party regional office, journalist
- Vladimir Belyayev (Civic Union), former Member of State Council of Tatarstan (1991–1993)
- Midkhat Kurmanov (Independent), Member of Supreme Council of Tatarstan (1990–present)
- Yury Voronin (Independent), former First Deputy Chairman of the Supreme Soviet of Russia (1993), former People's Deputy of Russia (1990–1993)

==== Results ====
Summary of the 12 December 1993 Russian legislative election in the Privolzhsky constituency
Candidate	Party	Votes	%
Rashit Akhmetov	Democratic Party	–	–
Vladimir Belyayev	Civic Union	–	–
Midkhat Kurmanov	Independent	–	–
Yury Voronin	Independent	–	–
Total		96,342	100%

=== 1994 ===
==== Declared candidates ====
- Vladimir Belyayev (Independent), former Member of State Council of Tatarstan (1991–1993), 1993 candidate for this seat
- Fyodor Burlatsky (Independent), political scientist, journalist
- Oleg Morozov (Independent), former aide to Chief of Staff to the President of the Soviet Union Valery Boldin
- Yury Voronin (Independent), former First Deputy Chairman of the Supreme Soviet of Russia (1993), former People's Deputy of Russia (1990–1993), 1993 candidate for this seat

==== Results ====
Summary of the 13 March 1994 by-election in the Moskovsky constituency
Candidate	Party	Votes	%
Oleg Morozov	Independent	–	46.8%
Vladimir Belyayev	Independent	–	–
Fyodor Burlatsky	Independent	–	–
Yury Voronin	Independent	–	–

=== 1995 ===
==== Declared candidates ====
- Vladislav Achalov (Union of Patriots), former People's Deputy of Russia (1990–1993), retired Soviet Army colonel general
- Pyotr Chekmarev (CPRF), kolkhoz chairman
- Makhmut Gareyev (Interethnic Union), former Deputy Chief of the General Staff of the Soviet Armed Forces (1984–1989), retired Soviet Army General of the Army
- Islam Gilyazetdinov (People's Union), security guard
- Oleg Morozov (Independent), incumbent Member of State Duma (1994–present)
- Aleksey Mukhin (V–N!), military pensioner
- Ildus Sultanov (Yabloko), former Member of Supreme Council of Tatarstan (1990–1995)
- Vladimir Tolstopyatov (LDPR), party journalist

==== Results ====
Summary of the 17 December 1995 Russian legislative election in the Moskovsky constituency
Candidate	Party	Votes	%
Oleg Morozov (incumbent)	Independent	122,559	40.48%
Pyotr Chekmarev	Communist Party	59,660	19.71%
Ildus Sultanov	Yabloko	34,735	11.47%
Aleksey Mukhin	Power to the People	15,240	5.03%
Makhmut Gareyev	Interethnic Union	10,370	3.43%
Vladislav Achalov	Union of Patriots	9,363	3.09%
Vladimir Tolstopyatov	Liberal Democratic Party	8,688	2.87%
Islam Gilyazetdinov	People's Union	5,855	1.93%
against all		25,357	8.38%
Total		302,744	100%

=== 1999 ===
==== Declared candidates ====
- Marat Almukhametov (SPS), business consultant
- Vasily Almyashkin (NDR), Member of State Duma (1996–present)
- Ilsur Khusnutdinov (Independent), Member of State Council of the Republic of Tatarstan (1995–present)
- Valentin Klyuchnikov (RSP), industrial executive
- Oleg Morozov (OVR), incumbent Member of State Duma (1994–present), chairman of the Russian Regions faction (1997–present)
- Marsel Shamsutdinov (Yabloko), businessman
- Nasima Stolyarova (CPRF), Member of State Duma (1996–present)

==== Withdrawn candidates ====
- Farit Farisov (RPP), construction executive

==== Failed to qualify ====
- Gazhelya Shvets (ROS)

==== Did not file ====
- Anatoly Ageyev (LDPR)
- Vladimir Andreyev (Independent)
- Aleksandr Astrakhantsev (PME)
- Aleksandr Borisov (DN)
- Albert Burkhanov (Nikolayev–Fyodorov Bloc), archeology researcher
- Vazykh Kasimov (Independent)
- Faris Musin (Independent)
- Vladimir Rodionov (KTR–zSS), railroad worker

==== Results ====
Summary of the 19 December 1999 Russian legislative election in the Moskovsky constituency
Candidate	Party	Votes	%
Oleg Morozov (incumbent)	Fatherland – All Russia	158,464	45.23%
Vasily Almyashkin	Our Home – Russia	54,594	15.58%
Nasima Stolyarova	Communist Party	40,927	11.68%
Marat Almukhametov	Union of Right Forces	15,835	4.52%
Marsel Shamsutdinov	Yabloko	13,400	3.83%
Valentin Klyuchnikov	Russian Socialist Party	10,936	3.12%
Ilsur Khusnutdinov	Independent	7,442	2.12%
against all		32,187	9.19%
Total		350,318	100%

=== 2003 ===
==== Declared candidates ====
- Talgat Abdullin (Independent), businessman
- Olga Berdnikova (Independent), nonprofit executive
- Dmitry Bocharov (LDPR), massage therapist
- Fyodor Fomushkin (SPS), former Member of Kazan City Council of People's Deputies (1990–1995)
- Rinat Gubaydullin (United Russia), Member of State Council of the Republic of Tatarstan (1995–present), banker
- Dania Karimova (VR–ES), former Member of State Duma (1996–1999)
- Yury Korolev (PME), sports club chairman
- Rinat Mukhamadiyev (PVR-RPZh), writer
- Nasima Stolyarova (CPRF), former Member of State Duma (1996–1999), 1999 candidate for this seat

==== Withdrawn candidates ====
- Anatoly Perov (RP), pensioner
- Andrey Tatyanchikov (ORP Rus'), political consultant

==== Did not file ====
- Aleksandr Demin (Independent), postgraduate student
- Rashid Saifutdinov (Independent), unemployed
- Yerkezhan Sarsembayev (DPR), physical culture teacher
- Aleksandr Tyuleyev (KPR), consumers' union chairman
- Rif Zarifullin (RKRP-RPK), businessman

==== Declined ====
- Oleg Morozov (United Russia), incumbent Member of State Duma (1994–present), chairman of the Regions of Russia faction (1997–present) (ran in the Naberezhnye Chelny constituency)

==== Results ====
Summary of the 7 December 2003 Russian legislative election in the Moskovsky constituency
Candidate	Party	Votes	%
Rinat Gubaydullin	United Russia	194,548	52.68%
Nasima Stolyarova	Communist Party	31,462	8.52%
Rinat Mukhamadiyev	Party of Russia's Rebirth-Russian Party of Life	21,409	5.80%
Olga Berdnikova	Independent	14,884	4.03%
Talgat Abdullin	Independent	11,885	3.22%
Fyodor Fomushkin	Union of Right Forces	11,837	3.20%
Yury Korolev	Party of Peace and Unity	10,664	2.89%
Dmitry Bocharov	Liberal Democratic Party	10,365	2.81%
Dania Karimova	Great Russia – Eurasian Union	5,013	1.36%
against all		45,256	12.25%
Total		369,975	100%

=== 2016 ===
==== Declared candidates ====
- Ildar Gilmutdinov (United Russia), Member of State Duma (2003–present), Chairman of the Counting Commission (2011–present)
- Dmitry Karymov (CPCR), perennial candidate
- Andrey Kudryashov (LDPR), Member of Kuralovo Council (2015–present), deputy coordinator of the party regional office
- Lyudmila Kukoba (Rodina), film producer, screenwriter
- Khafiz Mirgalimov (CPRF), Member of State Council of the Republic of Tatarstan (2004–present), 2015 presidential candidate
- Rustam Ramazanov (A Just Russia), Member of Kazan City Duma (2015–present), construction businessman
- Marsel Shamsutdninov (PARNAS), businessman, 1993 Yabloko candidate for this seat

==== Failed to qualify ====
- Dmitry Berdnikov (Independent), nonprofit chairman, community activist, 2008 presidential election

==== Results ====
Summary of the 18 September 2016 Russian legislative election in the Moskovsky constituency
Candidate	Party	Votes	%
Ildar Gilmutdinov	United Russia	311,863	74.75%
Khafiz Mirgalimov	Communist Party	49,286	11.81%
Rustam Ramazanov	A Just Russia	16,324	3.91%
Andrey Kudryashov	Liberal Democratic Party	15,816	3.79%
Dmitry Karymov	Communists of Russia	8,710	2.09%
Lyudmila Kukoba	Rodina	6,108	1.46%
Marsel Shamsutdinov	People's Freedom Party	5,607	1.34%
Total		417,230	100%

=== 2021 ===
==== Declared candidates ====
- Ranis Akhmadullin (SR–ZP), civil and arbitration process senior lecturer, lawyer
- Stanislav Fyodorov (CPRF), Member of Almetyevsk City Council (2020–present), chief of staff to the party regional office
- Ildar Gilmutdinov (United Russia), incumbent Member of State Duma (2003–present), Chairman of the Counting Commission (2011–present)
- Rustam Riyanov (New People), tailor shop owner
- Robert Sadykov (CPCR), retired Soviet Army colonel, perennial candidate, 2001 presidential candidate
- Vadim Shumkov (RPPSS), businessman
- Kirill Yevseyev (LDPR), Member of Oktyabrsky Council (2020–present), law firm managing partner
- Elvira Zaytseva (Party of Growth), Member of Pimeri Council (2020–present), speech therapy centre owner

==== Withdrawn candidates ====
- Yelena Izotova (Yabloko), ecological activist (disqualified August 13, 2021)

==== Results ====
Summary of the 17-19 September 2021 Russian legislative election in the Moskovsky constituency
Candidate	Party	Votes	%
Ildar Gilmutdinov (incumbent)	United Russia	295,275	70.93%
Stanislav Fyodorov	Communist Party	36,221	8.70%
Ranis Akhmadullin	A Just Russia — For Truth	20,493	4.92%
Kirill Yevseyev	Liberal Democratic Party	17,066	4.10%
Robert Sadykov	Communists of Russia	15,917	3.82%
Rustam Riyanov	New People	10,194	2.45%
Elvira Zaytseva	Party of Growth	8,300	1.99%
Vadim Shumkov	Party of Pensioners	8,166	1.96%
Total		416,289	100%

=== 2026 ===
==== Declared candidates ====
- Olga Aiduganova (New People), Member of Spasskoye Council (2025–present), businesswoman
- Damir Khusnutdinov (A Just Russia), Member of Lenino-Kokushkino Council (2025–present), computer analyst
- Aleksandr Komissarov (CPRF), Member of State Council of the Republic of Tatarstan (2014–present), utilities businessman
- Renat Salakhov (Yabloko), electrician
- Ruslan Yusupov (LDPR), Member of State Council of the Republic of Tatarstan (2014–2019, 2024–present), transportation businessman, 2015 and 2025 head candidate

==== Did not file ====
- Pavel Kalashkin (Independent), rugby coach

==== Declined ====
- Ildar Gilmutdinov (United Russia), incumbent Member of State Duma (2003–present)
- Aleksey Grushin (United Russia), chemical technopark managing director (won the primary, declined to run)

==== Results ====
Summary of the 18-20 September 2026 Russian legislative election in the Moskovsky constituency
Candidate	Party	Votes	%
Ruslan Yusupov	Liberal Democratic Party	210,615	51.77%
Aleksandr Komissarov	Communist Party	74,647	18.35%
Olga Aiduganova	New People	52,940	13.01%
Damir Khusnutdinov	A Just Russia	35,812	8.80%
Renat Salakhov	Yabloko	28,823	7.08%
Total		406,821	100%
