= By-elections to the 1st Russian State Duma =

Bye Election in Russia

By-elections to the 1st Russian State Duma were held to fill vacant seats in the State Duma between the 1993 election and the 1995 election.

By-elections were held eight times. The last by-elections were held on May 28, 1995. After that, the by-elections were not held, as to the termination of the mandate of the State Duma had less than 9 months.

By-election	Date	Former MP	Party	Cause	Winner	Party	Retained
23. Almetyevsk	13 March 1994	None	None	Results of the general election declared invalid due to low turnout	Gennady Yegorov	Independent	n/a
24. Moskovsky	13 March 1994	None	None	Results of the general election declared invalid due to low turnout	Oleg Morozov	Independent	n/a
25. Naberezhnye Chelny	13 March 1994	None	None	Election was not held due to lack of registered candidates	Vladimir Altukhov	Independent	n/a
26. Nizhnekamsk	13 March 1994	None	None	Results of the general election declared invalid due to low turnout	Gabdulvakhit Bagautdinov	Independent	n/a
27. Privolzhsky	13 March 1994	None	None	Results of the general election declared invalid due to low turnout	Valentin Mikhailov	Independent	n/a
109. Mytischi	30 October 1994	Andrey Aizderdzis	Independent	Death (killed)	Sergei Mavrodi	Independent	Yes
107. Kolomna	14 May 1995	Sergey Skorochkin	Liberal Democratic Party	Death (killed)	Gherman Titov	Communist Party	No
164. Ordzhonikidzevsky	28 May 1995	Yury Brusnitsyn	Independent	Resigned	Vacant. By-election declared invalid due to low turnout.		No
