= Keräşen Särdäse =

Keräşen Särdäse Керәшен Сәрдәсе
- selo
- Location within Tatarstan
- Country: Russia
- Region: Tatarstan
- District: Piträç District
- Time zone: UTC+3:00

Keräşen Särdäse (Tatar: Керәшен Сәрдәсе, romanized: Keräşen Särdäse) is a rural locality (a selo) in Piträç District, Tatarstan. The population was 401 as of 2010. Keräşen Särdäse is located 22 km from Piträç, district's administrative centre, and 65 km from Qazan, republic's capital, by road. The earliest known record of the settlement dates from 16th century. There are 5 streets in the village.
