= Qawal =

Qawal Кавал
- selo
- Location within Tatarstan
- Country: Russia
- Region: Tatarstan
- District: Piträç District

Population (2014)
  - Total: 285
- Time zone: UTC+3:00

Qawal (Tatar: Кавал, romanized: Qawal) is a rural locality (a selo) in Piträç District, Tatarstan. The population was 278 as of 2010. Qawal is located 28 km from Piträç, district's administrative centre, and 65 km from Qazan, republic's capital, by road. The village already existed during the period of the Qazan Khanate. There are 8 streets in the village.
