= Kibäç =

Kibäç Кибәч
- selo
- Location within Tatarstan
- Country: Russia
- Region: Tatarstan
- District: Piträç District

Population (2017)
  - Total: 346
- Time zone: UTC+3:00

Kibäç (Tatar: Кибәч, romanized: Kibäç) is a rural locality (a selo) in Piträç District, Tatarstan. The population was 365 as of 2010. Kibäç is located 23 km from Piträç, district's administrative centre, and 67 km from Qazan, republic's capital, by road. The earliest known record of the settlement dates from 1565/1567. There are 8 streets in the village.
