= Nizhnekamsk constituency =

Constituency of the State Duma of the Russian Federation

Nizhnekamsk single-member constituency
- Constituency of the Russian State Duma
- Deputy: Oleg Morozov; United Russia
- Federal subject: Republic of Tatarstan
- Districts: Aksubayevsky, Alexeyevsky, Alkeyevsky, Cheremshansky, Chistopolsky, Mendeleyevsky, Nizhnekamsky, Novosheshminsky, Nurlatsky, Spassky, Yelabuzhsky
- Voters: 435,136 (2026)

The Nizhnekamsk constituency (No.33 (Note: No.26 in 1993-1995, 2003-2007, No.25 in 1995-1999, No.28 in 2016–2026)) is a Russian legislative constituency in Tatarstan. The constituency covers south-central Tatarstan, including the cities Chistopol, Nizhnekamsk and Yelabuga.

The constituency has been represented since 2020 by United Russia deputy Oleg Morozov, a nine-term State Duma member, former Deputy Chairman of the Duma and Senator, who succeeded Ayrat Khayrullin after his death in a helicopter crash. Morozov has chaired the Duma Committee on Control since October 2021.

== Boundaries ==
1993–1995: Alexeyevsky District, Arsky District, Atninsky District, Baltasinsky District, Chistopol, Chistopolsky District, Kukmorsky District, Laishevsky District, Mamadyshsky District, Nizhnekamsk, Nizhnekamsky District, Pestrechinsky District, Rybno-Slobodsky District, Sabinsky District, Tyulyachinsky District, Zainsk, Zainsky District
The constituency covered the towns of Chistopol, Nizhnekamsk and Zainsk and central Tatarstan as well as

1995–2007: Arsky District, Atninsky District, Baltasinsky District, Chistopol, Chistopolsky District, Kukmorsky District, Laishevsky District, Mamadyshsky District, Nizhnekamsk, Nizhnekamsky District, Pestrechinsky District, Rybno-Slobodsky District, Sabinsky District, Tyulyachinsky District, Vysokogorsky District, Zainsk, Zainsky District
The constituency was slightly changed after the 1995 redistricting, losing Alexeyevsky District to Almetyevsk constituency and gaining Vysokogorsky District from Moskovsky constituency.

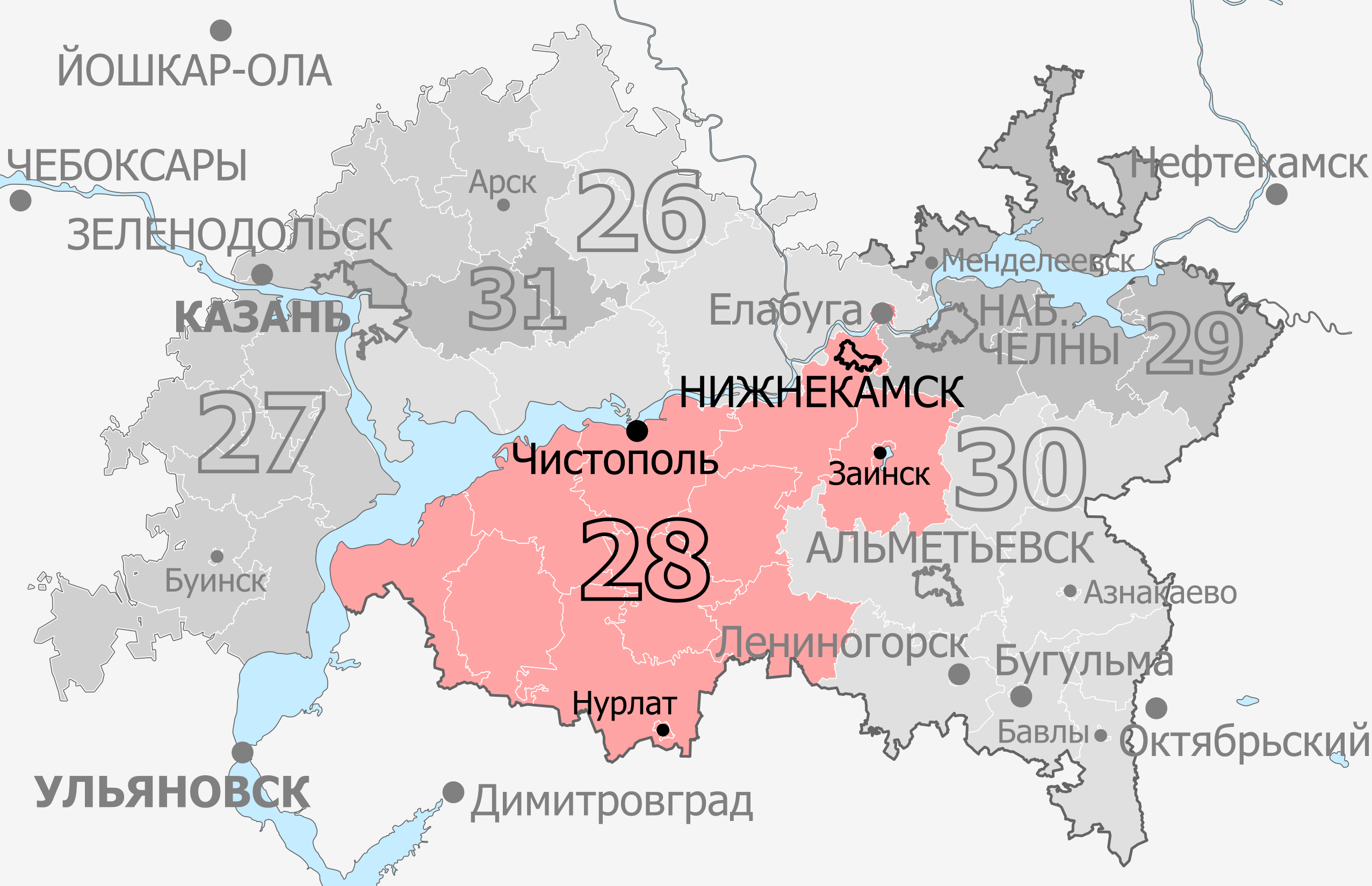
Constituency boundaries from 2016 to 2026

2016–2026: Aksubayevsky District, Alexeyevsky District, Alkeyevsky District, Cheremshansky District, Chistopolsky District, Nizhnekamsky District, Novosheshminsky District, Nurlatsky District, Spassky District, Zainsky District
The constituency was re-created for the 2016 election. This seat retained only Nizhnekamsk, Chistopol and Zainsk from its 1995–2007 configuration, losing the rest of its territory in north-central Tatarstan to Privolzhsky, Moskovsky and newly created Central constituencies. The constituency gained rural south-central Tatarstan on the left bank of the Kama river from the former Almetyevsk constituency.

2026–present: Aksubayevsky District, Alexeyevsky District, Alkeyevsky District, Cheremshansky District, Chistopolsky District, Mendeleyevsky District (Abalachi, Bryushli), Nizhnekamsky District, Novosheshminsky District, Nurlatsky District, Spassky District, Yelabuzhsky District, Zainsky District
After the 2025 redistricting the constituency was slightly altered, losing Zainsky District to Almetyevsk constituency. The constituency instead gained Yelabuzhsky District from Privolzhsky constituency and small part of Mendeleyevsky District from Naberezhnye Chelny constituency.

== Members elected ==
Election	Member	Party
1993	Results were invalidated due to low turnout	
1994	Gabdulvakhit Bagautdinov	Independent
1995	Gabdulvakhit Bagautdinov	Our Home – Russia
1999	Flyura Ziyatdinova	Fatherland – All Russia
2003	Albert Salikhov	United Russia
2007	Proportional representation - no election by constituency	
2011	Proportional representation - no election by constituency	
2016	Ayrat Khayrullin (Note: died in February 2020)	United Russia
2020	Oleg Morozov	United Russia
2021	Oleg Morozov	United Russia
2026	Oleg Morozov	United Russia

== Election results ==
=== 1993 ===
Election results were invalidated due to low turnout (8.93%). A by-election was scheduled for March 1994.

==== Declared candidates ====
- Damir Galyautdinov (Choice of Russia), Member of Kazan City Council of People's Deputies (1990–present)
- Vasily Kobyakov (Independent), Member of Supreme Council of Tatarstan (1990–present), experimental school principal

==== Results ====
Summary of the 12 December 1993 Russian legislative election in the Nizhnekamsk constituency
Candidate	Party	Votes	%
Damir Galyautdinov	Choice of Russia	–	–
Vasily Kobyakov	Independent	–	–
Total		45,236	100%

=== 1994 ===
==== Declared candidates ====
- Gabdulvakhit Bagautdinov (Independent), orphanage director

==== Results ====
Summary of the 13 March 1994 by-election in the Nizhnekamsk constituency
Candidate	Party	Votes	%
Gabdulvakhit Bagautdinov	Independent	–	69.1%

=== 1995 ===
==== Declared candidates ====
- Darwin Akhmetov (BN), construction executive
- Mikhail Atlasov (LDPR), businessman
- Gabdulvakhit Bagautdinov (NDR), incumbent Member of State Duma (1994–present)
- Aleksandr Karasev (Yabloko), human rights activist
- Nail Makhiyanov (BSG), former People's Deputy of Russia (1990–1993)
- Robert Sadykov (K–TR–zSS), retired Soviet Army colonel

==== Results ====
Summary of the 17 December 1995 Russian legislative election in the Nizhnekamsk constituency
Candidate	Party	Votes	%
Gabdulvakhit Bagautdinov (incumbent)	Our Home – Russia	143,422	38.44%
Robert Sadykov	Communists and Working Russia - for the Soviet Union	69,256	18.56%
Darvin Akhmetov	Bloc of Independents	34,444	9.23%
Aleksandr Karasev	Yabloko	33,711	9.03%
Nail Makhiyanov	Stanislav Govorukhin Bloc	29,710	7.96%
Mikhail Atlasov	Liberal Democratic Party	19,870	5.33%
against all		33,997	9.11%
Total		373,134	100%

=== 1999 ===
==== Declared candidates ====
- Georgy Gilmutdinov (Independent), businessman
- Dania Karimova (Independent), Member of State Duma (1996–present) (previously ran as Kedr candidate)
- Valery Makhmutov (Independent), unemployed
- Nikolay Maksimov (CPRF), industrial executive
- Rinat Mukhamadiyev (ROS), Member of State Council of the Republic of Tatarstan (1995–present)
- Yury Petrov (Russian Cause), unemployed
- Flyura Ziyatdinova (OVR), Deputy Director of the President of Tatarstan Department of External Relations (1997–present)

==== Withdrawn candidates ====
- Marat Salimov (Independent)

==== Failed to qualify ====
- Zaki Kharisov (Independent), businessman
- Veniamin Knyazev (PME)
- Vazira Ziyatdinova (Independent)

==== Did not file ====
- Oleg Agapov (RSP), sports coach
- Aleksandr Leushin (LDPR), attorney
- Yulia Vainshtok (DN)
- Andrey Yusupov (Independent)

==== Declined ====
- Gabdulvakhit Bagautdinov (NDR), incumbent Member of State Duma (1994–present) (ran on the party list)

==== Results ====
Summary of the 19 December 1999 Russian legislative election in the Nizhnekamsk constituency
Candidate	Party	Votes	%
Flyura Ziyatdinova	Fatherland – All Russia	229,612	49.78%
Nikolay Maksimov	Communist Party	63,180	13.70%
Yury Petrov	Russian Cause	35,374	7.67%
Dania Karimova	Independent	28,229	6.12%
Georgy Gilmutdinov	Independent	27,772	6.02%
Rinat Mukhamadiyev	Russian All-People's Union	19,161	4.15%
Valery Makhmutov	Independent	4,480	0.97%
against all		36,564	7.93%
Total		461,220	100%

=== 2003 ===
==== Declared candidates ====
- Yury Petrov (VR–ES), deputy chairman of the Russian Party of Peace regional office, 1999 Russian Cause candidate for this seat
- Robert Sadykov (CPRF), aide to State Duma member, 1995 K–TR–zSS candidate for this seat, 2001 presidential candidate
- Albert Salikhov (United Russia), head of the party regional executive committee
- Shamil Smirnov (SPS), Member of Chistopol United Council of People's Deputies, real estate executive
- Aleksandr Yakushev (Independent), 1972 and 1976 Olympic Champion ice hockey player

==== Withdrawn candidates ====
- Flyura Ziyatdinova (NPRF), incumbent Member of State Duma (2000–present)

==== Did not file ====
- Airat Gabdullin (IPR), journalist
- Ilshat Kuchumov (DPR), legal counsel
- Ilshat Nuriyev (RPP-PSS), meat-packing plant director
- Aleksandr Shelepov (ORP Rus'), chairman of the Arzamas self-government committee No.2

==== Results ====
Summary of the 7 December 2003 Russian legislative election in the Nizhnekamsk constituency
Candidate	Party	Votes	%
Albert Salikhov	United Russia	334,079	68.80%
Robert Sadykov	Communist Party	42,957	8.85%
Aleksandr Yakushev	Independent	25,837	5.32%
Yury Petrov	Great Russia – Eurasian Union	20,284	4.18%
Shamil Smirnov	Union of Right Forces	10,285	2.12%
against all		37,602	7.74%
Total		485,804	100%

=== 2016 ===
==== Declared candidates ====
- Anna Artemyeva (LDPR), lawyer
- Yevgeny Iosipov (CPCR), perennial candidate
- Airat Khairullin (United Russia), Member of State Duma (2003–present)
- Andrey Lukin (PARNAS), individual entrepreneur
- Damir Vildanov (A Just Russia), Member of Nizhnekamsk City Council (2010–present), attorney
- Albert Yagudin (CPRF), Member of Nizhnekamsk City Council (2010–present), businessman
- Rinat Zakirov (Independent), Member of Alkeyevsky District Council (2010–present), agriculture executive

==== Failed to qualify ====
- Oleg Bakanach (Rodina), nonprofit chairman

==== Results ====
Summary of the 18 September 2016 Russian legislative election in the Nizhnekamsk constituency
Candidate	Party	Votes	%
Airat Khairullin	United Russia	353,675	86.19%
Albert Yagudin	Communist Party	19,401	4.73%
Dmitry Vildanov	A Just Russia	12,799	3.12%
Anna Artemyeva	Liberal Democratic Party	8,054	1.96%
Yevgeny Iosipov	Communists of Russia	5,213	1.27%
Rinat Zakirov	Independent	4,805	1.17%
Andrey Lukin	People's Freedom Party	4,630	1.13%
Total		410,330	100%

=== 2020 ===
==== Declared candidates ====
- Nikolay Barsukov (CPCR), Member of Kirov City Duma (2017–present), 2017 Kirov Oblast gubernatorial candidate
- Vasily Kolosov (LDPR), nonprofit director
- Oleg Morozov (United Russia), Senator from Tatarstan (2015–present), former Member of State Duma (1994–2012)
- Ilnar Sirayev (A Just Russia), Member of Turayevo Council (2017–present), businessman
- Leonid Strazhnikov (CPSS), play zone administrator
- Albert Yagudin (CPRF), Member of Nizhnekamsk City Council (2010–present), businessman, 2016 candidate for this seat

==== Failed to qualify ====
- Vasily Korotkikh (Independent), IT specialist

==== Results ====
Summary of the 13 September 2020 by-election in the Nizhnekamsk constituency
Candidate	Party	Votes	%
Oleg Morozov	United Russia	279,450	73.42%
Albert Yagudin	Communist Party	35,536	9.34%
Ilnar Sirayev	A Just Russia	26,001	6.83%
Nikolay Barsukov	Communists of Russia	14,351	3.77%
Andrey Kolosov	Liberal Democratic Party	14,149	3.72%
Leonid Strazhnikov	Communist Party of Social Justice	8,736	2.30%
Total		380,616	100%

=== 2021 ===
==== Declared candidates ====
- Valery Aleynikov (LDPR), individual entrepreneur
- Dinar Ayupov (CPRF), Member of Bolshoye Afanasovo Council (2020–present), expert witness
- Roman Fedotov (Party of Growth), logistics businessman
- Andrey Geyko (Yabloko), individual entrepreneur
- Renat Khodzhayev (New People), marketing businessman
- Oleg Morozov (United Russia), incumbent Member of State Duma (1994–2012, 2020–present)
- Ilnar Sirayev (SR–ZP), Member of Nizhnekamsk City Council (2020–present), businessman, 2020 candidate for this seat
- Vitaly Smirnov (RPPSS), Member of Bolshiye Yaki Council (2020–present), chairman of the party regional office

==== Results ====
Summary of the 17-19 September 2021 Russian legislative election in the Nizhnekamsk constituency
Candidate	Party	Votes	%
Oleg Morozov (incumbent)	United Russia	276,061	72.45%
Dinar Ayupov	Communist Party	25,229	6.62%
Ilnar Sirayev	A Just Russia — For Truth	21,552	5.66%
Valery Aleynikov	Liberal Democratic Party	14,183	3.72%
Vitaly Smirnov	Party of Pensioners	11,375	2.99%
Andrey Geyko	Yabloko	10,040	2.63%
Roman Fedotov	Party of Growth	9,373	2.46%
Renat Khodzhayev	New People	9,217	2.42%
Total		381,041	100%

=== 2026 ===
==== Declared candidates ====
- Tatyana Berbeka (A Just Russia), party activist
- Airat Khabirov (LDPR), Member of Nizhnekamsk City Council (2025–present), municipal community centre director
- Bulat Khuziyev (CPRF), Member of Kayenly Council (2025–present), individual entrepreneur
- Oleg Morozov (United Russia), incumbent Member of State Duma (1994–2012, 2020–present), Chairman of the Duma Committee on Control (2021–present)
- Maksim Speransky (New People), Member of Nizhnekamsk City Council (2015–present), utilities executive

==== Declined ====
- Aidar Metshin (United Russia), Member of State Duma (2021–present) (running on the party list)
- Albert Yagudin (CPRF), Member of State Council of the Republic of Tatarstan (2021–present), 2016 and 2020 candidate for this seat

==== Results ====
Summary of the 18-20 September 2026 Russian legislative election in the Nizhnekamsk constituency
Candidate	Party	Votes	%
Oleg Morozov (incumbent)	United Russia	253,609	69.20%
Maksim Speransky	New People	39,395	10.75%
Bulat Khuziyev	Communist Party	32,442	8.85%
Airat Khabirov	Liberal Democratic Party	19,295	5.27%
Tatyana Berbeka	A Just Russia	17,771	4.85%
Total		366,469	100%
