= Kün =

Kün Күн
- selo
- Location within Tatarstan
- Country: Russia
- Region: Tatarstan
- District: Piträç District

Population (2012)
  - Total: 821
- Time zone: UTC+3:00

Kün (Tatar: Күн, romanized: Kün) is a rural locality (a selo) in Piträç District, Tatarstan. The population was 800 as of 2010. Kün is located 5 km from Piträç, district's administrative centre, and 47 km from Qazan, republic's capital, by road. The earliest known record of the settlement dates from 18th century. There are 9 streets in the village.
