= Kibäk İle =

Kibäk İle Кибәк Иле
- selo
- Location within Tatarstan
- Country: Russia
- Region: Tatarstan
- District: Piträç District

Population (2017)
  - Total: 229
- Time zone: UTC+3:00

Kibäk İle (Tatar: Кибәк Иле, romanized: Kibäk İle) is a rural locality (a selo) in Piträç District, Tatarstan. The population was 242 as of 2010. Kibäk İle is located 26 km from Piträç, district's administrative centre, and 57 km from Qazan, republic's capital, by road. The village already existed during the period of the Qazan Khanate. There are 7 streets in the village.
