= Tatar Qazısı =

Tatar Qazısı Татар Казысы
- selo
- Location within Tatarstan
- Country: Russia
- Region: Tatarstan
- District: Piträç District
- Time zone: UTC+3:00

Tatar Qazısı (Tatar: Татар Казысы, romanized: Tatar Qazısı) is a rural locality (a selo) in Piträç District, Tatarstan. The population was 495 as of 2010. Tatar Qazısı is located 30 km from Piträç, district's administrative centre, and 72 km from Qazan, republic's capital, by road. The earliest known record of the settlement dates from 1646. There are 8 streets in the village.
