= Ildar Gilmutdinov =

Russian politician (born 1962)

- Ильдар Гильмутдинов
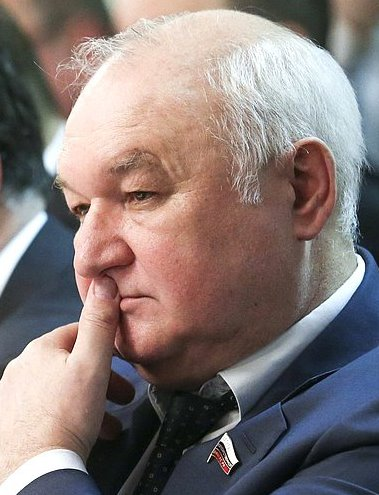
- Gilmutdinov in 2018

Member of the State Duma for Tatarstan
- Incumbent
- Assumed office 5 October 2016
- Preceded by: constituency re-established
- Constituency: Moskovsky (No. 27)

Personal details
- Born: September 3, 1962 (age 63) Klyancheevo, Kamsko-Ustyinsky District, Tatar ASSR, Russian SFSR, USSR

Ildar Irekovich Gilmutdinov (Russian: Ильдар Ирекович Гильмутдинов, Tatar: Илдар Ирек улы Гыйльметдинов, İldar İrek ulı Ğilmetdinov, born September 3, 1962, Kamsko-Ustyinsky District) is a deputy for the United Russia party in the 7th State Duma of the Russian Federation. He is the head of the committee for nationalities. Chairman of the Council of the Federal National and Cultural Autonomy of the Tatars (since 2007). Gilmutdinov received international sanctions in 2022 for his support of the Russian invasion of Ukraine.

== Memberships ==
- Council for interethnic relations under the President of the Russian Federation;
- Board of the Ministry of Sports of the Republic of Tatarstan.
- Board of the Ministry of Education and Science of the Republic of Tatarstan
- First Deputy Chairman of the Council of the Assembly of Peoples of Russia

== Education ==
Kazan State Pedagogical Institute, 1979-1983 - Physics.

Higher Komsomol School under the Central Committee of the All-Union Leninist Young Communist League, 1988-1989 - Higher political education

Federal State Institution of Higher Professional Education "North-Western Academy of Public Administration", 2007 - Manager, specialty "State and municipal management"

== Career ==
1982 - 1983 teacher of physics in a secondary special Music School at the Kazan State Conservatory.

1983 - 1984 director of the Bolshe-Burtasovskaya secondary school in the Kamsko-Ustyinsky district.

1984 - 1985 second secretary of the Kamsko-Ustyinsky district committee of the Komsomol.

1985 - 1986 service in the Soviet Army in the group of Soviet troops in Germany.

1986 - 1987 instructor of the department of working and rural youth of the Tatar OK Komsomol

1987 - 1990 first secretary of the Aktanysh district committee of the Komsomol

1990 - 1992 secretary of the Tatar OK Komsomol.

1992 - 2018 Chairman of the NGO "Council of Youth Organizations of the Republic of Tatarstan" on a voluntary basis.

1994 - 2001 Deputy Chairman of the State Committee of the Republic of Tatarstan for Children and Youth.

2001 - 2003 First Deputy Minister for Youth Affairs and Sports of the Republic of Tatarstan.

From 2003 to present c. - Deputy of the State Duma of the Federal Assembly of the Russian Federation:

- in the fourth convocation - Deputy Chairman of the Committee on Physical Culture, Sports and Youth Affairs;

- in the fifth convocation - Deputy Chairman of the Committee for Physical Culture and Sports;

- in the sixth convocation - a member of the Education Committee;

- in the seventh convocation - Chairman of the State Duma Committee on Nationalities.

=== Sanctions ===
He was sanctioned by the UK government in 2022 in relation to the Russo-Ukrainian War.

== Awards and recognition ==
- Medal of the Order "For Merit to the Fatherland", II degree (2012)
- medal "In memory of the 1000th anniversary of Kazan"
- Honored Worker of Youth Policy of the Russian Federation
- Honored Worker of Physical Culture of the Republic of Tatarstan
- Honorary Diploma of the Government of the Russian Federation
- Gratitude of the President of the Russian Federation (Decree of October 18, 2007) - for active participation in legislative activities
- Gratitude of the Chairman of the State Duma of the Federal Assembly of the Russian Federation.
