= Azat Yagafarov =

Russian politician

- Азат Ягафаров
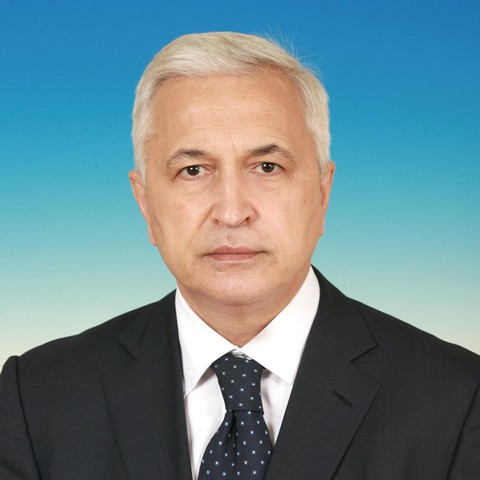
- official portrait, circa 2021

Member of the State Duma for Tatarstan
- Incumbent
- Assumed office 12 October 2021
- Preceded by: Rinat Khayrov
- Constituency: Almetyevsk (No. 30)

Personal details
- Born: 8 June 1961 (age 64) Sarles, Aznakayevsky District, Tatar ASSR, RSFSR, USSR
- Party: United Russia

Azat Ferdinandovich Yagafarov (Russian: Азат Фердинандович Ягафаров; born 4 April 1961, Sarles, Aznakayevsky District) is a Russian political figure and a deputy of the 8th State Duma.

From 1985 to 1988, he worked as an economist and as deputy head of the planning and economic department of the oil and gas production department Aktyubaneft. From 1990 to 1992, he was the leading engineer at the Tatneft. From 1992 to 1999, he was the head of the representative office in Moscow of the Tatneft association. In 2004, he started working as a Deputy General Director of Tatneft. Since September 2021, he has served as deputy of the 8th State Duma from the Tatarstan constituency.

== Sanctions ==
He was sanctioned by the UK government on 11 March 2022 in relation to the Russo-Ukrainian War.
