= Pimär =

Pimär Пимәр
- derevnya
- Location within Tatarstan
- Country: Russia
- Region: Tatarstan
- District: Piträç District
- Time zone: UTC+3:00

Pimär (Tatar: Пимәр, romanized: Pimär) is a rural locality (a derevnya) in Piträç District, Tatarstan. The population was 256 as of 2010. Pimär is located 15 km from Piträç, district's administrative centre, and 59 km from Qazan, republic's capital, by road. The village already existed during the period of the Qazan Khanate. There are 4 streets in the village.
