= Marat Nuriyev =

Russian politician

- Марат Нуриев
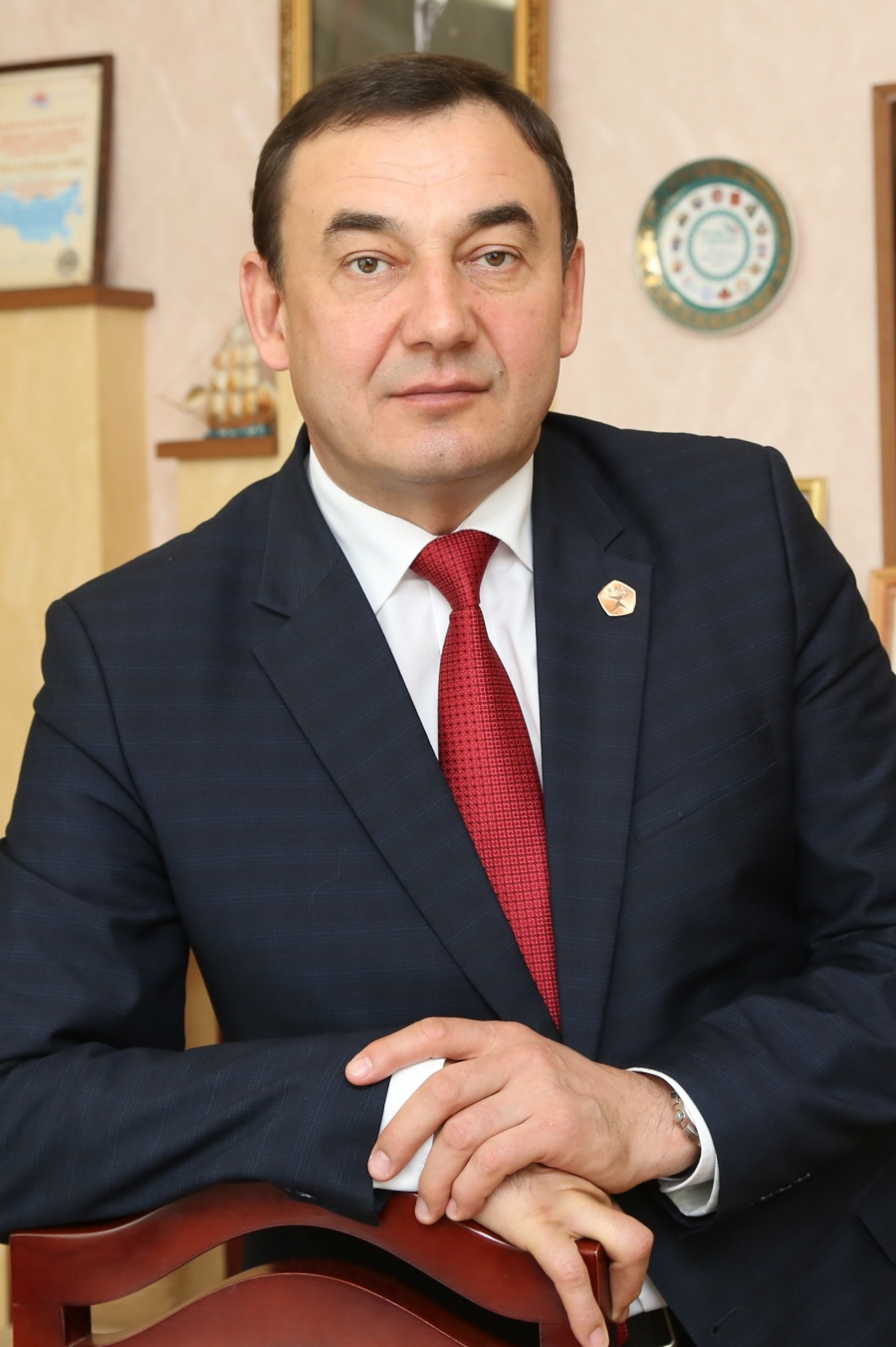

Member of the State Duma for Tatarstan
- Incumbent
- Assumed office 12 October 2021
- Preceded by: Irshat Minkin
- Constituency: Central Tatarstan (No. 31)

Personal details
- Born: 14 May 1966 (age 60) Shemyakovo, Apastovsky District, Tatar ASSR, RSFSR, USSR
- Party: United Russia
- Education: Kazan State University of Architecture and Civil Engineering

Marat Abdulkhaevich Nuriev (Russian: Марат Абдулхаевич Нуриев; born 14 May 1966 in Shemyakovo, Apastovsky District) is a Russian political figure and a deputy of the 8th State Duma.

Nuriyev joined the United Russia in 2002. From 2005 to 2012, he was the deputy of the Kazan City Duma of the 1st, 2nd, and 3rd convocations. In 2019-2021, Nuriev was the deputy of the State Council of the Republic of Tatarstan. He left the post in September 2021, as he was elected deputy of the 8th State Duma.

== Sanctions ==
In December 2022, the EU sanctioned Marat Nuriyev in relation to the 2022 Russian invasion of Ukraine.
