= Lenar Safin =

Russian politician (born 1969)

- Ленар Сафин
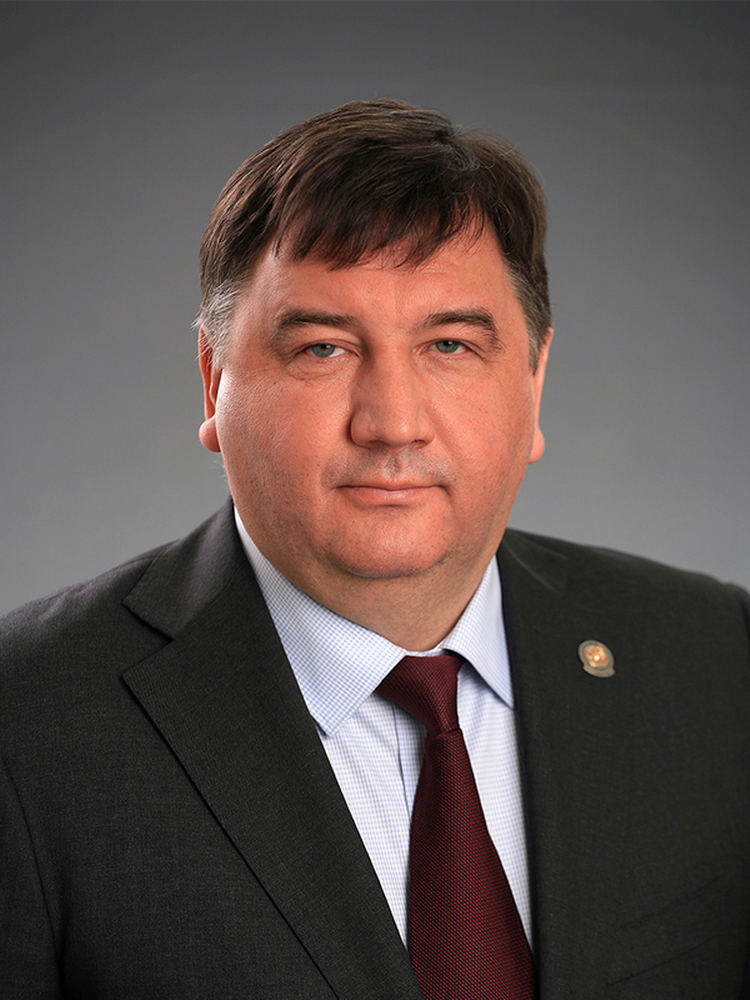
- Safin in 2018

Senator from Tatarstan
- In office 2020–2022
- Preceded by: Oleg Morozov
- Succeeded by: Alexander Terentyev

Personal details
- Born: Lenar Safin; 11 February 1969 (age 57) Arsk, Tatar Autonomous Soviet Socialist Republic, Soviet Union
- Party: United Russia
- Education: Kazan Federal University

Lenar Rinatovich Safin (Russian: Ленар Ринатович Сафин; born 11 February 1969) is a Russian politician. From 2020 to 2022, he served as a senator from Tatarstan.

== Career ==
Lenar Safin was born on 11 February 1969 in Arsk, Tatar Autonomous Soviet Socialist Republic. In 1993, he graduated from the Kazan Federal University. After graduation, Safin worked as an Assistant at the Department of History and Law. From 1995 to 1998, he served as a senior teacher of the Department of Criminal Law of Kazan State University. In 1998–2008, he was the associate professor of the Department of Criminal Law and Criminology. In 2010, he was appointed the Minister of Transport and Road Facilities of the Republic of Tatarstan. He left the position in 2020, to become the senator from Tatarstan. In 2022, he resigned to become the new rector of the Kazan Federal University.

== Sanctions ==
Lenar Safin is under personal sanctions introduced by the European Union, the United Kingdom, the USA, Canada, Switzerland, Australia, Ukraine, New Zealand, for ratifying the decisions of the "Treaty of Friendship, Cooperation and Mutual Assistance between the Russian Federation and the Donetsk People's Republic and between the Russian Federation and the Luhansk People's Republic" and providing political and economic support for Russia's annexation of Ukrainian territories.
