= Lenino-Kokushkino =

Rural locality in Piträç District, Tatarstan

Coordinates: 55°49′N 49°41′E

Lenino-Kokushkino (Russian: Ле́нино-Коку́шкино; Tatar: Ленино-Кокушкино) is a rural locality (a selo) in Pestrechinsky District of the Republic of Tatarstan, Russia, located on the Ushnya River in the Myosha's basin, 10 kilometers (6.2 mi) north of Pestretsy, the administrative center of the district. Population: 2,703 (2000 est.); 2,124 (1992 est.). In 1997, the population was 63% Volga Tatars and 34% Russians.

== History ==
It has been known since the Khanate of Kazan epoch as Yañasala (Tatar: Яңасала). In Russian, it has been known as Kokushkino (Russian: Кокушкино) until Lenin's death in 1924, when it was renamed Lenino (Ленино).

Lenin's family owned an estate here, which had been inherited from the family's maternal line (Blank family) and served as the family summer residence during Lenin's childhood and until his father's death. Lenin and his sister Anna also lived at the house in Kokushkino under a brief house-arrest, resulting from suspected involvement in his elder brother Alexander's revolutionary activity. The house where Lenin lived and spent his childhood summers mostly burned down in 1902, but the remaining part has been converted into a museum. In 1991, Lenino-Kokushkino Natural and Historical Reserve was established.

== Economy ==
The main occupations of the residents are agriculture, cattle breeding, and poultry farming. There is a bakery, secondary, musical, and vocational schools, and a mosque.
