= Artem Prokofiev =

Russian politician

Artem Prokofiev MP
- Артём Прокофьев

Member of the State Duma (Party List Seat)
- Incumbent
- Assumed office 12 October 2021

Personal details
- Born: 31 December 1983 (age 42) Kazan, Tatar ASSR, Russian SFSR, Soviet Union
- Party: Communist Party of the Russian Federation
- Education: Kazan State University; Kazan Innovation University

Artem Vyacheslavovich Prokofiev (Russian: Артём Вячеславович Прокофьев; born 31 December 1983, Kazan) is a Russian political figure and a deputy of the 8th State Duma.

From 2002 to 2004, Prokofiev worked as deputy chairman of the political club of students of Tatarstan under the league of students of the Republic of Tatarstan. From 2007 to 2009, he was an assistant to the deputy of the State Duma Oleg Kulikov. From 2009 to 2021, he was the deputy of the State Council of the Republic of Tatarstan of the 4th, 5th, and 6th convocations. From 2011 to 2014, he was an assistant to the deputy of the State Duma Viktor Peshkov. Since September 2021, he has served as deputy of the 8th State Duma.

== Sanctions ==
He was sanctioned by the UK government in 2022 in relation to the Russo-Ukrainian War.
