= Kulayevo =

Kulayevo Кулаево
- Village
- Location within Bashkortostan Location within Russia
- Coordinates: 55°46′N 55°12′E
- Country: Russia
- Region: Bashkortostan
- District: Burayevsky District
- Time zone: UTC+5:00

Kulayevo (Russian: Кулаево; Bashkir: Ҡолай, Qolay) is a rural locality (a village) in Kainlykovsky Selsoviet, Burayevsky District, Bashkortostan, Russia. The population was 374 as of 2010. There are 4 streets.

== Geography ==
Kulayevo is located 16 km southwest of Burayevo (the district's administrative centre) by road. Kushmanakovo is the nearest rural locality.
