= Kükşel =

Kükşel Күкшел
- selo
- Location within Tatarstan
- Country: Russia
- Region: Tatarstan
- District: Kukmara District
- Time zone: UTC+3:00

Kükşel (Tatar: Күкшел, romanized: Kükşel, Russian: Кошкино) is a rural locality (a selo) in Kukmara District, Tatarstan. The population was 876 as of 2010. Kükşel is located 22 km from Kukmаra, district's administrative centre, and 153 km from Ԛаzan, republic's capital, by road. The earliest known record of the settlement dates from 1678. There are 12 streets in the village.
