= Oleg Morozov (politician) =

Russian politician

- Олег Морозов
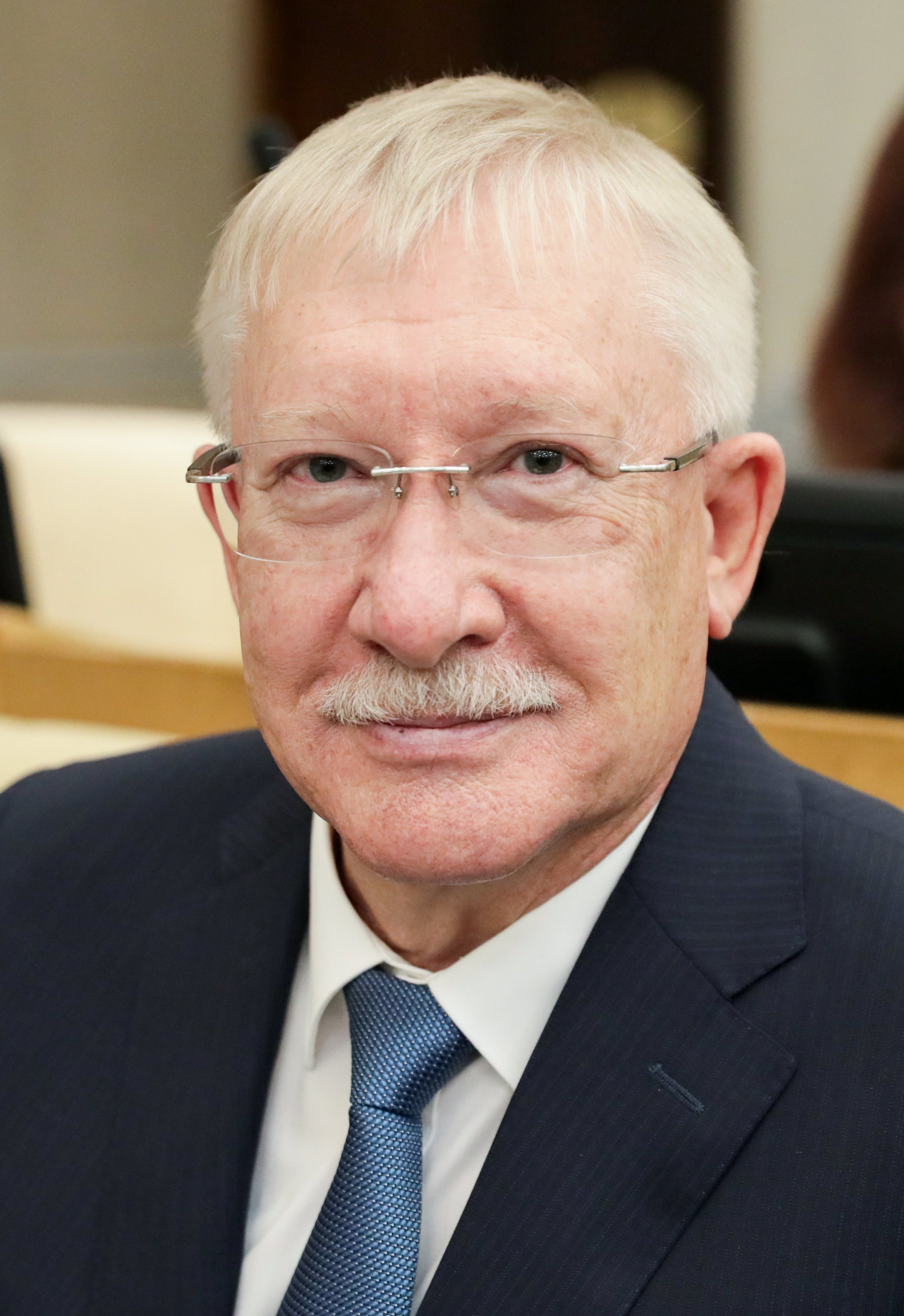
- Morozov in 2020

Member of the State Duma for Tatarstan
- Incumbent
- Assumed office 23 September 2020
- Preceded by: Airat Khairullin
- Constituency: Nizhnekamsk (No. 28)
- In office 6 April 1994 – 24 December 2007
- Preceded by: Constituency established
- Succeeded by: Constituencies Abolished
- Constituency: Moskovsky (No. 27) (1994–2003); Naberezhnye Chelny (No. 29) (2003–2007)

Chairman of the State Duma Control Committee
- Incumbent
- Assumed office 12 October 2021
- Preceded by: Position established; Olga Savastianova (Rules and Organization Committee)

Member of the State Duma (Party List Seat)
- In office 24 December 2007 – 6 June 2012

Russian Federation Senator from the Republic of Tatarstan
- In office 18 September 2015 – 18 September 2020
- Preceded by: Sergey Batin
- Succeeded by: Lenar Safin

Personal details
- Born: Oleg Viktorovich Morozov; 5 November 1953 (age 72) Kazan, Tatar ASSR, USSR
- Party: United Russia
- Spouse: Irina Boyarynya (div. 2015)
- Children: 2
- Parents: Victor Stepanivich Morozov (father); Ninella Georgievna (mother)
- Education: Vladimir Ilyich Ulyanov University, Kazan
- Occupation: Politician
- Oleg Morozov's voice Recorded 27 January 2011

Oleg Viktorovich Morozov (Russian: Олег Викторович Морозов; born 5 November 1953) is a Russian and former Soviet politician. Chairman of the State Duma committee on control from 12 October 2021.

== Biography ==
He has the federal state civilian service rank of 1st class Active State Councillor of the Russian Federation. He was a deputy in the State Duma between 1994 and 2012 and again since 2020. (Note: The bye-election in which Oleg Morozov was returned for the final year to the seventh Duma convocation was held in September 2020. It was triggered through the death in a helicopter accident earlier that year of Airat Khairullin.) He served as a member of the Federation Council between September 2015 and September 2020. From May 2012 till March 2015, he worked as head of the presidential office for domestic policy. He supports the United Russia party.

During the early 1980s, before entering mainstream politics, he was himself employed in the universities sector. He is fluent in German.

== Early years ==
Morozov was born in Kazan. His father, Victor Stepanivich Morozov, came originally from a farming community in Izmaylovo, a village in the Baryshsky District. Victor Stepanivich was a Red Army army veteran of the Great Patriotic War, which he survived with medals and the rank of colonel, despite being twice wounded. Ninella Georgievna, Morozov's mother, came originally from the Kursk region, but had studied in Kazan and was a graduate of "Vladimir Ilyich Ulyanov University" (as it was known after 1925 during the Soviet era). She worked throughout her life for the local Defence Industries Enterprise.

Morozov's parents were determined that the boy should go through the rest of his life equipped for "a real profession", and when, in 1971, the opportunity arose to move on to university his father urged him to obtain a practical degree, in a subject such as Engineering, Physics or Mathematics, but Morozov enrolled to study at the History-Philology faculty of the Kazan Federal University In 1976 Morozov graduated from the university with a so-called "red diploma" degree (indicating consistently high marks).

== Career ==
=== In University (1980–1984) ===
In 1980 Morozov was offered the position of a research assistant at the History-Philology faculty, a position which could be combined with study for a postgraduate degree. The offer carried a virtual guarantee of a university job once the higher level degree had been obtained, and was also financially attractive in its own terms. He accepted the offer and for the next few years, as a "pre-professor" ("доцентом"), combined his research and study with teaching students. In 1980 he successfully defended his doctoral dissertation with the title "critical analysis of West German interpretations of socialist internationalism in theory and in practice" ("Критический анализ западногерманских интерпретаций теории и практики социалистического интернационализма") and received his doctorate.

Also in 1980 he was sent to teach at the university department for "Scientific communism" ("Научный коммунизм"). At around the same time he was awarded a "Candidate of Philosophical Sciences" ("кандидат философских наук") degree, an interim higher-level degree marking a significant step along the path to a full university professorship.

During 1983–84 he undertook a one-year internship in the department for Political Sciences at the University of Bonn in West Germany. It was a highly unusual opportunity at the time: he appears to have been selected for it simply because he had been identified as "one of the department's most successful teachers". On his return to Kazan in 1984, he settled to progressing what seemed likely to be a stellar career at the university. There was an important dissertation to be completed. A year later Perestroika arrived and across the Soviet Union a lot of the old assumptions began to shift in all sorts of ways - and at a speed - that few would have anticipated until the Gorbachev changes suddenly began. In 1985 Morozov was elected to membership of the university party committee ("партком").

=== In Kazan Agitprop (1987–1989) ===
At around the same time, still only aged 29, Morozov was offered and accepted a university assistant-professorship in the department for "Scientific communism" ("Научный коммунизм"). Between 1985 and 1987 he served as a deputy secretary with the university party committee. Later, at 33, he became the chief of the regional department for agitation and propaganda. Between 1987 and 1989 he headed up the Tartar regional committee department for the CPSU nationally, a position he held concurrently with the regional Agitprop headship.

=== Central Committee Moscow (1989–1991) ===
In 1989 he accepted a new job, working now as an instructor at the Central Committee's Science and Education department. Working directly for the Party Central Committee was in many respects a significant promotion, but it meant relocating to Moscow: that meant leaving the city which he loved and in which he had lived all his life. It meant missing out on the company and support of many friends. The Gorbachev changes since 1985 nevertheless meant that the gerontocracy was losing its monopoly of power and influence. There were already large numbers of new faces around the Central Committee. As soon as it became obvious that everything was "going well" Morozov's family joined him in Moscow.

By 1991 Morozov was working as an assistant to the chief of staff of President Gorbachev. His immediate superior in the government hierarchy was Valery Boldin, a leader among the government insiders who removed the president from office later that year. The coup d'état took place during the holiday month of August while the Morozovs were out of town. They were staying with friends in Volgograd. When they got back to Moscow they found there was no one who would give Morozov another government job. For a year the family lived on Irina Morozovna's university salary of 120 roubles a month, while Morozov tried to get casual driving jobs where he could. The couple's Daewoo was their own and Kazan, where they had retained their dacha, was "only" a twelve-hour drive to the east by road: Morozov reassured his family that when he was driving it was a sign that he was resting. He also found some newspaper work between 1991 and 1993, contributing as a columnist to "Soviet Tartaria" ("Советская Татария"), a newspaper based in Kazan. Only after a year and a half did he find more permanent work, employed by a non-profit operation called "NPO Biology" ("НПО Биотехнологии"), initially responsible for public relations, and later listed as a deputy director.

=== In the Duma (1993–2012) ===
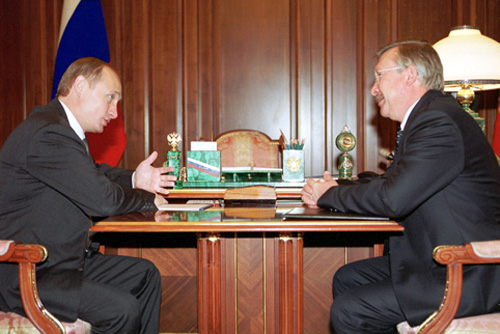
Russian President Vladimir Putin with Oleg Morozov on 16 May 2000

Following the "Black October" crisis, national elections were held in December 1993 for the newly reconfigured Russian Duma (lower house of parliament / "Государственная дума"). Morozov was one of those elected as a deputy (member) of the legislature. He continued to serve without a break till May 2012. At each of the six general elections held between 1993 and 2011 he stood for election, successfully, in a single member constituency in Tatarstan, representing Naberezhnye Chelny and Kazan.

In the first Duma convocation, which sat for two years, Morozov presided over the parliamentary subcommittee on co-operation between the regions. In the second and third convocations, which ran respectively from 1995 till 1999 and from 1999 till 2003, he headed the parliamentary group concerned with the regions of Russia. During the 1990s a relationship of some distance seems to have existed between Morozov and President Yeltsin: sources sympathetic to Morozov suggest that Yeltsin mistrusted Morozov's independence of spirit, while Morozov had no patience with what he regarded as the president's tsarist pretensions. During the first decade of the new millennium Morozov succeeded in creating a more constructive relationship, involving a growing measure of mutual respect, with President Putin. In the fourth convocation Morozov was a member of the emerging, and broadly pro-government, United Russia grouping. Between 23 December 2003 and 25 May 2012 Morozov served as one of the twelve Deputy Chairmen of the State Duma. Through most of that period, between 2005 and 2011, he was indeed "First Deputy Chairman" of the parliament. The fifth convocation ran for four years between December 2007 and December 2011. He served as a member of the parliamentary budget and taxation committee. In 2010 Forbes Russia published a report ranking the "most influential lobbyists" in the Duma. The report was presented in the context of an investigation into the links between business and politics. Morozov was reckoned to have achieved success with 21 of the 58 parliamentary bolls introduced, placing him comfortably in the magazine's "top ten": he ended up in sixth place. Reports also noted the correlation between his high ranking according to the journalists' somewhat mechanistic criteria and the extent of government orders to the defence industry factories of Tatarstan, and of other central government investment in socio-economic support for the region.

Following the extension of parliamentary terms, in 2011 Morozov was elected to the sixth convocation of the Duma, listed for the election as a United Russia candidate. He was again installed as a deputy chairman of the assembly and he again served as a member of the parliamentary budget and taxation committee. His parliamentary powers and duties were terminated ahead of schedule, however, on 6 June 2012, in connection with his transfer to the presidential office.

=== Head of the office of the President of the Russian Federation for Internal Policy (2012–2015) ===
Between 25 May 2012 and 23 March 2015 Morozov served under Vladimir Putin as "Head of the office of the President of the Russian Federation for Internal Policy". (Note: "начальник Управления Президента Российской Федерации по внутренней политике")

=== In Federation Council (2015–2020) ===
On 18 September 2015 Rustam Minnikhanov, in his capacity as President of Tatarstan, nominated Morozov to serve as a senator in the Federation Council ("Совет Федерации"). During his five-year term Morozov represented the State Council of the Republic of Tatarstan in the national council (parliament) of the Russian Federation. He also served, within the Federation Council, as a member of the International Affairs Committee.

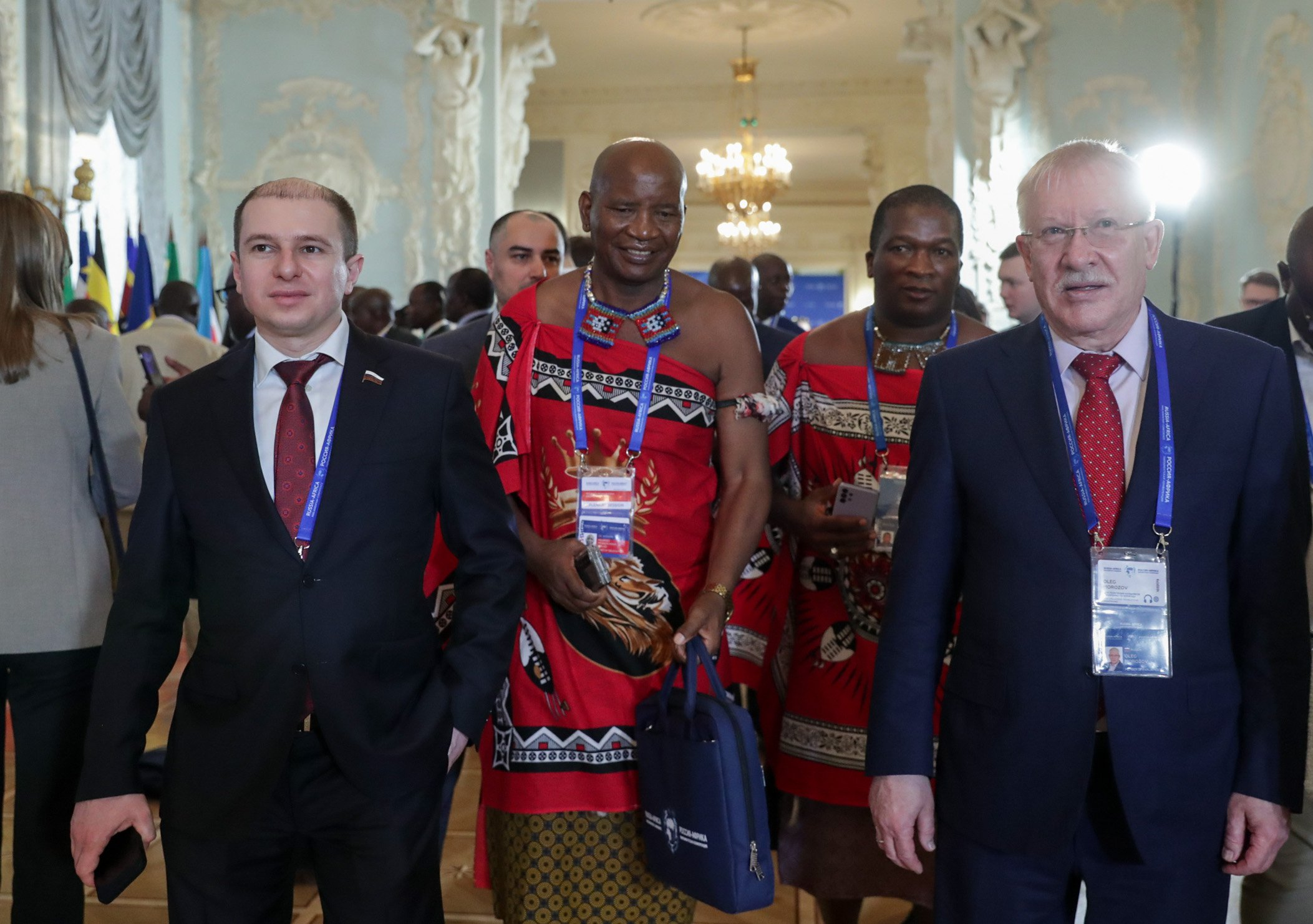
Morozov at the “Russia-Africa” parliamentary conference in Moscow on 20 March 2023

=== Russo Ukrainian War ===
During the 2022 Russian invasion of Ukraine, he wanted Russia to "de-nazify" Ukraine, and after that to do the same to Poland. He has suggested that Russia could attack Tower Bridge in London.

Morozov is subject to financial sanctions from the EU.

== Personal life ==
From 1974 to 2015 he was married to Zemfira "Irina" Gubaidullina Morozova. He has two children. In 1999, during an interview, Morozov was "outed" by his wife as a collector of hippopotami.

== Recognition (selection) ==
- 2003 Order "For Merit to the Fatherland" Order IV class: Breast Cross
- 2006 Medal for Supporting the Military, awarded by the Ministry for Internal Affairs
- 2008 Order "For Merit to the Fatherland" Order III class: Neck Cross
- 2012 Order of Honour
- 2015 Award of the Republic of Crimea "for faithful duty"
- 2019 Order of Alexander Nevsky
- Medal "In Commemoration of the 850th Anniversary of Moscow"
- Medal "In Commemoration of the 300th Anniversary of Saint Petersburg"
- Medal "In Commemoration of the 1000th Anniversary of Kazan"
- Certificate of Honour from the Government of the Russian Federation
- Formal thanks from the President of Russia. Twice.
