= Fandas Safiullin =

Russian politician (1936–2021)

- Фандас Сафиуллин; Фәндәс Сафиуллин
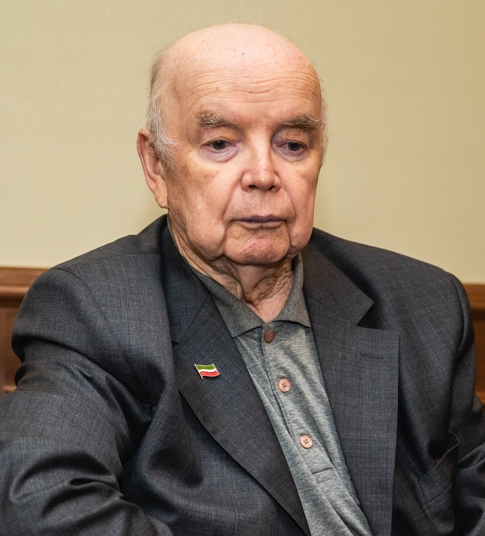
- Safiullin in 2021

Member of the State Duma
- In office 19 December 1999 – 29 December 2003

Personal details
- Born: 17 August 1936 Malbagush, Tatar ASSR, Russian SFSR, Soviet Union
- Died: 10 October 2021 (aged 85) Kazan, Russia
- Party: OVR

Military service
- Allegiance: Soviet Union
- Branch/service: Soviet Army
- Years of service: 1957-1988
- Rank: Polkovnik (Colonel)

Fandas Shakirovich Safiullin (Russian: Фандас Шакирович Сафиуллин, 17 August 1936 – 10 October 2021) was a Russian politician. A member of the Fatherland – All Russia party, he served in the Third State Duma from 1999 to 2003. As an ethnic Tatar, Safiullin fought for the rights of his people; for example, the right to use the Latin alphabet instead of the Cyrillic one.

In 1970, he graduated from the Belarusian State University, having already been a member of the Soviet Army since 1957. In 1990, he was elected to the Supreme Soviet of the Tatar ASSR, and in 1995 to its successor body, the State Council. On August 30, 1990, he proclaimed the Declaration of State Sovereignty of Tatarstan, which was passed by the Supreme Soviet and signed by its Chairman, Mintimer Shaimiev, who would later become Tatarstan's president.

Safiullin died from COVID-19 in October 2021. The death of Safiullin was, according to poet Razil Valeev, "a great loss to the people and the nation".
