= Nönägär =

Nönägär Нөнәгәр
- selo
- Location within Tatarstan
- Country: Russia
- Region: Tatarstan
- District: Baltaç District
- Time zone: UTC+3:00

Nönägär (Tatar: Нөнәгәр, romanized: Nönägär) is a rural locality (a selo) in Baltaç District, Tatarstan. The population was 910 as of 2010. Nönägär is located 34 km from Baltaç, district's administrative centre, and 137 km from Ԛazаn, republic's capital, by road. The earliest known record of the settlement dates from 1664. There are 10 streets in the village.
