= Pestrechinsky District =

Pestrechinsky District Пестречинский район (Russian)
- District

Other transcription(s)
  - Tatar: Питрәч районы
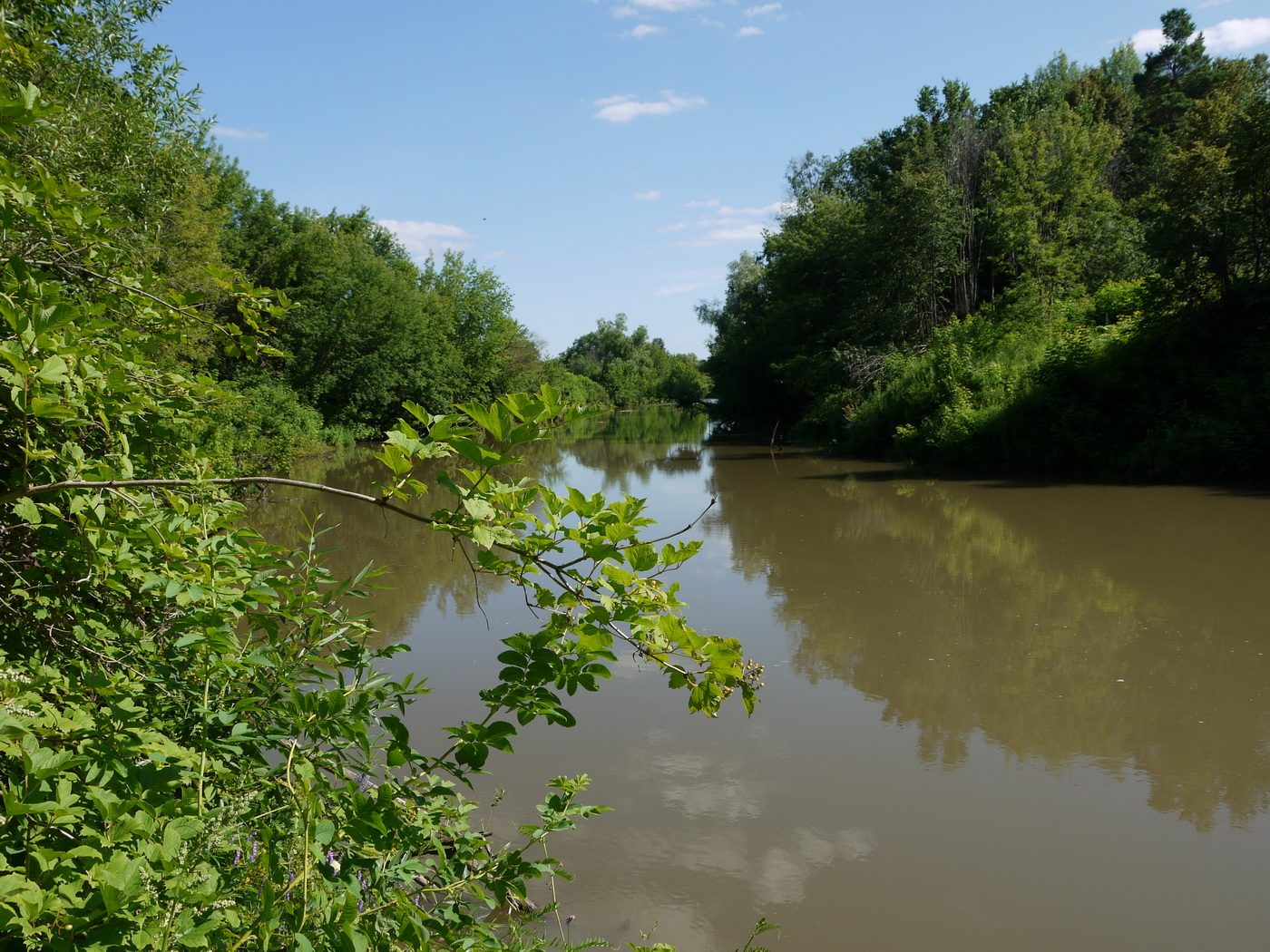
- The Myosha River in Pestrechinsky District

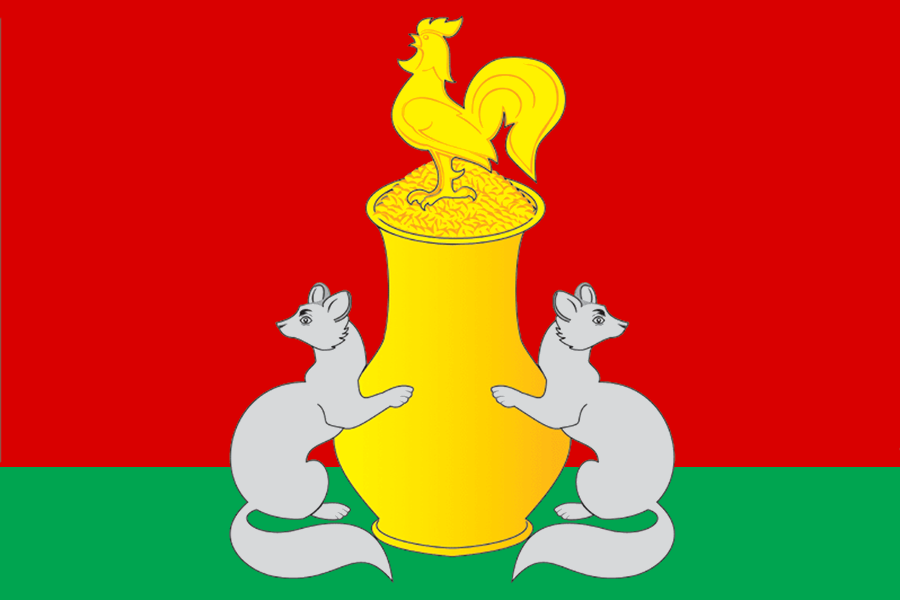
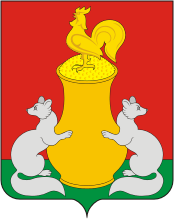
- Flag Coat of arms
- Location of Pestrechinsky District in the Republic of Tatarstan
- Coordinates: 55°46′N 49°44′E
- Country: Russia
- Federal subject: Republic of Tatarstan
- Established: August 10, 1930
- Administrative center: Pestretsy

Area
  - Total: 1,361 km^{2} (525 sq mi)

Population (2010 Census)
  - Total: 29,023
  - Density: 21.32/km^{2} (55.23/sq mi)
  - Urban: 0%
  - Rural: 100%

Administrative structure
  - Inhabited localities: 73 rural localities

Municipal structure
  - Municipally incorporated as: Pestrechinsky Municipal District
  - Municipal divisions: 0 urban settlements, 21 rural settlements
- Time zone: UTC+3 (MSK)
- OKTMO ID: 92648000
- Website: http://pestreci.tatarstan.ru

Population of Pestrechinsky District
- 2010 Census: 29,023
- 2002 Census: 28,454
- 1989 Census: 28,469
- 1979 Census: 30,687

Pestrechinsky District (Russian: Пестречи́нский райо́н; Tatar: Питрәч районы) is a territorial administrative unit and municipal district of the Republic of Tatarstan within the Russian Federation. The district is socio-economically developed municipal district with a total area of 1361 m^{2} located in the north-western region of the Republic of Tatarstan. The administrative center of the district is Pestretsy, a rural locality (tat. Питрәч). In 2019, the district had population of 45,054 people. The Pestrechinsky District is one of the most important agricultural regions of Tatarstan. The main sectors of the district economy are meat and dairy cattle breeding, poultry farming, horse breeding, and animal husbandry in general.

The estate of Vladimir Ulyanov's grandfather Alexander Blank stands on the grounds of the State Historical and Cultural Museum-Reserve "Lenino-Kokushkino" which is located within the district. Additionally the Pestrechinskaya stoyanka historical monument dating from the Bronze Age (XVIII-IX BC) can be found near the village of Pestretsy.

== Geography ==
The district encompasses a total land area of 1361 m^{2} with the district seat located in Predkamye. To the north, the Pestrechinsky district shares borders with the Vysokogorsky and Arsky districts, with the Tyulyachinsky to the east, and the Rybno-Slobodsky and Laishevsky districts to the south. The western part of the district adjoins to Kazan.

The flag is distinguished by its red field with a green stripe, most prominent among the motifs is a golden jug full of the same grain with a golden rooster standing upon it, supported by two silver minks sitting and turned around with tails at their paws.

The coat of arms of the Pestrechinsky district was approved in 2007 and entered into the State Heraldic Register of the Russian Federation under the designation No. 3190. In the center of the coat of arms, there is a jug representing the development of the craft industry in the region, whose inhabitants were actively engaged in jewelry, leather, wood, and metalworking industries. The jug filled with grain symbolizes the agricultural traditions and modern agricultural production that form the basis of the regional economy. The two minks represent another developed sector of the economy - fur production. The red color on the coat of arms represents the qualities of hard work, strength, courage and beauty. Gold signifies the bounty of the harvest, wealth, solar energy, and warmth. Green is a symbol of nature, health, youth, growth and life.

The regional flag was developed on the basis of the district coat of arms and was approved in May 2007. It consists of a red cloth with a green stripe 2/9 of the flag's width at the bottom edge. In the center, there are two mink holding a yellow jug with grain and a rooster standing on it.

== History ==
=== Etymology ===
The area is named after its administrative center located in the village of Pestretsy. There are two versions of the origin of the name. According to the first, Pestretsy is formed from the "motley people" (pestryy narod), or various workers who settled in the region in the 15th-16th centuries such as woodcarvers, fellers, potters, carpenters, tailors. Another version suggests that the name comes from the "speck" mushrooms (pestrets) from the moss family often found in the region.

=== Origins ===
Prehistoric peoples first began to settle on the territory of the modern Pestrechinsky district at the end of the ice age. These inhabitants were primarily engaged in fishing and hunting and remnants of their places of living were subsequently discovered near the village of Pestretsy. The village itself was formed more than 400 years ago, after the Siege of Kazan by the troops of Ivan the Terrible. During his reign, the Trinity-Sergius Monastery was erected on Sviyazhskaya Mountain on the banks of the Volga, an event that was followed by the granting of land to east of Kazan to its builders by Ivan IV. The first settlement in those parts was named the Trinity Wasteland (Troitskaya Pustosh'). Subsequently, the area began to be actively populated by various artisans. In the 16th century, the pottery industry became especially developed in the region, which would then grow into the production of artistic ceramics with Tatar national ornaments.

In 1787 the population of Pestretsy was 865 men and 913 women composing 310 households in total. According to statistics from 1901, there were 356 courtyards, 2259 souls, 66 private pottery establishments, several small brick factories, two industrial-type pottery establishments in Pestretsy, and a workshop for the production of ceramic chimneys, ceramic tiles, and tile tiles.

The Pestrechinsky district was formed on August 10, 1930. Until 1920, the territory of the present district was located in the Laishevsky and Kazan districts. From 1920 to 1927 the district was part of the Laishevsky and Arsk cantons of the TASSR, and from 1927 to 1930 it was contained completely within the Arsk canton.

== Contemporary Pestrechinsky district ==
After the collapse of the USSR in 1991, Tatarstan made an attempt to secede from the Russian Federation and gain its independence. In 1992, a referendum was held and as a result of Tatarstan proclaimed state sovereignty. However, the region would subsequently decide to remain part of Russia as a sovereign republic. At the same time, Tatarstan began to pursue an independent socio-economic policy and the districts within the republic received greater independence.

From 1998 to 2013, the Pestrechinsky district was headed by Shaikhulla Nasybullin, followed as head of the region by Eduard Diyarov who began to actively develop the agricultural sector in the region. Since 2018, the district has been headed by Ilham Kashapov.

== Population ==
As of 2019, there were 45,054 residents in the region. The district is ethnically heterogeneous with Tatars making up 57% of it is inhabitants, Russians 38%, baptized Tatars and small groups of Chuvash, Armenians, Georgians, Mari and Ukrainians make up around another 2% respectively.

From 2001 to 2011, the region experienced a population decline. In 2012, the birth rate in the district slightly increased to 343 births compared to 332 registered deaths. Additionally mortality rates have fallen over the past decade.

== Municipal-territorial structure ==
There are 74 settlements in the Pestrechinsky district, comprising 21 rural settlements. The administrative centers of rural settlements are the large villages of Belkino, Bogorodskoe, Ekaterinovka, Kibyachi, Kobyakovo, Kovali, Kon, Koschakovo, Kryash-Serda, Kulayevo, Lenino-Kokushkino, Nadezhdino, Otar-Dubrovka, Panovka, Pestretsy, Pimeri, Tatarskoe Khodyashevo, Chita, Shali, Staroe Shigaleevo and Yantsevary.

== Economy ==
=== Industry ===
Agricultural engineering interests in the region, are primarily represented by the "Press" company. Other large enterprises operating in the district are the regional operational gas service and the organizations "Partner" and "Stroitel".

=== Agriculture ===
The region is a key point in the development of the agro-industrial complex of Tatarstan and is characterized by its lack of urbanization. As of 2013, the rural share of the population was 100%. At the same time, the region is a leader in terms of unemployment in Tatarstan, which in 2020 was reported at 4.11% or more than twice the average for the republic.

The primary crops cultivated in the district include fodder, grain, leguminous crops, winter rye, barley, oats, and potatoes. In total, there are 26 agricultural entities in the district, including an agricultural cooperative, subsidiary farms, private limited companies, joint-stock companies, and peasant farms. Animal husbandry is another main area of activity with meat and dairy cattle breeding, poultry farming, horse breeding, and fur farming operations present in the region. In 2017, the gross agricultural output in the region amounted to 3.9 billion rubles, most of which related to the livestock industry.

In the Pestrechinsky district, there are active programs to support farms and private households, which are provided with subsidies, including for the construction of mini-farms, the purchase of milking machines, the purchase of young poultry, and other investments. A major investor in the region's agriculture is “Ak Bars Holding”. Other revenue-generating enterprises include the Koschakovsky fur farm, the Pestrechinsky poultry farm "Ak Bars" (brand "Pestrechinka"), the company "Gazovik" (consists of 3 branches: "Bogorodsky", "Tatarsky" and "Shigaleevsky"), the agricultural enterprise "Koschakovsky", a fish farm "Ushnya", horse farm "Kazansky", agricultural complex "Karpovka", "Pestretsy-agro", "Ratsin-Shali" and the "Pestrechinskaya food corporation".

=== Investment potential ===
The Pestrechinsky District has actively expanded cooperation with investors. In 2017, the volume of investment per capita amounted to almost 231 thousand rubles. In 2018, several large investment projects were launched in the district, including the reconstruction of a facility for the production of flexible packaging by the Danaflex company, with investment in the project amounting to 140 million rubles, construction of wholesale warehouses for alcoholic beverages (attracting about 200 million), the opening of a milk processing plant (30 million), and production of polyethylene pipes (20 million). In total, in 2018 investment in the district amounted to more than 8 billion rubles, of which 906 million were invested in the agricultural sector.

In 2019, an online CRM system was launched in the district to work with investors to ensure effective relationships, reduce the time for the provision of services from the administration and potentially increase the number of investment projects in the district.

The district has an industrial site "GreenwichPark Pestretsy" (in 2020 there were two residents "Spectrum" and "Technopark") and a technopark of the company "Danaflex".

=== Housing stock ===
In 2019, the head of the Pestrechinsky district, Ilham Kashapov, presented a sustainable model of rural development at the Interparliamentary Assembly of CIS Participants. From 2015 to 2019, within the framework of this model 575 thousand square meters of housing were commissioned in the district, attracting another 11.3 thousand residents to the district, after which the population increased to 43.7 thousand. In terms of housing stock under construction, the Pestrechinsky district ranks third in the republic after Kazan and Naberezhnye Chelny. In 2020, the Pestrechinsky district took first place in terms of the total area of residential buildings commissioned per capita. For example, as a result of the residential complex "Tsarevo" alone the population of the Pestrechinsky district increased by 16 thousand.

== Transport ==
Several large highways pass through the Pestrechinsky district including the M-7 (Volga) "Moscow - Kazan - Ufa", Shali - Sorochi Gory, Kazan - Lenino-Kokushkino - Tyulyachi - Shemordan, Staroye Shigaleevo - Pestretsy - Kulaevo (M-7). The Ministry of Transport plans to lay a part of the transport corridor "Western Europe - Western China" (section Yoshkar-Ola - Shali) through the territory of the region. The fact that the M-7 highway crosses the Mamadyshsky tract is a frequent cause of traffic jams. To solve this problem, construction of the Voznesensky tract is expected to begin in 2021, which will relieve the Mamadyshsky tract.

== Ecology ==
The most significant water source in the region is the Myosha River. In total, 146 springs have been identified in the region, of which 7 are of historical importance.

The Lenino-Kokushkinsky state natural-historical zakaznik (natural park) resides on the territory of the district, containing artificially created forests which are composed of species of pine and larch in the water protection zone of the Ushnya River.

== Social sphere ==
There are 29 secondary schools, 13 preschool institutions, 1 boarding school, and the Lenino-Kokushkin vocational lyceum in the region. In the field of health care infrastructure, there is a clinic, a hospital, and an intensive care unit as well as 4 medical outpatient clinics. There are 36 medical institutions in the region. These include the Pestrechinskaya central regional hospital, Koschakovskaya, Lenino-Kokushkinskaya, Panovskaya, and Shalinskaya medical outpatient clinics, as well as 31 medical and obstetric points.

Pestrechinsky district is included along the small ring of the tourist route "Pearl Necklace of Tatarstan" with attractions like the State Historical and Cultural Museum-Reserve of Republican significance "Lenino-Kokushkino" containing the estate of Vladimir Ulyanov's grandfather - Alexander Blank. In the village of Arkatovo, there is the Smolensk Church of 1746, where the miraculous icon of the same name is kept. There are three holy springs near the church, attracting pilgrims from all over the region.

Kryashens (baptized Tatars) live in the Pestrechinsky district which contains one Kryashen church the temple of St. Nicholas in the village of Kryash-Serda. The culture of the Kryashens of Zakazania and the Pestrechinsky region is considered the standard of the Kryashen folk tradition. The ancestors of the Kryashens of the Pestrechinsky district were old-baptized Tatars and retained pagan beliefs even into the 19th century. At the same time, from the 16th to the beginning of the 20th centuries, the Kryaschens adopted many Christian beliefs which began combine with their old traditions to create their unique traditions. In the post-Soviet period, the religious, cultural, and everyday distinctiveness of the Kryashens from the Muslim Tatars became the reason for a number of Krashen organizations to demand recognition of the status of an independent people. The most famous district Kryashen is the Hero of the Soviet Union Pyotr Gavrilov, the defender of the Brest Fortress. Another well-known native of the area is the honored test pilot of the USSR Avdeev, Ivan Yegorovich from the village of Priyutovo.

In the Pestrechinsky district there is a centralized club and library system, the Pestrechinsky Museum of Local Lore includes a department of the Regional Museum in the village of Kryashch-Serda specializing in the study of the life and national culture of the Kryashens, as well as the Museum of the Hero of the Soviet Union named after Pyotr Gavrilov in the village of Alvidino.

A branch of Tatmedia, Pestretsy-inform, operates in the region; it includes the regional newspaper Vperyod (Alga) which is published in Russian and Tatar as well as the Pestretsy TV channel. In 2013, on the territory of the village of Pestretsy on the right bank of the Mesha, two ancient archeological sites were found in the Laishevsky forest which would subsequently be designated the Pestrechinsky site which dates from the Bronze Age in XVIII-IX BC. An Eneolithic era site belonging to the Garino-Borsk culture from III-II thousand years BC was also discovered on the right bank. In total, along the coast of Myosha, archaeologists have recorded a cultural layer 45 meters long.

In 2010, in the vicinity of the village of Lenino-Kokushkino, a treasure hoard of 350 silver coins was discovered. The hoard contained coins minted on behalf of the Moscow rulers Ivan III, Vasily III, Ivan IV at the mints of Moscow, Tver, Novgorod, and Pskov.
