= Pestretsy =

Pestretsy Пестрецы
- Selo

Other transcription(s)
  - Tatar: Питрәч
- Interactive map of Pestretsy
- Location within Tatarstan Location within European Russia Location within Russia
- Coordinates: 55°45′23″N 49°39′03″E
- Country: Russia
- Federal subject: Tatarstan
- Founded: 16th century (Julian)

Population (2010 Census)
  - Total: 8,102
  - Estimate (2021): 11,601 (+43.2%)
- Time zone: UTC+3 (MSK)
- Postal code: 422770
- OKTMO ID: 92648455101

Pestretsy (Russian: Пестрецы, Tatar: Питрәч) is a rural locality (a selo) and the administrative center of Pestrechinsky District of the Republic of Tatarstan, Russia. Population: 8,102 (2010 census); 7,297 (2002 census); 6,210 (1989 Soviet census).
