= Zainsky District =

Zainsky District Заинский район (Russian)
- District

Other transcription(s)
  - Tatar: Зәй районы
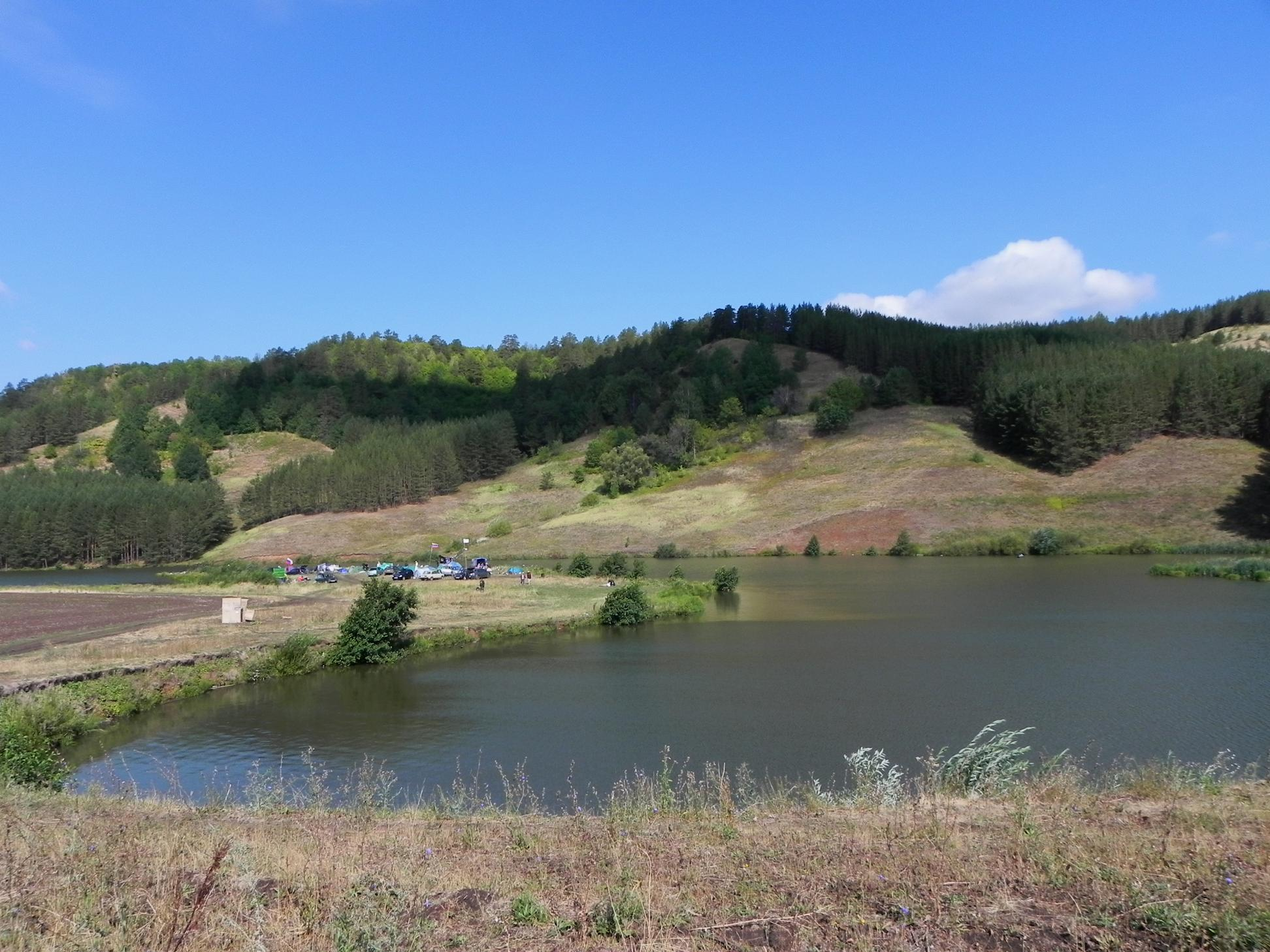
- Lake Bagryazh, Zainsky District

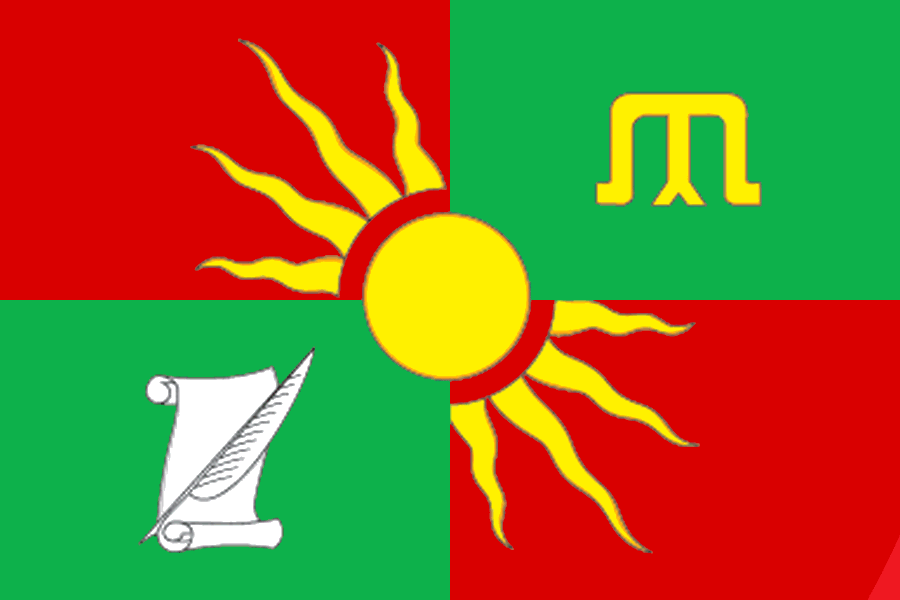
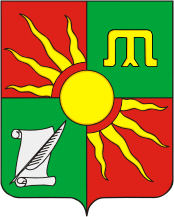
- Flag Coat of arms
- Location of Zainsky District in the Republic of Tatarstan
- Coordinates: 55°18′N 52°01′E
- Country: Russia
- Federal subject: Republic of Tatarstan
- Established: 10 February 1935
- Administrative center: Zainsk

Area
  - Total: 1,861.6 km^{2} (718.8 sq mi)

Population (2010 Census)
  - Total: 15,978
  - Density: 8.5829/km^{2} (22.230/sq mi)
  - Urban: 0%
  - Rural: 100%

Administrative structure
  - Inhabited localities: 84 rural localities

Municipal structure
  - Municipally incorporated as: Zainsky Municipal District
  - Municipal divisions: 1 urban settlements, 22 rural settlements
- Time zone: UTC+3 (MSK)
- OKTMO ID: 92627000
- Website: https://zainsk.tatarstan.ru/

Zainsky District (Russian: Заи́нский райо́н; Tatar: Зәй районы) is a territorial administrative unit and municipality of the Republic of Tatarstan in the Russian Federation. It is in the east of the republic. The administrative center is the city of Zainsk. The name comes from the ancient Tatar word "Зай" which means 'river'. As of the beginning of 2020, 53,698 people lived in the district. The urban population of the city is 39,631 while the rural population of the district is 14,067.

The main branch of the district's economy is agriculture. The extent of agricultural land under cultivation is 1223.8 km^{2}. The largest hydroelectric power station in the Volga region is in the district.

== Geography and climate ==
The district is in the eastern part of the republic. It shares borders with Tukayevsky, Sarmanovsky, Almetyevsky and Nizhnekamsky districts. The district is on the northwestern slopes of the Bugulma-Belebey Uplands. The topography of the district is layered with lower regions at an elevation of 160–180 m, and higher terrain features reaching 200–240m. The regional climate is continental with humid warm summers and moderately severe snowy winters. Average January temperatures vary from −13°С to −15°С. The height of snowpack, which forms by the beginning of December, reaches 35–40 cm. In summer, the average daily temperatures remain above +15 °C. Hot and dry periods are possible, but, as a rule are short, ranging from 10–15 days in length.

== Flag and coat of arms ==
The sun on the district coat of arms symbolizes the developed energy complex of the region. A scroll and a quill pen represent rich traditions of spiritual culture. The Tamga (an ancient Turkic sign) is a symbol of the continuity of generations, historical memory, patriotism, and care for the historical and cultural heritage of the region. The green elements symbolize developed agricultural production. The gold color is a symbol of harvest, wealth, stability, respect, and intelligence. The silver represents the purity of spring water, perfection, nobility, mutual understanding. Red is a symbol of courage, strength, and beauty. The flag is based on heraldic elements of the coat of arms.

== History ==
=== Background ===
The eastern border of Volga Bulgaria lay between the Sheshma and Zai rivers in the 11th century. In the Middle Ages, a branch from the Great Silk Road to the ancient city of Syudum passed through the territory of the modern Zainsky district. Zainsk became a fortress city in 1652. A part of the Polotsk Szlachta were sent here, having decided to stay in Russia after the war with Poland. The Szlachta gained land and peasants in this territory instead of monetary compensation. The Smolensk Szlachta were also a significant part of the Zainsk landowners.

These lands became part of the Kazan province after the Russian administrative reforms of 1708. The territories were transferred to the administration of Orenburg in 1744 until they subsequently became part of the Ufa province in 1865.

The peasants of the Zainsk volost were freed from arrears of previous years due to the land reforms of Pyotr Stolypin in 1906 and local government began to encourage the relocation of farmers to their own lands. New villages appeared during this period: Bugulda, Vinokourovka, Krasny Yar, and others. Each peasant farm had at least nine acres of arable land and pastures. At the same time, 13 landowner families owned almost half of the volost's land.

The territory of the Zainsky district was part of the Menzelinsky district of the Ufa province until 1920. The Menzelinsky district became part of the newly formed Tatar Autonomous Soviet Socialist Republic as cantons of the same name in 1920. These territories were transferred to the Chelninsky canton in 1922.

Zainsky district was formed on February 10, 1935. A railway line Bugulma - Zainsk - Krugloye Pole was built near Zainsk in 1956. An asphalt road connected Almetyevsk and Leninogorsk with river docks on the Kama. The construction of industrial buildings and a cooling reservoir of the Zainsk regional state power plant began on the left bank of the Stepnoy Zai in 1956.

Part of the territory of the abolished Aktanyshsky district was annexed to the Zainsky district on March 26, 1959. The district was abolished on February 1, 1963 and its territory was joined to the Almetyevsky and Chelninsky districts, but the district would be reestablished on February 1, 1972.

The village of Stary Tokmak in the Zainsk region is known for being the landing site of the space descent vehicle No. 1 which landed nearby it with the dog Chernushka on board in March 9, 1961.

== Municipal and administrative status ==
The Zainsky municipal district has 1 urban and 22 rural settlements containing 86 smaller settlements. The administrative centers of the rural settlements are the villages: Aksarino, Aleksandrovskaya Sloboda, Sredniy Bagryazh, Begishevo, Bukharay, Verkhniy Nalim, Verkhniye Pinyachi, Verkhniye Shipki, Gulkino, Durt-Muncha, Kadyrovo, Nizhneye Bishevo, Novospassk, Popovka, Poruchikovo, Savaleyevo, Sarmash-Bash, Svetloye Ozero, Staroye Mavrino, Tyugeyevka, Ursayevo, and Chubukly.

Rinat Fardiev became the head of the Zainsky district administration in 1999. Municipal reforms gave birth to municipalities in Russia in 2006, after which Rinat Fadiev became the head of the Zainsky municipal district. He held this position until his death in 2008. The position of head of the district was then taken by Tatyana Voropaeva in 2009 until 2015 when the district was headed by Razif Karimov. Karimov was re-elected for a second term in 2020.

== Population ==
72.88% of the district's population live in urban conditions (the city of Zainsk).

== Economy ==
=== Industry ===
The district is home to the largest power plant in the Volga region run by a branch of "Tatenergo". Other notable regional enterprises include electrical engineering firm "TatEK", "Zayneftepererabotka", "Vtornefteprodukt", the Zainskiy metal plant and brick factory and "Zainskiy keramzit". The food industry is represented by the companies "Zainskiy sakhar", "Zainskiy cracker", "Zainskiy grain-receiving enterprise", "Zainsky meat-packing plant", and others.

The "KAMAZavtotekhnika" auto-wheel plant, a subsidiary of "Kamaz" has operated in the district since 1972. The plant constructed houses for automobile workers, a school, kindergartens, and other social facilities in the administrative center of the district. The plant was purchased by the German company "Mefro wheels" in 2013, after which the plant got the new name "Mefro Wheels Russia Zainsk Plant". The enterprise was closed in 2018. "Accuride Wheels Russia" became its successor.

An industrial park "Zaman" is located on the territory of the Zainsky district. The first resident began operations there in 2018. It is one of the largest holdings in the Volga region, capable of simultaneously storing 150 thousand tons of grain.

Over the past 5 years, the gross territorial product has grown by 65% from 31 to 52 billion rubles. The volume of manufactured and shipped products from the district reached 37 billion rubles. From January to September 2020, enterprises in the district shipped goods worth 22 billion rubles, nearly reaching the annual indicator from 2013 when the amount was 27 billion.

=== Agriculture ===
The main branch of the district economy is agriculture. The area of agricultural land in the district is 1223.8 km^{2}. Spring wheat, winter rye, sugar beets, barley, buckwheat, peas, and corn are primarily cultivated in the region. The main livestock industries in the district are meat and dairy cattle breeding. Almost 200 thousand tons of grain were harvested in the region in 2020, while the sown area of beets exceeded 9000 hectares, resulting in a harvest of 442.5 thousand tons. Regional agricultural firms include "Zay", "Zainskiy sakhar" and "Vostok".

The sector of agriculture and processing industry is a quarter of its own revenues of the budget of the Zainsky district in 2020. The share of farmers in investment in the region's economy has reached 40% over the past 5 years. In total it's more than 8 billion rubles. In the first half of 2020, gross agricultural output amounted to almost 519 million rubles (for the whole of 2013 it was almost 1.8 billion).

In 2018, the Zainsky agro-industrial park was opened in the district. According to various sources, from 90 to 110 million rubles were spent on its creation from the budget of Tatarstan. There is a trading floor, a processing facility for cutting meat and preparing semi-finished meat products, a facility for washing and packaging vegetables, refrigerating chambers, and a laboratory in the agro-industrial park.

=== Investment potential ===
In the period from 2010 to 2020, the ratio of the average monthly wage to the minimum consumer budget increased from 1.95 to 2.5 times. At the same time, in 2010, the average wage was about 14.5 thousand rubles. By 2012 it increased to 19 thousand. From 2013 to 2020 the district unemployment rate slightly decreased from 1.36% to 1.09%. The share of small and medium-sized businesses in the economy of the Zainsky district amounted to 13.6% in 2019. This is the 36th place among cities and regions of the republic.

According to the Committee of the Republic of Tatarstan for Socio-Economic Monitoring, regional fixed capital investments (in the full range of economic entities) amounted to 1.2 billion rubles or 0.6% of total investment in Tatarstan in the first half of 2020. According to the Federal State Statistics Service of the republic, almost 2 billion rubles of investment were attracted to the Zainsky district in 2019 (excluding budgetary funds and income from small businesses).

In terms of the direction of investment in 2020, leading recipients were development programs for agriculture, hunting, fishing (almost 175 million rubles), and mining (100 million). There are large, yet untouched reserves of the natural bitumen on the territory of the district. Investment in other sectors of the district economy include investments made in electricity (almost 75 million), manufacturing (almost 41 million), and construction (34 million).

=== Housing stock ===
Commissioning of residential buildings
	2018				2019				2020 (January–June)			
	m^{2}	%	in the Republic of Tatarstan		m^{2}	%	in the Republic of Tatarstan		m^{2}	%	in the Republic of Tatarstan	
	m^{2}	%	m^{2}	% of the district	m^{2}	%	m^{2}	% of the district	m^{2}	%	m^{2}	% of the district
Overall	17060	100	2409949	0,71	17017	100	2675529	0,64	11220	100	1353428	0,83
Including enterprises and organizations	-	-	1301195	-	-	-	1569808	-	-	-	551485	-
Including the population	17060	100	1108754	1,54	17017	100	1105721	1,54	11220	100	801943	1,40

=== Transport ===
The "Begishevo" airport is 30 km from Zainsk. The main regional highways are the "16A-0003 Naberezhnye Chelny—Zainsk—Almetyevsk", "16K-0858 Zainsk—Sheremetyevka", "16K-0862 Zainsk—Sukharevo", and "16K-0818 Zainsk—Sarmanovo".

The "Agryz—Naberezhnye Chelny—Akbash Kuibyshev" railway line crosses through the district. Stations and stopping points in the area (from Naberezhnye Chelny) are Begishevo, Zycha, Zainsk, Svetloye Ozero, Mavrino. The previously existing railway line "Zainsk—Kamskie Polyany" was dismantled in 1990.

== Environment ==
Forests cover more than a quarter of the district's territory. Most of the woodlands are located in the western and northeastern parts. They are inhabited by moles, hedgehogs, squirrels, dormouse, white hares, martens, foxes, roe deer; of birds - great grey owls, house owls, great spotted woodpeckers, black grouse, sparrowhawks, turtle doves, buntings and spotted flycatchers. The rivers Stepnoy Zai and Lesnoy Zai flow through the territory of the district.

=== Notable natural monuments ===
- Bukharaisky Bor is partially in the Zainsky district. It is an area of natural forest groves on the slopes of the Bugulma-Belebey Upland. Forests consist of pine stands of different ages, among which there are old-growth specimens with ages of over 120 years old. The territory is inhabited by rare protected species of fauna, including the burial eagle (included in the Red Data Books of Tatarstan, Russia, Europe, and the world).
- The Zainskoe reservoir was formed in 1963 on the Stepnoy Zai River to cool the circulating water of the local state district power station. Its length from north to south is about 12 km, and the width at the dam exceeds two kilometres. The area is 16.1 km^{2}, the upper part is swampy.

== Social welfare and public life ==
Local newspapers Zuy ofyklary ('Zainskie horizons') and New Zai are published in Tatar and Russian in the Zainskiy district. There are 24 preschool institutions and 27 education institutions in the district. Additionally the district is served by a school for children with disabilities, a polytechnic college, a children's art house and a children's art school.

The medical infrastructure of the district includes the multidisciplinary Zainsk central hospital. The hospital has a dental department, a pediatric department, an emergency department, a 24-hour hospital, and a day hospital. In addition to it, the Begishevskaya district hospital and 53 local medical points operate to serve the rural population in the region.

Cultural activities in the district are represented by the local history museum, children's music school, the regional and city house of culture, auto clubs, village clubs, houses of culture, and libraries. There are 72 sites associated with the commemoration of events of the Great Patriotic War in the district. There are 13 memorial plaques and 23 cultural heritage sites, two of which are of significance at the republic level.

== Bibliography ==
- Vedomosti Verhovnogo Soveta SSSR [Vedomosti of the Supreme Soviet of the USSR]. Kazan: Institut Tatarskoi entsiklopedii AN RT. 1959.
- Ivanov, D.; Shagidullin, R.; Ziganshin, I.; Osmelkin, E. (2011). "Donnye otlozhenija Zainskogo vodohranilishha [Bottom sediments of the Zainsk reservoir]". Uchenye Zapiski Kazanskogo Universiteta. Seriya Estestvennye Nauki. 153 (1): 190–202.
- Igdavletov, I. (2020). "Bashkortostan v jugo-vostochnoj vneshnej politike Rossii v XVIII v. [Bashkortostan in the south-eastern foreign policy of Russia in the 18th century.]". Problemy Vostokovedeniya. 1 (87): 39–44.
- Izmailov, I. (2012). "Stanovlenie srednevekovoj Bulgarii: ot plemeni k gosudarstvu [Formation of medieval Bulgaria: from tribe to state]". Studia Slavica et Balcanica Petropolitana. July–December (2).
- Nacional'nyj arhiv Respubliki Tatarstan: Putevoditel'. 2 izdanie [National Archives of the Republic of Tatarstan: Guide. 2nd edition]. Kazan: Gasyr. 1999. Archived from the original on May 17, 2014.
- Zigashin, I.I.; Ivanov, D.V.; Tomaeva, I.F. (2015). Ekologicheskii gid po zelenym ugolkam Respubliki Tatarstan [Ecological guide to the nature of the Republic of Tatarstan] (PDF). Kazan: Foliant. Archived from the original (PDF) on January 8, 2021.
- Pospelov, E. M. (2008). Geograficheskie nazvaniia mira. Toponimicheskii slovar' [Geographic names of the world. Toponymic dictionary]. Moscow: Astrel, AST.
