= Leninogorsky District =

District in Tatarstan, Russia

Leninogorsky District Лениногорский район (Russian)
- District

Other transcription(s)
  - Tatar: Лениногорск районы
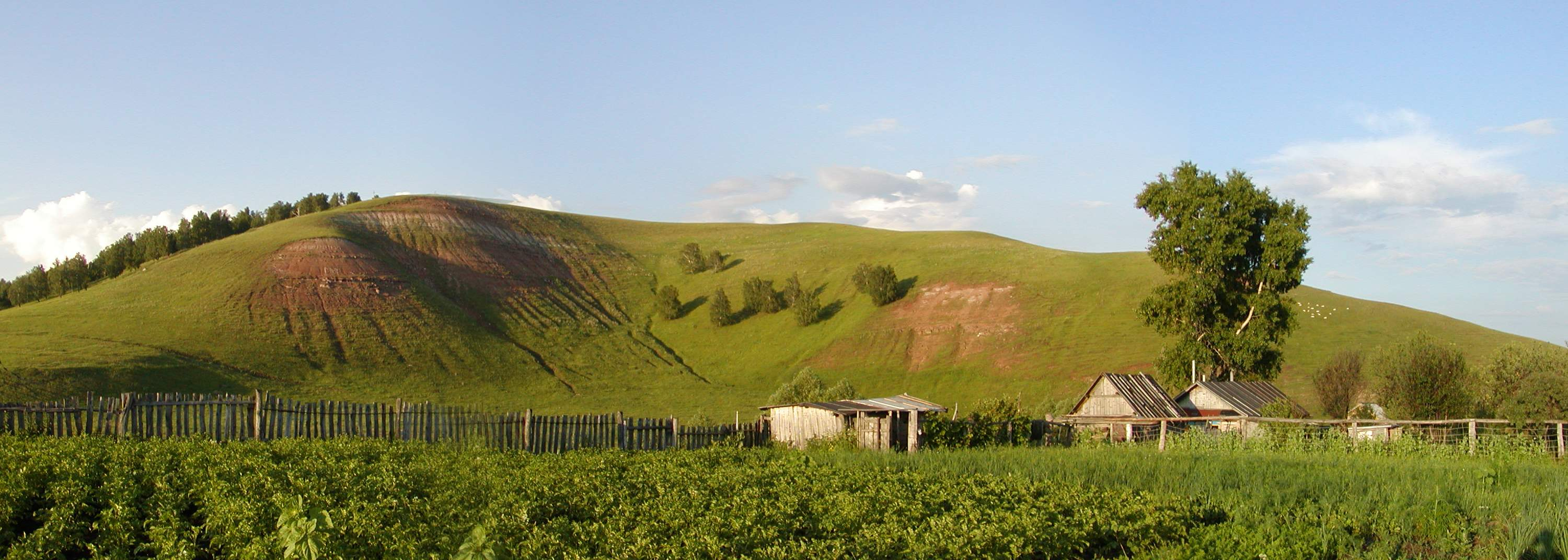
- Hill "Mir", Leninogorsky District

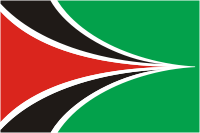
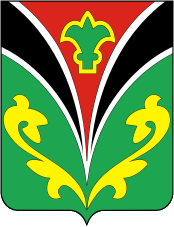
- Flag Coat of arms
- Location of Leninogorsky District in the Republic of Tatarstan
- Coordinates: 54°35′38″N 52°18′10″E
- Country: Russia
- Federal subject: Tatarstan
- Administrative center: Leninogorsk

Area
  - Total: 1,843.20 km^{2} (711.66 sq mi)

Population (2010 Census)
  - Total: 22,700
  - Density: 12.3/km^{2} (31.9/sq mi)
  - Urban: 0%
  - Rural: 100%

Administrative structure
  - Inhabited localities: 66 rural localities

Municipal structure
  - Municipally incorporated as: Leninogorsky Municipal District
  - Municipal divisions: 1 urban settlements, 24 rural settlements
- Time zone: UTC+3 (MSK)
- OKTMO ID: 92636000
- Website: http://leninogorsk.tatarstan.ru/

Leninogorsky District (Russian: Лениного́рский райо́н; Tatar: Лениногорск районы) is a territorial administrative unit and municipality of the Republic of Tatarstan within the Russian Federation. The district is located in the southeast of the republic and encompasses an area of 1843.2 square kilometers (about 711.6 sq mi). According to the 2010 census, the municipality had a population of 22,700 people. The main city Leninogorsk is not included within the administrative structure of the district.

The settlement of Pismyanka on the site of modern Leninogorsk arose in 1795. In the 19th century, the Novopismyanskaya volost was part of the Bugulminsky county (uyezd) of the Orenburg province, and then subsequently became a part the Samara province. In August 1955, the settlement of Pismyanka which was then part of the Tatar Autonomous Soviet Socialist Republic, was redesignated as a city and named Leninogorsk in honor of the revolutionary Vladimir Lenin. The Novopismyansky district was renamed to Leninogorsky in concert with these developments.

== Etymology ==
The Leninogorsk district received its name from the city of Leninogorsk. Until 1955, Leninogorsk was called Novaya Pismyanka, which separated from the village of Pismyanskaya Staraya (also Pismyanka Yasachnaya) in the 19th century. As the geographer Yevgeny Pospelov states, the common toponym Pismyanka comes from the Russian adaptation of the Tatar Pismen or Pichmen, which is often found in the names of rivers and villages in Tatarstan.

== Flag and coat of arms ==
In July 2005, the Council of the Leninogorsky municipal district approved its new heraldic insignia. The visual design of the coat of arms includes a black joist bordered with silver piercing into the green field, and there are two golden flowers tilting in opposite directions at the bottom of the shield. At the top of the coat of arms is a green tulip with a gold contour depicted on a red background.

According to official guidelines, the green field with flowers symbolize the geographical features of the southeast of Tatarstan, and indicate a variety of the local flora and fauna. Experts interpret the black joist in different ways: on the one hand, it might be considered as an oil gusher showing the economic prosperity of the area. On the other hand, the shape of the joist can be interpreted as a network of roads and in Leninogorsk as an important industrial and transport hub in the south-east of the republic. The opened tulip crowning the coat of arms demonstrates respect and preservation of national traditions. The flag is based on heraldic elements of the district coat of arms and reproduces the colors of the national flag of Tatarstan. The flag has a width-to-length ratio of 2:3.

== Geography and climate ==
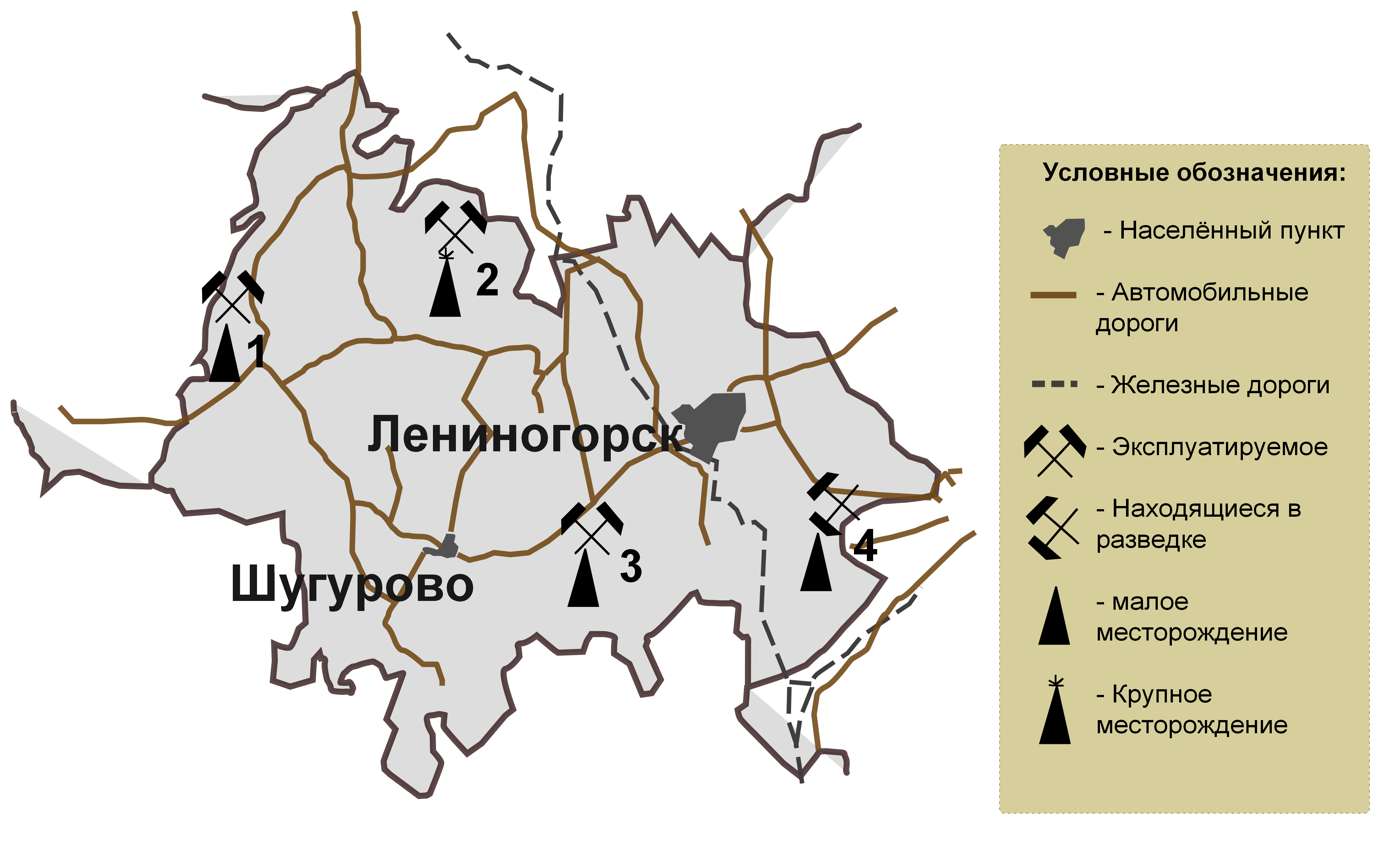
Map of oil fields in the region

=== Location ===
The Leninogorsky district is located in the southeast of the Republic of Tatarstan and shares borders with the Almetyevsky district in the north, Bugulminsky in the east, the Cheremshansky district in the west and with the Samara region (Shentalinsky and Klyavlinsky districts) in the south. The district spans 63 km at its widest point and stretchest 33 km between the furthest points on its north–south axis. The district is located in the forest-steppe zone and has a temperate continental climate.

=== Geological characteristics ===
The Leninogorsky district has one of the highest reliefs among the regions of Tatarstan. The topography of the district is diverse and the elevation of terrain features varies widely from 150 to 340 meters, with minimum elevations being recorded in river valleys while the highest points are located on the upper plateau of the Bugulma-Belebey and Shugurov Uplands. The local landscape is characterized by a number of river valleys, ravines and dens. The rivers Sheshma, Stepnoy Zai and their inflows cross through the territory of the district.

The Leninogorsky district has the largest number of springs in the republic at 263, and large deposits of oil, bitumen, limestone, dolomite, sand and gravel, clay and other mineral resources.

=== Flora and fauna ===
There are four nature reserves and wildlife sanctuaries in the region: the Shugurovsky hunting reserve, the Stepnoy nature reserve, the Sheshma rivers and the Stepnoy Zai. 25% of the district's territory is covered with broad-leaved woodlands with oak, maple, linden and birch growing there. Local forests have a rich grass cover and various types of plants are widespread here, for example, Russian bedstraw, green strawberry, Marshall thyme, feather grass, fescue, fescue, feather grass and other vegetation. In total, there are 110 plant species in the region, some of which are protected species included in the Republic Red List and the Red Data Book of the Russian Federation linear onion, long-leaved gerbil, pale yellow scabiosa and others.

The southeast of Tatarstan is distinguished by a variety of bird and animal fauna. Ornithologists note that 68 species of birds live here. The most widespread is the lark, the rarest are yellow wagtails and the field pipit. Among bird species included in the local Red Book are the burial eagle, quails, partridges, field harriers, meadow harriers, long-eared owls, rough-legged owls, golden bee-eaters and green woodpeckers. The forests of the district are inhabited by the European hare, foxes, European bobak marmots while raccoon dogs and steppe polecats are less commonly encountered. The local fauna also includes rodents such as the common vole, wood mice and bank voles, and protected species from the Red Book of Tatarstan including the steppe mouse and Eversmann's hamster.

== History ==
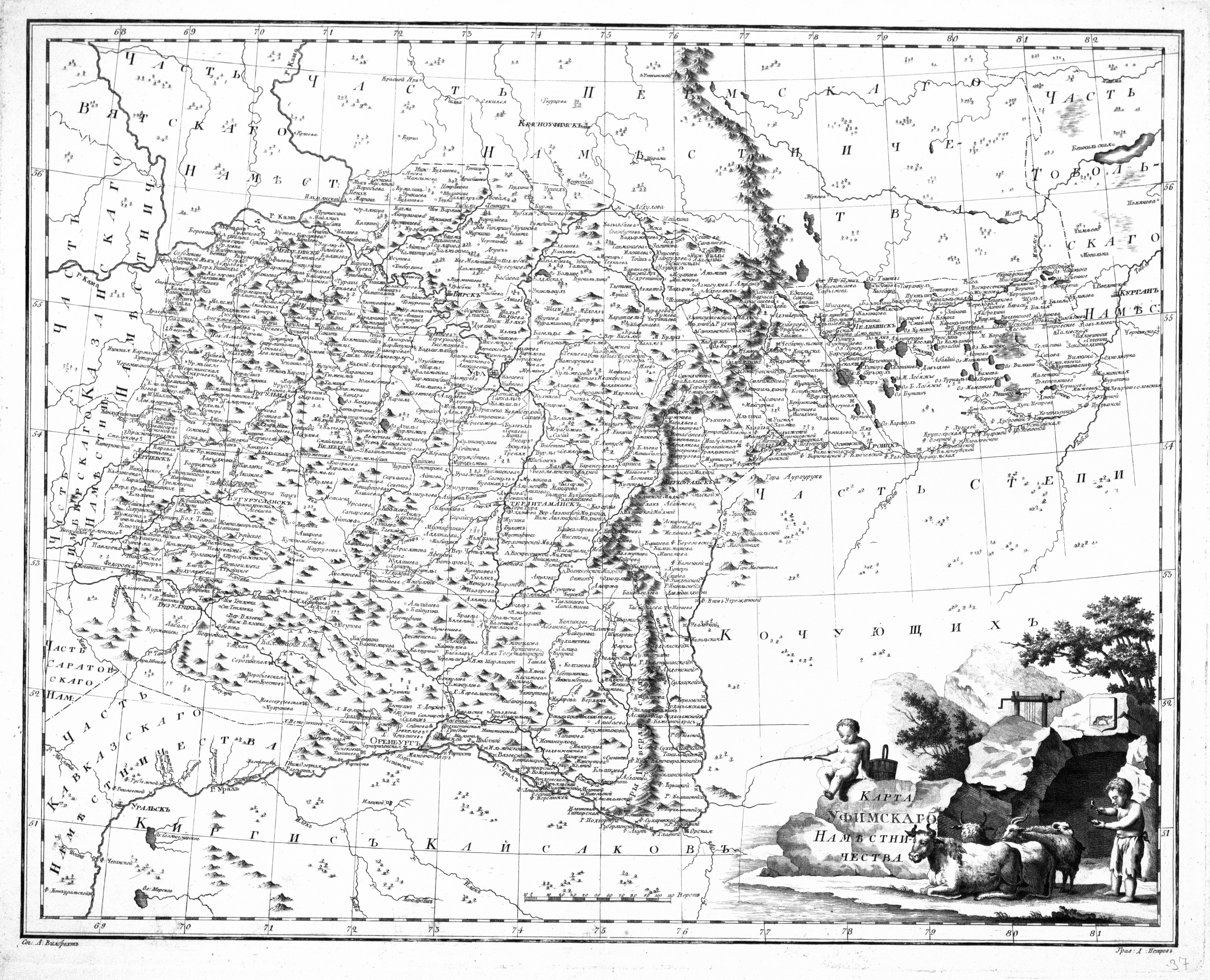
Ufa Province Map

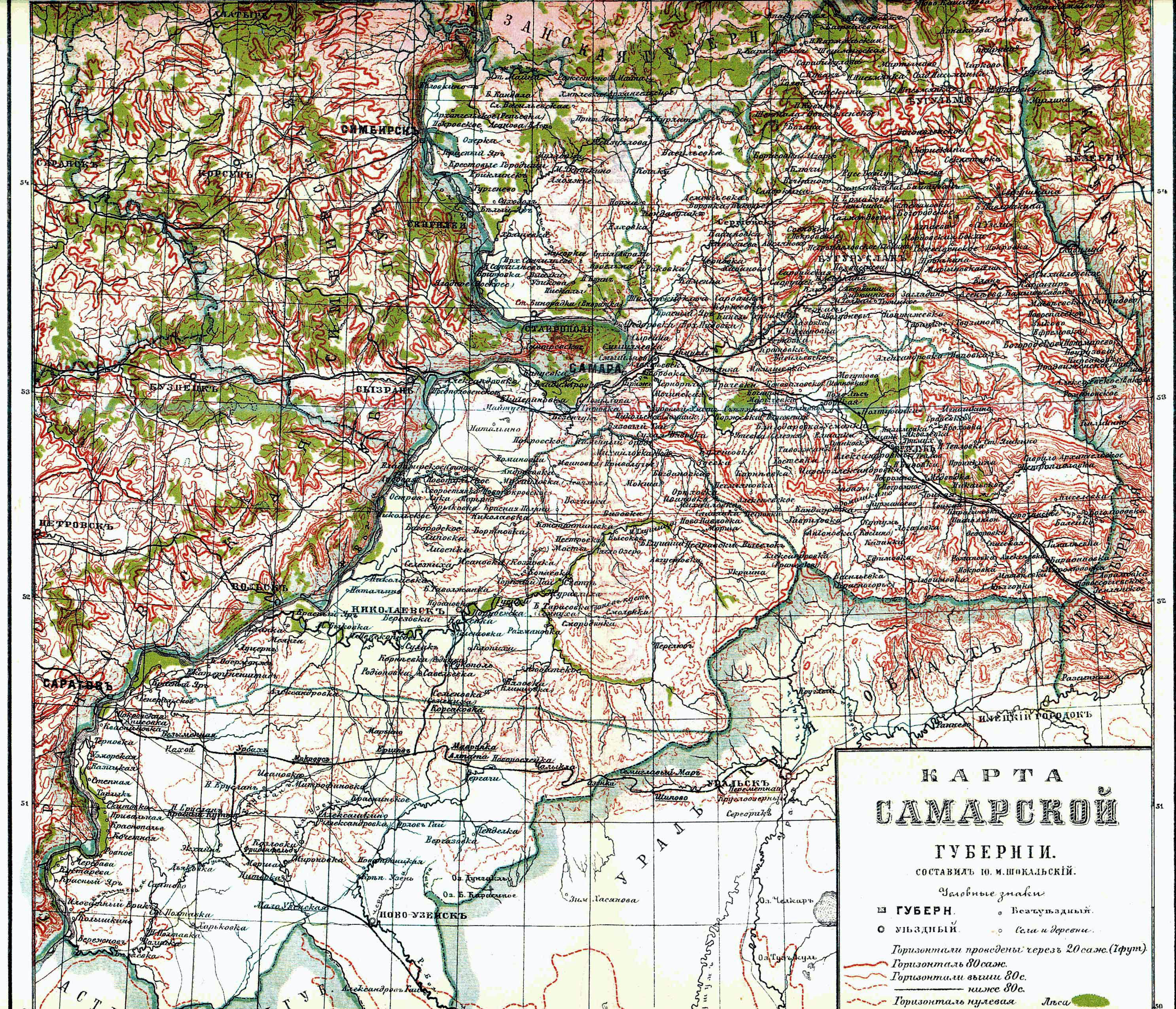
Samara Province Map

=== 16th–19th centuries ===
Until the 17th century, the south-east of the Kama region remained sparsely populated. According to available archaeological data, the pasture lands on the lands of the modern Leninogorsk region belonged to Muftiari nomads. In 1552, the Kazan Khanate was conquered by Ivan the Terrible and four years later the Bashkirs were also incorporated into the growing Russian state. In 1708 these territories became part of the newly formed Kazan province, which included all the middle and lower Volga and Ural regions.

In the 1730s, the villages of Malaya Bugulma (now the village of Medvedka) and Bolshaya Bugulma (the city of Bugulma) were established as the settlements for soldiers. The boundaries of the region repeatedly changed, and in 1744 these territories were included into the Orenburg province. The borders of the Kazan and Orenburg provinces passed along the Cheremshan River, then descended southeast to Kichuya before ascending northeast to Menzelinsk. In the 1740s, settlers began to move to the lands of the modern Leninogorsk region as a result of the Russification policy pursued by the tsarist government. According to the results of the population census in tsarist Russia carried out in the period from 1744 to 1747, there were only 13 villages in the region (Karataevo, Naderevo, Seitovo, Urmushla, Sary Bikchurovo, Analokovo, Ishtiryak, Karkali, Shugurovo, Toktarovo, Kuakbashevo, Shachili and Izmailovo). However, these villages were not the only settlements in the region, since Christian villages like the Pismyanskaya and Kuvatskaya settlements were not included in the census book of the yasak Tatars. According to the results of the third census of 1761–1762, Kuvatskaya Sloboda had 210 households with a population of 1,083 people, Pismyanskaya Sloboda amounted 109 households with 711 people and Medvedka contained 67 households and 486 people. By that time, new Tatar villages had also appeared, such as Sarabikulovo, Karataevo, Sugushla and Kirligach. In the 1770s, a number of Mordovian and Chuvash villages of Mordovskaya Ivanovka, Karamalka, Kuzaykino and others appeared in these lands.

In 1773–1775 a peasant uprising broke out in the Middle Volga region under the leadership of Yemelyan Pugachev. In October 1773, a riot engulfed Bugulminskoe Vojvodstvo and a total of ten insurgent detachments of about 15 thousand people, armed with 15 cannons occupied the region. After the suppression of the rebellion, a new wave of refugees poured into the territory of the present Leninogorsky district. The villages of Bakirovo, Novy Ishtiryak, Timyashevo, Upper Shirshila, Yultimirovo were subsequently founded as a consequence of this new wave of settlement. In 1775, Catherine the Great initiated an administrative reform and a number of provinces and counties changed their borders. On the basis of these reforms in 1781, the Bugulminsky uyezd was formed which included the territories of modern Leninogorsky, Almetyevsky, Cheremshansky and other districts. In 1781, the Ufa governorship became an independent province, consisting of two regions: Ufa and Orenburg. Eight districts were assigned to Ufa, one of which was the Bugulminsky uyezd.

By 1785, about 6,000 people lived on the territory of the future Leninogorsky district. Ten years later, the village of Novaya Pismyanka (future city of Leninogorsk) was established within the Bugulminsky uyezd. By 1797, Tatar villages had grown significantly in population. By that time, the population of Bugulma numbered 359 households with 1858 residents, Medvedka contained 99 households and 870 residents, Sarabikulov held 28 households and 178 residents while Seitovo-Kerligach had 40 households and 227 residents.

The Samara province which incorporated the Bugulminsky uyezd was formed in 1851 as a result of administrative reforms. By 1860 there were 37 settlements with a population of about 22,230 people in the province and already by 1872 the population had increased to 28,929 people. The formation of most of the large settlements of the Bugulma district had been completed by the end of the 19th century. Following the Stolypin reforms, a number of new villages had emerged on the territory of the district by 1905, for example, Novo-Elhovo, Akkul, Novaya Chershila, Maryanovka, Malakhovka, Volzhanka and Stepnoy Zai. Five years later in 1910, 55,015 people were living in this area.

=== 20th century ===
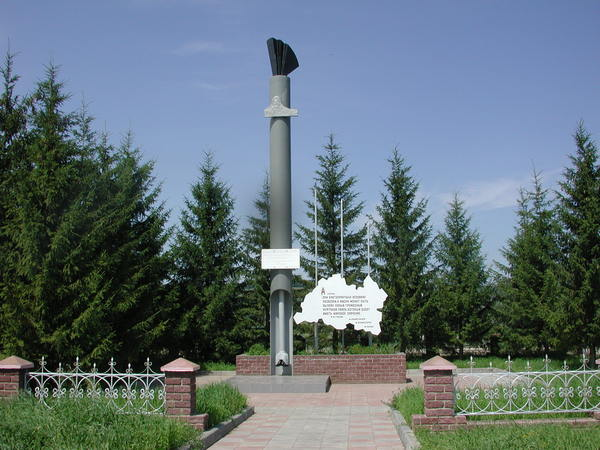
Well No. 1, which produced the first oil of Tatarstan on August 2, 1943

In 1917, the Soviets seized power in Tatarstan. Leninogorsk was one of the battlefields of the Russian Civil War, and the town changed hands several times between the belligerents. In October 1918, the Red Army occupied Bugulma, but the next spring the Bolsheviks were pushed back by White military leader Alexander Kolchak. By mid-May 1919, the city was again under the control of the Bolsheviks.

In 1920, the Bugulminsky uyezd, to which the Novopismyanskaya Sloboda belonged, was transformed into a canton bearing the same name within the Tatar ASSR. A year later, a severe famine broke out in the Volga region visiting great hardship upon residents and killing several million people. In the Bugulminsky canton alone, more than 35 thousand residents died of hunger, including a third of the population of the future Leninogorsky district. To fight hunger and help children, the “Promgol” canteen was organized here.

In 1930 the Tatar ASSR was divided into districts. Instead of the Bugulminsky canton, the Shugurovsky, Bugulminsky, Cheremshansky, Bavlinsky, Almetyevsky and later Aznakaevsky districts were established. At that time, the lands of the modern Leninogorsky districts had been divided between the Bugulminsky and Almetyevsky regions. In the early 1930s, therapeutic mud was discovered in the village of Bakirovo and a resort of the same name was built, and hospitals and first-aid posts began to open on the territory including the Nizhne-Cherchelinskaya outpatient clinic.

In February 1935, the Novopismyansky district was formed, which included the Novo-Pismyansky, Staro-Pismyansky, Zai-Karataevsky, Glazovsky, Mikhailovsky, Ivanovsky, Alyoshkinsky and Gorkinsky village councils. In the 1930s, clubs and libraries, amateur art circles, and a collective farm and state farm theater would all be opened in the district. In 1937, the airport “Bugulma” was built seven kilometers from the village of Staraya Pismyanka. The following year, oil exploration works were carried out in the southeast of Tatarstan. Soon the first settlement of oil workers, Zelyonaya Roshcha appeared in the Leninogorsky district.

At the beginning of the Great Patriotic War, about 10 thousand Tatars volunteered to go the front. It has been established that 6,789 soldiers from the Leninogorsk region perished in the war, with 12 of them being awarded honors as Heroes of the Soviet Union — Gilmi Bagautdinov Gilmi, Gazinur Gafiatullin, Ivan Denisov, Ivan Zavarykin, Ibragim Murzin, Samat Sadriev, Grigory Ushpolis, Akram, Islam Khalikov, Misbakh Khaliulin, Evstafiy Yakovlev and Vasily Yanitsky, three more received the title of full holders of the Order of Glory – Gabdulla Matygullin, Mikhail Alaev and Yakov Nikolaev.

Shortages of fuel during the Great Patriotic War led to research expeditions in the south-east of the republic. On August 2, 1943, experts discovered the Shugurovskoye oil field at a depth of about 750 meters. A few weeks later, the first oil gusher with a flow rate of 20 tons per day was established there. By a decree of the Government of the USSR dated March 11, 1944, it was decided to continue exploration work and build an industry on the previously discovered oil field, resulting in the opening of the Shugurovsky enlarged field on May 30, 1945. At the end of January 1947, drilling of well No. 3 began near the village of Timyashevo in the Romashkinskaya area, located 7 km from Novaya Pismyanka. In the same year, the well started producing up to 60 tons of oil per day, then up to 120 tons. Thus, the Romashkinskoye oil field provided a powerful incentive for the development of the regional economy.

In 1950, the Bugulmaneft and Tatburneft trusts were organized, and the construction of a new workers' settlement began. On August 18, 1955, by the decree of the Presidium of the Supreme Soviet of the RSFSR, the working settlement Novaya Pismyanka was transformed into a city and received the name of the leader of the revolution — Leninogorsk. Later the Novo-Pismyanskiy region was renamed Leninogorsky. In October 1959, parts of the Shugurovsky district with Staro-Varvarinsky, Spiridonovsky, Mordva-Ivanovsky, Kerligachevsky, Kuzaikinsky, Kuakbashsky, Urmashlinsky, Sarabikulovsky, Nizhne-Chershelinsky, Mordva-Karmalinsky, Staro-Kuvushinsky, Novo-Kuvashinsky, Staro-Ishtiryakovsky, Chutinsky, Novo-Serezhkinsky, Urdalinsky, and Mukmin-Karataevsky village councils along with the Stepno-Zaysky village council merged with the Staro-Pismyansky and Savochkinsky village councils to form the Pismyansky Soviet.

== Administrative and municipal status ==
Within the framework of administrative divisions, Leninogorsky District is one of the forty-three districts in the republic. The town of Leninogorsk serves as its administrative center, despite being incorporated separately as a town of republic significance or an administrative unit with the status equal to that of the districts.

As a municipal division, the district is incorporated as Leninogorsky Municipal District, with the town of republic significance of Leninogorsk being incorporated within it as the Leninogorsk Urban Settlement.

Currently, the district executive committee is subordinate to the council, the head of the district and its residents. The main departments of the committee are: the registry office, the department of architecture and urban planning, the department of economics, the sector of guardianship and trusteeship, the public point of law enforcement, the archive and others. Since October 2019, Zulfiya G. Mikhailova has held the position of head of the executive committee. The head of the Leninogorsky municipal district and the mayor of Leninogorsk is Ryagat G. Khusainov.

== Economics ==
=== Current situation ===
Since the mid-20th century, petroleum has been the leading industry in the Leninogorsky district. In 2019, the region's oil industry produced 3.45 million tons of oil which amounted to 46% of the gross territorial product. Many enterprises in the region are engaged in technical support of the oil and gas industry. Among the largest companies are Leninogorskneft, Lozna, AvtoSpetsOborudovanie, Leninogorskii mekhanicheskii zavod (Leninogorsk Mechanical Plant), Leninogorskii zavod zhelezobetonnykh izdelii (Leninogorsk Reinforced Concrete Plant), Leninogorskii pribornyi zavod (Leninogorsk Instrument Plant), LSK, Geotech, Leninogorskii remontno-mekhanicheskii zavod (Leninogorsk Mechanical Repair plant) and others. There are also several large light manufacturing and food processing enterprises operating in the district. A total of about 566 economically active small and medium-sized businesses are currently operating in the region. The economy of the Leninogorsky district accounts for about 3.5% of the total industrial production of Tatarstan. For the year 2019, the district ranked 12th in terms of socio-economic development among the municipalities of the republic.

Another significant share of the district's income, about 23%, comes from the construction industry. Many enterprises work only in the field of construction of facilities for the oil and gas industry, including Orteks, Uralstroyneft, RosNeftKompleks and other companies.

In the 2010s, the district administration embarked on a course to diversify the regional economy with a special focus on agriculture. By 2020, agricultural land occupied more than 55% of the total land area of the district. Wheat, rye, oats, buckwheat, potatoes and other crops are commonly cultivated in the district. Additionally, the livestock industry is among the prevailing sources of revenue for rural commodity producers. Horse breeding is a particularly active sphere of development in the district economy. For example, the horse breeding entrepreneur Farid Nabiullin has been striving for ten years to bring back the disappearing Tatar breed of horses. At the moment, there are only a few hundred remaining representatives of this breed in Tatarstan.

Economists have identified mechanical engineering, metallurgical and construction industries as the most attractive targets for investment in the region. The presence of secondary specialized and higher educational institutions, as well as the city's significant share of the working population in the district, determines the human resources potential of Leninogorsk. Within the framework of the republic project “Strategy 2030” aimed at facilitating the socio-economic development of the region, for the next decade, the district administration will try to create a comfortable living environment in cities and towns and improve the population's living standards.

As of January 2020, the number of registered unemployed citizens in the Leninogorsky district was 176, that is, approximately 0.37% of the total workforce. In 2019, the living wage in the district was 8958 rubles, and the average pension was 15,189 rubles, which is 6.2% higher than the previous year.

=== Transport ===
The Leninogorsk district occupies an advantageous geographical position and is located close to important transport networks. The specific requirements of industrial and agricultural production as well as those of the petroleum industry determined the location of transport routes in the region. Among the most important roads are the federal highway R-239 “Kazan—Orenburg—border with Kazakhstan”, the regional roads “Bugulma—Leninogorsk—Shugurovo—Shentala (to Nurlat, Ulyanovsk)”, “Leninogorsk—Karabash, Leninogorsk—Almetyevsk” and “Leninogorsk—Aznakayevo, Shugurovo—Sarabikulovo—Cheremshan”, “Almetyevsk—Sarabikulovo”.

Settlements are provided with a network of hard-surface roads with a total length of 739 km, 165 km of which are intercity ones. Local highways are serviced by private enterprises, of which 165 km are assigned to the Improvement and Greening Company, 207 km are served by Leninogorsk-Avtodor, and 205 km are served by Tatneftedor.

The “Agryz—Naberezhnye Chelny—Akbash” railway runs through the district. Stations and stopping points in the area are: 42 km, Vatan, 35 km, 30 km, Pismyanka (Leninogorsk), 19 km, Yalan, 13 km and 6 km/Akkul. In 2013, the percentage of the district's population living in settlements that do not have bus or rail connections was 1.2%.

== Social welfare and public life ==
In the Leninogorsky district, medical care is provided by the Leninogorsk central district hospital (CDH), which includes hospitals of the Central District Hospital and Medical Units, the Staro-Kuvakskaya medical outpatient clinic, the Shugurovskaya district hospital, a dental clinic, a children's hospital, a women's consultation center, a maternity hospital, as well as 29 feldsher-obstetric points and health centers. In 2020, the Honored Doctor of the Republic of Tatarstan Rim Amerov was appointed to the post of head physician of the Leninogorsk CDH. In November of the same year, additional hospital beds for patients infected by the coronavirus and pneumonia were funded for the Leninogorsk medical unit.

As of the 2019/2020 academic year, there were 34 educational institutions attended by 8,582 schoolchildren in the district. The average class size is 23.9 students in the city and 8.2 in the countryside. There are 12 schools offering instruction in the Tatar language in the region, which are attended by more than a thousand students. Three professional education institutions also operate in the region with dormitories designed for 1076 students.

The Centralized Library System (CLS) operates in the region, uniting 36 libraries with a total collection of about 735 thousand books and printed publications. The CLS serves over 50 thousand visitors annually.

The sports infrastructure of the district is presented by more than 240 sports facilities, including the Yunost stadium, the Sports Palace, arenas, three ski jumps, the Professional technical creativity club and other facilities. Students of sports schools take an active part in all-Russian and republican competitions. Sports and recreational work is carried out both in children's educational institutions and at enterprises. For instance, the specialists of the “Administration for Youth, Sports and Tourism” organize the Spartakiad among enterprises and educational institutions. In 2016, Leninogorsk became one of the destinations for the competitions of the Student Basketball League. According to the 2016 statistics, about 47% of the Leninogorsk population is regularly engaged in physical activities and sports. In February 2020, a carting competition was held in Leninogorsk, timed to coincide with the 100th anniversary of the formation of the Tatar ASSR. В феврале 2020-го к Лениногорске прошли соревнования по картингу, приуроченные к 100-летию образования ТАССР и 60-летию ДОСААФ Лениногорска

== Attractions and culture ==
At different times in Leninogorsk and surrounding areas lived the educator Gabdrakhim Utyz Imyani, the orientalist Riza Fakhretdin, contemporary writers Shamil Bikchurin, Zyamit Rakhimov and other outstanding figures of culture and art. In the Soviet period, twelve Leninogorsk citizens were awarded the Hero of the Soviet Union award for special services, three were awarded the Order of Glory, and twenty-three were awarded the title of Hero of Socialist Labor.

The city and the region have the Palace of Culture, the Museum of Local Lore, the country's first oil industry museum, parks of culture and recreation and other attractions. There are also 47 obelisks, 16 monuments and 17 sites of historical significance. Traditional festivals are regularly held in the area. For example, the village of Mordovskaya Karmalka organizes the "Baltai" holiday, the village of Novoye Serezhkino hosts a festival of Chuvash culture "Play the accordion!", while the village of Fedotovka revives the Kryashen traditions.

District temples

- Christian
  - Leninogorsk Holy Trinity Church (built in 1989)
  - Temple-chapel of All Saints in the village of Kamyshla (2000)
  - Chapel of the Holy Great Martyr Paraskeva Pyatnitsa in the village of Staraya Pismyanka (2000)
  - Temple of Archangel Michael in the village of Potapovo-Tumbarla (2002)
  - Temple of the Archangel Michael in the village of Spiridonovka (1889)
  - Temple in honor of the Archangel Michael in the village of Fedotovka (2007)
  - Church of the Life-Giving Trinity in the village of Novaya Pismyanka (1864)
  - Church of the Nativity of Christ in the village of Martynovo (1802)
- Islamic
  - Mosque "Ikhlas" in Leninogorsk (2006)

== Bibliography ==
- Artemyev, A., ed. (1864). Spiski naselennykh mest Rossiiskoi imperii, sostavlennye i izdavaemye Tcentralnym statisticheskim komitetom Ministerstva vnutrennikh del [Lists of populated areas of the Russian Empire, compiled and published by the Central Statistical Committee of the Ministry of Internal Affairs]. St. Petersburg: Izdanie Tcentralnogo statisticheskogo komiteta Ministerstva vnutrennikh del, 1861–1885.
- Burkhanov, A.A.; Nigamatzyanov, I.R. (2017). Drevnosti Vostochnogo Zakamia. Arkheologicheskie, epigraficheskie i istoriko-kulturnye pamiatniki Iugo-Vostochnogo Tatarstana.[The ancient sites of the Eastern Trans-Kama region. Archaeological, epigraphic and historical and cultural monuments of South-East Tatarstan.] Kazan: Institut istorii im. Sh. Marzhdani AN RT.
- Gallyamova, A. G. (2014). Istoriia Tatarstana i tatarskogo naroda, 1917-2013 gg.: Uchebnoe posobie [History of Tatarstan and the Tatar people, 1917-2013: A Textbook]. Kazan: Kazan Federal University.
- Khakimov, K.B. (1997). Oni srazhalis za Rodinu (Kniga pamiati) [They fought for the Motherland (Book of Memory)]. Krasnodar: Izdatel Malyshev.
- Materialy kollegii. Itogi raboty Ministerstva po delam molodezhi i sportu Respubliki Tatarstan za 2016 god [Collegium materials. Results of the work of the Ministry of Youth Affairs and Sports of the Republic of Tatarstan for 2016]. Kazan: Ministerstvo po delam molodezhi i sportu Respubliki Tatarstan. 2017. pp. 2489–2504.
- Medyanik, Yu.V. (2020). "Tendentcii sotsialno-ekonomicheskogo razvitiia malykh i srednikh gorodov (na primere goroda Leninogorska Respubliki Tatarstan) [Trends in the socio-economic development of small and medium-sized cities (on the example of the city of Leninogorsk, Republic of Tatarstan)]". Ekonomika, Predprinimatelstvo I Pravo (10): 2489–2504.
- Minkin, M.R. (2011). Stanovlenie i razvitie sistemy podgotovki kadrov dlia neftianoi promyshlennosti Tatarskoi ASSR v 1950-1960-e gg. Avtoreferat dissertatcii na soiskanie uchenoi stepeni kandidata istoricheskikh nauk [Formation and development of a personnel training system for the oil industry of the Tatar ASSR in the 1950s–1960s. The dissertation for the degree of candidate of historical sciences]. Kazan: GU “Institut Tatarskoi entsiklopedii Akademii nauk respubliki.
- Nogmanov, A. I., ed. (2019). Tatarskie seleniia Iugo-Vostochnogo Zakamia: ochagi prosveshcheniia i kultury [Tatar Settlements of the South-Eastern Trans-Kama Region: Centers of Education and Culture]. Kazan: Institut Istorii im. Sh. Mardzhani AN RT.
- Podkovyrov, N.G. (1910). Spisok naselennykh mest Samarskoi gubernii. Sostavlen v 1910 godu [List of populated areas in the Samara province. Made in 1910] (PDF). Samara: Gubernskaia Tipografiia. Archived from the original (PDF) on October 23, 2019.
- Pospelov, E. M. (2002). Geograficheskie nazvaniia mira. Toponimicheskii slovar' [Geographic names of the world. Toponymic dictionary]. Moscow: Russkie slovari, Astrel, AST.
- Tarkhov, S.A. (2001). "Izmenenie administrativno-territorialnogo deleniia Rossii za poslednie 300 let [Changes in the administrative-territorial division of Russia over the past 300 years]". Zhurnal "Geografiia" (15): 1–32.
- Turisticheskii pasport Leninogorskogo raiona [Tourist passport of the Leninogorsk region] (PDF). Almetyevsk: ФОНД Президентских ГРАНТОВ. 2018.
- Zigashin, I.I.; Ivanov, D.V.; Tomaeva, I.F. (2015). Ekologicheskii gid po zelenym ugolkam Respubliki Tatarstan [Ecological guide to the nature of the Republic of Tatarstan] (PDF). Kazan: Foliant. Archived from the original (PDF) on January 8, 2021.
