= Karabash =

Karabash (Russian: Карабаш) may refer to:

== Places ==
- Karabash Reservoir, a freshwater reservoir in the Republic of Tatarstan, Russia
- Karabash, several inhabited localities in Russia

== Surname ==
- Dmytro Karabash, one of the recipients of the 2007 Van Amringe Mathematical Prize
- Irena Ivanova, better known by the pen name Rene Karabash, Bulgarian writer and actress
- Yelyzaveta Karabash (born 1985), Ukrainian rhythmic gymnast

== See also ==
- Karabaş
