= Karabash (inhabited locality) =

Karabash (Russian: Карабаш) is the name of several inhabited localities in Russia.

== Modern localities ==
Urban localities

- Karabash, Chelyabinsk Oblast, a town in Chelyabinsk Oblast; 55°29′N 60°12′E
- Karabash, Republic of Tatarstan, an urban-type settlement in Bugulminsky District of the Republic of Tatarstan

Rural localities

- Karabash, Tyumen Oblast, a selo in Karabashsky Rural Okrug of Yalutorovsky District in Tyumen Oblast

== Alternative names ==
- Karabash, alternative name of Karabashevo, a selo in Karabashevsky Selsoviet of Ilishevsky District in the Republic of Bashkortostan; 55°23′N 54°11′E
