= Shugurovo =

Village in the Republic of Tatarstan, Russia

Coordinates: 54°30′41″N 52°07′57″E

Shugurovo (Russian: Шугурово; Tatar: Шөгер, pronounced [ʃɶˈɡɶr]) is a village (selo) in Leninogorsky District of the Republic of Tatarstan, Russia, located 30 kilometers (19 mi) south-west of Leninogorsk, the administrative center of the district, on the Lesnaya Sheshma River (a tributary of the Sheshma). Shugurovo was founded in the 19th century. It was granted the status of an urban-type settlement in 1950 but was demoted to a rural locality on October 25, 2004.

Population: 2,239 (2002 census); 2,032 (1989 Soviet census). In 1989, ethnic Tatars constituted 86.9% and ethnic Russians–8.9% of the population. The majority of the village population is employed in the boehmite, bitumen, woodworking, and agricultural machinery industries.

There is a secondary school, a cultural center, a hospital, and a mosque in Shugurovo.
