= Leninogorsk =

Leninogorsk may refer to:

- Leninogorsk, Russia, a town in the Republic of Tatarstan, Russia
- Leninogorsk, name of Ridder, a town in Kazakhstan, in 1941–2002
