= Irken =

Irken may refer to:

- Irkens, an imperialistic alien race from the American animated TV series Invader Zim (2001)
- Irken (rural locality), a rural locality (a village) in Karabash Urban Settlement of Bugulminsky District in the Republic of Tatarstan, Russia
