= Zainsk Reservoir =

- Zay Reservoir
- Location within Russia
- Location: Tatarstan
- Coordinates: 55°16′44″N 52°02′23″E
- Type: reservoir
- Basin countries: Russia
- Max. length: 12 km (7.5 mi)
- Max. width: 1.7 km (1.1 mi)
- Surface area: 20.5 km^{2} (7.9 sq mi)
- Average depth: 3.1 m (10 ft)
- Water volume: 52.3×10^{6} m^{3} (42,400 acre⋅ft)
- Settlements: Zainsk

Zainsk Reservoir or Zay Reservoir (Russian: Заинское водохранилище, Tatar: Зәй сусаклагычы) is a reservoir of the Zay River near Zainsk, Tatarstan, Russian Federation. It was filled in 1963 to be a cooling pond for Zainsk TTP. It has surface area 20.5 km², a length 12 km, mean width 1.7 km, mean depth 3.1 m and a volume 63 million cubic meters.
