= Zainsk =

Town in the Republic of Tatarstan, Russia

Zainsk Заинск
- Town
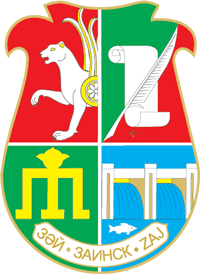
- Coat of arms
- Interactive map of Zainsk
- Location of Zainsk Zainsk (Tatarstan)
- Coordinates: 55°18′N 52°01′E
- Country: Russia
- Federal subject: Tatarstan
- Founded: 1652–1656
- Town status since: 1978
- Elevation: 90 m (300 ft)

Population (2010 Census)
  - Total: 41,803
  - Estimate (2025): 38,363 (−8.2%)

Administrative status
  - Subordinated to: town of republic significance of Zainsk
  - Capital of: town of republic significance of Zainsk, Zainsky District

Municipal status
  - Municipal district: Zainsky Municipal District
  - Urban settlement: Zainsk Urban Settlement
  - Capital of: Zainsky Municipal District, Zainsk Urban Settlement
- Time zone: UTC+3 (MSK)
- Postal code: 423520–423524
- OKTMO ID: 92627101001

Zainsk (Russian: Заи́нск) is a town in the Republic of Tatarstan, Russia, located on the Stepnoy Zay River (Kama's tributary), 287 kilometers (178 mi) east of Kazan. Population: 39,739 (2021 census).

== Geography ==
Zainsk Reservoir, along the Zay River, is located near the town.

== Administrative and municipal status ==
Within the framework of administrative divisions, Zainsk serves as the administrative center of Zainsky District, even though it is not a part of it. As an administrative division, it is, together with the settlement of Karmalka, incorporated separately as the town of republic significance of Zainsk—an administrative unit with the status equal to that of the districts. As a municipal division, the town of republic significance of Zainsk is incorporated within Zainsky Municipal District as Zainsk Urban Settlement.
