= Almetyevsk =

City in the Republic of Tatarstan, Russia

Almetyevsk Альметьевск
- City

Other transcription(s)
  - Tatar: Әлмәт
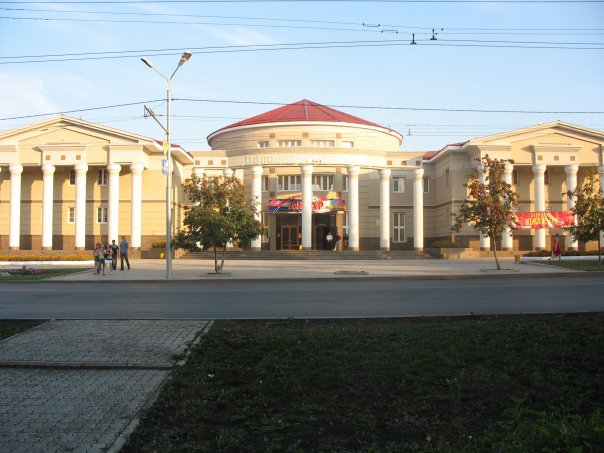
- Almetyevsk Youth Center

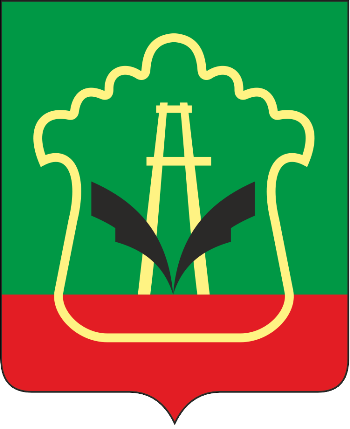
- Coat of arms
- Interactive map of Almetyevsk
- Location of Almetyevsk Almetyevsk (Tatarstan)
- Coordinates: 54°54′N 52°18′E
- Country: Russia
- Federal subject: Tatarstan
- First mention: 1720
- City status since: 1953
- Elevation: 110 m (360 ft)

Population (2010 Census)
  - Total: 146,393
  - Estimate (2012): 157,673 (+7.7%)
  - Rank: 117th in 2010
  - Density: 3,845/km^{2} (9,960/sq mi)

Administrative status
  - Subordinated to: city of republic significance of Almetyevsk
  - Capital of: city of republic significance of Almetyevsk, Almetyevsky District

Municipal status
  - Municipal district: Almetyevsky Municipal District
  - Urban settlement: Almetyevsk Urban Settlement
  - Capital of: Almetyevsky Municipal District, Almetyevsk Urban Settlement
- Time zone: UTC+3 (MSK)
- Postal code: 423450-423465
- Dialing code: +7 8553
- OKTMO ID: 92608101001

Almetyevsk (Russian: Альме́тьевск; IPA: [ɐlʲˈmʲetʲjɪfsk]; Tatar: Әлмәт) is a city in Tatarstan, Russia, located on the left bank of the Zay River (Kama's tributary) 265 kilometers (165 mi) southeast of Kazan. Population: 146,393 (2010 census); 140,437 (2002 census); 129,008 (1989 Soviet census); 77,000 (1969); 49,000 (1959).

== History ==
Almetyevsk is one of the youngest cities in the republic. Located along the federal highway (Russian: автотрасса федерального значения) R239 "Orenburgsky" Kazan - Orenburg (in Cyrillic P239 (Russian: "Оренбургский"), it was founded as an oil-processing settlement 15 kilometres (9.3 mi) northwest of the Almetyevskaya railway station (79 km marker) on the Kuybyshev Railway near Leninogorsk and the Akbash (Bugulminsky District) - Agryz railway line and was granted town status in 1953.

== Administrative and municipal status ==
Within the framework of administrative divisions, Almetyevsk serves as the administrative center of Almetyevsky District, even though it is not a part of it. As an administrative division, it is incorporated separately as the city of republic significance of Almetyevsk—an administrative unit with the status equal to that of the districts. As a municipal division, the city of republic significance of Almetyevsk is incorporated within Almetyevsky Municipal District as Almetyevsk Urban Settlement.

== Cycling capital of Russia ==
Almetyevsk has created highly developed cycling infrastructure, considered the best in Russia. Thanks to this improvement the bicycle has become a major form of transport for the city. Its development began in 2016, as part of a set of measures to increase the attractiveness of the city. This has led to Almetyevsk receiving the unofficial title of "The cycling capital of Russia".

== Industry ==
Almetyevsk is an important center of Russia's oil industry. Since 1960, the Druzhba pipeline has started in Almetyevsk. Pipelines to Nizhny Novgorod, Samara, and Subkhankulovo also start in this city. The city houses several oil equipment plants producing pipes, pumps and other oil tools. OAO Tatneft (Russian: ОАО "Татнефть") has offices here and is a major operator of the Romashkino Field in the Volga-Ural oil and gas region, also called the "Second Baku."

On 25 May 2017, Denis or Danis Nurgaliev (Russian: Данис Карлович Нургалиев; born 1 September 1956, Abdullyeno, Burayevsky Raion, Republic of Bashkortostan, USSR), who is the vice president and director of the Institute of Geology and Petroleum Technologies, led a Russian delegation from the Kazan Federal University (KFU) to Karamay in China and met with Zhao Wenquan, who was the secretary of the Karamay municipal committee, in which he proposed that Almetyevsk would begin a friendly relationship with Karamay. In October 2016, he had visited Karamay to begin a cooperation agreement with the Southwest Petroleum University and Xinjiang Branch Force New Technology Development Co Ltd.

== Sports ==
Major sport enterprise in the city is an ice-hockey team "Neftyanik" presented in VHL league and sponsored by TatNeft. The team's main records are bronze medalists of Russian Championship Higher League (2002/2003 years ), gold medalists of Russian Championship Higher League (1997-1998 and 1999–2000), silver medalists of VHL 2010/2011 year, 2015/2016 Bratina Cup winners

== Twin towns and sister cities ==
- Balkanabat
- Karamay
