= Zay (river) =

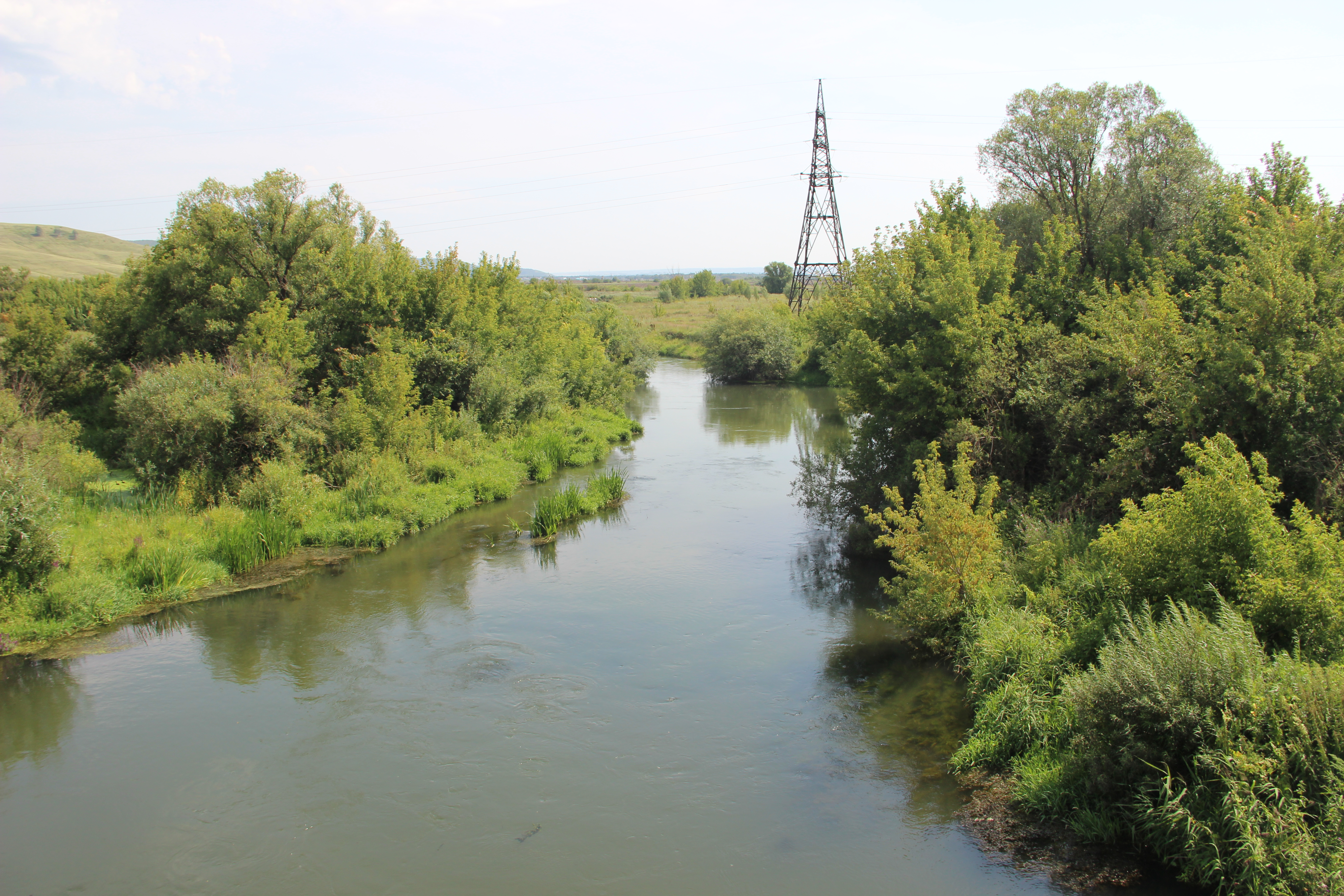

- Mouth of the Zay

Location
- Country: Russia

Physical characteristics
- Source
  - location: Mikhaylovka, Leninogorsky District, Russia
- Mouth: Kama
  - location: near Nizhnekamsk, Russia
  - coordinates: 55°35′28″N 51°39′49″E
  - elevation: 53 m (174 ft)
- Length: 219 km (136 mi)
- Basin size: 5,020 km^{2} (1,940 mi^{2})
- Discharge
  - average: 489 m^{3}/s (17,300 cu ft/s), maximum in 1979 near Staroye Palchikovo

Basin features
- Progression: Kama→ Volga→ Caspian Sea

The Zay (Russian: Зай; Tatar: Зәй) is a river in Russia, a left-bank tributary of the Kama. It is 219 kilometres (136 mi) long, and its drainage basin covers 5,020 square kilometres (1,940 mi^{2}). It begins near Mikhaylovka, Leninogorsky District, Tatarstan and falls to the Kama 7 kilometres (4 mi) south-west of Nizhnekamsk.

At its headwaters the river is named the Steppe Zay (Russian: Степной Зай, Stepnoy Zay, Tatar: Дала Зәе, Dala Zäye). The lower reach of the river after the confluence with Forest Zay River, 55 kilometres (34 mi), is named simply Zay. One of headstream Steppe Zay's tributaries is also named Zay. Other major tributaries are the Moshkara, Zay-Karatay, Ursala, Aktashka, and Shumyshka rivers.

The mineralization varies from 2000–3000 to 5000–8000 mg/L. Average sediment deposition at the river mouth per year is 130 millimetres (5.1 in). Drainage is regulated. There are two reservoirs, Zainsk and Karabash Reservoirs constructed in Zay valley. Since 1978 it is protected as a natural monument of Tatarstan. Zainsk, Almetyevsk and Karabash are located on the river.
