= Subkhankulovo =

Subkhankulovo Субханкулово
- Selo
- Location within Bashkortostan Location within Russia
- Coordinates: 54°33′N 53°48′E
- Country: Russia
- Region: Bashkortostan
- District: Tuymazinsky District
- Time zone: UTC+5:00

Subkhankulovo (Russian: Субханкулово; Bashkir: Собханғол, Sobxanğol) is a rural locality (a selo) and the administrative centre of Subkhankulovsky Selsoviet, Tuymazinsky District, Bashkortostan, Russia. The population was 5,598 as of 2010. There are 20 streets.

== Geography ==
Subkhankulovo is located 11 km southeast of Tuymazy (the district's administrative centre) by road. Staroye Subkhankulovo is the nearest rural locality.
