= Gabdrakhim Utyz Imyani =

- Габдерәхим Госман угылы Утыз-Имәни әл-Болгари
- Born: 1754
- Died: 1834 (aged 79–80)
- Citizenship: Russian Empire
- Occupation: poet

Gabdrakhim Utyz Imyani (Russian: Габдрахим Усман; Bashkir: Ғәбдерәхим әл-Болғари, Tatar: Габдерәхим Госман угылы Утыз-Имәни әл-Болгари; 1752–1836) was a Tatar poet. In the Islamic world he was also known as a scientist and recoverer of lost fragments of an ancient Quran (see Samarkand Kufic Quran).

== Legacy ==
In 2011, the district prosecutor's office in Gaisky, Orenburg Oblast, required to recognize extremist essay Abd al-Rahim Utyz Imyani "Pearl clarification".

== Bibliography ==
- Усман, Fәбдерәхим (1990). Башҡорт әҙәбиәте тарихы. Vol. 1.
- Идиятуллина, Г. (2002). "Духовно-религиозная атмосфера в Поволжье в XVII—XVIII вв". Ислам и мусульманская культура в Среднем Поволжье: история и современность. Очерки. Казань: Мастер Лайн.
- Кемпер М. Габдерахим аль-Булгари аль-Утыз-Имани // Ислам на территории бывшей Российской империи. Вып. 2.-М., 1999
- Кунафин, Гиниятулла Сафиуллович (2006). Культура Башкортостана и башкирская литература XIX — нач. ХХ вв. Уфа.
- Хусаинов, Гайса Батыргареевич (1997). "Утыҙ Имәни — Ғәбдрәхим Усман". Ватандаш (12).
- Хусаинов Г. Б. Башкирская литература XI—XVIII вв. Уфа: Гилем, 1996.
- Краткая литературная энциклопедия: В 9 т. — М.: Сов. Энцикл., 1962–1978.
- Габдрахим Усман.// История литературы Урала. Конец XIV—XVIII вв./ Гл. ред. В. В. Блажес, Е. К. Созина. М.: Языки славянской культуры, 2012. 608 с. — С.113—115.
- Хусаинов, Г. Б. "Усман Габдрахим аль-Булгари.". Башкирская энциклопедия. Уфа: Научное издательство.
