= Karabashevo =

Karabashevo Карабашево
- Selo
- Location within Bashkortostan Location within Russia
- Coordinates: 55°23′N 54°10′E
- Country: Russia
- Region: Bashkortostan
- District: Ilishevsky District
- Time zone: UTC+5:00

Karabashevo (Russian: Карабашево; Bashkir: Ҡарабаш, Qarabaş) is a rural locality (a selo) and the administrative centre of Karabashevsky Selsoviet, Ilishevsky District, Bashkortostan, Russia. The population was 613 as of 2010. There are 7 streets.

== Geography ==
Karabashevo is located 13 km southwest of Verkhneyarkeyevo (the district's administrative centre) by road. Ishteryakovo is the nearest rural locality.
