= Karabash Reservoir =

Reservoir in Tatarstan, Russia

- Location within Russia
- Location: Tatarstan
- Coordinates: 54°41′55″N 52°39′58″E
- Type: reservoir
- Basin countries: Russia
- Max. length: 8.7 km (5.4 mi)
- Surface area: 7.31 km^{2} (2.82 sq mi)
- Average depth: 7.2 m (24 ft)
- Water volume: 52.3×10^{6} m^{3} (42,400 acre⋅ft)
- Settlements: Karabash, Tatarstan

Karabash Reservoir (Russian: Карабашское водохранилище, Tatar: Карабаш сусаклагычы, romanized: Qarabaş susaqlağıçı) is a reservoir of the upper Zay River near Karabash, Tatarstan, Russian Federation. It was filled in 1957 for the local oil and other industry needs. It has surface area 7.31 km², a length 8.7 km, mean depth 7.2 m and a volume 52.3 million cubic meters.
