= Sukharevo =

Sukharevo (Russian: Сухарево) is the name of several rural localities in Russia:

- Sukharevo, Arkhangelsk Oblast, a village in Yemetsky Selsoviet of Kholmogorsky District of Arkhangelsk Oblast
- Sukharevo, Belgorod Oblast, a selo in Borchansky Rural Okrug of Valuysky District of Belgorod Oblast
- Sukharevo, Kostroma Oblast, a village in Petrovskoye Settlement of Chukhlomsky District of Kostroma Oblast
- Sukharevo, Mytishchinsky District, Moscow Oblast, a village in Fedoskinskoye Rural Settlement of Mytishchinsky District of Moscow Oblast
- Sukharevo, Ruzsky District, Moscow Oblast, a village in Staroruzskoye Rural Settlement of Ruzsky District of Moscow Oblast
- Sukharevo, Novgorod Oblast, a village in Gorskoye Settlement of Volotovsky District of Novgorod Oblast
- Sukharevo, Oryol Oblast, a village in Bortnovsky Selsoviet of Zalegoshchensky District of Oryol Oblast
- Sukharevo, Dedovichsky District, Pskov Oblast, a village in Dedovichsky District of Pskov Oblast
- Sukharevo, Dnovsky District, Pskov Oblast, a village in Dnovsky District of Pskov Oblast
- Sukharevo, Novorzhevsky District, Pskov Oblast, a village in Novorzhevsky District of Pskov Oblast
- Sukharevo, Ryazan Oblast, a village in Smoleyevsky Rural Okrug of Ukholovsky District of Ryazan Oblast
- Sukharevo, Republic of Tatarstan, a selo in Nizhnekamsky District of the Republic of Tatarstan
- Sukharevo, Tomsk Oblast, a village in Tomsky District of Tomsk Oblast
- Sukharevo, Tula Oblast, a village in Gvardeysky Rural Okrug of Dubensky District of Tula Oblast
- Sukharevo, Kalininsky District, Tver Oblast, a village in Turginovskoye Rural Settlement of Kalininsky District of Tver Oblast
- Sukharevo, Kalyazinsky District, Tver Oblast, a village in Nerlskoye Rural Settlement of Kalyazinsky District of Tver Oblast
- Sukharevo, Udmurt Republic, a village in Galanovsky Selsoviet of Karakulinsky District of the Udmurt Republic
- Sukharevo, Ust-Kubinsky District, Vologda Oblast, a village in Tomashsky Selsoviet of Ust-Kubinsky District of Vologda Oblast
- Sukharevo, Vashkinsky District, Vologda Oblast, a village in Kisnemsky Selsoviet of Vashkinsky District of Vologda Oblast
- Sukharevo, Danilovsky District, Yaroslavl Oblast, a village in Fedurinsky Rural Okrug of Danilovsky District of Yaroslavl Oblast
- Sukharevo, Yaroslavsky District, Yaroslavl Oblast, a village in Tolbukhinsky Rural Okrug of Yaroslavsky District of Yaroslavl Oblast
