= Karabash, Republic of Tatarstan =

Karabash Карабаш
- Urban-type settlement

Other transcription(s)
  - Tatar: Карабаш
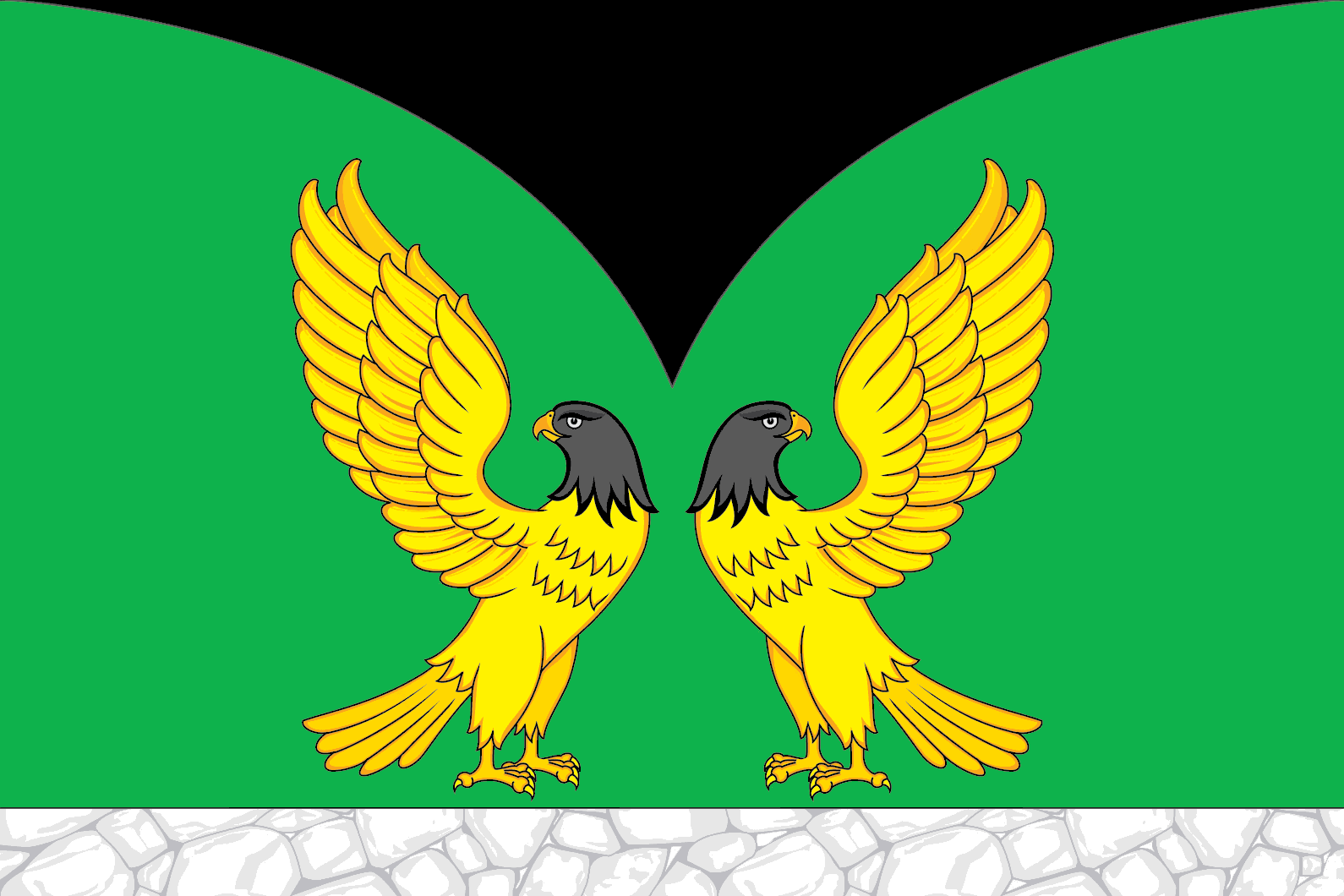
- Flag
- Interactive map of Karabash
- Location of Karabash Karabash (Tatarstan)
- Coordinates: 54°41′45″N 52°35′05″E
- Country: Russia
- Federal subject: Tatarstan
- Administrative district: Bugulminsky District
- Known since: 1664
- Urban-type settlement status since: 1957
- Elevation: 201 m (659 ft)

Population (2010 Census)
  - Total: 5,005
  - Estimate (2021): 4,704 (−6%)

Municipal status
  - Municipal district: Bugulminsky Municipal District
  - Urban settlement: Karabash Urban Settlement
  - Capital of: Karabash Urban Settlement
- Time zone: UTC+3 (MSK)
- Postal code: 423229
- OKTMO ID: 92617155051

Karabash (Russian: Карабаш; Tatar: Карабаш) is an urban locality (an urban-type settlement) in Bugulminsky District of the Republic of Tatarstan, Russia, located at the confluence of the Zay and Stepnoy Zay Rivers, 27 kilometers (17 mi) northwest of Bugulma, the administrative center of the district. As of the 2010 Census, its population was 5,005.

== History ==
It has been known since 1664 and was granted urban-type settlement status in 1957.

== Administrative and municipal status ==
Within the framework of administrative divisions, the urban-type settlement of Karabash is subordinated to Bugulminsky District. As a municipal division, Karabash, together with one rural locality (the village of Irken), is incorporated within Bugulminsky Municipal District as Karabash Urban Settlement.

== Economy and infrastructure ==
As of 1997, Irkenneft oil company was the main industrial enterprise in the settlement. Other facilities included a secondary school and a mosque. The Karabash Reservoir is located in the vicinity.

== Demographics ==
Karabash population
- 2010 Census: 5,005
- 2002 Census: 5,139
- 1989 Census: 4,272
- 1979 Census: 4,492

In 1989, ethnic Tatars accounted for 80.1% of the population, followed by the Russians at 14.1%, Chuvash at 2.3%, and Mordvins at 1.4%.
