= Leninogorsk, Russia =

Town in the Republic of Tatarstan, Russia

Leninogorsk Лениногорск
- Town

Other transcription(s)
  - Tatar: Лениногорск
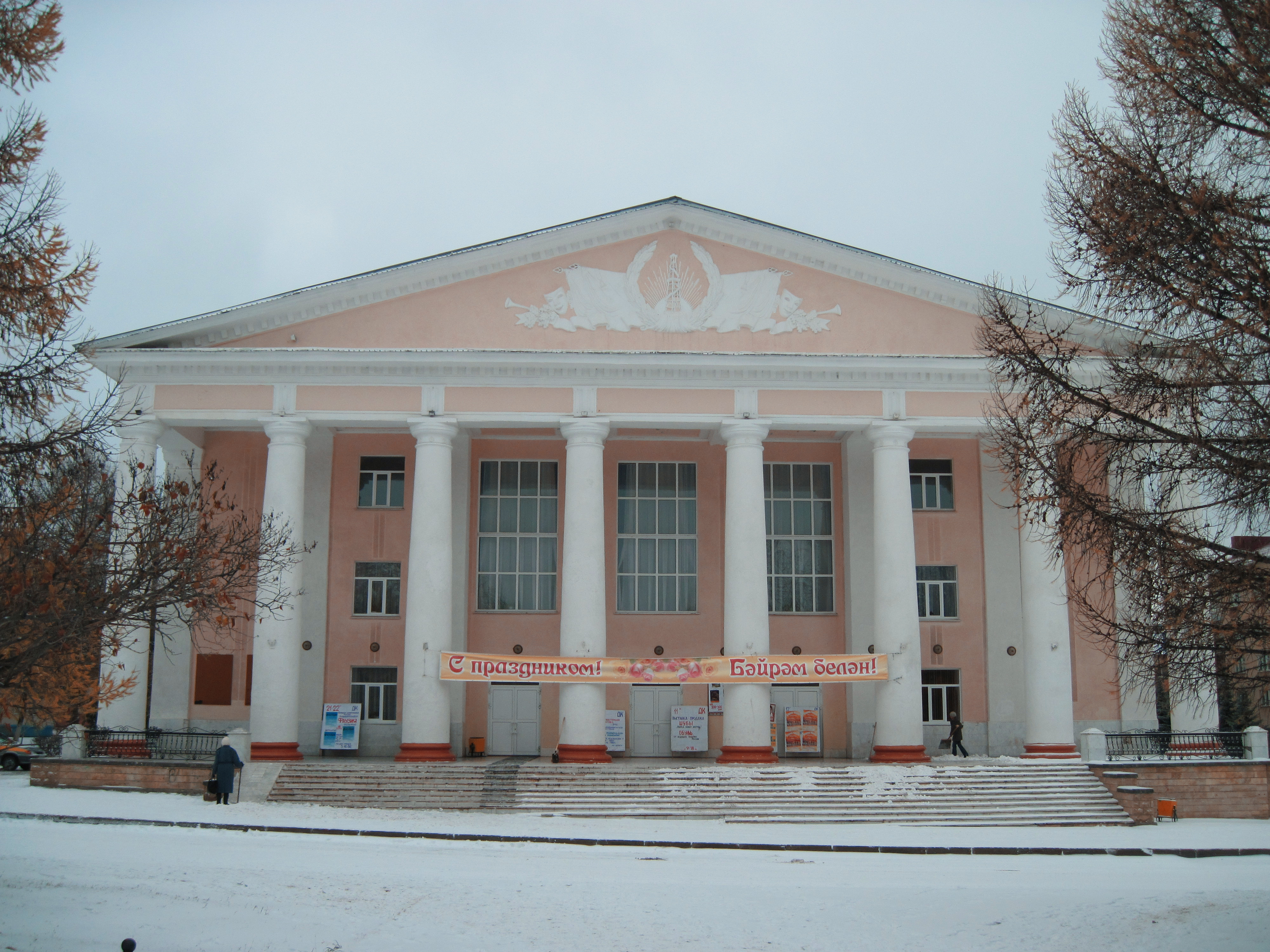
- House of Culture in Leninogorsk

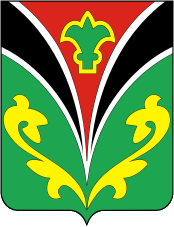
- Flag Coat of arms
- Interactive map of Leninogorsk
- Location of Leninogorsk Leninogorsk (Tatarstan)
- Coordinates: 54°36′N 52°30′E
- Country: Russia
- Federal subject: Tatarstan
- Founded: 1795
- Town status since: 1955
- Elevation: 251 m (823 ft)

Population (2010 Census)
  - Total: 64,127
  - Estimate (2025): 60,056 (−6.3%)
  - Rank: 246th in 2010

Administrative status
  - Subordinated to: town of republic significance of Leninogorsk
  - Capital of: town of republic significance of Leninogorsk, Leninogorsky District

Municipal status
  - Municipal district: Leninogorsky Municipal District
  - Urban settlement: Leninogorsk Urban Settlement
  - Capital of: Leninogorsky Municipal District, Leninogorsk Urban Settlement
- Time zone: UTC+3 (MSK)
- Postal codes: 423250, 423260
- Dialing code: +7 85595
- OKTMO ID: 92636101001

Leninogorsk (Russian: Лениного́рск; Tatar: Лениногорск) is a town in the Republic of Tatarstan, Russia, located 322 kilometers (200 mi) southeast of Kazan. Population: 64,127 (2010 census); 65,592 (2002 census); 62,093 (1989 Soviet census).

== Administrative and municipal status ==
Within the framework of administrative divisions, Leninogorsk serves as the administrative center of Leninogorsky District, even though it is not a part of it. As an administrative division, it is incorporated separately as the town of republic significance of Leninogorsk—an administrative unit with the status equal to that of the districts. As a municipal division, the town of republic significance of Leninogorsk is incorporated within Leninogorsky Municipal District as Leninogorsk Urban Settlement.

== Economy ==
Leninogorsk is important to the Russia's oil industry. The Romashkino Field located here in the Volga-Ural oil and gas region, also called the "Second Baku," is operated by Tatneft.

== Sources ==
- Министерство юстиции Республики Татарстан. Приказ №01-02/9 от 4 февраля 2014 г. «Об утверждении реестра административно-территориальных единиц и населённых пунктов в Республике Татарстан», в ред. Приказа №01-02/160 от 11 марта 2015 г. «О внесении изменений в Приказ Министерства юстиции Республики Татарстан от 04.02.2014 №01-02/9 "Об утверждении реестра административно-территориальных единиц и населённых пунктов в Республике Татарстан"». Опубликован: Официальный сайт правовой информации Министерства юстиции Республики Татарстан (http://pravo.tatarstan.ru), 27 февраля 2014 г. (Ministry of Justice of the Republic of Tatarstan. Order #01-02/9 of February 4, 2014 On the Adoption of the Registry of the Administrative-Territorial Units and Inhabited Localities in the Republic of Tatarstan, as amended by the Order #01-02/160 of March 11, 2015 On Amending the Order of the Ministry of Justice of the Republic of Tatarstan #01-02/9 of February 4, 2014 "On the Adoption of the Registry of the Administrative-Territorial Units and Inhabited Localities in the Republic of Tatarstan". ).
- Государственный Совет Республики Татарстан. Закон №34-ЗРТ от 31 января 2005 г. «Об установлении границ территорий и статусе муниципального образования "Лениногорский муниципальный район" и муниципальных образований в его составе», в ред. Закона №139-ЗРТ от 30 декабря 2014 г. «Об изменении границ территорий отдельных муниципальных образований и внесении изменений в Закон Республики Татарстан "Об установлении границ территорий и статусе муниципального образования "Лениногорский муниципальный район" и муниципальных образований в его составе"». Вступил в силу со дня официального опубликования. Опубликован: "Республика Татарстан", №№18–19, 1 февраля 2005 г. (State Council of the Republic of Tatarstan. Law #34-ZRT of January 31, 2005 On Establishing the Borders of the Territories and the Status of the Municipal Formation of "Leninogorsky Municipal District" and of the Municipal Formations It Comprises, as amended by the Law #139-ZRT of December 30, 2014 On Changing the Borders of the Territory of Several Municipal Formations and on Amending the Law of the Republic of Tatarstan "On Establishing the Borders of the Territories and the Status of the Municipal Formation of "Leninogorsky Municipal District" and of the Municipal Formations It Comprises". Effective as of the official publication date.).
