= Dubovaya =

Dubovaya Дубовая
- Village
- Location within Perm Krai Location within Russia
- Coordinates: 56°38′N 54°08′E
- Country: Russia
- Region: Perm Krai
- District: Chaykovsky
- Time zone: UTC+5:00

Dubovaya (Russian: Дубовая) is a rural locality (a village) in Chaykovsky, Perm Krai, Russia. The population was 77 as of 2010. There are 17 streets.

== Geography ==
Dubovaya is located 19 km south of Chaykovsky. Markovo is the nearest rural locality.
