= Markovo, Tchaykovsky, Perm Krai =

Markovo Марково
- Village
- Location within Perm Krai Location within Russia
- Coordinates: 56°38′N 54°05′E
- Country: Russia
- Region: Perm Krai
- District: Chaykovsky
- Time zone: UTC+5:00

Markovo (Russian: Марково) is a rural locality (a village) in Chaykovsky, Perm Krai, Russia. The population was 94 as of 2010. There are 20 streets.
