= Bormist =

Bormist Бормист
- Village
- Location within Perm Krai Location within Russia
- Coordinates: 56°44′N 54°49′E
- Country: Russia
- Region: Perm Krai
- District: Chaykovsky
- Time zone: UTC+5:00

Bormist (Russian: Бормист) is a rural locality (a village) in Chaykovsky, Perm Krai, Russia. The population was 119 as of 2010.

== Geography ==
Bormist is located 52 km east of Chaykovsky. Alnyash is the nearest rural locality.
