= Zipunovo =

Zipunovo Зипуново
- Selo
- Location within Perm Krai Location within Russia
- Coordinates: 56°36′N 54°30′E
- Country: Russia
- Region: Perm Krai
- District: Chaykovsky
- Time zone: UTC+5:00

Zipunovo (Russian: Зипуново) is a rural locality (a selo) and the administrative center of Zipunovskoye Rural Settlement, Chaykovsky, Perm Krai, Russia. The population was 568 as of 2010. There are 5 streets.

== Geography ==
Zipunovo is located 38 km southeast of Chaykovsky. Nekrasovo is the nearest rural locality.
