= Nizhnekamsk Hydroelectric Station =

Dam and power station in Naberezhnye Chelny, Tatarstan, Russia

Nizhnekamsk Dam
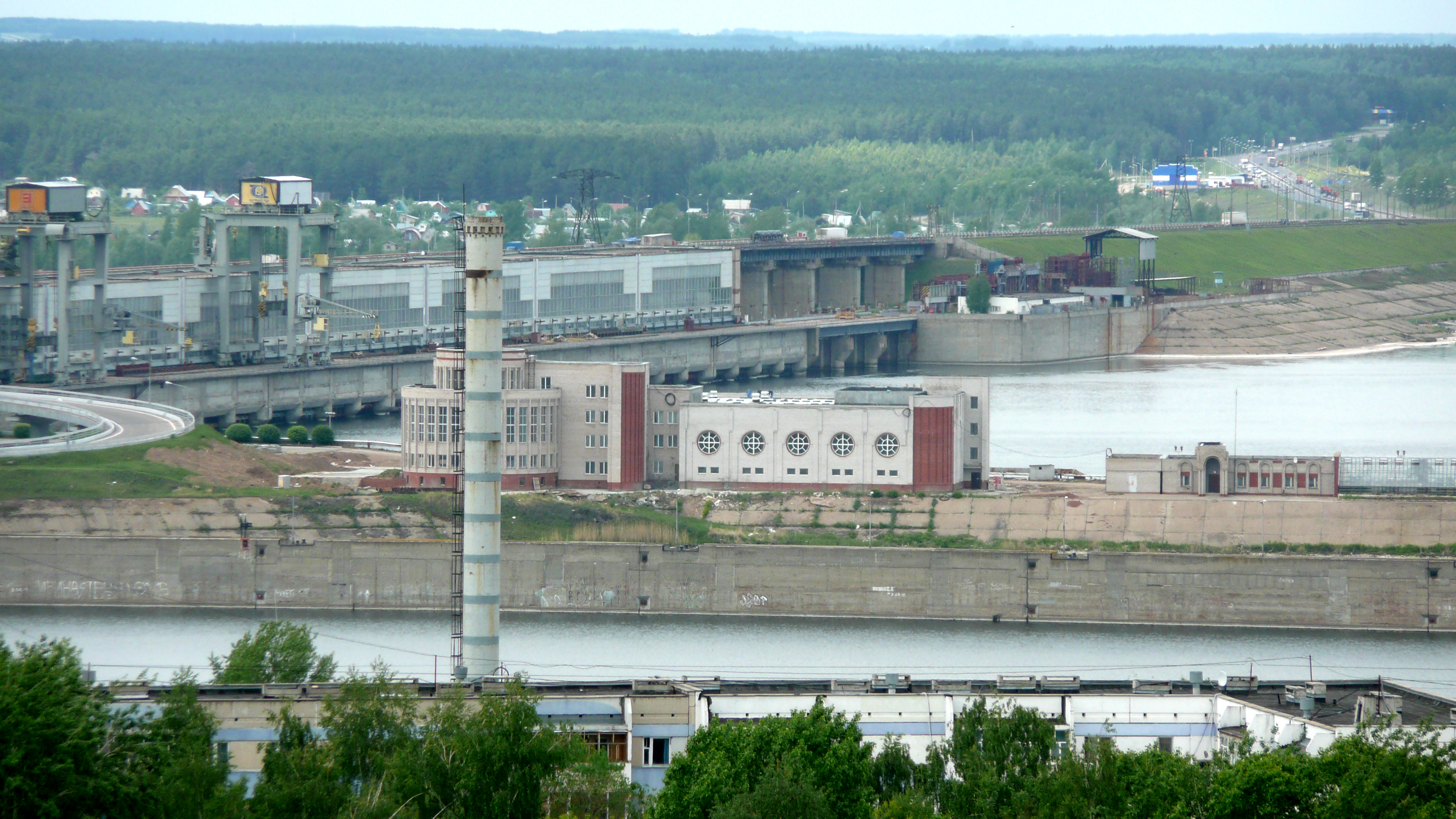
- The hydroelectric power plant

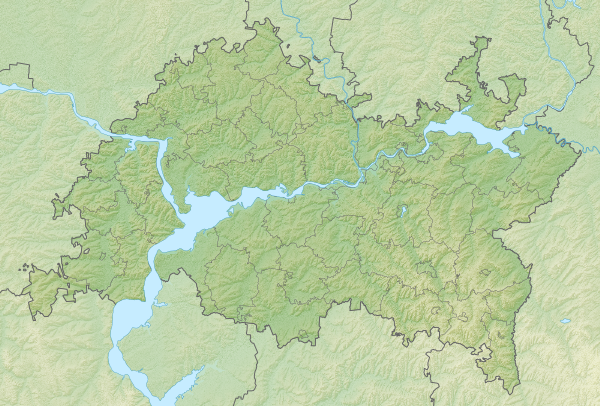
- Location within Tatarstan Location within Russia
- Official name: Nizhnekamsk Hydroelectric Plant
- Country: Russia
- Location: Naberezhnye Chelny, Tatarstan
- Coordinates: 55°41′58″N 52°16′42″E
- Status: In use
- Construction began: 1963

Dam and spillways
- Impounds: Kama River
- Height: 30 m (98 ft)
- Length: 3,900 m (12,795 ft)

Reservoir
- Creates: Nizhnekamsk Reservoir
- Total capacity: 2,800,000,000 m^{3} (2,269,997 acre⋅ft)
- Surface area: 1,084 km^{2} (419 sq mi)

Power Station
- Operator: Tatenergo
- Commission date: 1979-1987
- Hydraulic head: 12.4 m (41 ft)
- Turbines: 16 x 78 MW Kaplan turbines
- Installed capacity: 1,248 MW
- Annual generation: 2.54 billion kWh

The Nizhnekamsk Hydroelectric Station (Russian: Нижнекамская ГЭС), also known as Lower Kama, is a dam and hydroelectric power station on the lower Kama River near Naberezhnye Chelny in Russia. The purpose of the dam is power production, navigation and water supply. It powers a 1,248-megawatt (MW) station with 16 x 78 MW Kaplan turbine-generators. Work on the dam began in 1963 and was not completed until 1990. Work on the reservoir still continues to help maintain it.

== See also ==
- Votkinsk Hydroelectric Station
