= Votkinsk =

Town in the Udmurt Republic, Russia

Votkinsk Воткинск
- Town

Other transcription(s)
  - Udmurt: Вотка
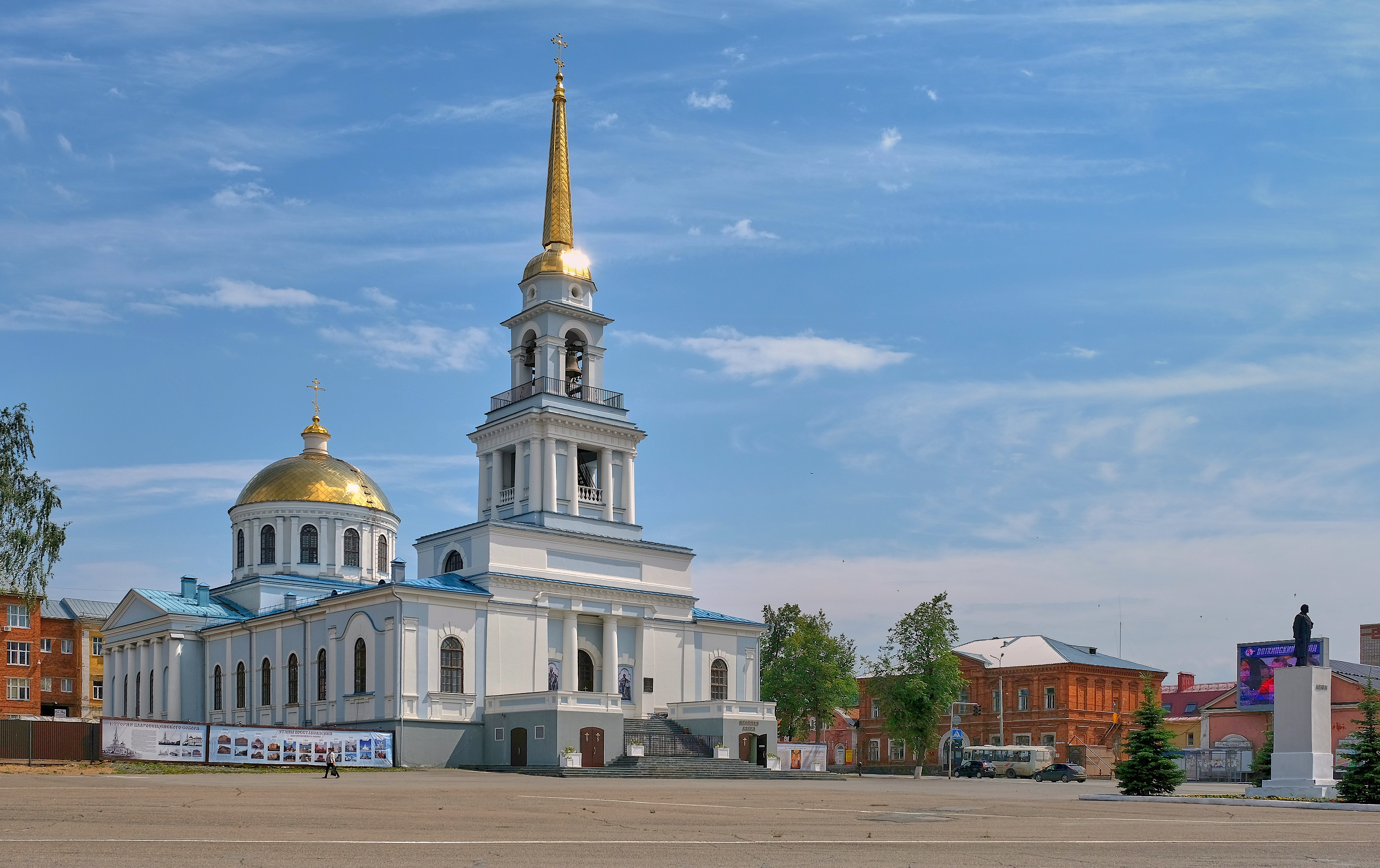
- Annunciation Cathedral, Votkinsk

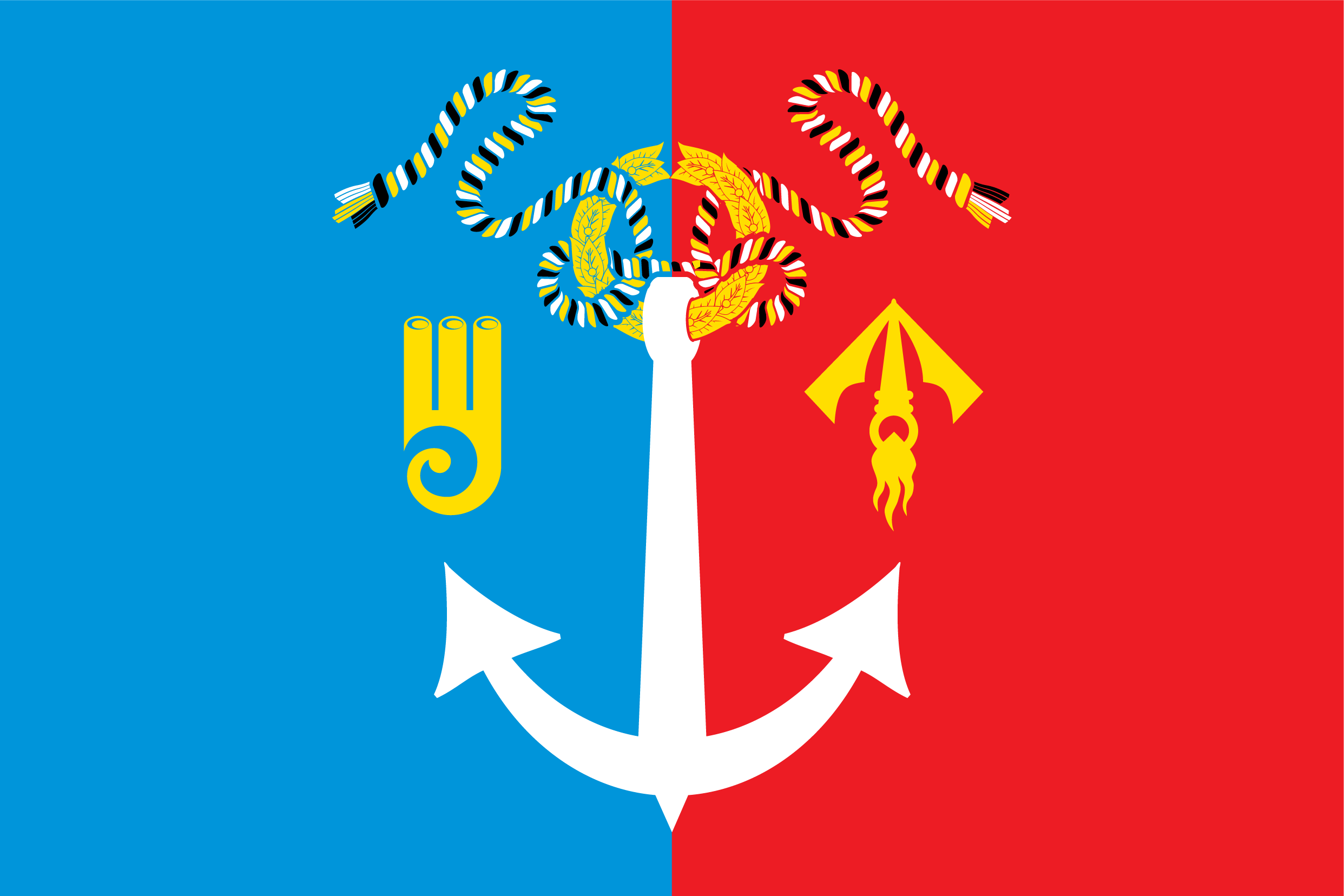
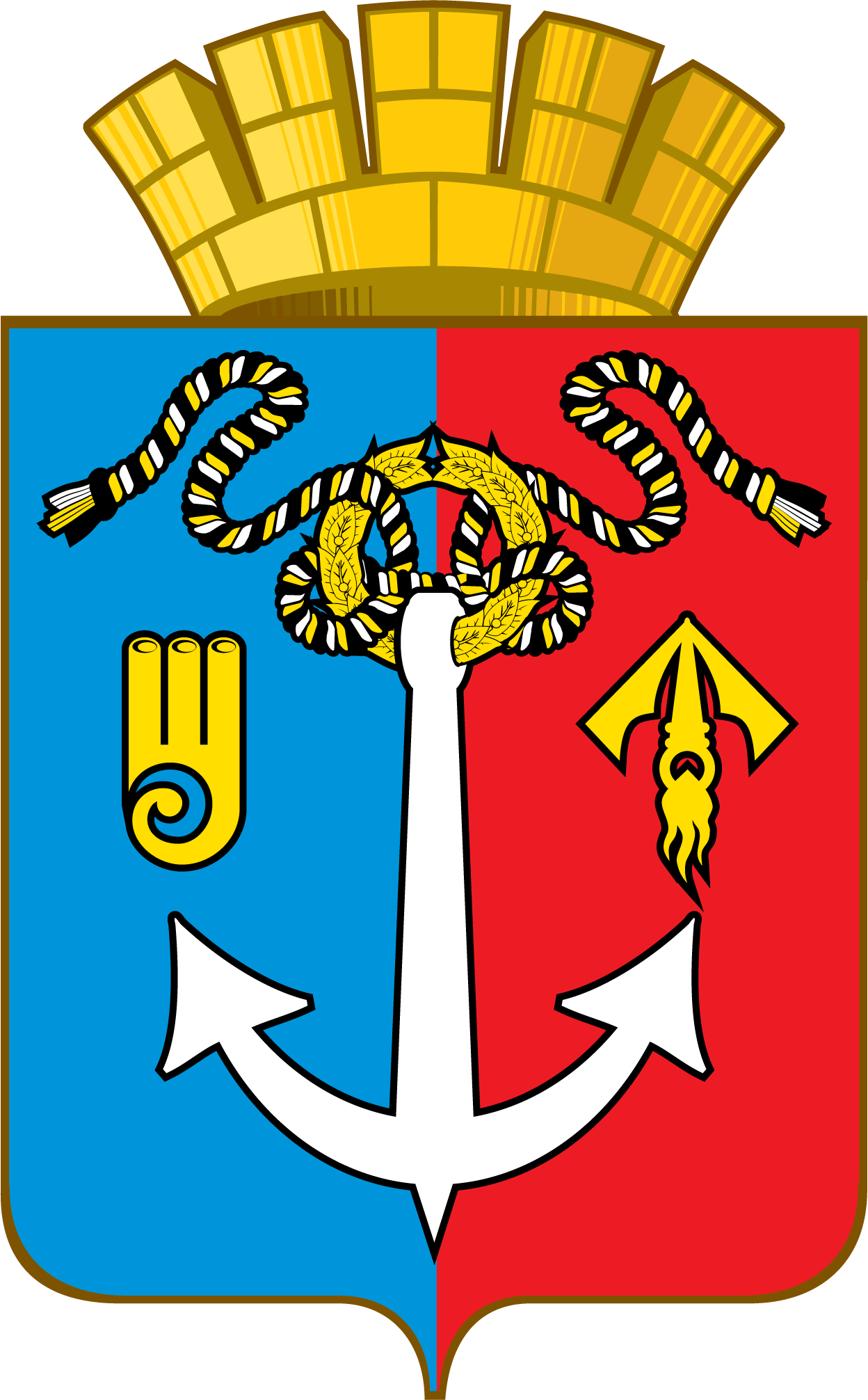
- Flag Coat of arms
- Interactive map of Votkinsk
- Location of Votkinsk Votkinsk (Udmurt Republic)
- Coordinates: 57°03′N 54°00′E
- Country: Russia
- Federal subject: Udmurtia
- Founded: 1759
- Town status since: 1935

Government
  - Head: Vladimir Perevozchikov
- Elevation: 108 m (354 ft)

Population (2010 Census)
  - Total: 99,022
  - Estimate (2025): 95,137 (−3.9%)
  - Rank: 168th in 2010

Administrative status
  - Subordinated to: town of republic significance of Votkinsk
  - Capital of: town of republic significance of Votkinsk, Votkinsky District

Municipal status
  - Urban okrug: Votkinsk Urban Okrug
  - Capital of: Votkinsk Urban Okrug, Votkinsky Municipal District
- Time zone: UTC+4 (MSK+1)
- Postal code: 427430-427459
- Dialing code: +7 34145
- OKTMO ID: 94710000001
- Website: votkinsk.ru

Votkinsk (/ˈvɒtkɪnsk/; Russian: Воткинск), also known as Votka (/ˈvɒtkə/; Udmurt: Вотка), is an industrial town in the Udmurt Republic, Russia. As of 2021, its population was 97,471.

== History ==
Votkinsk was established in 1759, initially as a center for metallurgical enterprises. It still has a major economic focus on these industries. It was officially granted town status in 1935.

It was one of the residence centers of the Udmurt Jews, who spoke Udmurt Yiddish.

The town is famous as the birthplace of composer Pyotr Ilyich Tchaikovsky, who was born there on May 7, 1840.

== Administrative and municipal status ==
Within the framework of administrative divisions, Votkinsk serves as the administrative center of Votkinsky District, even though it is not a part of it. As an administrative division, it is incorporated separately as the town of republic significance of Votkinsk—an administrative unit with the status equal to that of the districts. As a municipal division, the town of republic significance of Votkinsk is incorporated as Votkinsk Urban Okrug.

== Economy ==
The Moscow Institute of Thermal Technology operates a machine plant in the town, the Votkinsk Machine Building Plant, which produces some of Russia's long-range ballistic missiles. Under the Intermediate-Range Nuclear Forces Treaty (INF) concluded between the United States and the Soviet Union, the RSD-10 Pioneer missile production facility at Votkinsk was selected for long-term on-site monitoring by U.S. inspectors. The corresponding site for the Soviet Union in the United States was the Hercules missile production facility in Salt Lake City, Utah.

The town gives its name to the nearby Votkinsk Reservoir, filled in the 1960s following the construction of a dam for the Votkinsk Hydroelectric Station.

== Climate ==
Votkinsk has a warm summer continental climate, according to Koppen Dfb.

Climate data for Votkinsk, Udmurt
Month	Jan	Feb	Mar	Apr	May	Jun	Jul	Aug	Sep	Oct	Nov	Dec	Year
Mean daily maximum °C (°F)	−10.3 (13.5)	−8.2 (17.2)	−1.2 (29.8)	8.5 (47.3)	17.9 (64.2)	22.6 (72.7)	24.6 (76.3)	21.7 (71.1)	14.8 (58.6)	5.4 (41.7)	−2.2 (28.0)	−7.4 (18.7)	7.2 (44.9)
Daily mean °C (°F)	−14.2 (6.4)	−12.4 (9.7)	−5.7 (21.7)	3.9 (39.0)	11.9 (53.4)	16.6 (61.9)	18.9 (66.0)	16.3 (61.3)	10.3 (50.5)	2.4 (36.3)	−5 (23)	−10.9 (12.4)	2.7 (36.8)
Mean daily minimum °C (°F)	−18.0 (−0.4)	−16.6 (2.1)	−10.1 (13.8)	−.7 (30.7)	5.9 (42.6)	10.7 (51.3)	13.3 (55.9)	10.9 (51.6)	5.8 (42.4)	−.6 (30.9)	−7.8 (18.0)	−14.3 (6.3)	−1.8 (28.8)
Average precipitation mm (inches)	40 (1.6)	27 (1.1)	25 (1.0)	33 (1.3)	41 (1.6)	62 (2.4)	67 (2.6)	65 (2.6)	58 (2.3)	56 (2.2)	48 (1.9)	41 (1.6)	563 (22.2)
Source: https://en.climate-data.org/asia/russian-federation/udmurt-republic/votkinsk-1201/#climate-table

== Sports ==
The bandy team Znamya-Udmurtiya has played in the highest division, and nowadays play in the second highest, Russian Bandy Supreme League.

== Notable people ==
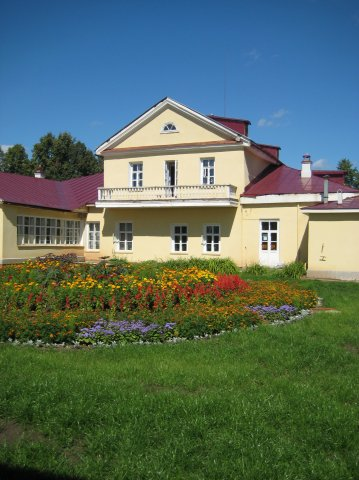
Inner courtyard of Tchaikovsky's Museum Estate

- Pyotr Ilyich Tchaikovsky (1840–1893), Russian composer
- Rudolf Povarnitsyn (born 1962), Ukrainian high jumper
- Ksenia Garanina (born 1997), Armenian footballer
- Liudmyla Kuchma (born 1940), wife of second Ukrainian President Leonid Kuchma, former First Lady of Ukraine (1994-2005)

== International relations ==
Votkinsk has one sister city, as designated by Sister Cities International:

- West Jordan, Utah, United States
