= List of cities and towns in Russia by population =

All Russian cities with at least one million residents, labelled

Federal subjects of Russia by population density

This is a list of cities and towns in Russia and parts of the Russian-occupied territories of Ukraine with a population of over 50,000 as of the 2021 census. The figures are for the population within the limits of the city/town proper, not the urban area or metropolitan area.

The list includes Sevastopol and settlements within the Republic of Crimea which are internationally recognized as part of Ukraine and were not subject to the 2010 census. Additionally, settlements within the Donetsk People's Republic, Kherson Oblast, Luhansk People's Republic, and Zaporozhye Oblast, are internationally recognized as part of Ukraine and were not subject to the 2010 census. Only settlements presently controlled by Russia are included; settlements under the control of Ukraine are not included. The city of Zelenograd (a part of the federal city of Moscow) and the municipal cities/towns of the federal city of St. Petersburg are also excluded, as they are not enumerated in the 2021 census as stand-alone localities. The sixteen largest cities (cities with over 1,000,000 inhabitants) have a total population of 35,509,177, or roughly 24.1% of the country's total population.

== Cities and towns ==
Cities in bold symbolize the capital city of its respective federal subject. Three capitals are too small to make the list: Naryan-Mar (pop. 25,795), Magas (pop. 15,279), and Anadyr (pop. 15,079). Pyatigorsk is the administrative centre of North Caucasian Federal District but not of any federal subject.

Cities in grey are in areas annexed by Russia that the international community considers illegally occupied by Russia. Only a few nations recognize Crimea, the Donetsk People's Republic, Kherson Oblast, Luhansk People's Republic, and Zaporozhye Oblast as part of Russia.

City or town	Russian name	Federal subject	Federal district	2021 census	2010 census	Change
**Moscow**	Москва	Moscow (federal city) (Note: The city of Moscow, though a separate entity from the surrounding Moscow Oblast, also serves as its capital)	Central	13,010,112	11,503,501	+13.10%
**Saint Petersburg**	Санкт-Петербург	Saint Petersburg (federal city) (Note: The city of Saint Petersburg, though a separate entity from the surrounding Leningrad Oblast, also serves as its capital)	Northwest	5,601,911	4,879,566	+14.80%
**Novosibirsk**	Новосибирск	Novosibirsk Oblast	Siberia	1,633,595	1,473,754	+10.85%
**Yekaterinburg**	Екатеринбург	Sverdlovsk Oblast	Ural	1,544,376	1,349,772	+14.42%
**Kazan**	Казань	Republic of Tatarstan	Volga	1,308,660	1,143,535	+14.44%
**Nizhny Novgorod**	Нижний Новгород	Nizhny Novgorod Oblast	Volga	1,228,199	1,250,619	−1.79%
**Chelyabinsk**	Челябинск	Chelyabinsk Oblast	Ural	1,189,525	1,130,132	+5.26%
**Krasnoyarsk**	Красноярск	Krasnoyarsk Krai	Siberia	1,187,771	973,826	+21.97%
**Samara**	Самара	Samara Oblast	Volga	1,173,299	1,164,685	+0.74%
**Ufa**	Уфа	Republic of Bashkortostan	Volga	1,144,809	1,062,319	+7.77%
**Rostov-on-Don**	Ростов-на-Дону	Rostov Oblast	South (Note: Includes Crimea, annexed by Russia in 2014; recognized as a part of Ukraine by most of the international community.)	1,142,162	1,089,261	+4.86%
**Omsk**	Омск	Omsk Oblast	Siberia	1,125,695	1,154,119	−2.46%
**Krasnodar**	Краснодар	Krasnodar Krai	South	1,099,344	744,995	+47.56%
**Voronezh**	Воронеж	Voronezh Oblast	Central	1,057,681	889,680	+18.88%
**Perm**	Пермь	Perm Krai	Volga	1,034,002	991,162	+4.32%
**Volgograd**	Волгоград	Volgograd Oblast	South	1,028,036	1,021,215	+0.67%
**Donetsk** (Note: Annexed by Russia in 2022; recognized as a part of Ukraine by most of the international community. Census figure is from the 2001 Ukrainian Census, and a 2022 estimate is used instead of the 2021 census.)	Донецк	Donetsk People's Republic	South	901,645	1,024,678	−12.01%
**Saratov**	Саратов	Saratov Oblast	Volga	901,361	837,900	+7.57%
**Tyumen**	Тюмень	Tyumen Oblast	Ural	847,488	581,907	+45.64%
Tolyatti	Тольятти	Samara Oblast	Volga	684,709	719,632	−4.85%
**Barnaul**	Барнаул	Altai Krai	Siberia	630,877	612,401	+3.02%
**Izhevsk**	Ижевск	Udmurt Republic	Volga	623,472	627,734	−0.68%
**Makhachkala**	Махачкала	Republic of Dagestan	North Caucasus	623,254	572,076	+8.95%
**Khabarovsk**	Хабаровск	Khabarovsk Krai	Far East	617,441	577,441	+6.93%
**Ulyanovsk**	Ульяновск	Ulyanovsk Oblast	Volga	617,352	614,786	+0.42%
**Irkutsk**	Иркутск	Irkutsk Oblast	Siberia	617,264	587,891	+5.00%
**Vladivostok**	Владивосток	Primorsky Krai	Far East	603,519	592,034	+1.94%
**Yaroslavl**	Ярославль	Yaroslavl Oblast	Central	577,279	591,486	−2.40%
**Kemerovo**	Кемерово	Kemerovo Oblast	Siberia	557,119	532,981	+4.53%
**Tomsk**	Томск	Tomsk Oblast	Siberia	556,478	524,669	+6.06%
Naberezhnye Chelny	Набережные Челны	Republic of Tatarstan	Volga	548,434	513,193	+6.87%
**Sevastopol** (Note: Annexed by Russia in 2014; recognized as a part of Ukraine by most of the international community. Census figure is from the 2001 Ukrainian Census.)	Севастополь	Sevastopol (federal city)	South	547,820	342,451	+59.97%
**Stavropol**	Ставрополь	Stavropol Krai	North Caucasus	547,443	398,539	+37.36%
**Orenburg**	Оренбург	Orenburg Oblast	Volga	543,654	548,331	−0.85%
Novokuznetsk	Новокузнецк	Kemerovo Oblast	Siberia	537,480	547,904	−1.90%
**Ryazan**	Рязань	Ryazan Oblast	Central	528,599	524,927	+0.70%
Balashikha	Балашиха	Moscow Oblast	Central	520,962	215,494	+141.75%
**Penza**	Пенза	Penza Oblast	Volga	501,109	517,311	−3.13%
**Cheboksary**	Чебоксары	Chuvash Republic	Volga	497,807	453,721	+9.72%
**Lipetsk**	Липецк	Lipetsk Oblast	Central	496,403	508,887	−2.45%
**Kaliningrad**	Калининград	Kaliningrad Oblast	Northwest	490,449	431,902	+13.56%
**Astrakhan**	Астрахань	Astrakhan Oblast	South	475,629	520,339	−8.59%
**Tula**	Тула	Tula Oblast	Central	473,622	501,169	−5.50%
**Kirov**	Киров	Kirov Oblast	Volga	468,212	473,695	−1.16%
Sochi	Сочи	Krasnodar Krai	South	466,078	343,334	+35.75%
**Kursk**	Курск	Kursk Oblast	Central	440,052	415,159	+6.00%
Mariupol	Мариуполь	Donetsk People's Republic	South	425,681	510,835	−16.67%
**Ulan-Ude**	Улан-Удэ	Republic of Buryatia	Far East	437,565	404,426	+8.19%
**Tver**	Тверь	Tver Oblast	Central	416,219	403,606	+3.13%
Magnitogorsk	Магнитогорск	Chelyabinsk Oblast	Ural	410,594	407,775	+0.69%
**Lugansk** (Note: Annexed by Russia in 2022; recognized as a part of Ukraine by most of the international community. Census figure is from the 2001 Ukrainian Census, and a 2022 estimate is used instead of the 2021 census.)	Луганск	Luhansk People's Republic	South	425,681	459,294	−7.32%
Surgut	Сургут	Khanty-Mansi Autonomous Okrug-Yugra	Ural	396,443	306,675	+29.27%
**Bryansk**	Брянск	Bryansk Oblast	Central	379,152	415,721	−8.80%
**Ivanovo**	Иваново	Ivanovo Oblast	Central	361,644	408,330	−11.43%
**Yakutsk**	Якутск	Sakha (Yakutia) Republic	Far East	355,443	269,601	+31.84%
**Vladimir**	Владимир	Vladimir Oblast	Central	349,951	345,373	+1.33%
**Simferopol**	Симферопoль	Republic of Crimea	South	340,540	343,644	−0.90%
**Belgorod**	Белгород	Belgorod Oblast	Central	339,978	356,402	−4.61%
Makeyevka	Макеевка	Donetsk People's Republic	South	338,968	387,609	−12.55%
Nizhny Tagil	Нижний Тагил	Sverdlovsk Oblast	Ural	338,966	361,811	−6.31%
**Kaluga**	Калуга	Kaluga Oblast	Central	337,058	324,698	+3.81%
**Chita**	Чита	Zabaykalsky Krai	Far East	334,427	324,444	+3.08%
**Grozny**	Грозный	Chechen Republic	North Caucasus	328,533	271,573	+20.97%
Volzhsky	Волжский	Volgograd Oblast	South	321,479	314,255	+2.30%
**Smolensk**	Смоленск	Smolensk Oblast	Central	316,570	326,861	−3.15%
Podolsk	Подольск	Moscow Oblast	Central	314,934	187,961	+67.55%
**Saransk**	Саранск	Republic of Mordovia	Volga	314,871	297,415	+5.87%
**Vologda**	Вологда	Vologda Oblast	Northwest	313,944	301,755	+4.04%
**Kurgan**	Курган	Kurgan Oblast	Ural	310,911	333,606	−6.80%
Cherepovets	Череповец	Vologda Oblast	Northwest	305,185	312,310	−2.28%
**Oryol**	Орёл	Oryol Oblast	Central	303,169	317,747	−4.59%
**Arkhangelsk**	Архангельск	Arkhangelsk Oblast	Northwest	301,199	348,783	−13.64%
**Vladikavkaz**	Владикавказ	Republic of North Ossetia-Alania	North Caucasus	295,830	311,693	−5.09%
Nizhnevartovsk	Нижневартовск	Khanty-Mansi Autonomous Okrug-Yugra	Ural	283,256	251,694	+12.54%
**Yoshkar-Ola**	Йошкар-Ола	Mari El Republic	Volga	281,248	248,782	+13.05%
Sterlitamak	Стерлитамак	Republic of Bashkortostan	Volga	277,410	273,486	+1.43%
**Murmansk**	Мурманск	Murmansk Oblast	Northwest	270,384	307,257	−12.00%
**Kostroma**	Кострома	Kostroma Oblast	Central	267,481	268,742	−0.47%
Novorossiysk	Новороссийск	Krasnodar Krai	South	262,293	241,952	+8.41%
**Tambov**	Тамбов	Tambov Oblast	Central	261,803	280,161	−6.55%
Khimki	Химки	Moscow Oblast	Central	257,128	207,425	+23.96%
Mytishchi	Мытищи	Moscow Oblast	Central	255,429	173,160	+47.51%
**Nalchik**	Нальчик	Kabardino-Balkar Republic	North Caucasus	247,054	240,203	+2.85%
Taganrog	Таганрог	Rostov Oblast	South	245,120	257,681	−4.87%
Nizhnekamsk	Нижнекамск	Republic of Tatarstan	Volga	241,479	234,044	+3.18%
**Blagoveshchensk**	Благовещенск	Amur Oblast	Far East	241,437	214,390	+12.62%
Gorlovka	Горловка	Donetsk People's Republic	South	239,828	289,872	−17.26%
Komsomolsk-on-Amur	Комсомольск-на-Амуре	Khabarovsk Krai	Far East	238,505	263,906	−9.63%
**Petrozavodsk**	Петрозаводск	Republic of Karelia	Northwest	234,897	261,987	−10.34%
Korolyov	Королёв	Moscow Oblast	Central	228,095	183,402	+24.37%
Shakhty	Шахты	Rostov Oblast	South	226,452	239,987	−5.64%
Engels	Энгельс	Saratov Oblast	Volga	225,428	202,419	+11.37%
**Veliky Novgorod**	Великий Новгород	Novgorod Oblast	Northwest	224,286	218,717	+2.55%
Lyubertsy	Люберцы	Moscow Oblast	Central	224,195	172,525	+29.95%
Bratsk	Братск	Irkutsk Oblast	Siberia	224,071	246,319	−9.03%
Stary Oskol	Старый Оскол	Belgorod Oblast	Central	221,676	221,085	+0.27%
Angarsk	Ангарск	Irkutsk Oblast	Siberia	221,296	233,567	−5.25%
**Syktyvkar**	Сыктывкар	Komi Republic	Northwest	220,580	235,006	−6.14%
Dzerzhinsk	Дзержинск	Nizhny Novgorod Oblast	Volga	218,630	240,742	−9.18%
**Pskov**	Псков	Pskov Oblast	Northwest	193,082	203,279	−5.02%
Orsk	Орск	Orenburg Oblast	Volga	189,195	239,800	−21.10%
Krasnogorsk	Красногорск	Moscow Oblast	Central	187,634	116,896	+60.51%
Armavir	Армавир	Krasnodar Krai	South	187,177	188,832	−0.88%
**Abakan**	Абакан	Republic of Khakassia	Siberia	184,769	165,214	+11.84%
Balakovo	Балаково	Saratov Oblast	Volga	184,466	199,690	−7.62%
Biysk	Бийск	Altai Krai	Siberia	183,852	210,115	−12.50%
**Yuzhno-Sakhalinsk**	Южно-Сахалинск	Sakhalin Oblast	Far East	181,587	181,728	−0.08%
Odintsovo	Одинцово	Moscow Oblast	Central	180,530	138,930	+29.94%
Ussuriysk	Уссурийск	Primorsky Krai	Far East	180,393	158,004	+14.17%
Prokopyevsk	Прокопьевск	Kemerovo Oblast	Siberia	177,819	210,130	−15.38%
Rybinsk	Рыбинск	Yaroslavl Oblast	Central	177,295	200,771	−11.69%
Norilsk	Норильск	Krasnoyarsk Krai	Siberia	174,453	175,365	−0.52%
Volgodonsk	Волгодонск	Rostov Oblast	South	168,048	170,841	−1.63%
Syzran	Сызрань	Samara Oblast	Volga	165,725	178,750	−7.29%
**Petropavlovsk-Kamchatsky**	Петропавловск-Камчатский	Kamchatka Krai	Far East	164,900	179,780	−8.28%
Kamensk-Uralsky	Каменск-Уральский	Sverdlovsk Oblast	Ural	164,192	174,689	−6.01%
Novocherkassk	Новочеркасск	Rostov Oblast	South	163,674	168,746	−3.01%
Almetyevsk	Альметьевск	Republic of Tatarstan	Volga	163,512	146,393	+11.69%
Zlatoust	Златоуст	Chelyabinsk Oblast	Ural	161,774	174,962	−7.54%
Severodvinsk	Северодвинск	Arkhangelsk Oblast	Northwest	157,213	192,353	−18.27%
Khasavyurt	Хасавюрт	Republic of Dagestan	North Caucasus	155,144	131,187	+18.26%
Kerch	Керчь	Republic of Crimea	South	154,621	157,007	−1.52%
Domodedovo	Домодедово	Moscow Oblast	Central	152,404	96,145	+58.51%
**Melitopol** (Note: Annexed by Russia in 2022; recognized as a part of Ukraine by most of the international community. Census figure is from the 2001 Ukrainian Census, and a 2022 estimate is used instead of the 2021 census.)	Мелитополь	Zaporozhye Oblast	South	148,851	160,352	−7.17%
Salavat	Салават	Republic of Bashkortostan	Volga	148,575	156,095	−4.82%
Miass	Миасс	Chelyabinsk Oblast	Ural	147,995	151,751	−2.48%
Kopeysk	Копейск	Chelyabinsk Oblast	Ural	147,806	137,601	+7.42%
Pyatigorsk	Пятигорск	Stavropol Krai	North Caucasus	146,473	142,511	+2.78%
Elektrostal	Электросталь	Moscow Oblast	Central	146,403	155,196	−5.67%
**Maykop**	Майкоп	Republic of Adygea	South	143,385	144,249	−0.60%
Nakhodka	Находка	Primorsky Krai	Far East	139,931	159,719	−12.39%
Berezniki	Березники	Perm Krai	Volga	138,069	156,466	−11.76%
Kolomna	Коломна	Moscow Oblast	Central	134,850	144,589	−6.74%
Shchyolkovo	Щёлково	Moscow Oblast	Central	134,211	110,411	+21.56%
Serpukhov	Серпухов	Moscow Oblast	Central	133,793	127,041	+5.31%
Kovrov	Ковров	Vladimir Oblast	Central	132,417	145,214	−8.81%
Neftekamsk	Нефтекамск	Republic of Bashkortostan	Volga	131,942	121,733	+8.39%
Kislovodsk	Кисловодск	Stavropol Krai	North Caucasus	127,521	128,553	−0.80%
Bataysk	Батайск	Rostov Oblast	South	126,988	111,843	+13.54%
Rubtsovsk	Рубцовск	Altai Krai	Siberia	126,834	147,002	−13.72%
Obninsk	Обнинск	Kaluga Oblast	Central	125,376	104,739	+19.70%
**Kyzyl**	Кызыл	Tuva Republic	Siberia	125,241	109,918	+13.94%
Derbent	Дербент	Republic of Dagestan	North Caucasus	124,953	119,200	+4.83%
Nefteyugansk	Нефтеюганск	Khanty-Mansi Autonomous Okrug-Yugra	Ural	124,732	122,855	+1.53%
Nazran	Назрань	Republic of Ingushetia	North Caucasus	122,350	93,335	+31.09%
Kaspiysk	Каспийск	Republic of Dagestan	North Caucasus	121,140	100,129	+20.98%
Dolgoprudny	Долгопрудный	Moscow Oblast	Central	120,907	90,956	+32.93%
Novocheboksarsk	Новочебоксарск	Chuvash Republic	Volga	120,375	124,097	−3.00%
Novomoskovsk	Новомосковск	Tula Oblast	Central	119,697	131,386	−8.90%
Yessentuki	Ессентуки	Stavropol Krai	North Caucasus	119,658	100,996	+18.48%
Nevinnomyssk	Невинномысск	Stavropol Krai	North Caucasus	117,562	118,360	−0.67%
Oktyabrsky	Октябрьский	Republic of Bashkortostan	Volga	115,557	109,474	+5.56%
Ramenskoye	Раменское	Moscow Oblast	Central	114,537	96,317	+18.92%
Pervouralsk	Первоуральск	Sverdlovsk Oblast	Ural	114,450	124,528	−8.09%
Mikhaylovsk	Михайловск	Stavropol Krai	North Caucasus	114,133	70,981	+60.79%
Reutov	Реутов	Moscow Oblast	Central	113,871	87,314	+30.42%
**Cherkessk**	Черкесск	Karachay-Cherkess Republic	North Caucasus	113,226	129,069	−12.27%
Zhukovsky	Жуковский	Moscow Oblast	Central	111,222	104,736	+6.19%
Dimitrovgrad	Димитровград	Ulyanovsk Oblast	Volga	110,968	122,580	−9.47%
Pushkino	Пушкино	Moscow Oblast	Central	110,868	102,874	+7.77%
Artyom	Артём	Primorsky Krai	Far East	109,556	102,603	+6.78%
Kamyshin	Камышин	Volgograd Oblast	South	107,927	119,565	−9.73%
Yevpatoriya	Евпатория	Republic of Crimea	South	107,877	105,915	+1.85%
Murom	Муром	Vladimir Oblast	Central	107,497	116,075	−7.39%
**Khanty-Mansiysk**	Ханты-Мансийск	Khanty-Mansi Autonomous Okrug-Yugra	Ural	107,473	80,151	+34.09%
Novy Urengoy	Новый Уренгой	Yamalo-Nenets Autonomous Okrug	Ural	107,251	104,107	+3.02%
Seversk	Северск	Tomsk Oblast	Siberia	106,648	108,590	−1.79%
Berdyansk	Бердянск	Zaporozhye Oblast	South	106,311	121,759	−12.69%
Alchevsk	Алчевск	Luhansk People's Republic	South	106,062	118,611	−10.58%
Orekhovo-Zuyevo	Орехово-Зуево	Moscow Oblast	Central	105,745	120,670	−12.37%
Arzamas	Арзамас	Nizhny Novgorod Oblast	Volga	104,908	106,362	−1.37%
Noginsk	Ногинск	Moscow Oblast	Central	103,891	100,072	+3.82%
Novoshakhtinsk	Новошахтинск	Rostov Oblast	South	103,480	111,075	−6.84%
Berdsk	Бердск	Novosibirsk Oblast	Siberia	102,850	97,296	+5.71%
**Elista**	Элиста	Republic of Kalmykia	South	102,583	103,749	−1.12%
Sergiyev Posad	Сергиев Посад	Moscow Oblast	Central	101,756	111,179	−8.48%
Vidnoye	Видное	Moscow Oblast	Central	101,490	56,752	+78.83%
Achinsk	Ачинск	Krasnoyarsk Krai	Siberia	100,621	109,155	−7.82%
Tobolsk	Тобольск	Tyumen Oblast	Ural	100,352	99,694	+0.66%
Noyabrsk	Ноябрьск	Yamalo-Nenets Autonomous Okrug	Ural	100,188	110,620	−9.43%
Yelets	Елец	Lipetsk Oblast	Central	99,875	108,404	−7.87%
Zelenodolsk	Зеленодольск	Republic of Tatarstan	Volga	99,137	97,674	+1.50%
Severodonetsk	Северодонецк	Luhansk People's Republic	South	99,036	119,940	−17.43%
Novokuybyshevsk	Новокуйбышевск	Samara Oblast	Volga	98,306	108,438	−9.34%
Votkinsk	Воткинск	Udmurt Republic	Volga	97,471	99,022	−1.57%
Zheleznogorsk	Железногорск	Kursk Oblast	Central	97,038	95,049	+2.09%
Mezhdurechensk	Междуреченск	Kemerovo Oblast	Siberia	96,174	101,678	−5.41%
Voskresensk	Воскресенск	Moscow Oblast	Central	95,495	91,464	+4.41%
Gatchina	Гатчина	Leningrad Oblast	Northwest	94,377	92,937	+1.55%
Serov	Серов	Sverdlovsk Oblast	Ural	94,211	99,373	−5.19%
Sarov	Саров	Nizhny Novgorod Oblast	Volga	93,357	92,047	+1.42%
Lisichansk	Лисичанск	Luhansk People's Republic	South	93,340	115,299	−19.05%
Leninsk-Kuznetsky	Ленинск-Кузнецкий	Kemerovo Oblast	Siberia	92,244	101,666	−9.27%
Sarapul	Сарапул	Udmurt Republic	Volga	91,115	101,381	−10.13%
**Magadan**	Магадан	Magadan Oblast	Far East	90,757	95,982	−5.44%
Michurinsk	Мичуринск	Tambov Oblast	Central	90,451	98,758	−8.41%
Solikamsk	Соликамск	Perm Krai	Volga	89,473	97,384	−8.12%
Murino	Мурино	Leningrad Oblast	Northwest	89,083	7,949	+1,020.68%
Chekhov	Чехов	Moscow Oblast	Central	89,025	60,720	+46.62%
Klin	Клин	Moscow Oblast	Central	88,511	80,585	+9.84%
Buzuluk	Бузулук	Orenburg Oblast	Volga	88,341	82,904	+6.56%
Glazov	Глазов	Udmurt Republic	Volga	87,762	95,854	−8.44%
Kansk	Канск	Krasnoyarsk Krai	Siberia	86,816	94,226	−7.86%
Velikiye Luki	Великие Луки	Pskov Oblast	Northwest	86,711	98,778	−12.22%
Kamensk-Shakhtinsky	Каменск-Шахтинский	Rostov Oblast	South	86,365	95,296	−9.37%
Gubkin	Губкин	Belgorod Oblast	Central	85,225	88,560	−3.77%
Kiselyovsk	Киселёвск	Kemerovo Oblast	Siberia	83,431	98,365	−15.18%
Yeysk	Ейск	Krasnodar Krai	South	82,943	87,769	−5.50%
Ivanteyevka	Ивантеевка	Moscow Oblast	Central	82,827	58,626	+41.28%
Lobnya	Лобня	Moscow Oblast	Central	82,764	74,252	+11.46%
Zheleznogorsk	Железногорск	Krasnoyarsk Krai	Siberia	82,723	84,795	−2.44%
Azov	Азов	Rostov Oblast	South	81,924	82,937	−1.22%
Anapa	Анапа	Krasnodar Krai	South	81,863	58,990	+38.77%
Bugulma	Бугульма	Republic of Tatarstan	Volga	81,677	89,204	−8.44%
Gelendzhik	Геленджик	Krasnodar Krai	South	80,204	54,980	+45.88%
Ukhta	Ухта	Komi Republic	Northwest	79,899	99,591	−19.77%
Yurga	Юрга	Kemerovo Oblast	Siberia	79,693	81,533	−2.26%
Ust-Ilimsk	Усть-Илимск	Irkutsk Oblast	Siberia	79,570	86,610	−8.13%
Krasny Luch	Красный Луч	Luhansk People's Republic	South	79,533	94,756	−16.07%
Vsevolozhsk	Всеволожск	Leningrad Oblast	Northwest	79,038	59,704	+32.38%
Novouralsk	Новоуральск	Sverdlovsk Oblast	Ural	78,479	85,522	−8.24%
Kuznetsk	Кузнецк	Penza Oblast	Volga	78,390	88,839	−11.76%
Bor	Бор	Nizhny Novgorod Oblast	Volga	78,372	78,058	+0.40%
Kineshma	Кинешма	Ivanovo Oblast	Central	77,694	88,164	−11.88%
Ozyorsk	Озёрск	Chelyabinsk Oblast	Ural	76,896	82,164	−6.41%
Yenakiyevo	Енакиево	Donetsk People's Republic	South	76,673	104,266	−26.46%
Novotroitsk	Новотроицк	Orenburg Oblast	Volga	75,960	98,173	−22.63%
Kropotkin	Кропоткин	Krasnodar Krai	South	75,858	80,765	−6.08%
Chaykovsky	Чайковский	Perm Krai	Volga	75,837	82,895	−8.51%
Chernogorsk	Черногорск	Republic of Khakassia	Siberia	75,745	72,147	+4.99%
Usolye-Sibirskoye	Усолье-Сибирское	Irkutsk Oblast	Siberia	74,762	83,327	−10.28%
Yalta	Ялта	Republic of Crimea	South	74,652	81,654	−8.58%
Dubna	Дубна	Moscow Oblast	Central	74,183	70,663	+4.98%
Balashov	Балашов	Saratov Oblast	Volga	74,057	82,227	−9.94%
Yelabuga	Елабуга	Republic of Tatarstan	Volga	73,630	70,728	+4.10%
Stakhanov	Стаханов	Luhansk People's Republic	South	73,248	90,144	−18.74%
Novoaltaysk	Новоалтайск	Altai Krai	Siberia	73,049	70,437	+3.71%
Vyborg	Выборг	Leningrad Oblast	Northwest	72,530	79,962	−9.29%
Yegoryevsk	Егорьевск	Moscow Oblast	Central	71,686	70,081	+2.29%
Verkhnyaya Pyshma	Верхняя Пышма	Sverdlovsk Oblast	Ural	71,335	59,749	+19.39%
Naro-Fominsk	Наро-Фоминск	Moscow Oblast	Central	71,121	64,665	+9.98%
Bakhmut	Бахмут	Donetsk People's Republic	South	71,094	82,916	−14.26%
Mineralnye Vody	Минеральные Воды	Stavropol Krai	North Caucasus	70,485	76,728	−8.14%
Troitsk	Троицк	Chelyabinsk Oblast	Ural	70,301	78,372	−10.30%
Chapayevsk	Чапаевск	Samara Oblast	Volga	70,228	72,692	−3.39%
Minusinsk	Минусинск	Krasnoyarsk Krai	Siberia	70,089	71,170	−1.52%
**Birobidzhan**	Биробиджан	Jewish Autonomous Oblast	Far East	70,064	75,413	−7.09%
Shadrinsk	Шадринск	Kurgan Oblast	Ural	68,609	77,756	−11.76%
Belovo	Белово	Kemerovo Oblast	Siberia	68,542	76,764	−10.71%
Tuymazy	Туймазы	Republic of Bashkortostan	Volga	68,349	66,836	+2.26%
Sertolovo	Сертолово	Leningrad Oblast	Northwest	68,241	47,457	+43.80%
Buynaksk	Буйнакск	Republic of Dagestan	North Caucasus	68,121	62,623	+8.78%
Ishim	Ишим	Tyumen Oblast	Ural	67,614	65,243	+3.63%
Kirovo-Chepetsk	Кирово-Чепецк	Kirov Oblast	Volga	66,651	80,921	−17.63%
Anzhero-Sudzhensk	Анжеро-Судженск	Kemerovo Oblast	Siberia	66,583	76,646	−13.13%
Feodosiya	Феодосия	Republic of Crimea	South	66,293	74,669	−11.22%
Dmitrov	Дмитров	Moscow Oblast	Central	65,574	61,305	+6.96%
Sosnovy Bor	Сосновый Бор	Leningrad Oblast	Northwest	65,367	65,788	−0.64%
**Gorno-Altaysk**	Горно-Алтайск	Altai Republic	Siberia	65,342	56,933	+14.77%
Lytkarino	Лыткарино	Moscow Oblast	Central	65,212	55,237	+18.06%
Pavlovsky Posad	Павловский Посад	Moscow Oblast	Central	65,098	63,711	+2.18%
Beloretsk	Белорецк	Republic of Bashkortostan	Volga	64,525	68,806	−6.22%
Stupino	Ступино	Moscow Oblast	Central	64,412	66,816	−3.60%
Gudermes	Гудермес	Chechen Republic	North Caucasus	64,376	45,631	+41.08%
Ishimbay	Ишимбай	Republic of Bashkortostan	Volga	64,041	66,259	−3.35%
Donskoy	Донской	Tula Oblast	Central	63,837	64,552	−1.11%
Kotelniki	Котельники	Moscow Oblast	Central	63,728	32,338	+97.07%
Kstovo	Кстово	Nizhny Novgorod Oblast	Volga	63,646	66,657	−4.52%
Urus-Martan	Урус-Мартан	Chechen Republic	North Caucasus	63,449	49,070	+29.30%
Georgiyevsk	Георгиевск	Stavropol Krai	North Caucasus	63,221	72,153	−12.38%
Klintsy	Клинцы	Bryansk Oblast	Central	63,059	62,510	+0.88%
Nyagan	Нягань	Khanty-Mansi Autonomous Okrug-Yugra	Ural	63,034	54,890	+14.84%
Slavyansk-na-Kubani	Славянск-на-Кубани	Krasnodar Krai	South	62,985	63,842	−1.34%
Kungur	Кунгур	Perm Krai	Volga	62,673	66,074	−5.15%
Sunzha	Сунжа	Republic of Ingushetia	North Caucasus	62,078	61,598	+0.78%
Tuapse	Туапсе	Krasnodar Krai	South	61,571	63,292	−2.72%
Kogalym	Когалым	Khanty-Mansi Autonomous Okrug-Yugra	Ural	61,441	58,181	+5.60%
Belogorsk	Белогорск	Amur Oblast	Far East	61,440	68,249	−9.98%
Leninogorsk	Лениногорск	Republic of Tatarstan	Volga	60,993	64,127	−4.89%
Rossosh	Россошь	Voronezh Oblast	Central	60,879	62,865	−3.16%
Aleksin	Алексин	Tula Oblast	Central	60,842	61,732	−1.44%
Borisoglebsk	Борисоглебск	Voronezh Oblast	Central	60,687	65,585	−7.47%
Fryazino	Фрязино	Moscow Oblast	Central	60,580	55,369	+9.41%
Gukovo	Гуково	Rostov Oblast	South	60,361	67,278	−10.28%
Revda	Ревда	Sverdlovsk Oblast	Ural	60,200	61,875	−2.71%
Prokhladny	Прохладный	Kabardino-Balkar Republic	North Caucasus	59,938	59,601	+0.57%
Beryozovsky	Берёзовский	Sverdlovsk Oblast	Ural	59,698	51,651	+15.58%
Belebey	Белебей	Republic of Bashkortostan	Volga	59,195	60,188	−1.65%
Chistopol	Чистополь	Republic of Tatarstan	Volga	58,815	60,755	−3.19%
Zarechny	Заречный	Penza Oblast	Volga	58,510	63,601	−8.00%
Budyonnovsk	Будённовск	Stavropol Krai	North Caucasus	58,103	64,624	−10.09%
Kumertau	Кумертау	Republic of Bashkortostan	Volga	57,949	62,851	−7.80%
Salsk	Сальск	Rostov Oblast	South	57,937	61,316	−5.51%
Dzerzhinsky	Дзержинский	Moscow Oblast	Central	57,918	47,163	+22.80%
Labinsk	Лабинск	Krasnodar Krai	South	57,428	62,864	−8.65%
Asbest	Асбест	Sverdlovsk Oblast	Ural	57,317	68,893	−16.80%
Iskitim	Искитим	Novosibirsk Oblast	Siberia	57,147	60,078	−4.88%
Pavlovo	Павлово	Nizhny Novgorod Oblast	Volga	57,116	60,698	−5.90%
Alexandrov	Александров	Vladimir Oblast	Central	57,053	61,551	−7.31%
Vorkuta	Воркута	Komi Republic	Northwest	56,985	70,548	−19.23%
Sibay	Сибай	Republic of Bashkortostan	Volga	56,514	62,763	−9.96%
Meleuz	Мелеуз	Republic of Bashkortostan	Volga	56,505	61,390	−7.96%
Kotlas	Котлас	Arkhangelsk Oblast	Northwest	56,093	60,562	−7.38%
Mikhaylovka	Михайловка	Volgograd Oblast	South	56,031	59,132	−5.24%
Izberbash	Избербаш	Republic of Dagestan	North Caucasus	55,996	55,646	+0.63%
Krasnoturyinsk	Краснотурьинск	Sverdlovsk Oblast	Ural	55,875	59,633	−6.30%
Belorechensk	Белореченск	Krasnodar Krai	South	55,870	53,892	+3.67%
Rzhev	Ржев	Tver Oblast	Central	55,757	61,982	−10.04%
Lesosibirsk	Лесосибирск	Krasnoyarsk Krai	Siberia	55,730	61,139	−8.85%
Tikhoretsk	Тихорецк	Krasnodar Krai	South	55,686	61,823	−9.93%
Tikhvin	Тихвин	Leningrad Oblast	Northwest	55,415	58,459	−5.21%
Rubezhnoye	Рубежное	Luhansk People's Republic	South	55,247	65,564	−15.74%
Shuya	Шуя	Ivanovo Oblast	Central	55,225	58,486	−5.58%
Polevskoy	Полевской	Sverdlovsk Oblast	Ural	55,182	64,220	−14.07%
Shchyokino	Щёкино	Tula Oblast	Central	55,109	58,139	−5.21%
Shali	Шали	Chechen Republic	North Caucasus	55,054	47,708	+15.40%
Volsk	Вольск	Saratov Oblast	Volga	55,035	66,508	−17.25%
Krymsk	Крымск	Krasnodar Krai	South	54,597	57,382	−4.85%
Zelenogorsk	Зеленогорск	Krasnoyarsk Krai	Siberia	54,279	66,056	−17.83%
Liski	Лиски	Voronezh Oblast	Central	54,147	55,864	−3.07%
Lysva	Лысьва	Perm Krai	Volga	53,855	65,918	−18.30%
Neryungri	Нерюнгри	Sakha (Yakutia) Republic	Far East	53,409	61,747	−13.50%
Volzhsk	Волжск	Mari El Republic	Volga	53,013	55,659	−4.75%
Energodar	Энергодар	Zaporozhye Oblast	South	52,237	56,180	−7.02%
Vyazma	Вязьма	Smolensk Oblast	Central	51,950	57,101	−9.02%
Timashyovsk	Тимашёвск	Krasnodar Krai	South	51,858	53,924	−3.83%
Gus-Khrustalny	Гусь-Хрустальный	Vladimir Oblast	Central	51,552	60,784	−15.19%
Krasnokamensk	Краснокаменск	Zabaykalsky Krai	Far East	51,137	55,666	−8.14%
Kirishi	Кириши	Leningrad Oblast	Northwest	51,028	52,309	−2.45%
Snezhinsk	Снежинск	Chelyabinsk Oblast	Ural	50,619	48,810	+3.71%
Zhigulyovsk	Жигулёвск	Samara Oblast	Volga	50,466	55,565	−9.18%

== Gallery ==
Largest cities of Russia
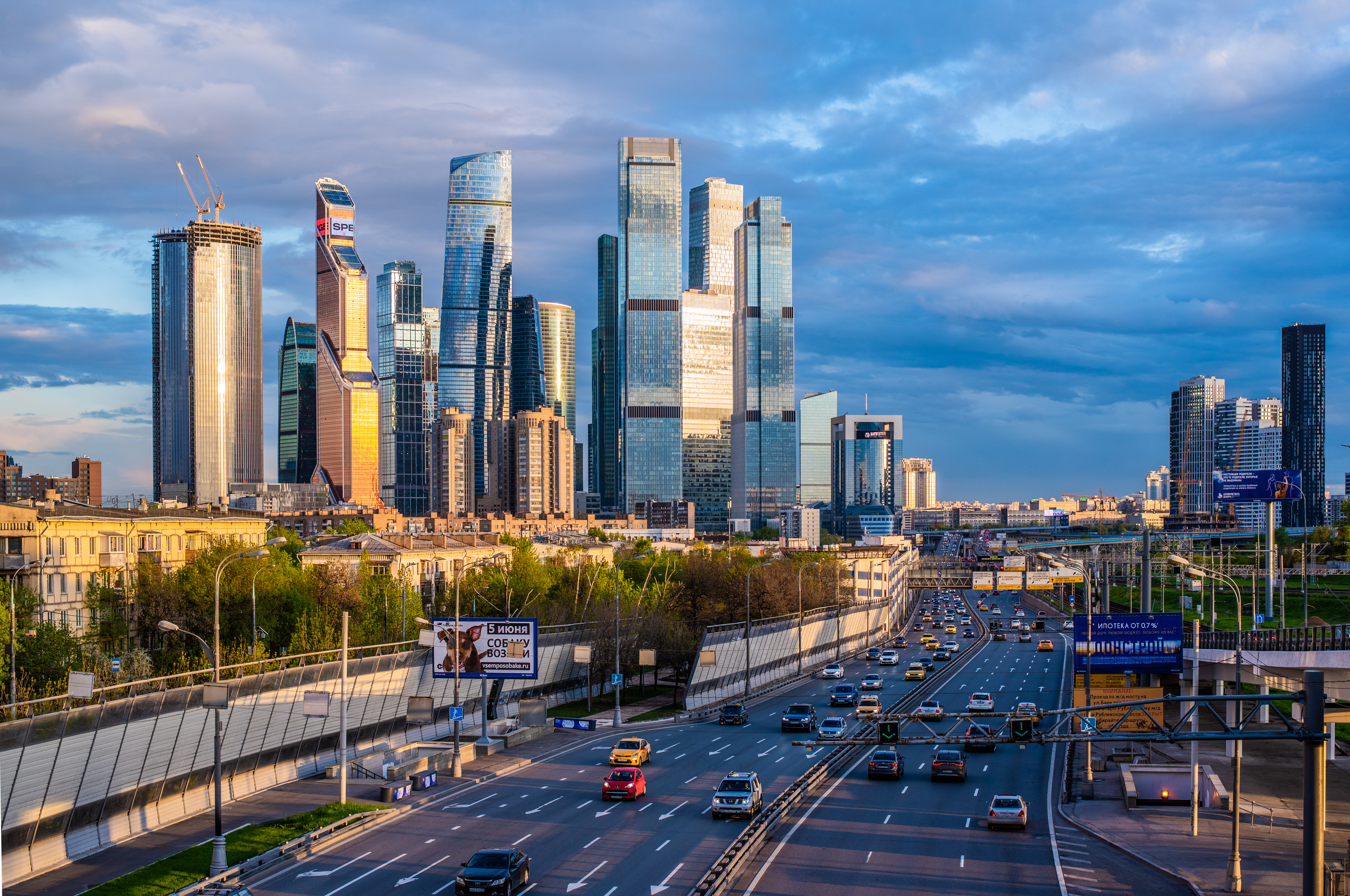
Moscow, the capital of Russia, is the largest city in Europe.

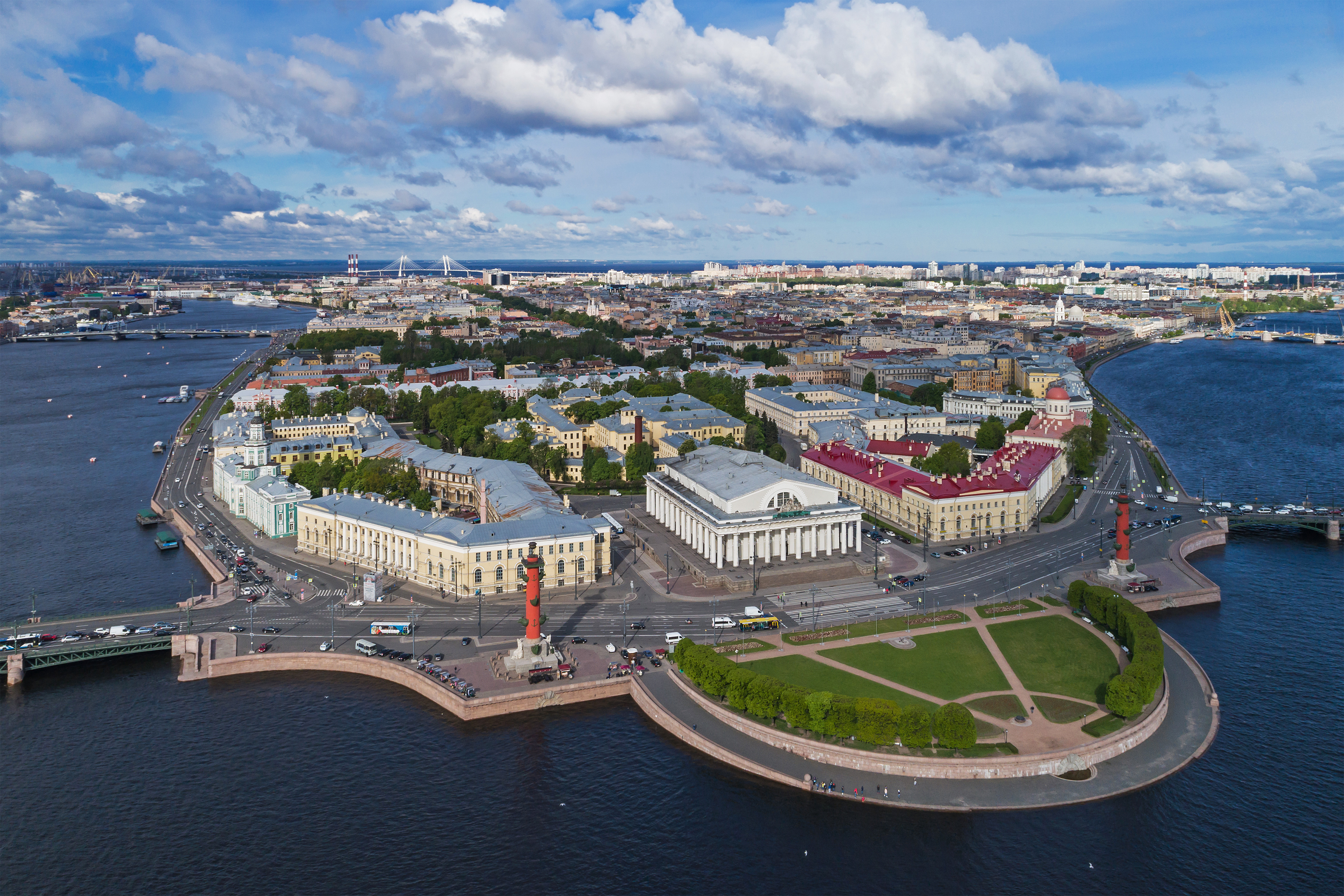
Saint Petersburg, the cultural capital of the country

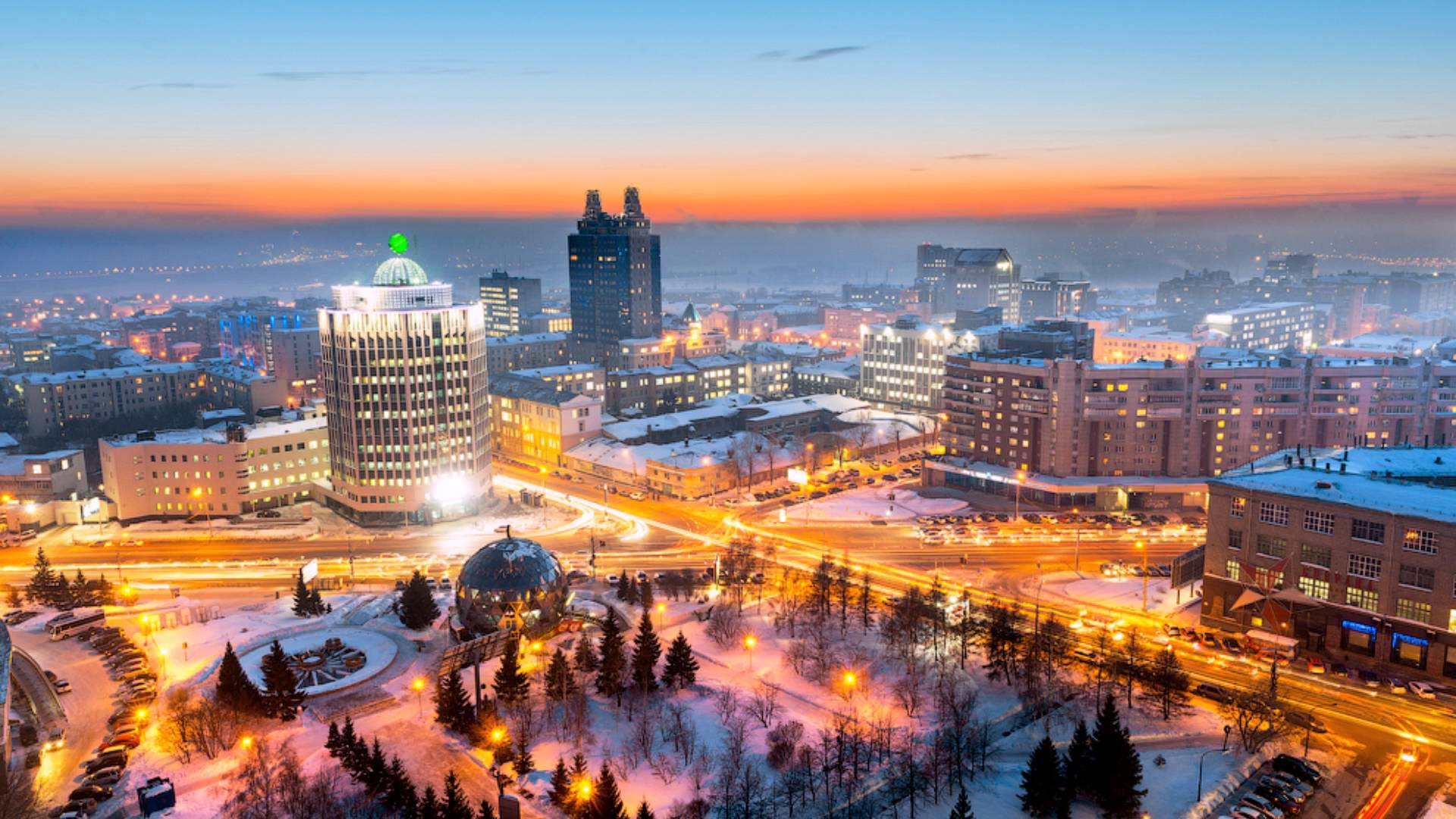
Novosibirsk, the largest city in Siberia

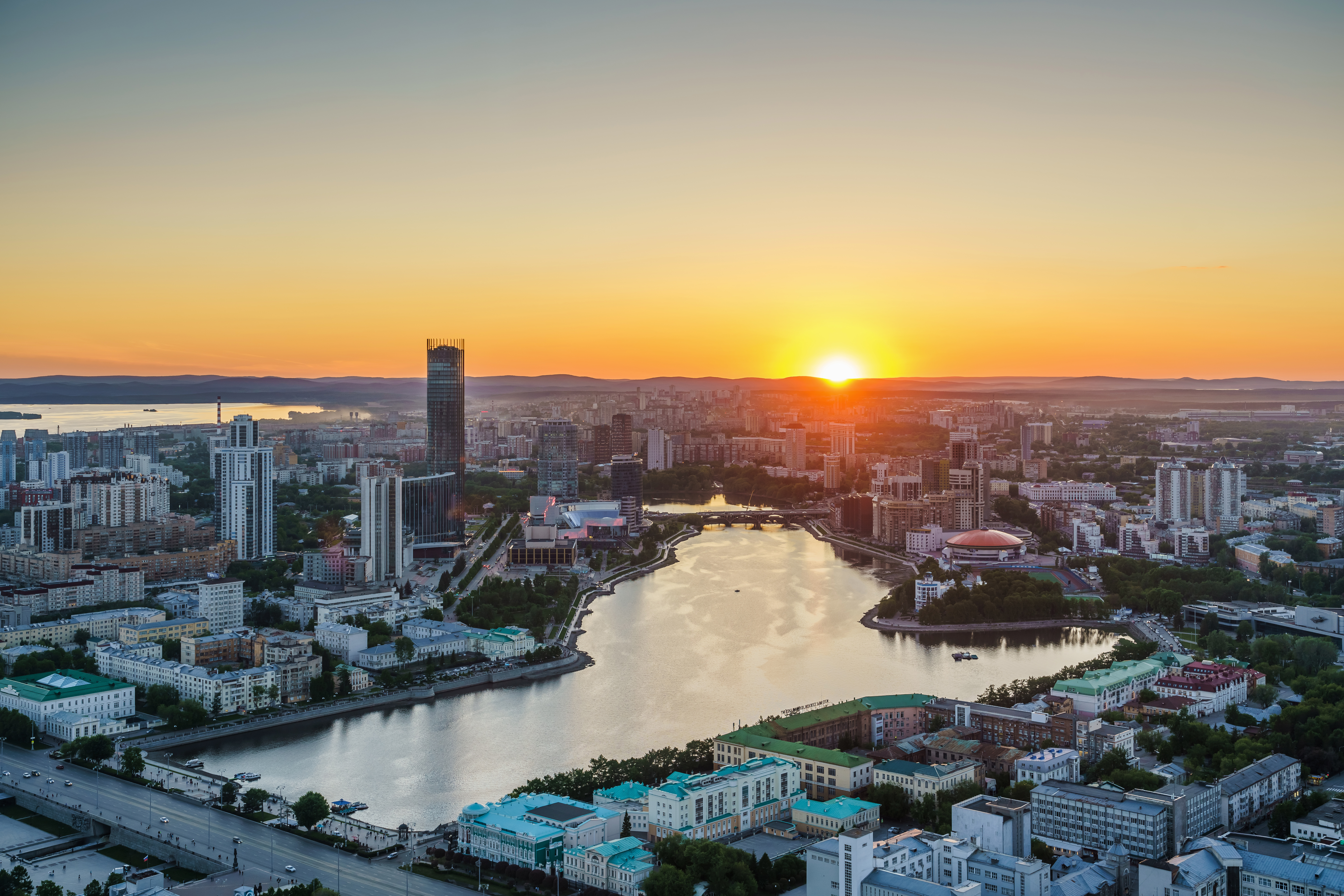
Yekaterinburg, the largest city in the Urals

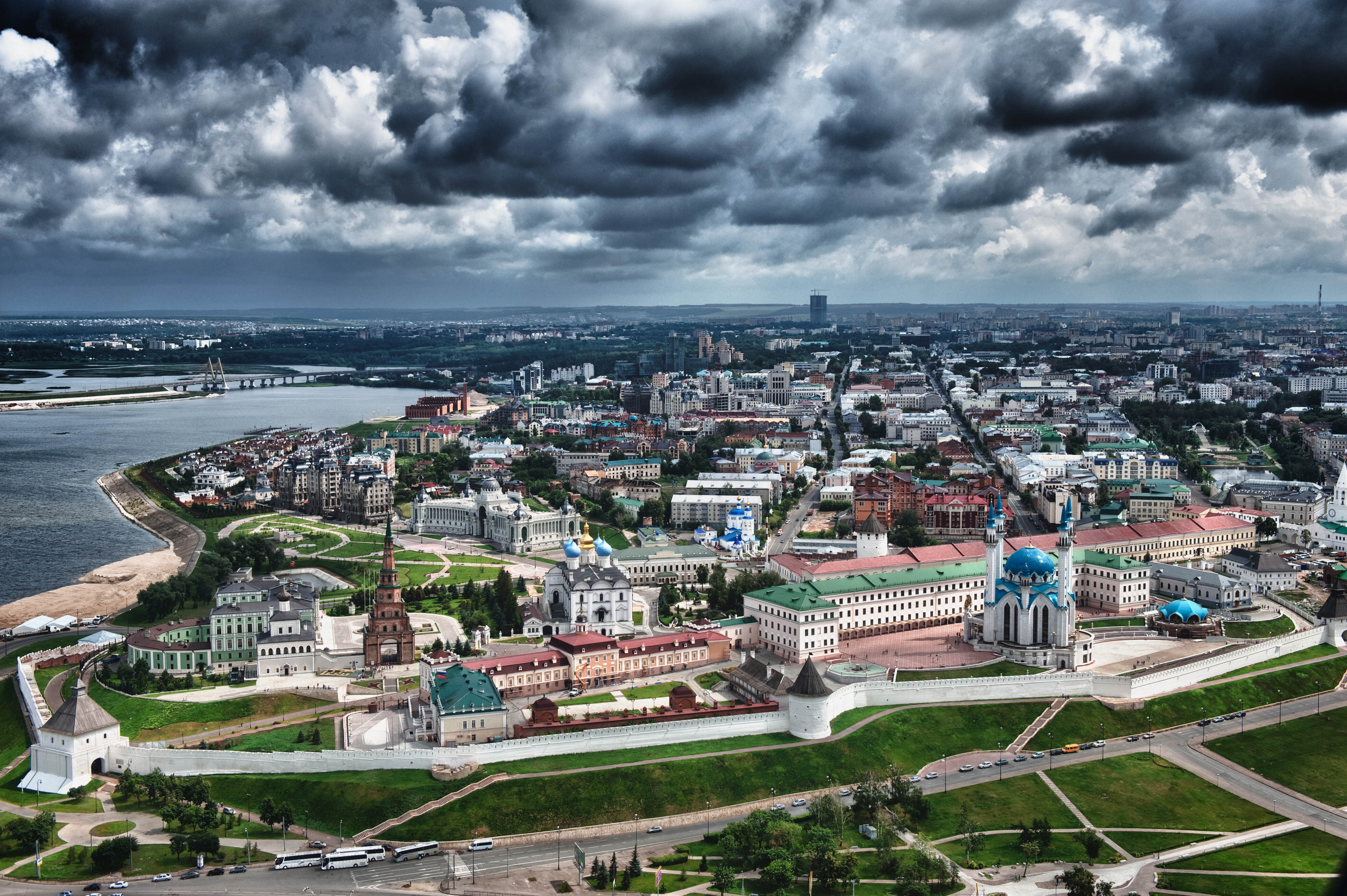
Kazan, the largest city on the Volga

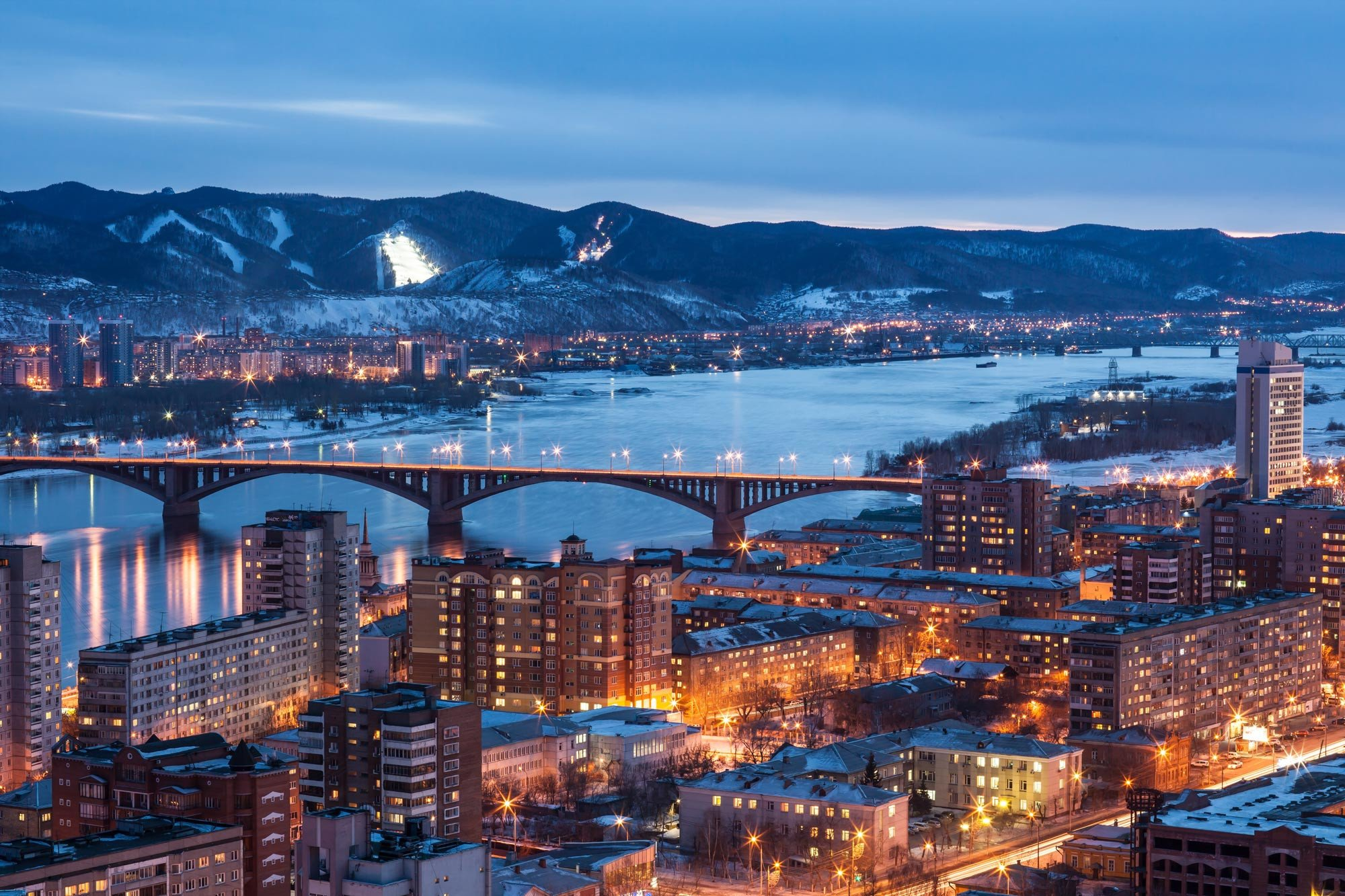
Krasnoyarsk

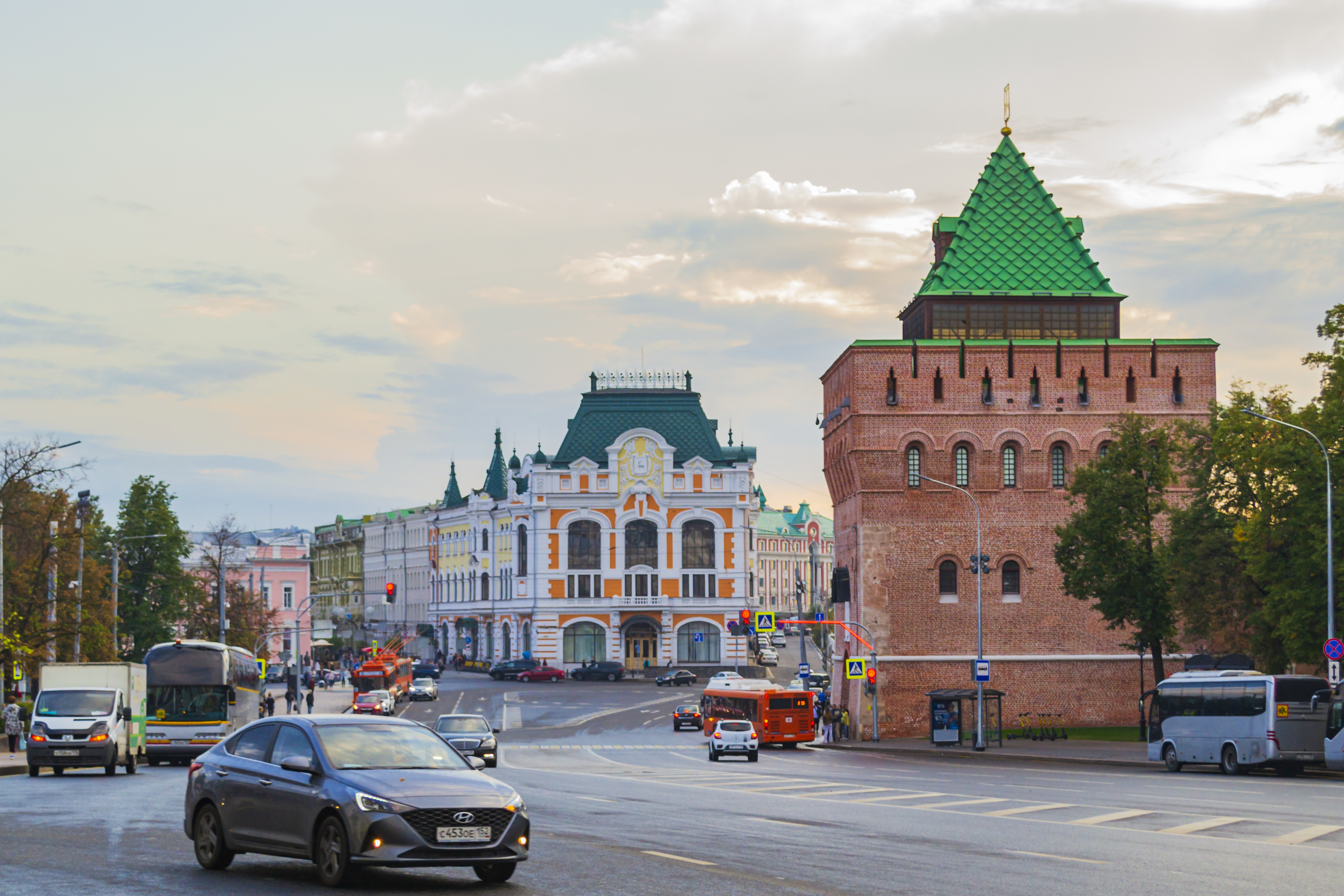
Nizhny Novgorod

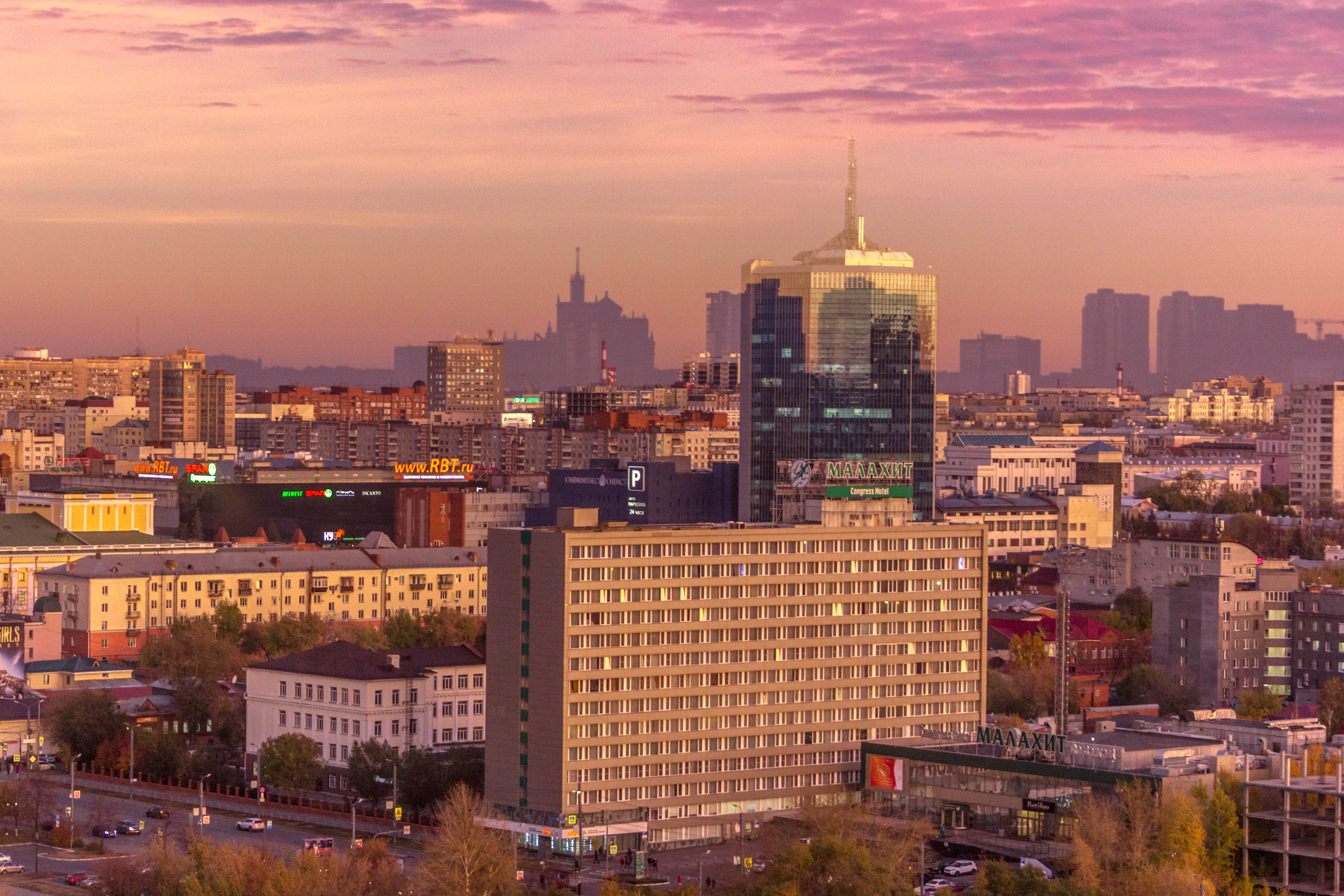
Chelyabinsk

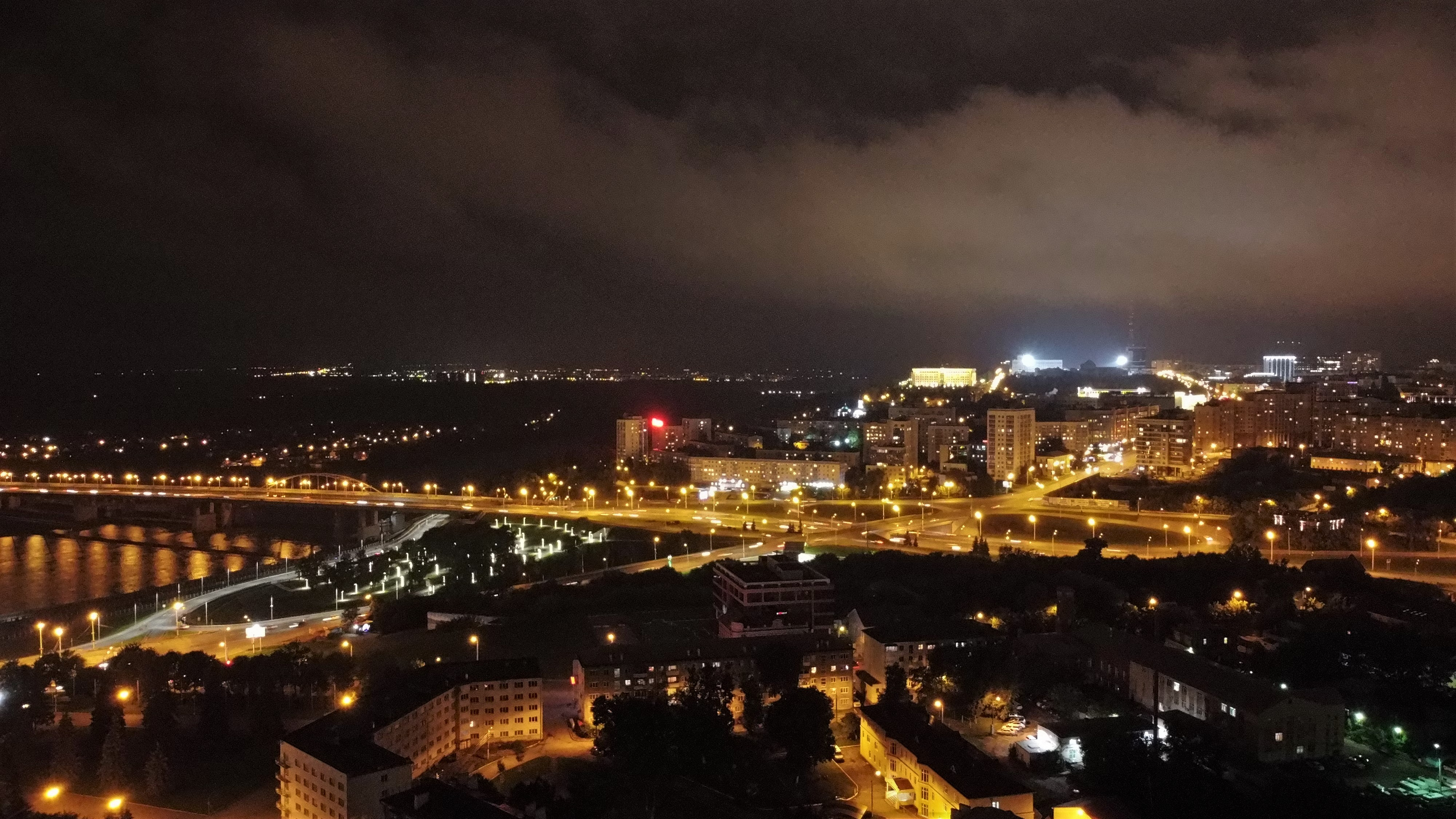
Ufa

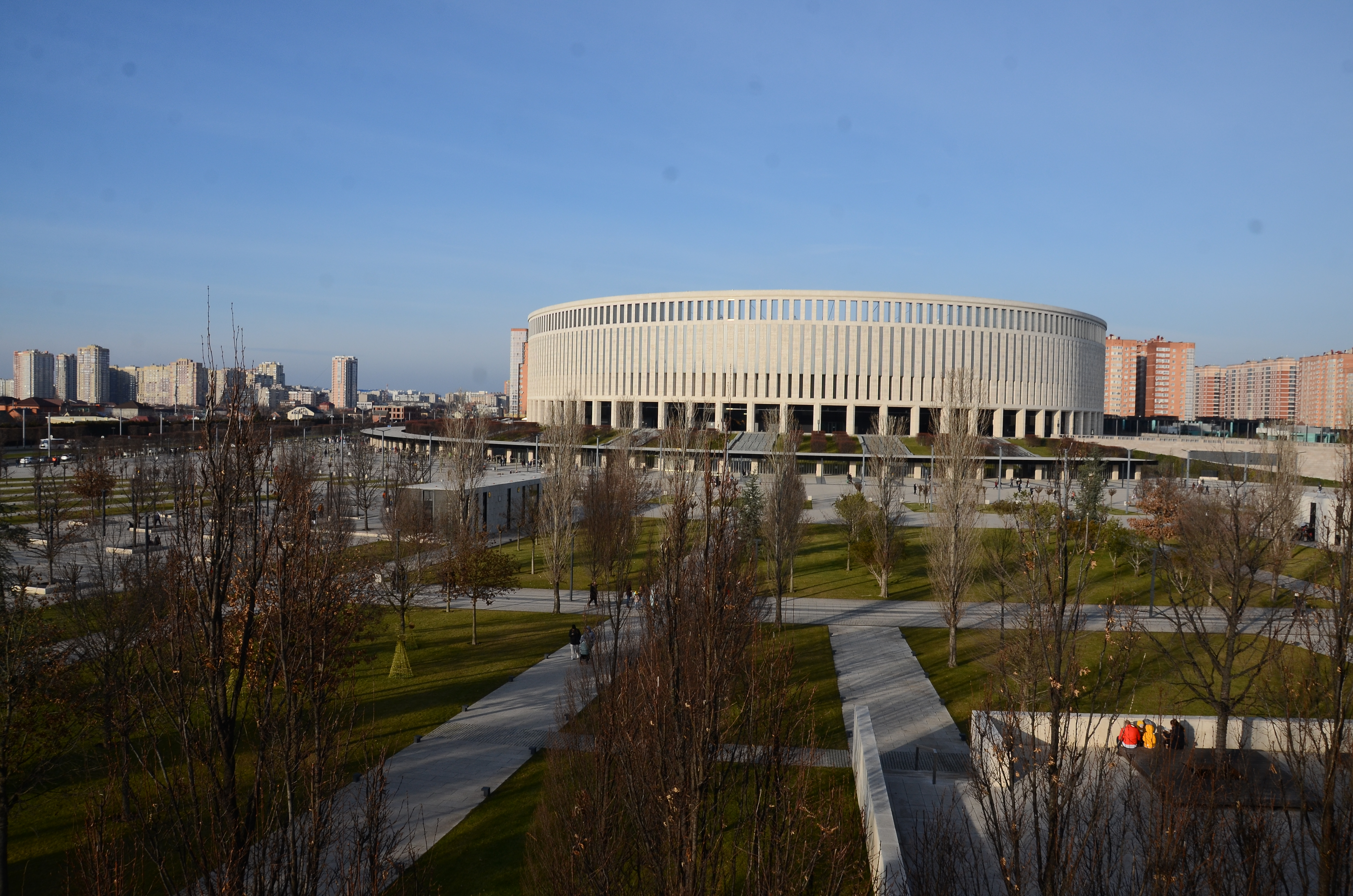
Krasnodar, the largest city in Southern Russia

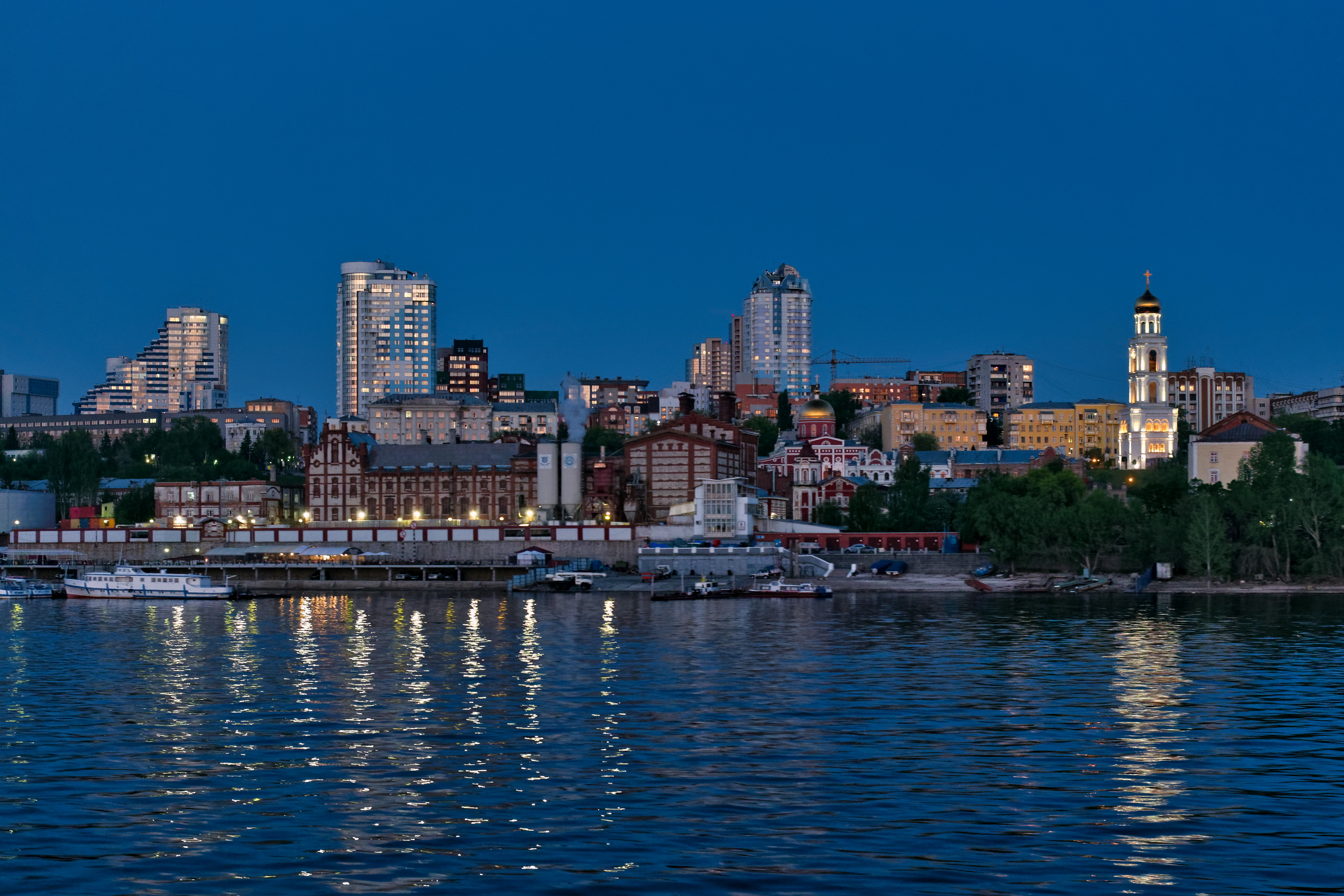
Samara

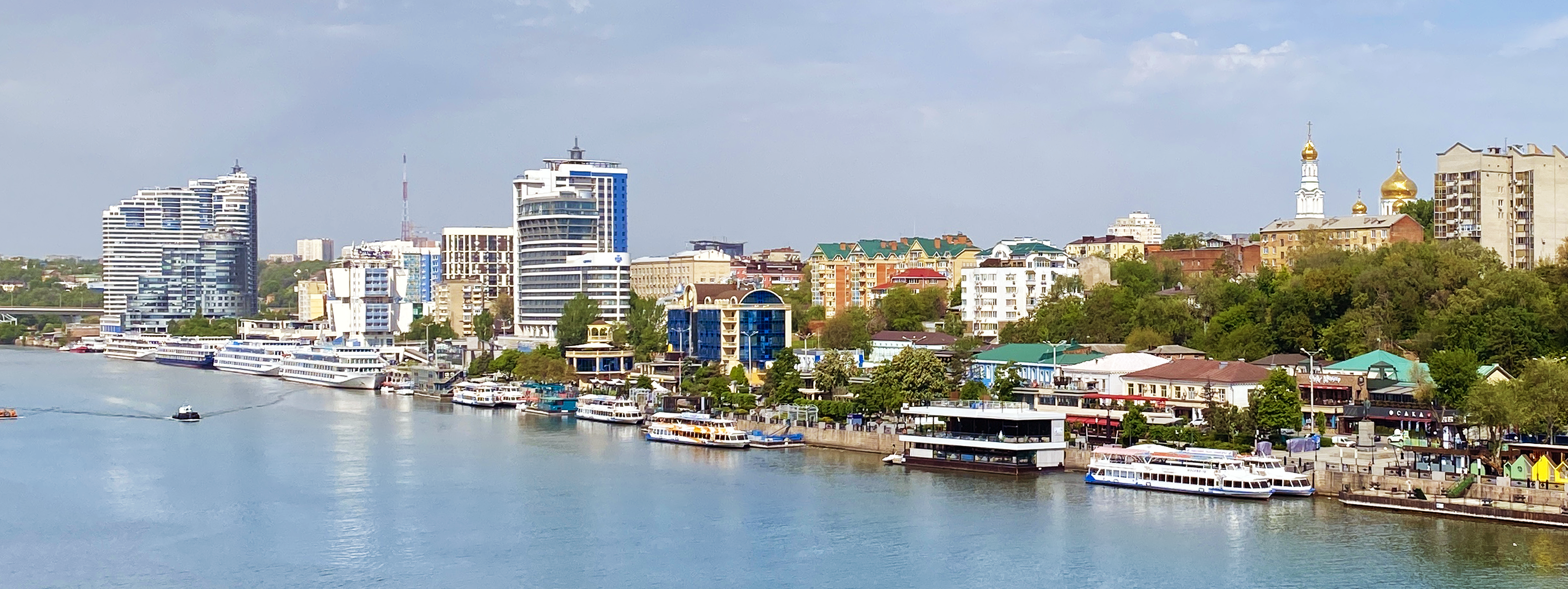
Rostov-on-Don

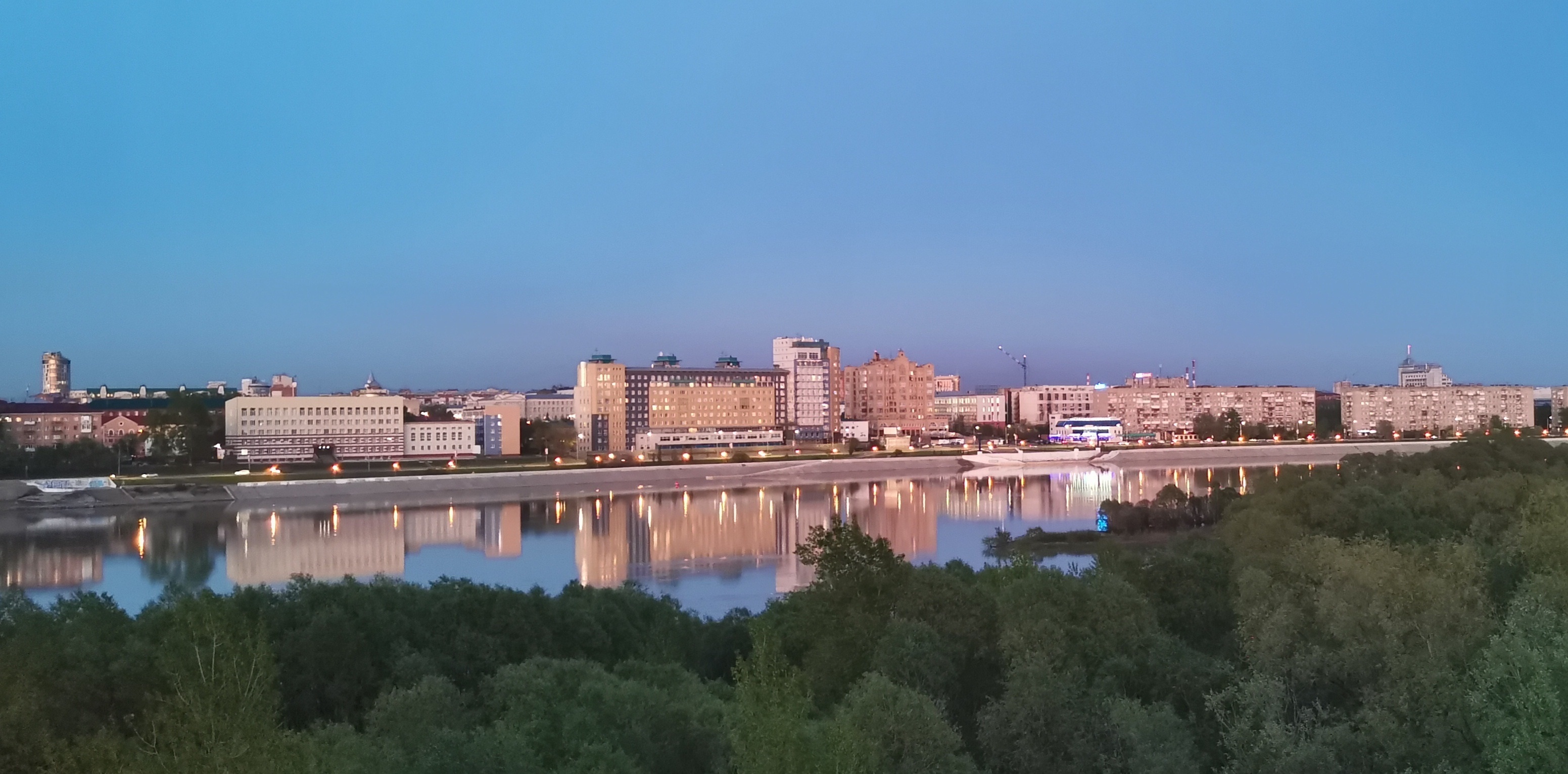
Omsk

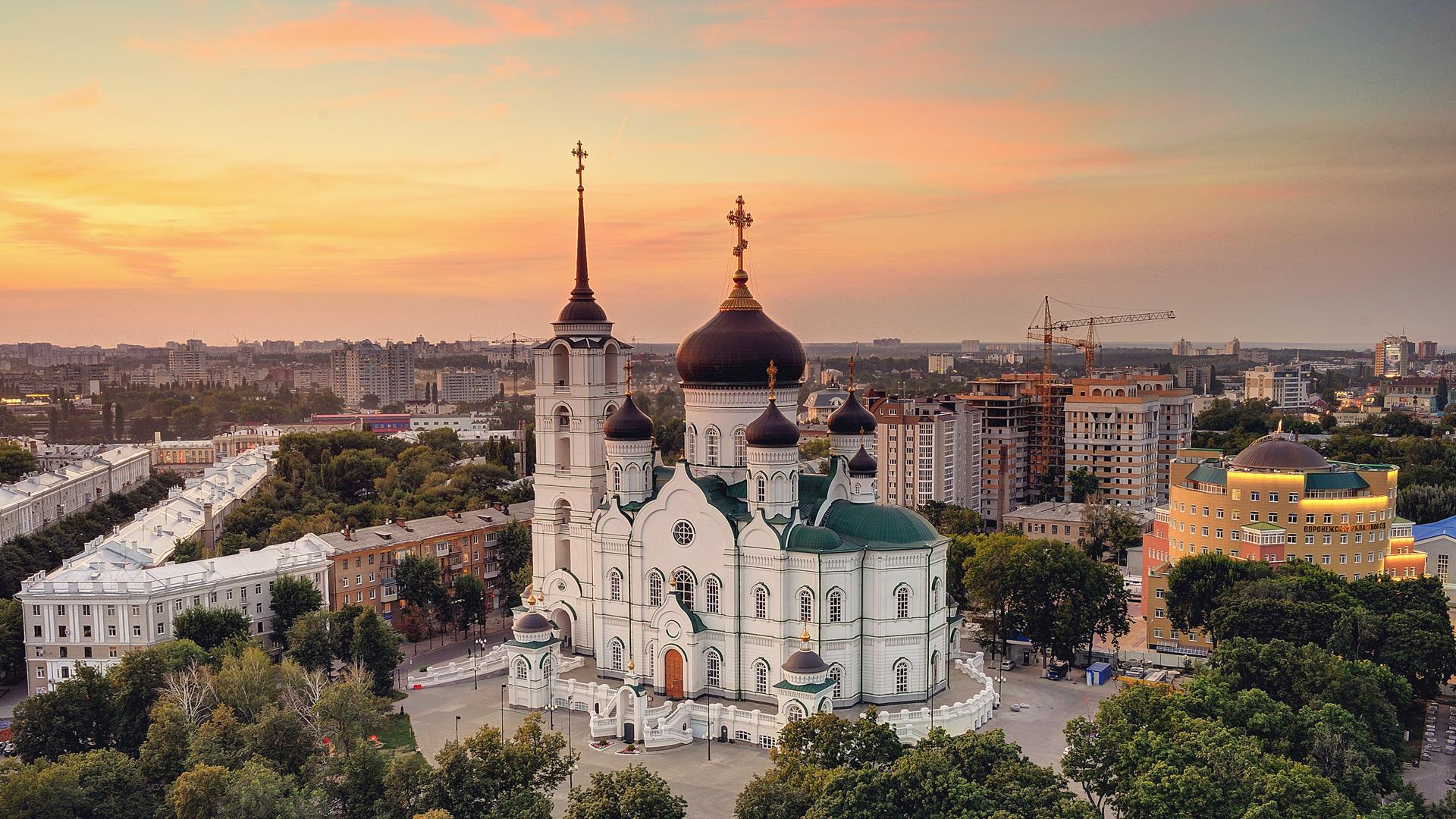
Voronezh

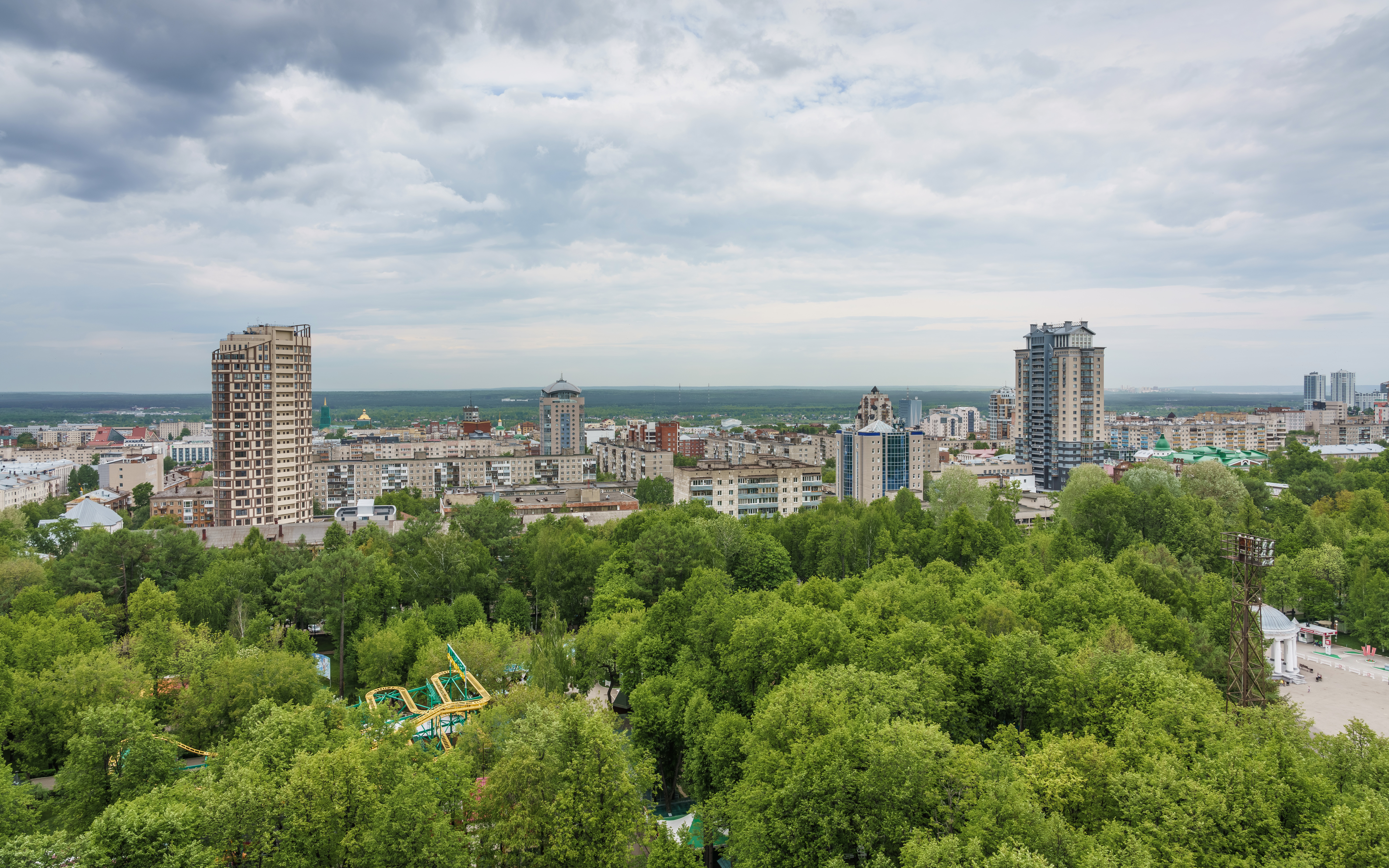
Perm

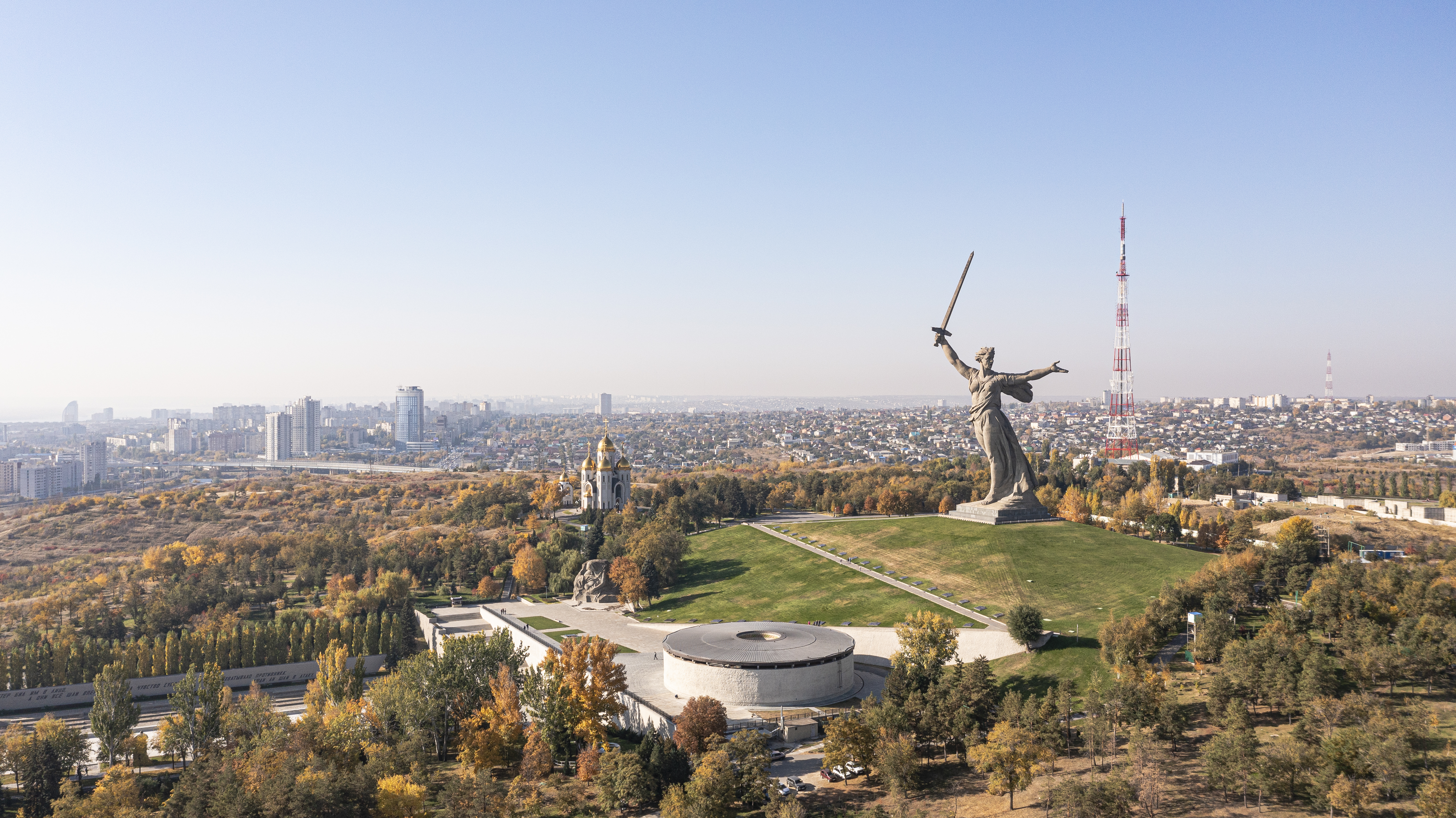
Volgograd

== Location of most populous cities in Russia ==
Location of most populous cities in Russia

== See also ==
- Demographics of Russia
- List of cities and towns in Russia, a complete list of all cities and towns in Russia
- List of federal subjects of Russia by population
