= Votkinsky District =

Votkinsky District Воткинский район (Russian)
- District

Other transcription(s)
  - Udmurt: Вотка ёрос
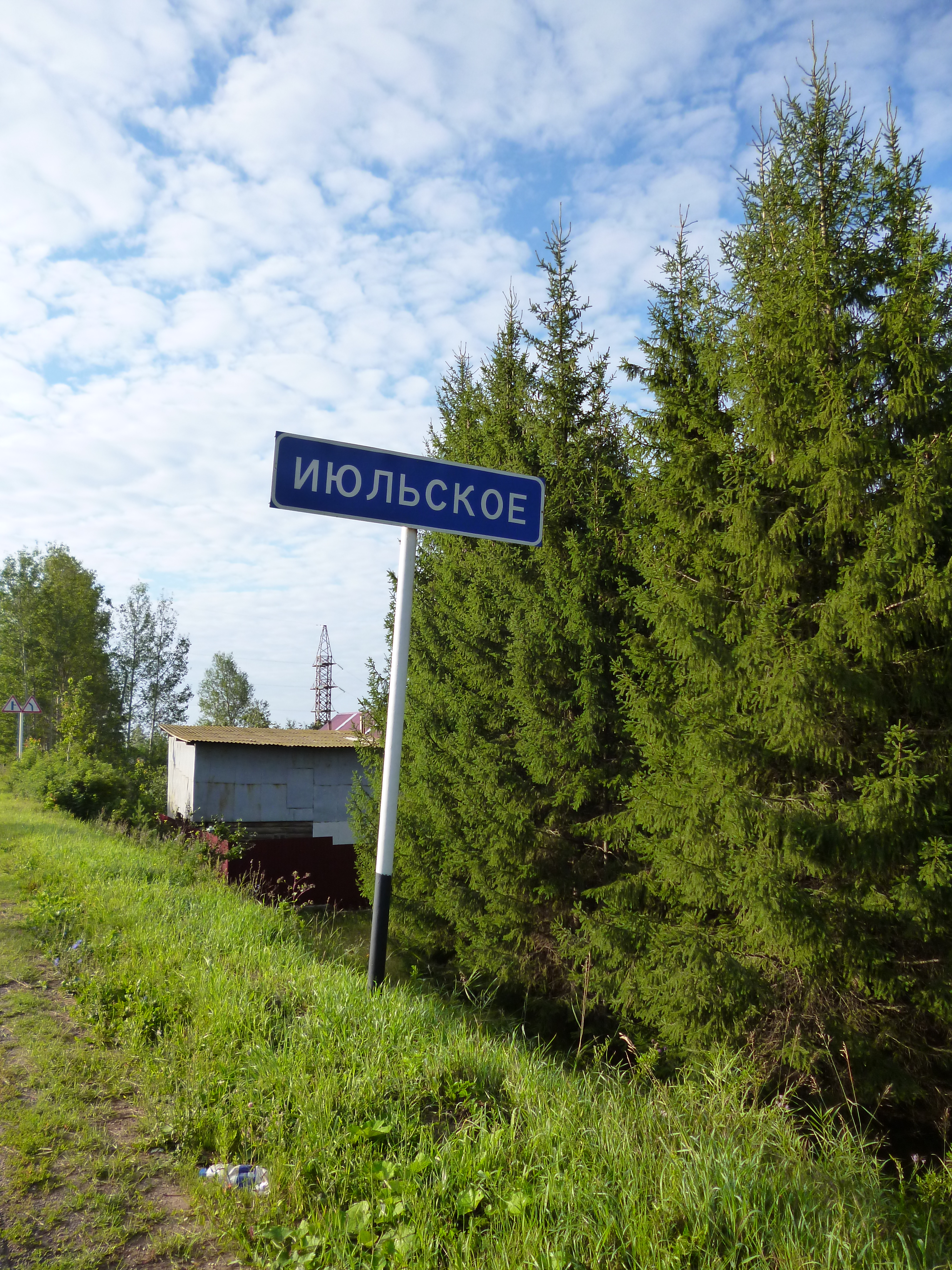
- Entrance to the selo of Iyulskoye in Votkinsky District

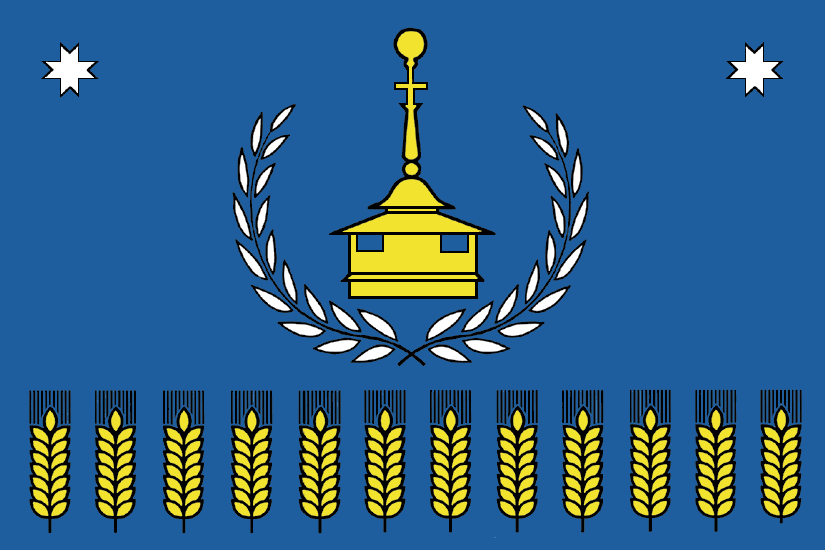
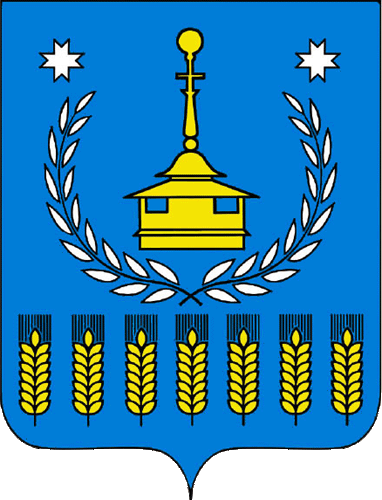
- Flag Coat of arms
- Location of Votkinsky District in the Udmurt Republic
- Coordinates: 57°03′N 53°58′E
- Country: Russia
- Federal subject: Udmurt Republic
- Established: 4 November 1926
- Administrative center: Votkinsk

Area
  - Total: 1,863.8 km^{2} (719.6 sq mi)

Population (2010 Census)
  - Total: 24,114
  - Density: 12.938/km^{2} (33.509/sq mi)
  - Urban: 23.8%
  - Rural: 76.2%

Administrative structure
  - Administrative divisions: 12 Selsoviets
  - Inhabited localities: 69 rural localities

Municipal structure
  - Municipally incorporated as: Votkinsky Municipal District
  - Municipal divisions: 0 urban settlements, 12 rural settlements
- Website: http://votray.ru/

Votkinsky District (Russian: Во́ткинский райо́н; Udmurt: Вотка ёрос, Votka joros) is an administrative and municipal district (raion), one of the twenty-five in the Udmurt Republic, Russia. It is located in the east of the republic. The area of the district is 1,863.8 square kilometers (719.6 sq mi). Its administrative center is the town of Votkinsk (which is not administratively a part of the district). Population: 24,114 (2010 census); 23,709 (2002 Census); 22,767 (1989 Soviet census).

== Geography ==
The main river in the district is the Kama, which defines the district's eastern and southeastern borders. Other important rivers include the Votka and the Siva.

== Administrative and municipal status ==
Within the framework of administrative divisions, Votkinsky District is one of the twenty-five in the republic. The town of Votkinsk serves as its administrative center, despite being incorporated separately as a town of republic significance—an administrative unit with the status equal to that of the districts.

As a municipal division, the district is incorporated as Votkinsky Municipal District. The town of republic significance of Votkinsk is incorporated separately from the district as Votkinsk Urban Okrug.

== Demographics ==
Ethnic composition (according to the 2002 Census):

- Russians: 71%
- Udmurt people: 22.4%
- Tatars: 1.95%
