= Votkinsk Hydroelectric Station =

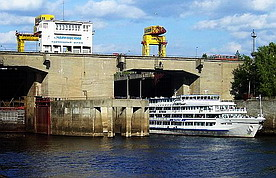
- Downstream side of ship lock

- Location within Russia
- Official name: Votkinskaya HPS
- Country: Russia
- Location: Votkinsk
- Coordinates: 56°47′27″N 54°05′22″E
- Status: In use
- Construction began: 1955
- Opening date: 1965
- Owner: RusHydro

Dam and spillways
- Type of dam: Concrete gravity/embankment
- Impounds: Kama River
- Height: 34 m (112 ft)
- Length: 4,790 m (15,715 ft)
- Dam volume: 21,907,200 m^{3} (773,645,467 ft^{3})
- Spillways: 8
- Spillway type: Service, crest overflow weir
- Spillway capacity: 11,300 m^{3}/s (399,056 cu ft/s)

Reservoir
- Creates: Votkinsk Reservoir
- Total capacity: 9,400,000,000 m^{3} (3.31957867182×10^{11} ft^{3})
- Catchment area: 184,000 km^{2} (71,043 mi^{2})
- Surface area: 1,120 km^{2} (432 mi^{2})
- Maximum water depth: 28 m (92 ft)

Power Station
- Commission date: 1961-1963
- Hydraulic head: 23 m (75 ft) (max.); 16.75 m (55 ft) (design)
- Turbines: 2 x 100 MW; 8 x 115 MW
- Installed capacity: 1,120 MW
- Annual generation: 2.2 billion kWh
- Website http://www.votges.rushydro.ru/

The Votkinsk Hydroelectric Station (Russian: Воткинская ГЭС) is a dam and hydroelectric power station on the Kama River along the border of Perm Krai and Udmurtia, Russia. It is 30 km (19 mi) south of Votkinsk and its main purpose is power generation and navigation. The power station has a 1,120 MW installed capacity and the dam also supports a ship lift. Construction on the dam began in 1955, the first generator was operational in 1961 and the last in 1963. The entire project was complete in 1965.

== Design ==
The dam has a maximum height of 34 m (112 ft) and a length of 4,790 m (15,715 ft). It is composed of a combined 365 m (1,198 ft) long concrete power station and 191 m (627 ft) long spillway section which are both flanked by the embankment dam portion. The embankment portion of the dam contains 20,899,000 m^{3} (738,041,220 ft^{3}) of soil and 884,400 m^{3} (31,232,291 ft^{3}) of rock, drainage and filter placement. The concrete structures of the dam, namely the spillway and power station comprise 1,236,600 m^{3} (43,670,117 ft^{3}).

The power station is 269 m (883 ft) long, 22.5 m (74 ft) wide and 28.3 m (93 ft) high. It contains 10 Kaplan turbine-generators. There are six transformers ranging from 110-500 kV.

Votkinsk Reservoir holds 9,400,000,000 m^{3} (3.31957867182×10^{11} ft^{3}) of water, of which 3,700,000,000 m^{3} (1.30664266870×10^{11} ft^{3}) is active or "useful" capacity. The reservoir's catchment or drainage area is 184,000 km^{2} (71,043 mi^{2}), its surface area is 1,120 km^{2} (432 mi^{2}) and its maximum depth is 28 m (92 ft). It is 365 km (227 mi) long and 10 km (6 mi) across at its widest.

== See also ==
- Nizhnekamsk Hydroelectric Station
