= Chaykovsky, Perm Krai =

Town in Perm Krai, Russia

Chaykovsky Чайковский
- Town
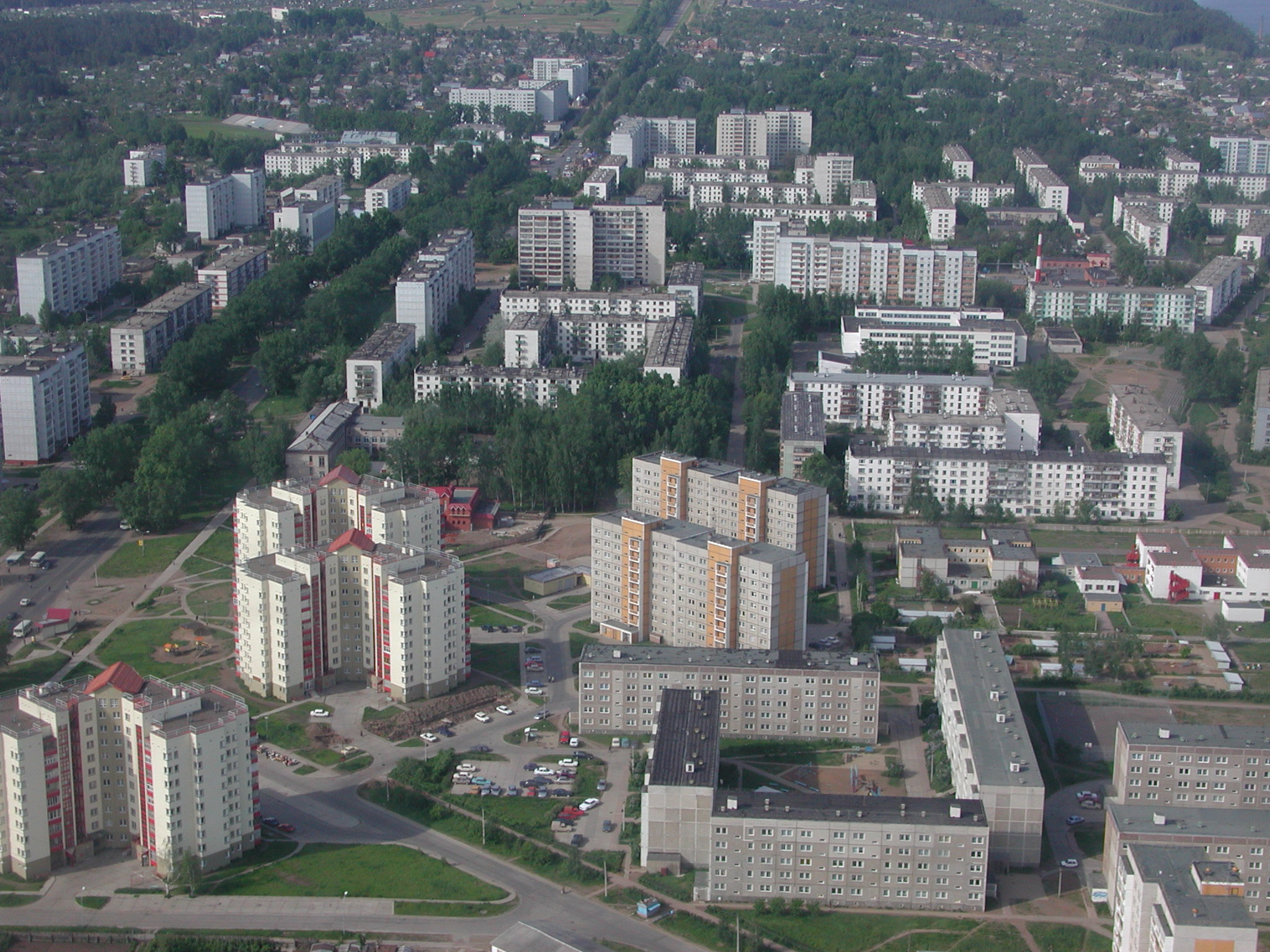
- Aerial view of Chaykovsky

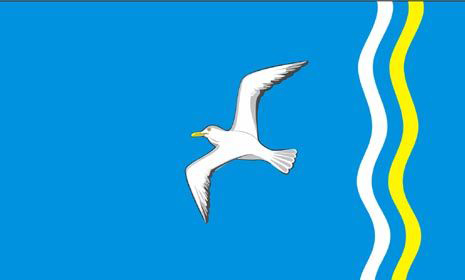
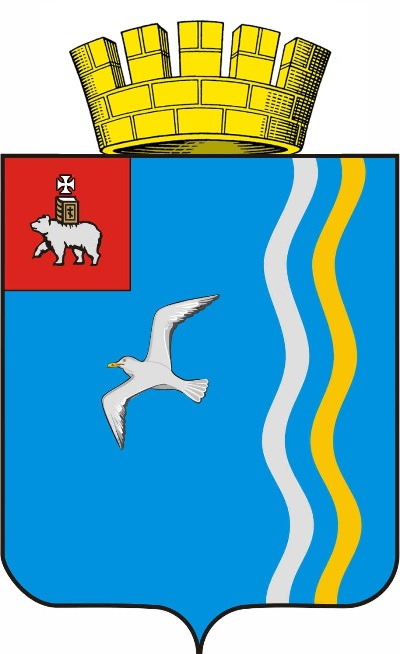
- Flag Coat of arms
- Interactive map of Chaykovsky
- Location of Chaykovsky Chaykovsky (Perm Krai)
- Coordinates: 56°46′N 54°09′E
- Country: Russia
- Federal subject: Perm Krai
- Founded: 1955
- Town status since: 1962

Government
  - Head: Yuriy Vostrikov

Area
  - Total: 56.49 km^{2} (21.81 sq mi)
- Elevation: 95 m (312 ft)

Population (2010 Census)
  - Total: 82,895
  - Estimate (2025): 74,382 (−10.3%)
  - Rank: 200th in 2010
  - Density: 1,467/km^{2} (3,801/sq mi)

Administrative status
  - Subordinated to: town of krai significance of Chaykovsky
  - Capital of: town of krai significance of Chaykovsky

Municipal status
  - Municipal district: Chaykovsky Municipal District
  - Urban settlement: Chaykovskoye Urban Settlement
  - Capital of: Chaykovsky Municipal District, Chaykovskoye Urban Settlement
- Time zone: UTC+5 (MSK+2)
- Postal codes: 617760-617766, 617769
- Dialing code: +7 34241
- OKTMO ID: 57735000001
- Website: chaikovskiyregion.ru

Chaykovsky (Russian: Чайковский) is a town in Perm Krai, Russia, located on the Kama River 325 kilometers (202 mi) southwest of Perm, the administrative center of the krai. Population: The population as of 2023 is 75,324 people.

== Name ==
The town is named after the Russian composer Pyotr Ilyich Tchaikovsky, who was born in the nearby town of Votkinsk.

== Geography ==
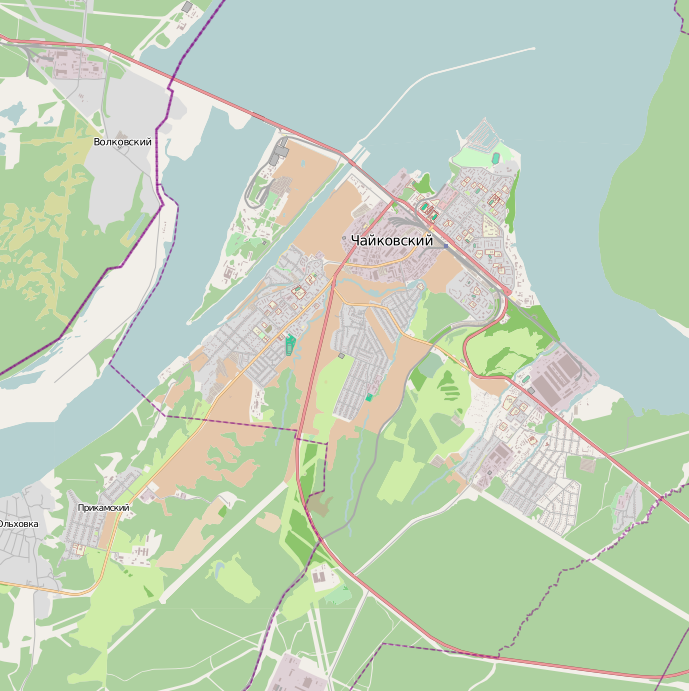
Map of the town

The town is located in the Cis-Ural region on left bank of the Kama River, near its confluence with the Saygatka in the southwestern part of Perm Krai. The confluence of the Kama and the Saygatka and the nearby Votkinsk Reservoir form a peninsula on which the town is located.

The area of Chaykovskoye Urban Settlement is 56.49 square kilometers (21.81 sq mi) (including the water surface), while the аrea of the town proper is about 31 square kilometers (12 sq mi).

Chaykovskoye Urban Settlement borders with Yelovsky District in the north, Vankovsky Rural Settlement in the northeast, Fokinsky and Bolshe-Bukorsky Rural Settlements in the east, Olkhovsky Rural Settlement in the south, and with Votkinsky District of the Udmurt Republic in the west.

== History ==
It was founded in 1955 as a settlement serving the construction of Votkinsk's hydroelectric power station. The village of Saygatka, known since 1646, used to occupy the place where Chaykovsky now stands. In 1956, Chaykovsky was granted urban-type settlement status, and in 1962, it was granted town status.

== Administrative and municipal status ==
Within the framework of administrative divisions, it is, together with fifty rural localities, incorporated as the town of krai significance of Chaykovsky—an administrative unit with the status equal to that of the districts. As a municipal division, the town of Chaykovsky is incorporated as Chaykovskoye Urban Settlement within Chaykovsky Municipal District and serves as the municipal district's administrative center, while the fifty rural localities are grouped into nine rural settlements within Chaykovsky Municipal District.

== Politics ==
Igor Andriyiv has been head of the Chaykovsky urban settlement since 20 December 2009. In Chaykovsky and the district, the election of the heads of local self-government has never been won by United Russia.

== Economy ==
=== Industry ===
- Construction on the Votkinsk Hydroelectric Station began in 1955 (full power since 1962). It has ten turbines for an installed capacity of 1,020 MW. The station produce 2.2 billion kilowatt-hours on average per year. As a result of its dam, the water level rose 23 meters and the reservoir has an area of 1125 square kilometers. The dam also supports a shipping lock with two lines.
- Combine of silk textile. Construction began in 1962 and the first factory was made at 1966. At that moment the combine was a large factory of that kind in Europe. In the late eighties 100 milliones meter of textile was produced per year by the combine. Now, the combine is world-famous factory "Joint Stock Company Tchaikovsky Textile"
- Works of synthetic caoutchouc, was founded at 1979. Now, the works is "Uralorgsynthes, JSC". It produce liquefied hydrocarbon gase, benzol, butane, izo-butane etc.
- Gazprom Transgas Chaykovsky, daughter enterprise of Gazprom, is engaged by transport of gas
- Works of gas-stove, make stove under trade mark "Darina"

Besides, there is a lot of less large factories, for example, yard and ship repair works, metal manufacture work, meat-packing factory, dairy factory and common for a town communal plants, like water-supply plant.

=== Transportation ===
==== Auto ====
Chaykovsky is situated on the Kazan–Yekaterinburg route. From the town to Izhevsk about 100 km, to Perm about 300 km, to Kazan about 400 km, to Yekaterinburg about 600 km. There is bus service to these cities. Into the town bus service is used, too.

==== Railways ====
Trains to Izhevsk are possible from the town. In the town there is railway, that sides to railway Kazan — Yekaterinburg. However, it not used for passengers.

==== River transport ====
There is river station, it not used for passengers, because of high prices, and earlier ships on underwater wings were going. However, river station is used as a tourist ship.

==== Air transport ====
Chaykovsky closest airport is located in Izhevsk. Chaykovsky used to have a small airport, for small airplanes however there are now plans to develop a large modern airport.

== Demographics ==
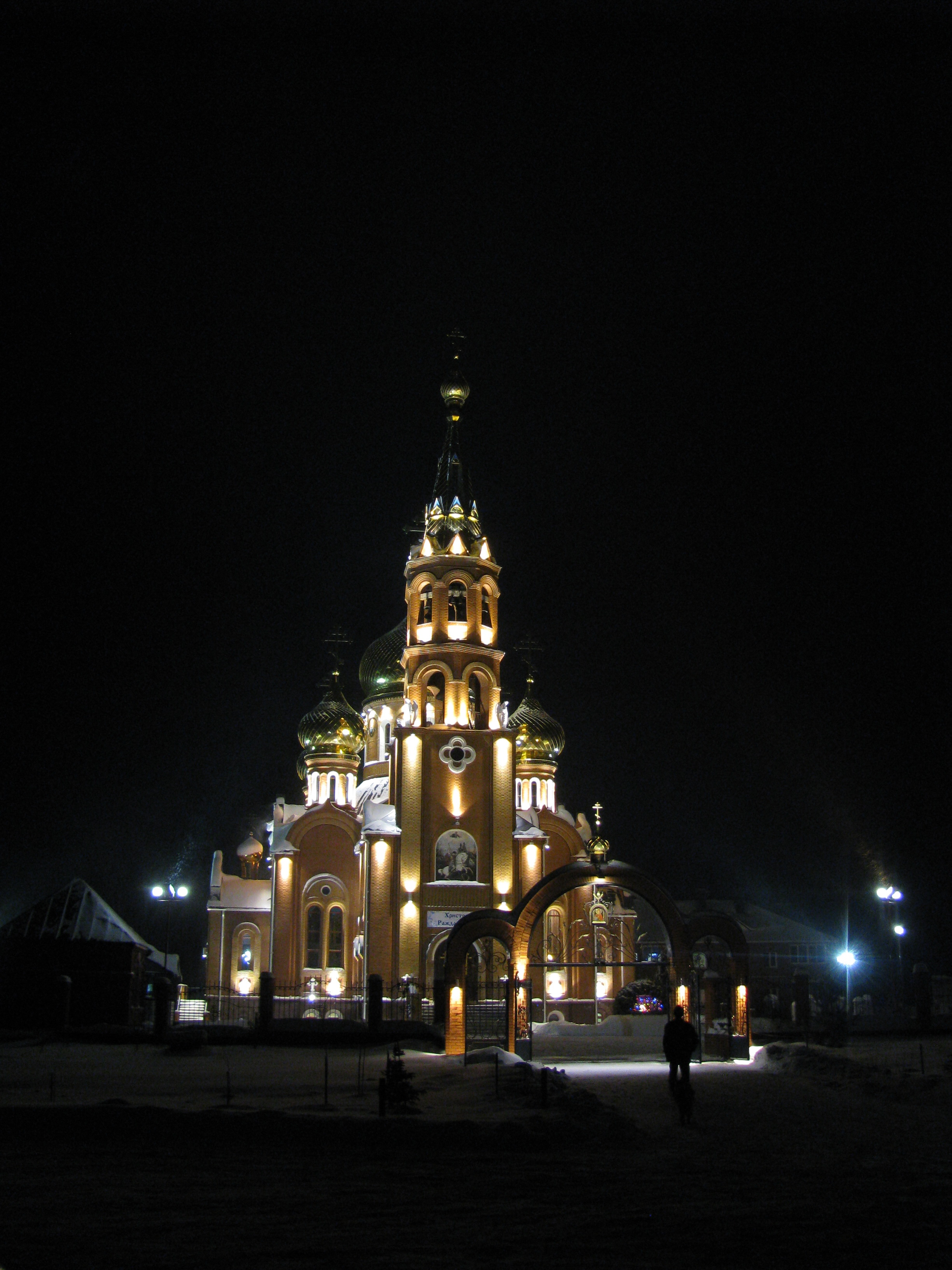
Church of St.George

Chaykovsky has one of the highest levels of natality in Perm Krai, because of comparatively low death-rate and comparatively high birth-rate.

== Education, culture, sports ==
There are 13 schools, 1 gymnasium, 1 lyceum, 4 trade schools, 5 technical schools, 2 musical school. Possibility to get higher education there is in Institute of physical culture and branches of two technical universities.

Chaykovsky has available museum of local lore and an art gallery, where there are a lot of works of famous Russian painters. Since 1982 there is Town Dramatic Theater. Since 1978, every three years traditional Festival of children musical art is conducted.

In Chaykovsky there is a modern mounting sky complex, biathlon complex, and many gymnasiums.

== Tourism ==
Chaykovsky is a famous touristic center on Western Ural, especially for tourists that travel on touristic ships.

== Twin towns and sister cities ==
Chaykovsky is the sister city of (twinned with):

- Neustrelitz, Germany
