= Votkinsk Reservoir =

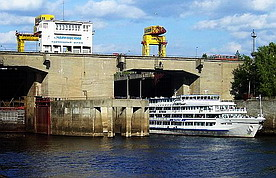
- Tchaikovsky shipping lock.

- Location within Perm Krai
- Location: Tchaikovsky
- Coordinates: 57.0°N 54.2°E
- Type: reservoir
- Primary inflows: Kama River
- Primary outflows: Kama River
- Basin countries: Russia

Votkinsk Reservoir is a reservoir formed by the dam of the Votkinsk Hydroelectric Station on the Kama River in Perm Krai, Russia. Besides electricity generation, the reservoir also facilitates navigation and water supply. The town of Chaikovsky is located on the reservoir.

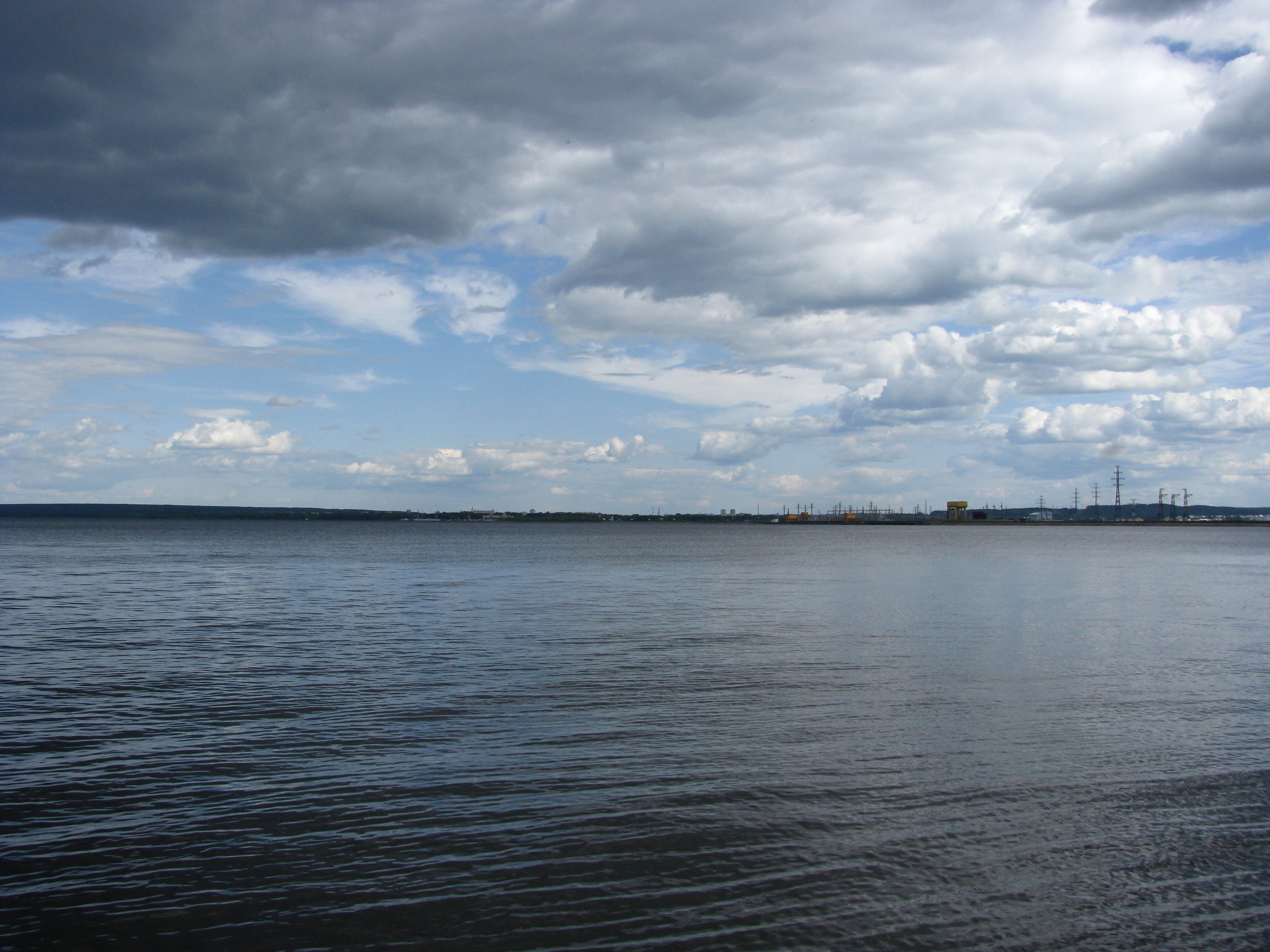
View across reservoir to the hydroelectric station
