= Akhunovo (disambiguation) =

Akhunovo is a village in Blagovarsky District, Bashkortostan, Russia.

Akhunovo or Axun (Bashkir name) may also refer to:

- Akhunovo, Aktanyshsky District, Republic of Bashkortostan
- Akhunovo, Davlekanovsky District, Republic of Bashkortostan
- Akhunovo, Salavatsky District, Republic of Bashkortostan
- Akhunovo, Uchalinsky District, Republic of Bashkortostan
