= Menzelinsk (disambiguation) =

Menzelinsk is a town in the Republic of Tatarstan, Russia.

Menzelinsk may also refer to:

- Menzelinsk Airport, an airport in the Republic of Tatarstan, Russia

== See also ==
- Menzelya River
- Menzelinsky District
