= Urazay, Aktanyshsky District =

Urazay Уразай
- derevnya
- Location within Tatarstan
- Country: Russia
- Region: Tatarstan
- District: Aqtanış District
- Time zone: UTC+3:00

Urazay (Tatar: Уразай, romanized: Urazay) is a rural locality (a derevnya) in Aqtanış District, Tatarstan. The population was 406 as of 2010. Urazay, Aktanyshsky District is located 10 km from Aqtanış, district's administrative centre, and 367 km from Qazan, republic's capital, by road. The earliest known record of the settlement dates from 1674. There are 6 streets in the village.

== Notable people ==
- Rauis Gosmanov
