= Aday =

Aday may refer to:

== Places ==
- Aday, Aktanyshsky District, rural locality in Aqtanış District, Tatarstan
- Aday, Kukmara District, rural locality in Kukmara District, Tatarstan
- Aday-Stephenson House, historic house in Marshall, Arkansas

== People ==
- Aday Benítez (born 1987), Spanish footballer
- Aday Mara (born 2005), Spanish basketball player
- Amanda Aday (born 1981), American stage actor
- Michael Lee Aday or Meat Loaf (1947–2022), American singer
- Pearl Aday (born 1975), American female singer, daughter of Meat Loaf
