= Tıñlamas =

Tıñlamas Тыңламас
- derevnya
- Location within Tatarstan
- Country: Russia
- Region: Tatarstan
- District: Aqtanış District
- Time zone: UTC+3:00

Tıñlamas (Tatar: Тыңламас, romanized: Tıñlamas) is a rural locality (a derevnya) in Aqtanış District, Tatarstan. The population was 290 as of 2010. Tıñlamas is located 9 km from Aqtanış, district's administrative centre, and 388 km from Qazan, republic's capital, by road. The earliest known record of the settlement dates from 1772. There are 2 streets in the village.
