= Tatar Suıqsuı =

Tatarskiye Suksy Татар Суыксуы Tatar Suıqsuı
- selo
- Location within Tatarstan
- Country: Russia
- Region: Tatarstan
- District: Aktanyshsky District
- Time zone: UTC+3:00

Tatarskiye Suksy (Russian: Татарские Суксы, Tatar: Татар Суыксуы, romanized: Tatar Suıqsuı) is a rural locality (a selo) in Aktanyshsky District, Tatarstan. The population was 855 as of 2010. Tatarskiye Suksy is located 28 km from Aktanysh, district's administrative centre, and 348 km from Kazan, republic's capital, by road. The earliest known record of the settlement dates from 1745. There are 9 streets in the village.
