= Muslyumovsky District =

Muslyumovsky District Муслюмовский район (Russian)
- District

Other transcription(s)
  - Tatar: Мөслим районы
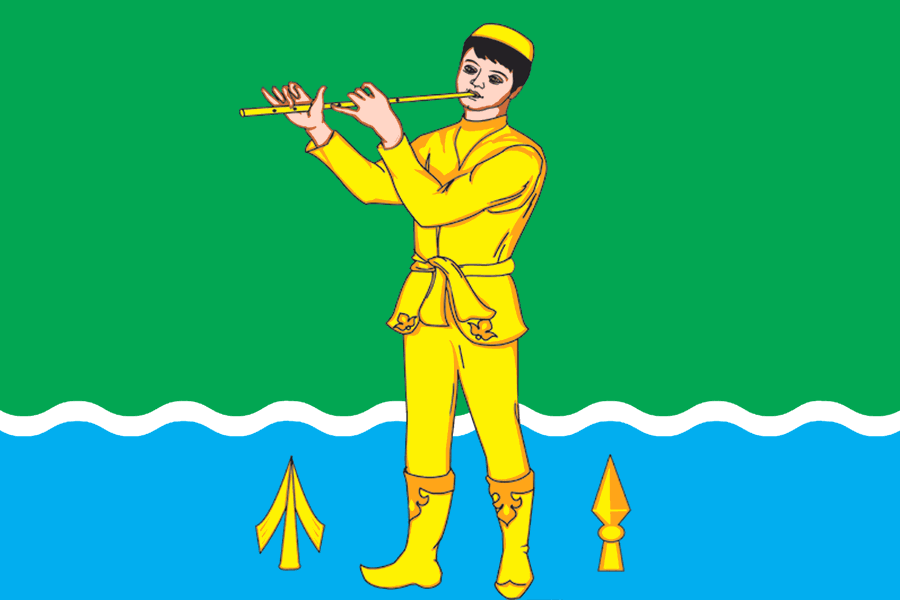
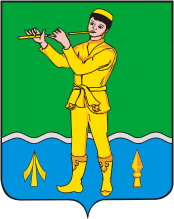
- Flag Coat of arms
- Location of Muslyumovsky District in the Republic of Tatarstan
- Coordinates: 55°19′N 53°18′E
- Country: Russia
- Federal subject: Republic of Tatarstan
- Established: 10 August 1930
- Administrative center: Muslyumovo

Area
  - Total: 1,464.3 km^{2} (565.4 sq mi)

Population (2010 Census)
  - Total: 21,884
  - Density: 14.945/km^{2} (38.707/sq mi)
  - Urban: 0%
  - Rural: 100%

Administrative structure
  - Inhabited localities: 71 rural localities

Municipal structure
  - Municipally incorporated as: Muslyumovsky Municipal District
  - Municipal divisions: 0 urban settlements, 19 rural settlements
- Time zone: UTC+3 (MSK)
- OKTMO ID: 92642000
- Website: http://muslumovo.tatarstan.ru/

Muslyumovsky District (Russian: Муслюмовский райо́н; Tatar: Мөслим районы) is a territorial administrative unit and municipal district of the Republic of Tatarstan within the Russian Federation. The administrative centre of the district is the village of Muslyumovo. At the beginning of 2020, 19,326 persons lived in the district. The entirety of the district population are rural residents.

The district was established in 1930. In 1959, part of the territory of the abolished Kalininsky district was annexed to it. In 1963, the district was abolished with the transfer of its territory to the Menzelinsky and Sarmanovsky districts, but already at the end of 1965 it had been reestablished within its contemporary borders.

There is a small oil field in the district. Since 2002, its development has been carried out by "Mellyaneft". The main engine of the district economy is agriculture. There is a state natural park of biological (botanical) profile "Narat-Astinsky bor" in the district.

== Geography ==
The Muslyumovsky district is located in the east of the Republic of Tatarstan. It shares borders with Aktanyshsky, Menzelinsky, Sarmanovsky and Aznakaevsky districts of the republic as well as with the Republic of Bashkortostan (Bakalinsky district).

The topography of the district is a typical plain with a general slope of its surface to the northwest. Prevailing heights are 100-200 m above sea level, while the maximum height of terrain features is 257.7 m. The main rivers in the district are the Ik River and tributaries of the Mellya.

The regional climate is continental with warm summers and moderately cold winters. The average annual air temperature is +3.8 °C. The warmest month is July with an average temperature +19.7 °C and maximum temperatures up to +39 °C. At the end of November, a stable snow cover forms, which lasts about 150 days a year on average. The average January temperature is −12.2 °C, the absolute annual minimum temperature of −49 °C was also recorded in January.

== Coat of arms and flag ==
The main figure of the coat of arms is a young man, symbolizing youth, prosperity, striving for excellence and movement forward. Most of all the young man represents the great potential of the district. The young man is dressed in stylized Tatar clothes and plays the national instrument, the kurai. It shows the historical and cultural features of the district where the population is overwhelmingly Tatars. The spearheads represent the fact that many copper items, including weapons, were found in these areas. The blue wavy part of the coat of arms refers to the Ik River, which divides the area in half, and its color symbolizes honor, nobility and spirituality. The green stripe shows nature, fertility, life and agricultural development. The yellow coloring of the suit and spearheads is a symbol of harvest, wealth, solar energy and warmth, respect and intelligence.

The flag is based on heraldic elements of the district coat of arms.

== History ==
=== Background ===
The territory of the Muslyumovsky district was part of the Menzelinsky district of the Ufa Governorate until 1920. It was in the Tatar Autonomous Soviet Socialist Republic until being abolished in 1930. Multiple districts were created in its place, including Muslyumovsky. The Novoagbyazovsky village council was transferred from the Muslyumovsky district of the Tatar ASSR to the Bakalinsky District of the Bashkir ASSR by the Decree of the Supreme Soviet of the RSFSR in the period 1937-1940. A part of the district's territory was also transferred to the newly formed Kalininsky district in 1935. By 1940 the land area of the Muslyumovsky district was 1261 km², there were 28 village councils, 77 settlements with a total population of 36 thousand people. On October 12, 1959, part of the land of the abolished Kalininsky district was included into this territory, increasing the total area of the Muslimovsky district to 1593.3 km², the number of village councils to 19 and settlements to 96.

In 1963, the Muslyumovsky district was abolished and its territory transferred to the Menzelinsky and Sarmanovsky districts, but already at the end of 1965 it had been reestablished.[4][16]. By 1965 the total area encompassed by the district had grown to 1433 km², and the number of settlements had increased to 78 with these divided into 17 village councils while the population grew to 32.5 thousand persons.

=== Current Muslyumovsky District ===
In 2002, Rishat Khabipov became the head of the Muslyumovsky district administration. In 2006, after the Russian municipal reforms, municipalities were created, and Rishat Khabipov was appointed head of the Muslyumovsky municipal formation (district). He was replaced in 2013 by Ramil Mullin, who was re-elected in 2020.

== Municipal-territorial structure ==
There are 71 settlements in the Muslyumovsky district organized into 19 rural settlements. The administrative centers of these rural settlements are villages Amikeevo, Balanny, Bayukovo, Bolshoi Chekmak, Varyash-Bash, Tatarskoe Bulyarovo, Kryash-Shuran, Mellya-Tamak, Mitryaevo, Mikhailovka, Muslyumovo, Nizhny Tabyn, Novye Usy, Octyabr, Semyakovo, Starye Karamaly, Toymetygildino, and Russkiy Shugan.

== Economy ==
=== Industry ===
There is a small oil field in the Muslyumovsky district. Since 2002, its development has been carried out by "Mellyaneft". The largest regional industrial enterprises are "Muslyumovskaya construction organization", "Radial" (extraction of nonmetallic materials), "Muslyumovskie engineering networks" (heat supply), the branch "Tatavtodor" (road construction), "Agromaster" (production of seeding complexes and tillage equipment ).

There were 476 small businesses registered in the district in 2018. Most of them (45.3%) were involved in wholesale and retail trade, vehicle repair, household and other products, another 25% in agricultural activities, transport and communications (8.9%) and manufacturing (7%). In the first half of 2020, goods produced in the region were shipped for 1.2 billion rubles (for comparison, for the entire 2013 - 721.5 million).

=== Agriculture ===
Agriculture is the backbone of the region's economy. In 2018, the area of agricultural land was 106.2 thousand hectares, including arable land - 85.6 thousand hectares. The area allotted for growing grain crops was 137.7 thousand hectares in 2020. Spring wheat, winter rye, barley, oats, buckwheat, peas, sugar beets, and rape are cultivated in the district. The main livestock industries in the district are meat and dairy cattle breeding, pig breeding, and sheep breeding. In 2018, 64 farms were registered on the territory of the district. In the first half of 2020, the gross agricultural output of the district amounted to almost 609 million rubles, in 2013 this figure was 1.5 billion. The construction of "August-Muslum" livestock complex with an automatic milking system and a cross-ventilation system was started in 2019. As of November 2020, construction was still ongoing.

=== Investment potential ===
In the period from 2010 to 2020, the ratio of average monthly wages to the minimum consumer budget increased from 1.31 to 2.4 times. At the same time, in 2010 the average salary was about 9 thousand rubles while by 2012 it had increased to 13 thousand. The unemployment rate from 2010 to 2020 increased slightly from 0.97% to 1.08%.

According to the Committee of the Republic of Tatarstan on Socio-Economic Monitoring, investment in fixed assets (a full range of economic entities) amounted to almost 1.4 billion rubles in the period January-June 2020 in the Muslyumovsky district. This figure made up 0.7% of total investment in Tatarstan during this period. According to the Federal State Statistics Service of the republic, almost 158 million rubles of investment were attracted to the Muslyumovsky district in 2019 (except for budgetary funds and income from small businesses). In 2018 this figure was about 358 million. The majority of investment in 2020 was directed towards the development of agriculture, hunting and fishing (almost 745 million rubles), transportation and storage of goods (27 million), manufacturing (21 million).

=== Housing stock ===
Commissioning of residential buildings
	2018				2019				2020 (January-June)			
	sq.m	%	in Tatarstan		sq.m	%	in Tatarstan		sq.m	%	in Tatarstan	
	sq.m	%	sq.m	% of the district	sq.m	%	sq.m	% of the district	sq.m	%	sq.m	% of the district
Total	8036	100	2409949	0,33	9106	100	2675529	0,34	3714	100	1353428	0,27
Including companies and enterprises	-	-	1301195	-	-	-	1569808	-	-	-	551485	-
Including population	8036	100	1108754	0,72	9106	100	1105721	0,82	3714	100	801943	0,46

=== Transport ===
Roads of the regional or inter-municipal significance of the Republic of Tatarstan are Bolshoy Sukhoyash - Muslyumovo - Ursaevo, Almetyevsk - Muslyumovo, Muslyumovo - Tatarsky Shugan, Aktanysh - Muslyumovo, Almetyevsk - Muslyumovo - Staroye Baisarovo, Mustimlyumovo - Chalpyevo, Mustimlyumovo - Chalpy. There are no railways in the Muslyumovsky district.

== Ecology ==
Deciduous forests, pine forests and shrubland occupy about 17% of the district while another 9.3% is meadow-steppe vegetation. The district provides habitat for both forest and steppe animals. There are elk, wolf, forest ferret, badger, fox, white hare, common squirrel, red vole and European polecats in the forests of the district. The most common forest birds are black grouse, hawks, hooded crows, woodpeckers, cuckoos, magpies and eagle owls. Freshwater fish like bleak, bream, asp, sterlet, catfish, ide, crucian carp and rudd can be found in rivers in the district.

There is a state natural park of biological (botanical) profile "Narat-Astinsky bor" within the district. The park is located near the village of Naratasty and occupies an area of 468 hectares. The park itself is an old-growth pine forest of 100-120 years of age, and provides a habitat for more than 130 species of forest and forest-meadow plants, including protected varieties listed in the Red Book of Russia and Tatarstan. The park is also home to elk, wild boar, roe deer, foxes and European hedgehogs, as well as up to 27 bird species in the park.

== Social welfare and public life ==
The district has 16 secondary, 11 basic and 24 primary general education schools, a specialized lyceum, a correctional boarding school, and a secondary vocational school. Medical services are provided by a district hospital, a polyclinic, 40 obstetric points, and the Muslyumovsky boarding house for the elderly and disabled. Cultural resources in the district include the district House of Culture, 23 rural houses of culture, 19 village clubs, the central district library, the district children's library, 31 public libraries, and the local history museum. There are 36 mosques (three of them are in the village of Muslyumovo) and two churches in the district.

Numerous archaeological monuments of the Mesolithic, Chalcolithic, and Neolithic eras and Ananyino, Imenkovsky, Pianoborsky, Srubnaya cultures have been discovered in the district. There are also Bulgar monuments of the Golden Horde period. There are two cultural heritage sites of regional importance in the Muslyumovsky district: the ruins of the Catherine Bridge and a mosque dating from the second half of the 19th century in the village of Toygildino. In addition, there is a local history museum in the village. The Victory Memorial Complex of Military and Labor Glory with an eternal flame was opened in the village of Muslyumovo, in 2004.

The regional newspaper "Avyl utlary" ("Village Lights") has been published in Russian and Tatar since 1931. Its original name is "Kumek khuzhalyk". Since 1958 the paper had been called "Bairagy collective farm". The newspaper began publishing under its contemporary name in 1965. Since 1962, there has been radio broadcasting in the district. A television studio was opened in 1996. In 2003 all the regional media were united into the Muslyumovsky Information Editorial Center, which later became a branch of "Tatmedia" - "Muslyumovo-inform".
