= Aday, Aktanyshsky District =

Aday Адай
- selo
- Location within Tatarstan
- Country: Russia
- Region: Tatarstan
- District: Aqtanış District
- Time zone: UTC+3:00

Aday (Tatar: Адай, romanized: Aday) is a rural locality (a selo) in Aqtanış District, Tatarstan. The population was 254 as of 2010. Aday, Aktanyshsky District is located 35 km from Aqtanış, district's administrative centre, and 344 km from Qazan, republic's capital, by road. The earliest known record of the settlement dates from 1747. There are 4 streets in the village.
