= 2021 Menzelinsk Let L-410UVP-E crash =

Russian air crash

Coordinates: 55°44′N 53°07′E

2021 Menzelinsk parachute Let L-410UVP-E crash
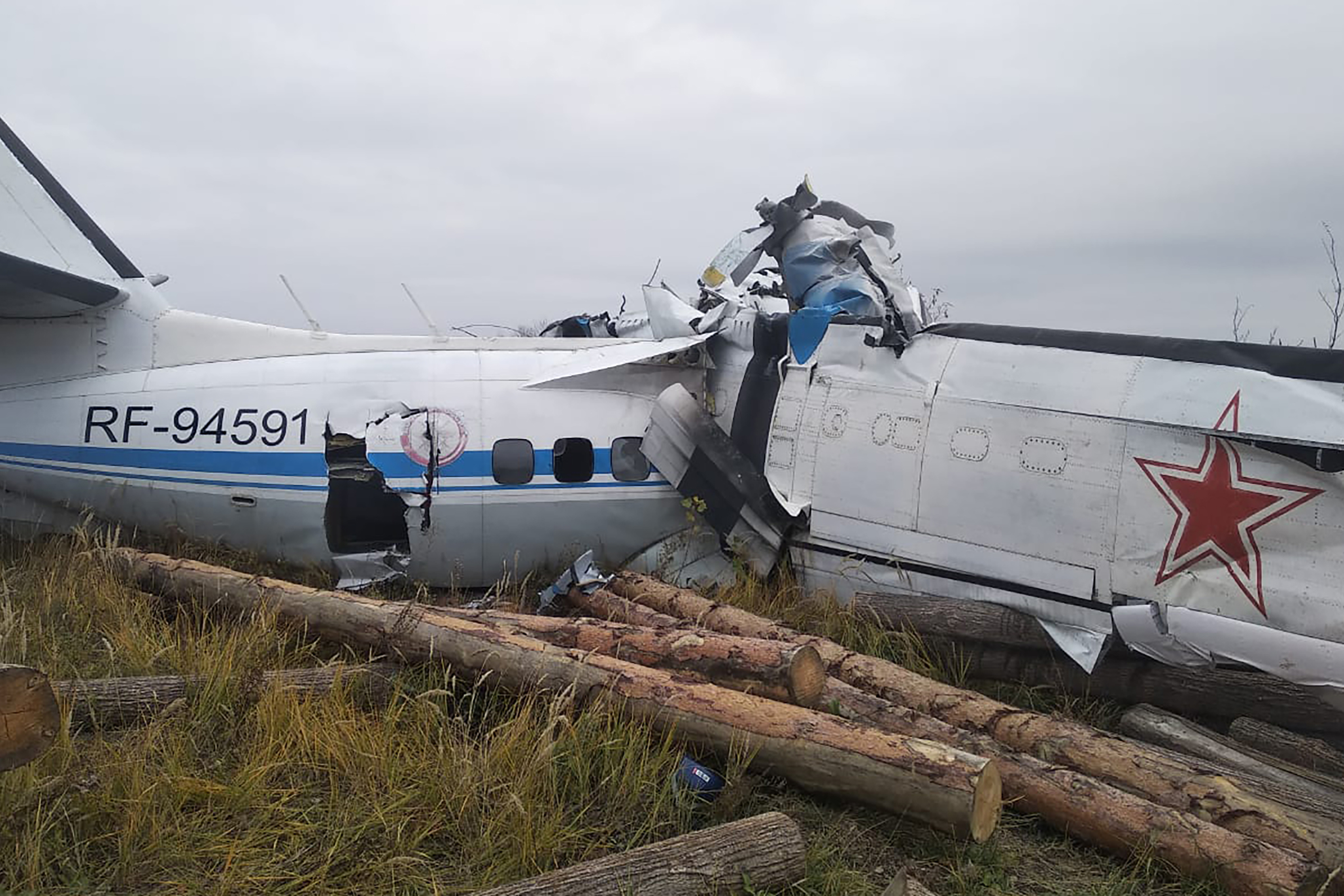
- The aircraft wreckage after the accident

Accident
- Date: 10 October 2021
- Summary: Crashed
- Site: near Menzelinsk Airport, Menzelinsk, Tatarstan, Russia

Aircraft
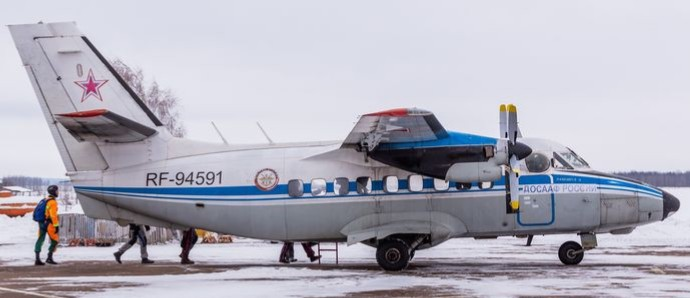
- RF-94591, the L-410 involved in the accident, pictured in 2019
- Aircraft type: Let L-410UVP-E
- Operator: DOSAAF of Russia
- Registration: RF-94591
- Flight origin: Menzelinsk Airport, Russia
- Destination: Menzelinsk Airport, Russia
- Occupants: 22
- Passengers: 20
- Crew: 2
- Fatalities: 17
- Injuries: 5
- Survivors: 5 (6 initially)

The 2021 Menzelinsk parachute Let L-410UVP-E crash occurred near the town of Menzelinsk, Tatarstan, Russia on 10 October 2021.

Immediately after taking off from the local airfield, the L-410 aircraft belonging to DOSAAF Russia began to lose altitude and crashed into the ground. 16 of the 22 people on board were killed, including both crew members and 14 parachutists, while 6 other parachutists survived, but 1 of them died 1 month later.

== Background ==
=== Aircraft ===
The plane was manufactured in March 1987 (serial number 18-26) and had the tail number 1826. It began to operate in 1987 in the Soviet Air Forces and the Russian Air Force. It was re-registered as RF-94591 in March 2009 and handed over to DOSAAF Russia on 8 September 2011.

=== Passengers and crew ===
At the time of the crash, there were 22 people on board. They included 60-year-old pilot Mikhail Belyaev and 61-year-old co-pilot Alexander Zykov, both of whom were killed in the crash.

== Accident ==
Video of the crash
- Video of the crash captured by CCTV

The aircraft took off at 09:05, but at an altitude of around 70 metres, the left engine failed. The crew attempted to turn back to the airfield. However, at 09:11 Moscow Time (12:11 UTC), the plane crashed into the ground in an industrial area to the southwest of Menzelinsk and about 1700 metres from the air traffic control at Menzelinsk airport. After hitting the ground, it collided with a GAZ car, firewood and a reinforced concrete wall, which destroyed the fuselage and wings but no fire followed.

== Investigation ==
The Central Interregional Investigative Directorate for Transport of the Investigative Committee of Russia began an investigation into the crash. A possible cause was overloading or failure of one of the engines.

== Aftermath ==
Rescue work began at the crash site, which was soon completed. A total of 47 people took part in the rescue effort. The Yuri Gagarin Cosmonaut Training Center suspended cooperation with the flying club in Menzelinsk while investigating the causes of the plane crash. The victims of the crash are planned to be sent to Moscow for treatment.

DOSAAF Russia has suspended flights of all its aircraft using the L-410. An aircraft of the same type, also operated by DOSAAF for parachute training, crashed in June of the same year.

== Reactions ==
=== Domestic ===
- The Superjet 100 aircraft EMERCOM of Russia flew to Naberezhnye Chelny to transport the victims to Moscow. On board was the First Deputy Minister of Emergency Situations Alexander Chupriyan.
- President of Tatarstan Rustam Minnikhanov instructed to prepare proposals for providing assistance to the families of those killed and injured in the crash and flew to the scene of the disaster. October 11 was declared a national day of mourning in Tatarstan.

=== International ===
- – The Ministry of Foreign Affairs of Azerbaijan expressed condolences in connection with the plane crash.
