= Kulyagash =

Wetland in Tatarstan

Coordinates: 55°43′53″N 54°05′26″E

The Kulyagash (name originates from the Mari language; Tatar: Көләгәш; Russian: Кулягаш) is the biggest wetland in Tatarstan, Russian Federation. It consists of Kulyagash swamp and several lakes. It is situated in Belaya and Ik Rivers interfluvial, Aktanyshsky District, at the east of Tatarstan, near the border with Bashkortostan. The area of the wetland is estimated as 22,000 ha. Kulyagash stretches from west to east 17.5 kilometers (10.9 mi), from north to south 10 kilometers (6.2 mi). The most notable lakes in the wetland are Atyr, Kinder-Kul, Azybeyevskoye, Syulyale-Kul, the biggest being, however elongate Kulyagash Lake. There are forests at the several islands in the swamp.

== Ecology ==
Since 1978 it is endangered by Nizhnekamsk Reservoir, which is now at 62 meters above sea level, but it is planned to fill it up to 68 to flood Kulyagash totally.

The wetland was formed by meandering Ik and Belaya. Several species of plants, such as Andromeda polifolia, Scheuchzeria palustrus, Oxicoccus palustrus, Eriophoeum vaginatum, Salix myrtilloides, mentioned in the local Red Book, as well as rare Najas major, Nymphaea alba, Nuphar pumila, Leersia oryzoides, Calamagrostis neglecta, C.phragmitoides, Ligularia sibirica and Betula humilis inhabit the area. Kulyagash is proposed to be included to Ramsar sites in Russia.

In 2001 the district government proposed the creation of Kulyagash reserve there, and in 2004 Tatarstan ministry of ecology promised to establish reserve there. However, in 2008 it was decided to fill the reservoir up to 68 m.

== Economy ==
Swamp's surface area, covered with peat is 4897 ha, 2774 of them are ultimate reserves. The mean thickness of peat is 1.32 m (the maximum is 4.5 m), total volume of peat is 36,624,000 m³.

== Human history ==
The archaeological excavations revealed scents of Bronze Age peoples in Kulyagash. Prior the 14th century the area was populated by Finno-Ugric peoples, but then was populated by Volga Bulgars and other Turkic peoples, developed to the modern Tatars and Bashkirs. Since late 16th century is also a home of the Eastern Mari and Russians. In the 19th century Derbeshkinsky settlement was founded at the north of the wetland. There were dockyards for the Kama river ships, until the settlement, as well as several surrounding villages was flooded in 1980s by reservoir.
