= Menzelinsky District =

Menzelinsky District Мензелинский район (Russian)
- District

Other transcription(s)
  - Tatar: Минзәлә районы
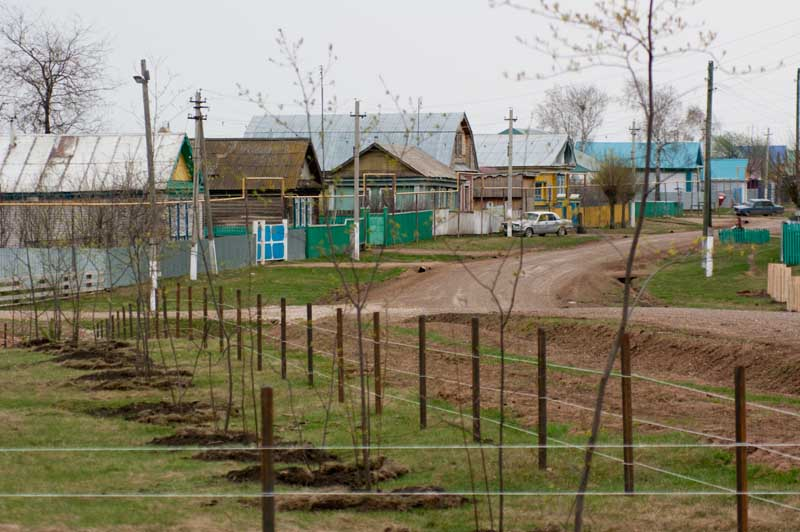
- Atryakle village, Menzelinsky District

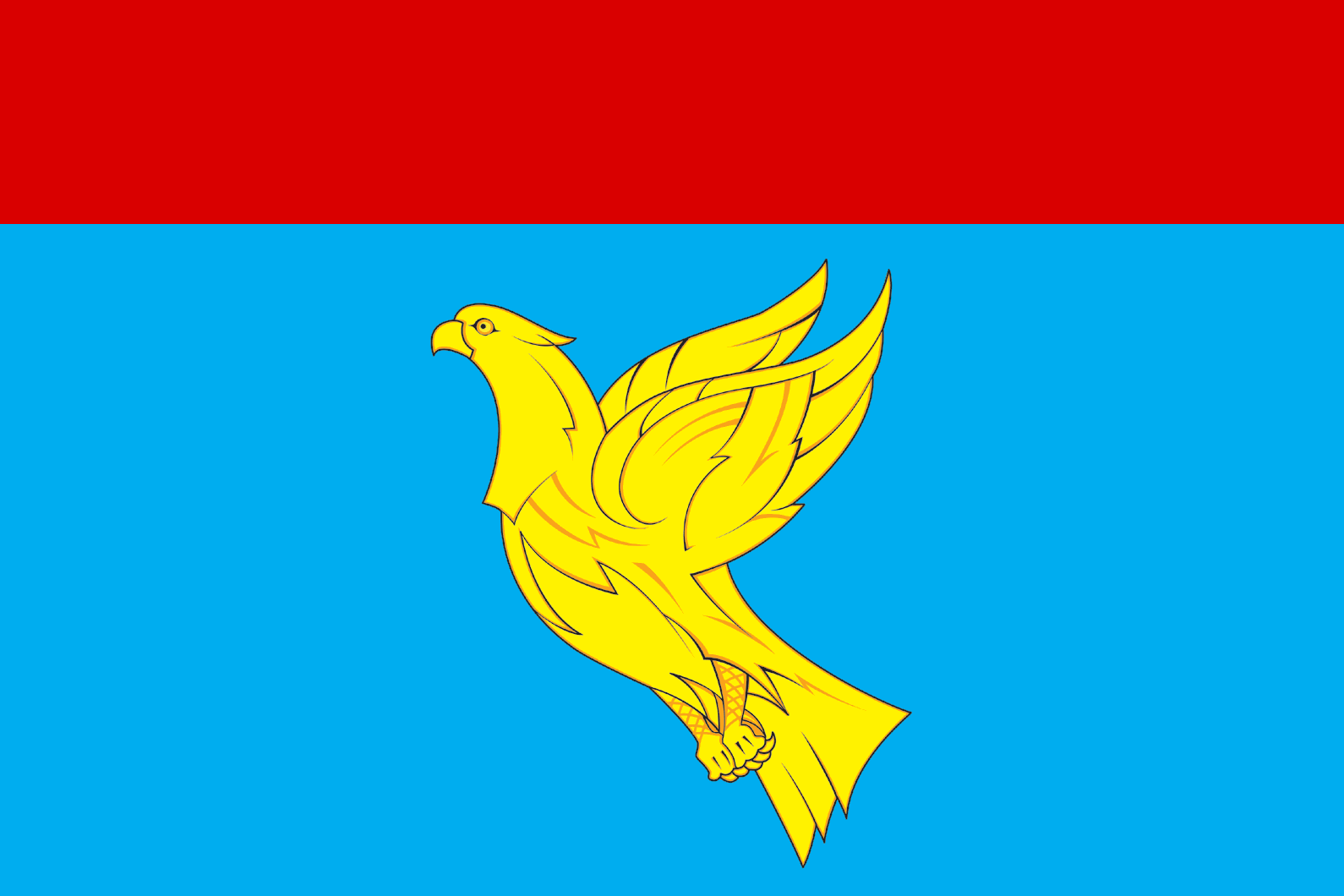
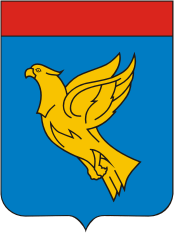
- Flag Coat of arms
- Location of Menzelinsky District in the Republic of Tatarstan
- Coordinates: 55°37′N 53°08′E
- Country: Russia
- Federal subject: Republic of Tatarstan
- Established: 10 August 1930
- Administrative center: Menzelinsk

Area
  - Total: 1,923.4 km^{2} (742.6 sq mi)

Population (2010 Census)
  - Total: 29,359
  - Density: 15.264/km^{2} (39.534/sq mi)
  - Urban: 56.1%
  - Rural: 43.9%

Administrative structure
  - Inhabited localities: 1 cities/towns, 69 rural localities

Municipal structure
  - Municipally incorporated as: Menzelinsky Municipal District
  - Municipal divisions: 1 urban settlements, 19 rural settlements
- Time zone: UTC+3 (MSK)
- OKTMO ID: 92640000
- Website: http://menzelinsk.tatarstan.ru/

Menzelinsky District (Russian: Мензели́нский райо́н; Tatar: Минзәлә районы) is a territorial administrative unit and municipal district of the Republic of Tatarstan within the Russian Federation. The district is located on the right bank of the Kama River, in the north-eastern part of the Republic of Tatarstan. The administrative center is Menzelinsk.

Initially, an outpost of Russian streltsy was located on the site of the modern district. The modern district was formed in 1930. The Menzelinsky district is known for being the residence of the poet and Hero of the Soviet Union Musa Cälil who lived there during the Great Patriotic War.

== Geography ==
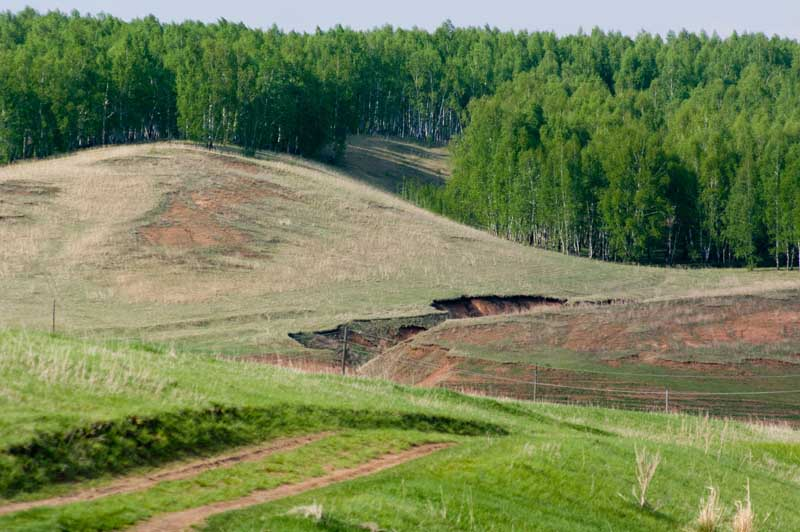
Village Atryakle

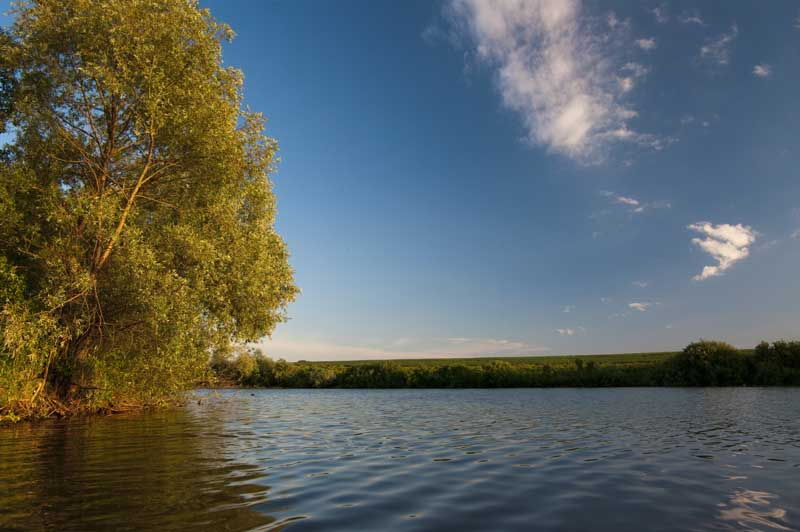
A lake in the village Atryakle

The Menzelinsky municipal district is located in the north-eastern part of the Republic of Tatarstan, on the right bank of the Kama. It is not far from the borders of Bashkortostan and Udmurtia. It is 290 kilometers from the capital of Tatarstan, Kazan. In the south, it borders with the Muslyumovsky District, in the west with the Tukayevsky District, in the south-west with the Sarmanovsky district, and in the east with the Aktanyshsky District. The administrative center of the district is Menzelinsk. The terrain of the district is predominantly flat with elevations of up to 300 meters in the west of the district. Part of the district's lands were submerged as a result of the creation of the Nizhnekamsk Reservoir. The land area of the district is 1919 km², which is 2.8% of the area of the entire Republic of Tatarstan. Arable land occupies about 45% of the district's territory, 24% meadows, 12% forests, 8% pastures. The average January temperature is -12.1°C. The average July temperature is +19.4°С

== Coat of arms and flag ==
The Council of the Menzelinsky Municipal District of the Republic of Tatarstan approved the modern coat of arms and flag on November 24, 2006. It is based on the historical coat of arms of the county town of Menzelinsk of 1781. The red stripe symbolizes the hard work, courage, and strength of local residents. The main color is azure, which means honor, spirituality, and nobility. The main figure is the golden gyrfalcon as the symbol of stability, intelligence, and respect. The flag of the Menzelinsky region is a rectangular blue cloth, 1/4 of which is occupied by a red stripe. Otherwise, it completely repeats the coat of arms.

== History ==
=== Background ===
Russian streltsy founded a prison on the territory of the modern Menzelinsky region in 1584. It was a former fortification on the border of the Russian and Bashkir lands. The fortress was named after the nearby river Menzel. The first prison included five towers. In the middle of the 17th century, the outpost was expanded, and it became the largest fortress on the Old Zakamskaya line. The fortress belonged to the Ufa province until 1708. Then the province was assigned to the Kazan Governorate. A wave of Bashkir rebellions happened across the country in 1735. Bashkir people were dissatisfied with the construction of the Orsk defensive line by the Russians. The Russian garrisons of Menzelinsk, Tabynsk, Ufa, and the Verkhne-Yaitskaya fortress were placed under siege. The Bashkirs failed to incite the Tatars, Mishar Tatars, Chuvash people, Mari people, Udmurt people into the uprising. As a result, the revolt was suppressed. The Commission of Bashkir Affairs had been located in Menzelinsk from 1735 to 1742 after which Menzelinsk was included in the newly formed Orenburg Governorate in 1743. The main trade routes including the Great Moscow Road ran through the fortress. Catherine the Great established the Ufa governorship of the Orenburg province, which included Menzelinsk in 1773. Menzelinsk received the status of a county town in 1781. The Ufa province was separated from the Orenburg province in 1865. Menzelinsky district remained in its composition until.

The territory of the Menzelinsky district was annexed to the Tatar Autonomous Soviet Socialist Republic as a canton in 1920. The canton was abolished and the Menzelinsky district was formed in its place in 1930. A part of the Matveyevsky district was added to Menzelinsky one in 1954.

=== Modernity ===
The Menzelinsky district has been headed by Giorgi Kupriyanov since 2006. He was appointed to the position of general director of the "Tatspirtprom" company in 2010. The position of the head of the district was taken by Rasim Sadykov, the former director of "Menzelinskagrokhimservice" until he resigned in 2013. The next head of the district was Aydar Salakhov, who was the Deputy Minister of Agriculture and Food of Tatarstan before.

== Population ==
At the beginning of 2020, 27,686 people live in the Menzelinsky district. By ethnic composition the population is divided as follows: 60.1% Tatars, 35.4% Russians, 0.45% Chuvash, 2.7% Mari people, and 1.35% other nationalities.

== Municipal-territorial structure ==
The Menzelinsky municipal district has 1 urban and 19 rural settlements with 70 settlements within them. The administrative centers of rural settlements are the villages: Atryakle, Ayu, Bikbulovo, Verkhniy Takermen, Staryy Irkenyash, Kadryakovo, Konovalovka, Kuzembet'yevo, Naratly-Kichu, Nikolayevka, Novoye Mazino, Novyy Mel'ken, Podgornyy Baylar, Staroye Mazino, Staraya Matveyevka, Urusovo, Yurtovo, Verkhniye Yushady, Vorovskogo, and the city of Menzelinsk.

== Economy ==
=== Industry ===
There are 5 large industrial enterprises in the Menzelinsky district: the branch of "Menzelinsky LVZ", the branch of "VAMIN", "Menzelinsky MSK", "Menzelinsky bakery", "Isiskatel plus" and the "Kuzembetyevsky mechanical repair plant".

The Menzelinsky Mechanical Plant developed an investment project for the production of aviation, automobile, tractor, construction and railway components that meet world standards and with a capacity of 30 to 70 thousand units per year in 2009. The estimated cost of the project was 6 billion rubles. The general director of the plant asked the President of the Republic of Tatarstan for help in securing financing for the project in 2014.

A holding of four companies was created in the region to work in the field of oilfield services in 2012. Its parent company is "Menzelinsk-Service". The company prepares fields for petroleum production. The main customers of the company were "Lukoil" and "Gazprom" for 2017. The holding contributes 500-600 thousand rubles a year to the budget of Menzelinsk through property taxes alone. In general, annual payments of the holding to the city budget amounted to 10-15 million rubles. The company invested about 48 million rubles in the development of the district until 2017. These funds were used for preschool institutions, two churches, and a secondary school. An industrial site "Promzona-Menzelinsk" was opened in the Menzelinsky district on 3 hectares in 2019. It specializes in the production of furniture. Three companies became domiciles. State support programs are available for them. In particular, subsidies of up to 10 million rubles for the construction or reconstruction of production facilities, and the purchase of new equipment were offered. In addition to this park, an industrial park "Izyskatel" operates in the region. It has seven residents for 2020.

The gross product of the district amounted to 2.8 billion rubles in the period January-September 2020.

=== Agriculture ===
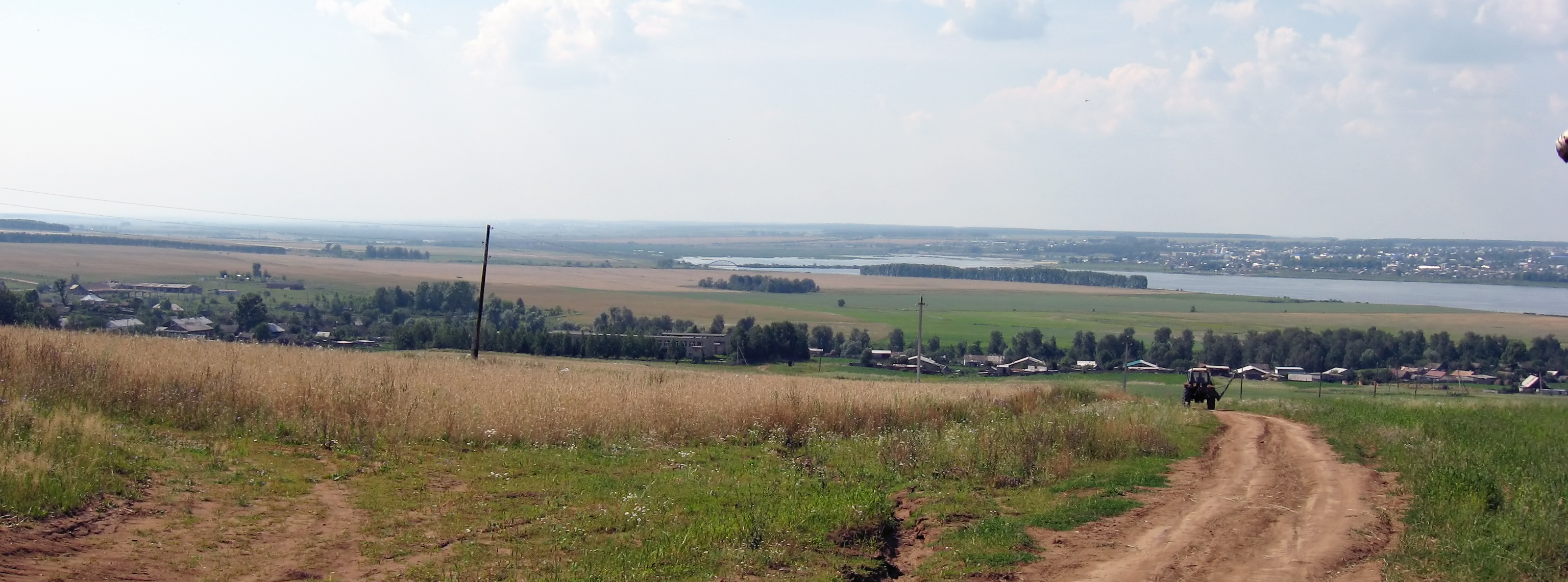
The village of the Vorovsky state farm

The agricultural sector is well developed in the Menzelinsky district. There were 82 economic entities, of which 58 were farms in this industry in 2019. 97.7 thousand hectares of land are occupied, including 86.1 thousand hectares of arable land, 2.7 thousand hectares of hayfields and 8.9 thousand hectares of pastures. Spring wheat, winter rye, barley, oats, buckwheat, peas, and millet are cultivated in the region. The Menzelinsky district has been among the regional leaders in terms of harvests. The main branches of pastoral farming are meat and dairy cattle breeding, sheep breeding. The Menzelinsky district occupies a leading place in the sowing of wheat among the regions of the northeastern Trans-Kama region of Tatarstan (Aktanyshsky, Zainsky district, Muslyumovsky and Chelninsky districts). The federal company "August" bought two agricultural firms and 14 thousand hectares of land in the region in 2019. It plans to build a robotic milking complex for 2.4 thousand head of cattle in the district. A similar complex for 1.2 thousand heads was sold by the same company in the Muslyumovsky district. Investments of it amounted to 1.1 billion rubles.

The company "Kamsky Bacon" bought out 6,000 hectares of land in the region for the construction of an agricultural complex for breeding cattle. It was designed for 2.4 thousand animals. The company has already invested 1 billion rubles. The project plans another 800 million in future investment. "Kamsky Bacon" intended to build a second complex by 2021, however implementation was hampered by a conflict between the company and its shareholders. Shareholders are unhappy that "Kamsky Bacon" is not ready to pay rent private land with feed for livestock in accordance with the recommendations of the Ministry of Agriculture of the Republic. The company plans to pay only in money and only 800 rubles per hectare per year. The situation remains unresolved as of 2020.

The total volume of investment in the district, excluding budgetary funds, amounted to 858 million rubles in January-June. The gross agricultural output of the district was 382 million rubles in the same period.

=== Транспорт ===
The main roads in the district are the M7 highway, Menzelinsk - Russky Karan - Togashevo, Bolshoye Nurkeevo - Kadryakovo, Menzelinsk - Byurgan and Menzelinsk - Kuzeyevo - Naberezhnye Chelny. As the district is located on the bank of the Nizhnekamskoye reservoir, its water routes also go to Menzelinsk. There are three urban public transport routes (to the villages of Neftyanikov and Izyskateli) and 6 suburban routes on the territory of the Menzelinsky district [6]. Transport services are provided by the "Menzelinskoe ATP. Major repairs began on the Menzelinsk - Russky Karan - Togashevo highway within the framework of the "Safe and High-Quality Roads National Project in 2020. The allocated budget is 80 million rubles.

== Ecology ==
About 11.1% of the territory of the Menzelinsky district is forested land. The main forest-forming species are linden, oak, aspen, and birch. 993 species of flora and 302 species of fauna were listed in the district. Its territory is inhabited by representatives of endangered animal species listed in the Red Book Data of Taratsan. The second regional natural monument is the low-water Menzelya river. The total length of the river is 123 km.

== Social and Cultural Resources ==
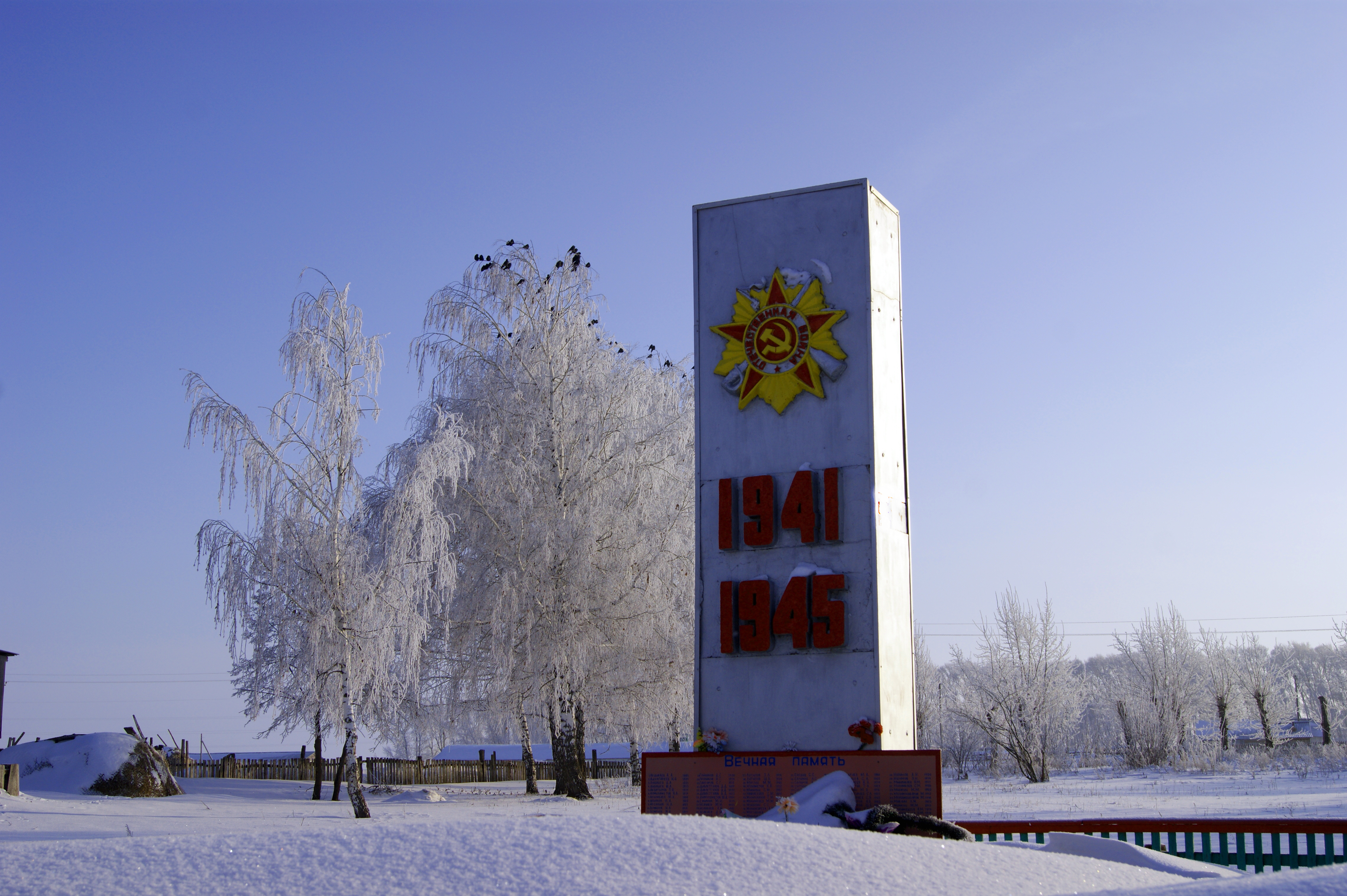
Monument to those killed in WWII

The region is served by 25 educational institutions, a Cadet school, a Tatar gymnasium, a special (correctional) general education boarding school, and 31 preschool educational institutions worked in 2019. Additionally, there is a pedagogical college, an agricultural technical school, and a medical school among secondary specialized educational institutions.

There are 21 monuments in the Menzelinsky district. The cathedral mosque was built in 1910 and is now designated as an object of cultural heritage of regional (republican) significance. Before its appearance, the Muslims of Menzelinsk conducted rituals in a prayer house. Muslims received permission to build a mosque after several unsuccessful attempts in 1907. The decorative design of the mosque combines elements of Tatar national architecture, classicism and oriental motives.

The house where the Hero of the Soviet Union, the poet Musa Cälil studied, is also a cultural heritage of regional significance. The building was a pedagogical school in 1914-1920. A memorial museum was opened in the city in 1970. A bust of the hero was installed in the Menzelinsky Park named after Cälil with the participation of the poet's daughter in 2017
