= Akhunovo, Aktanyshsky District, Republic of Bashkortostan =

Axun Ахун
- derevnya
- Location within Tatarstan
- Country: Russia
- Region: Tatarstan
- District: Aqtanış District
- Time zone: UTC+3:00

Axun (Tatar: Ахун, romanized: Axun) is a rural locality (a derevnya) in Aqtanış District, Tatarstan. The population was 245 as of 2010. Axun, Aktanyshsky District is located 28 km from Aqtanış, district's administrative centre, and 356 km from Qazan, republic's capital, by road. The village was established in 18th century. There are 4 streets in the village.
