= Alfiya Avzalova =

Alfiya Avzalova Әлфия Афзал кызы Авзалова HAR
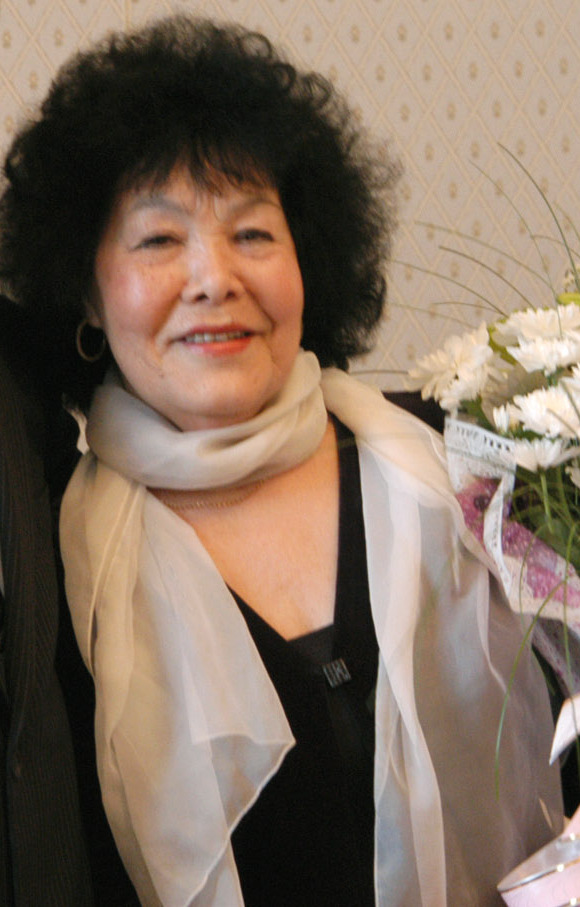

Background information
- Born: 15 January 1933; Aktanyshsky District
- Died: 15 June 2017 (aged 84) Kazan
- Formerly of: Tatar State Philharmonic Society; Tatghost Philharmonic; Kazan Utlary

Avzalova Alfiya Avzalovna (Tatar: Әлфия Афзал кызы Авзалова; 15 January 1933 — 15 June 2017) was a Soviet and Russian singer. She was an Honored Artist of the Tatar Autonomous Soviet Socialist Republic, People's Artist of the Tatar ASSR, Honored Artist of the RSFSR, soloist of the Tatar Philharmonic Society, and laureate of the State Prize of the Republic of Tatarstan.

== Life ==
Alfia Avzalova was born in the village of Aktanysh, in the Aktanyshsky District of the Republic of Tatarstan. She became an orphan: when her mother died, and father died in the Great Patriotic War. Alfia was brought up by her mother's sister.

In 1957, she became a soloist of the Tatar State Song and Dance Ensemble, and performed works of Soltan Ğäbäşi, A. Klyucharev, Mansur Muzafarov, Z. Khabibullin and many other composers. Her repertoire included ancient and modern folk songs. She studied with Raisa Volkova — then she worked as an art director of the Tatar State Philharmonic Society.

After a year of work in the ensemble, Alfia Avzalova entered the music school. Then, on the recommendation of the artistic management of the Tatghost Philharmonic, Alfiya Avzalova created her own concert group, which included the instrumental ensemble "Kazan utlary", consisting of organ, guitar, keyboard and synthesizer under the direction of Karim Gabidullin, and also a dance group.

Together with this ensemble, Alfia Avzalova toured the Republics of Central Asia and the Baltic States, visited Moscow, Leningrad and many cities of Russia.. For every tour, which could last two or three months, she gave more than 100 concerts.

The first great success of the singer has won on performance on the Decade of the Tatar art and the literature in Moscow in 1957.

Alfia Avzalova died at the age of 85 in Kazan.

== Awards ==
- Honored Artist of the Tatar ASSR (1962)
- People's Artist of the Tatar ASSR (1970)
- Two Orders of the Red Banner of Labor (the first time — in 1976)
- Honored Artist of the RSFSR (1983)
- Ğabdulla Tuqay Award (1992)
- The Honorary Diploma of the Soviet Peace Committee "For active work to strengthen peace among nations" (1960)
- Honorary prize — "The Legend of the Tatar Variety" (2008)
