= Muslyumovo, Muslyumovsky District, Republic of Tatarstan =

Rural locality in the Republic of Tatarstan, Russia

Coordinates: 55°18′12″N 53°11′51″E

Muslyumovo (Russian: Муслюмово, Tatar: Мөслим) is a rural locality (a selo) and the administrative center of Muslyumovsky District of the Republic of Tatarstan, Russia. Population: 7,348 (2010 census); 7,392 (2002 census); 6,206 (1989 Soviet census).
