= Boarding School of Humanities for Gifted Children in Aktanysh =

Gymnasium in Tatarstan, Russia

Boarding School of Humanities for Gifted Children
- Сәләтле балалар өчен гуманитар гимназия-интернат (Tatar)
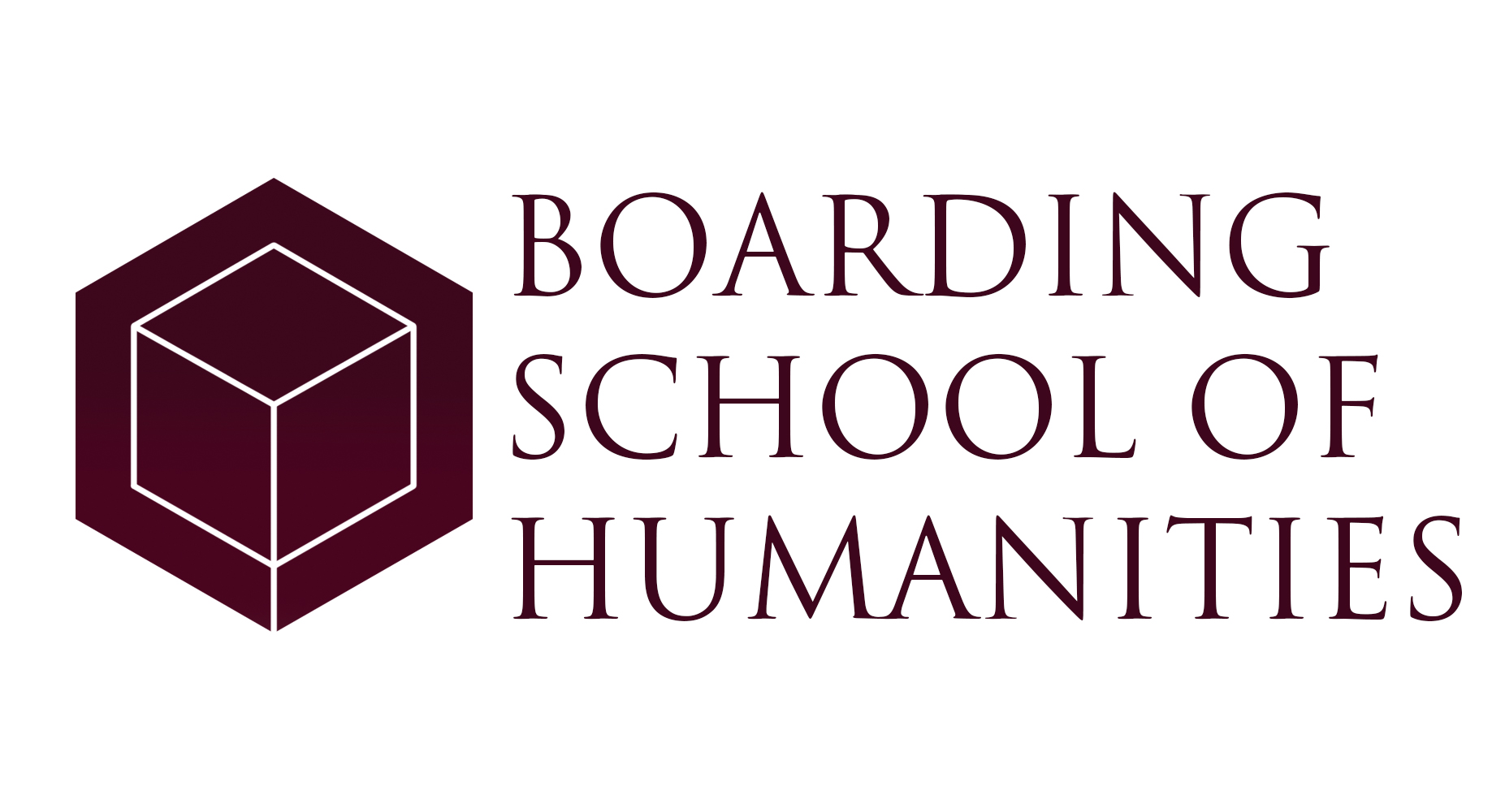

Location
- 3A, Aeroportovskaya Street; Aktanysh, Republic of Tatarstan; Russia
- Coordinates: 55.705248°N 54.062103°E

Information
- Other name: Gymnasium–Boarding School of the Humanities for Gifted Children
- Former name: Aktanysh gymnasium
- Type: State autonomous secondary school
- Motto: Милләтнең киләчәк лидерлары (Future leaders of the nation)
- Established: 1 September 2005
- Founder: Republic of Tatarstan
- Principal: Ruzilya Garipova
- Staff: 25
- Grades: from 5 to 11
- Gender: mixed
- Age range: 11-18
- Enrollment: 156 (= 2019)
- Language: Tatar, Russian
- Campus size: 6 ha
- Campus type: suburban
- Colors: Burgundy and white
- Accreditation: Department of Supervision and Control in Education of the Republic of Tatarstan
- Newspaper: Ak cilkän
- Website: tbsh.org

The Boarding School of Humanities for Gifted Children (Tatar: Сәләтле балалар өчен гуманитар гимназия-интернат, Russian: Гуманитарная гимназия-интернат для одаренных детей) is a Tatar state gymnasium (secondary school) and boarding school located in Aktanysh, Tatarstan, Russia. Founded in 2005 as a municipal school, the status was changed in 2011. Unlike other secondary schools in Republic of Tatarstan, it is managed at the state rather than municipal level and is directly subordinate to the Ministry of Education and Science of Republic of Tatarstan.

All programs follow state educational standards. The school has exchange programs with other educational institutions of different countries.

== Gallery ==
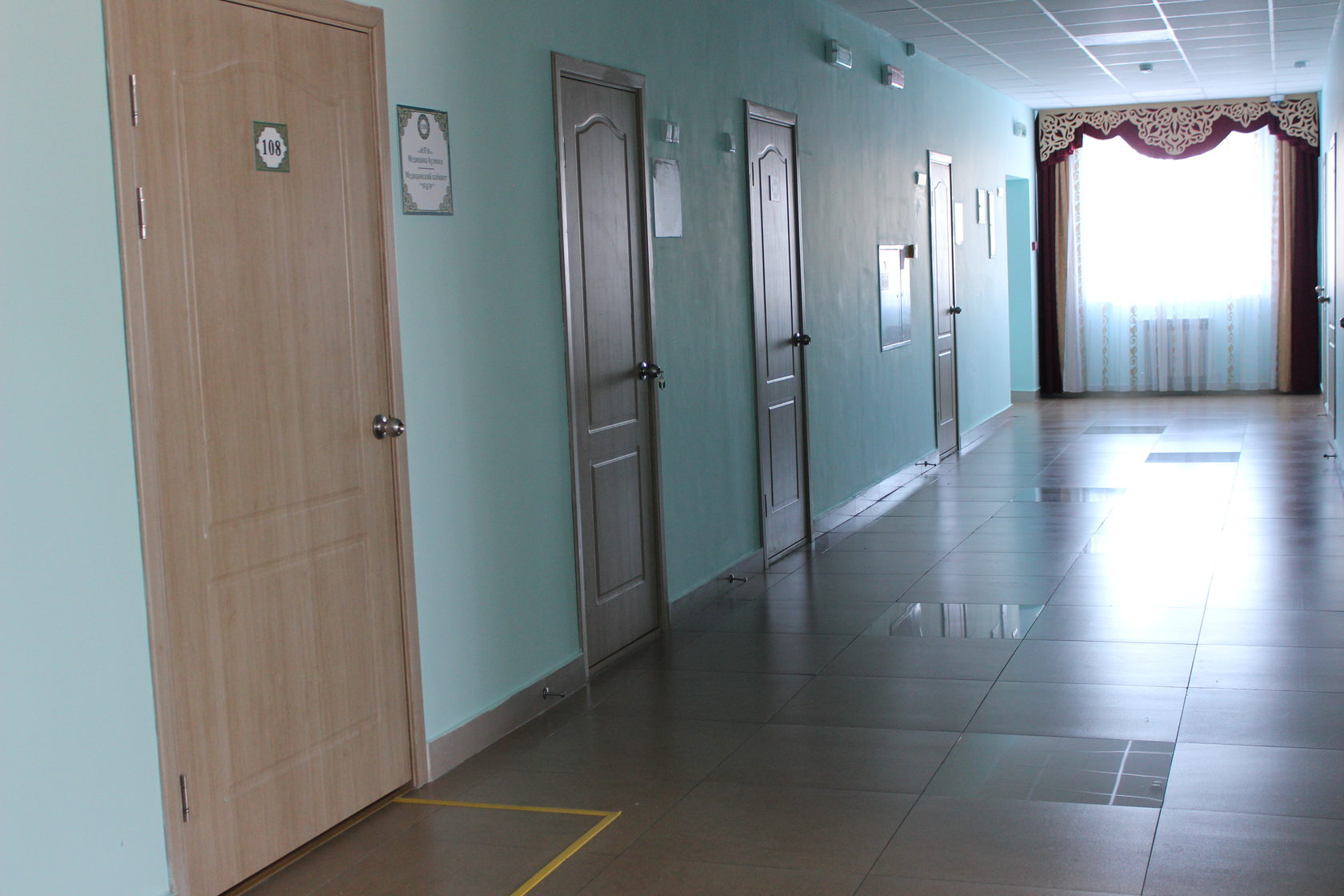

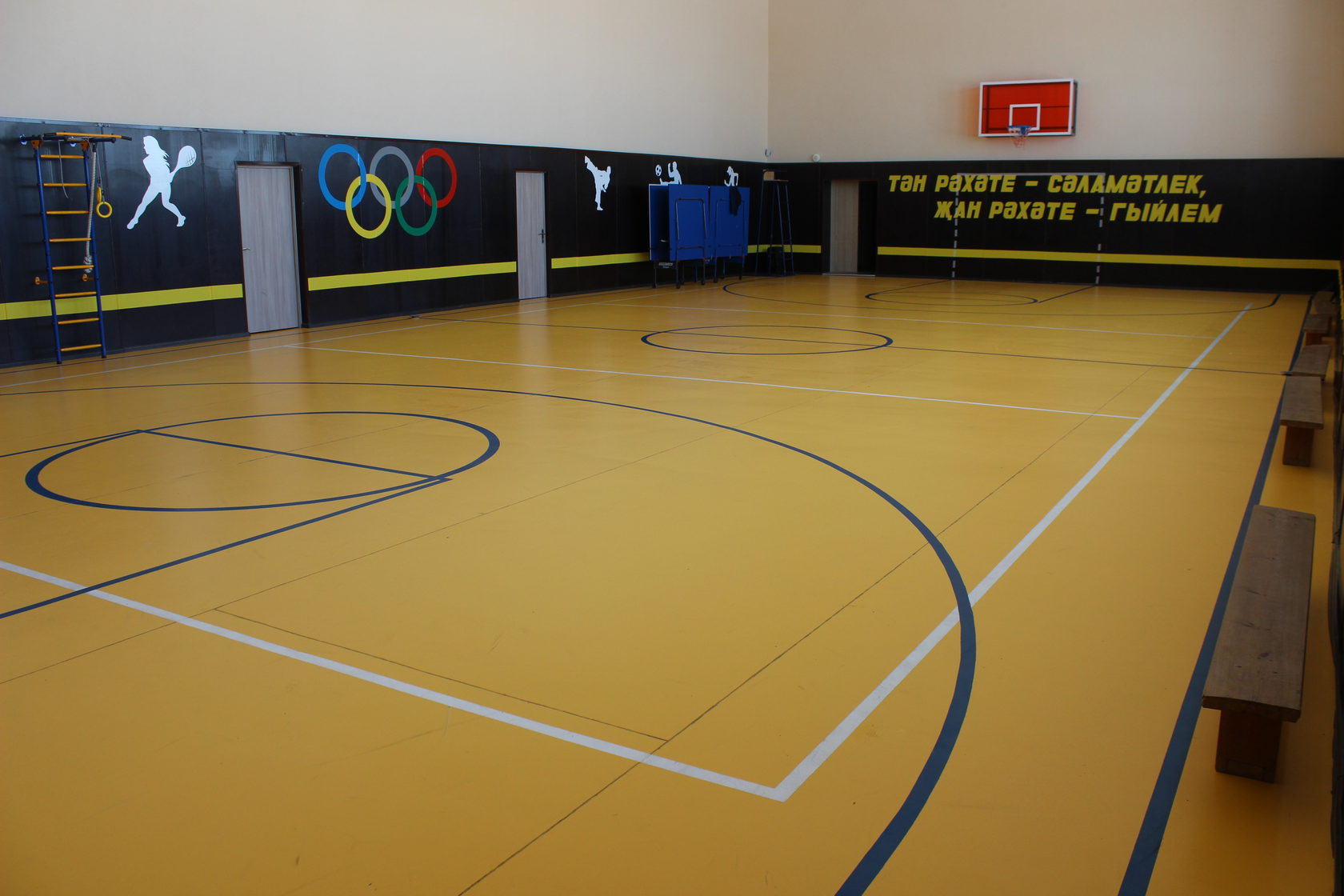

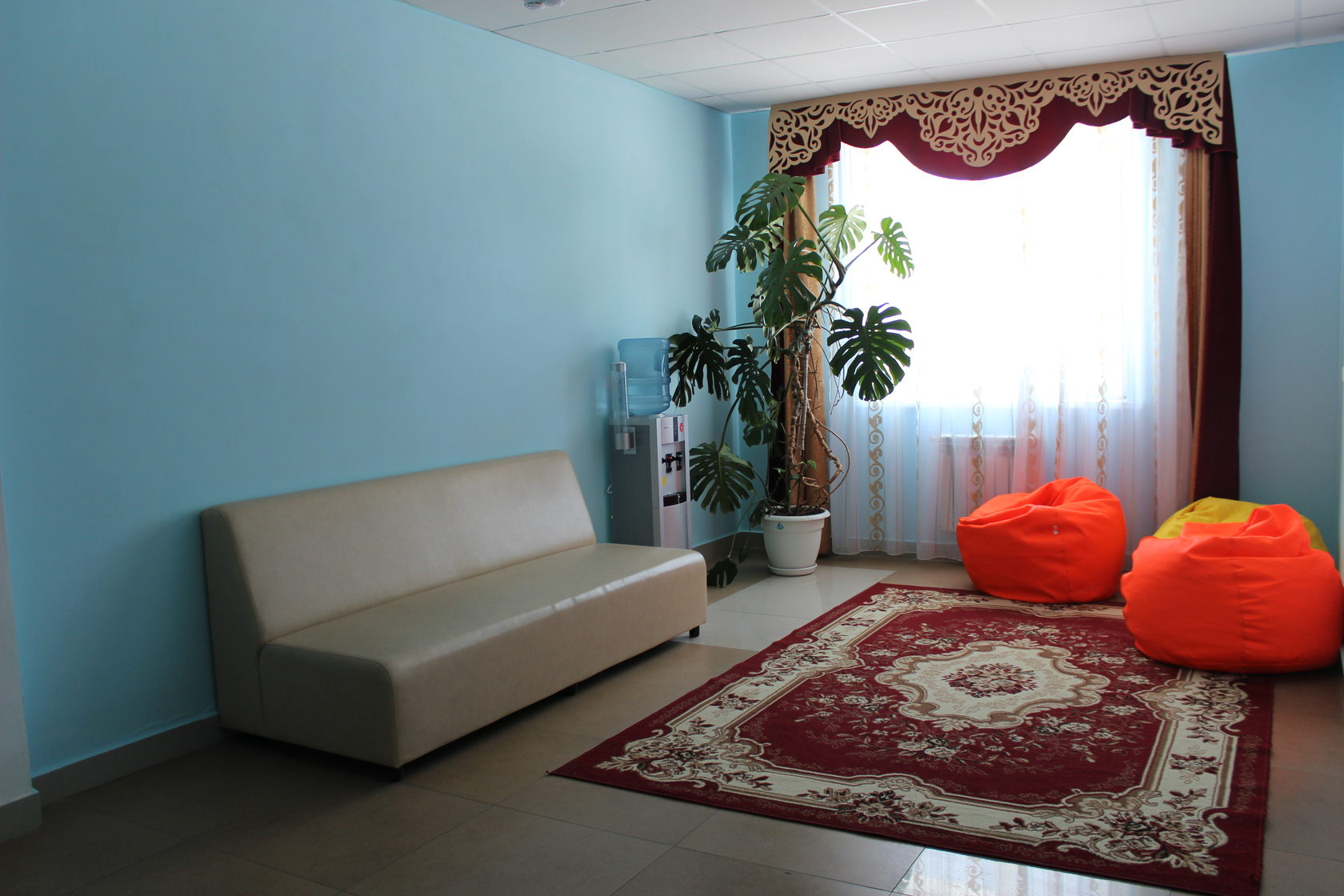

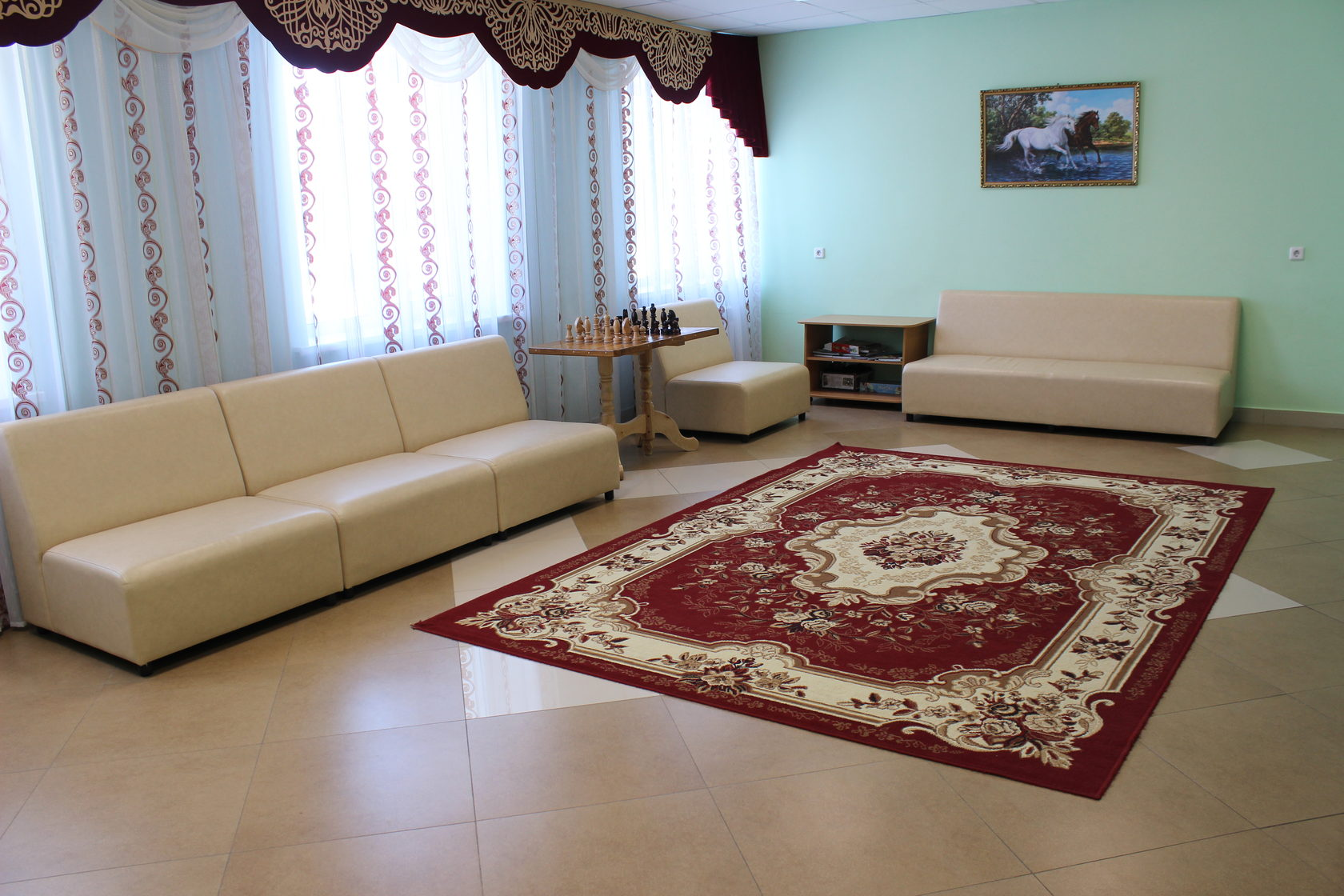

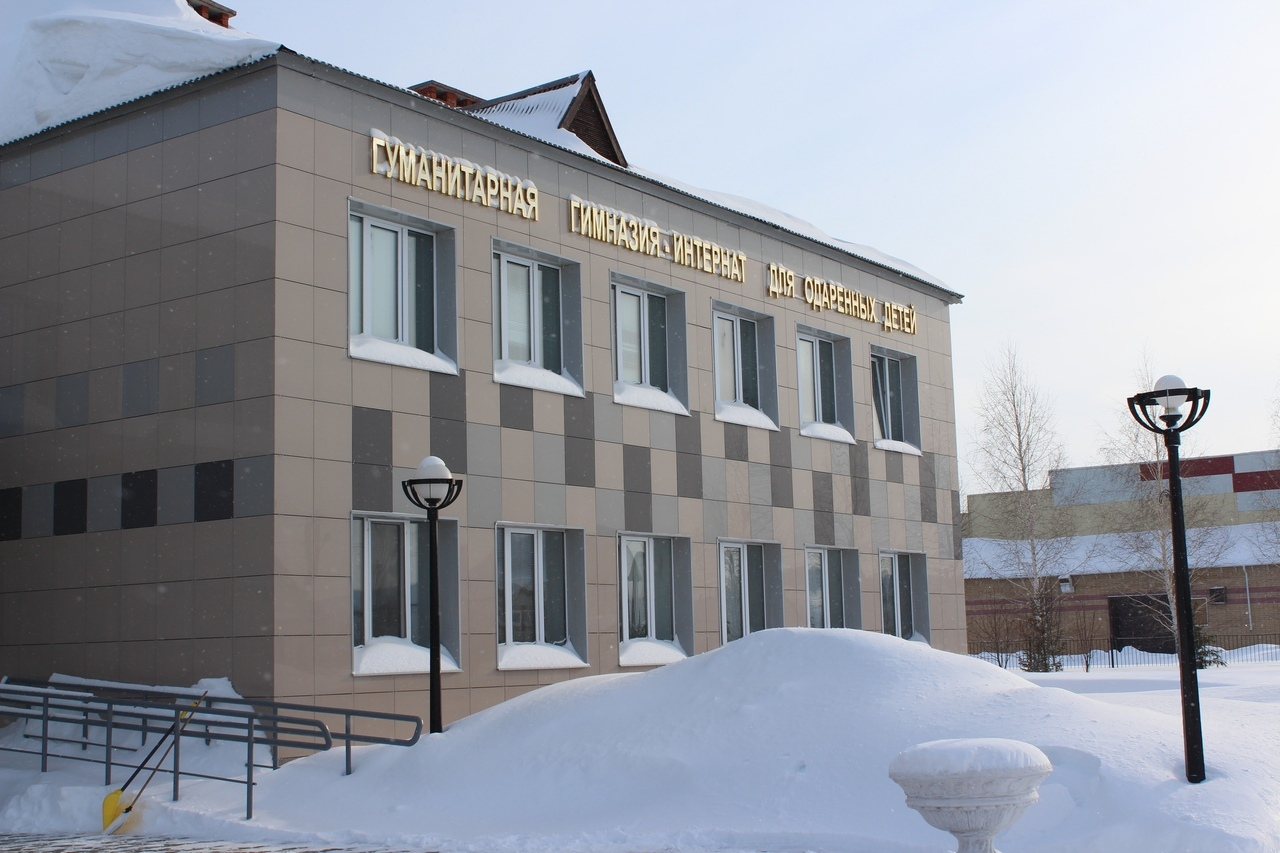
