= Menzelinsk Airport =

Menzelinsk Мензелинск
- IATA: none; ICAO: UWKP

Summary
- Airport type: Public
- Location: Menzelinsk
- Elevation AMSL: 322 ft / 98 m
- Coordinates: 55°43′12″N 53°3′36″E
- Interactive map of Menzelinsk

Runways
Direction	Length		Surface
Direction	ft	m	Surface
02 / 20	4,101	1,250	Asphalt

Menzelinsk is an airport in Russia located 3 km west of Menzelinsk, in the Kama river valley. It is a civilian airfield with small tarmac.

== Menzelinsk drop zone ==
Menzelinsk airport is currently known as Menzelinsk drop zone. It operate two turboprop aircraft -- L-410 and An-28, and a number of smaller aircraft, like An-2. There is a hotel, canteen, rent and a heated packing rooms.

The first parachute jump can be performed with static-line Soviet parachute D-6, or a modern free-fall tandem jump. There is an Accelerated Free Fall program to advance and a series of special courses for Tandem Masters, AFF instructors and wingsuit instructors.

Landing area for parachuting is 1700×800 meters.

=== World Championships 2010 ===
World parachuting championships 2010 in formation skydiving, canopy formation and artistic events (freestyle and freefly) were held from 29 July to 5 August 2010.

== Incidents and accidents ==
- On October 10, 2021, a Let-410 aircraft belonging to an air club crashed upon take-off from the airport, killing 16 (initially, 19 were reported dead) and injuring 3.

== See also ==
- List of airports in Russia
