= Akhunovo, Davlekanovsky District, Republic of Bashkortostan =

Akhunovo Ахуново
- Village
- Location within Bashkortostan Location within Russia
- Coordinates: 54°14′N 54°43′E
- Country: Russia
- Region: Bashkortostan
- District: Davlekanovsky District
- Time zone: UTC+5:00

Akhunovo (Russian: Ахуново; Bashkir: Ахун, Axun) is a rural locality (a village) in Mikyashevsky Selsoviet, Davlekanovsky District, Bashkortostan, Russia. The population was 72 as of 2010. There is 1 street.

== Geography ==
Akhunovo is located 25 km west of Davlekanovo (the district's administrative centre) by road. Gorchaki is the nearest rural locality.
