= Staroyanzigitovo =

Staroyanzigitovo Староянзигитово
- Selo
- Location within Bashkortostan Location within Russia
- Coordinates: 55°47′N 54°06′E
- Country: Russia
- Region: Bashkortostan
- District: Krasnokamsky District
- Time zone: UTC+5:00

Staroyanzigitovo (Russian: Староянзигитово; Bashkir: Иҫке Йәнйегет, İśke Yänyeget) is a rural locality (a selo) in Novoyanzigitovsky Selsoviet, Krasnokamsky District, Bashkortostan, Russia. The population was 529 as of 2010. There are 11 streets.

== Geography ==
Staroyanzigitovo is located 51 km south of Nikolo-Beryozovka (the district's administrative centre) by road. Bachkitau is the nearest rural locality.
