= Aktanyshsky District =

Aktanyshsky District Актанышский район (Russian)
- District

Other transcription(s)
  - Tatar: Актаныш районы
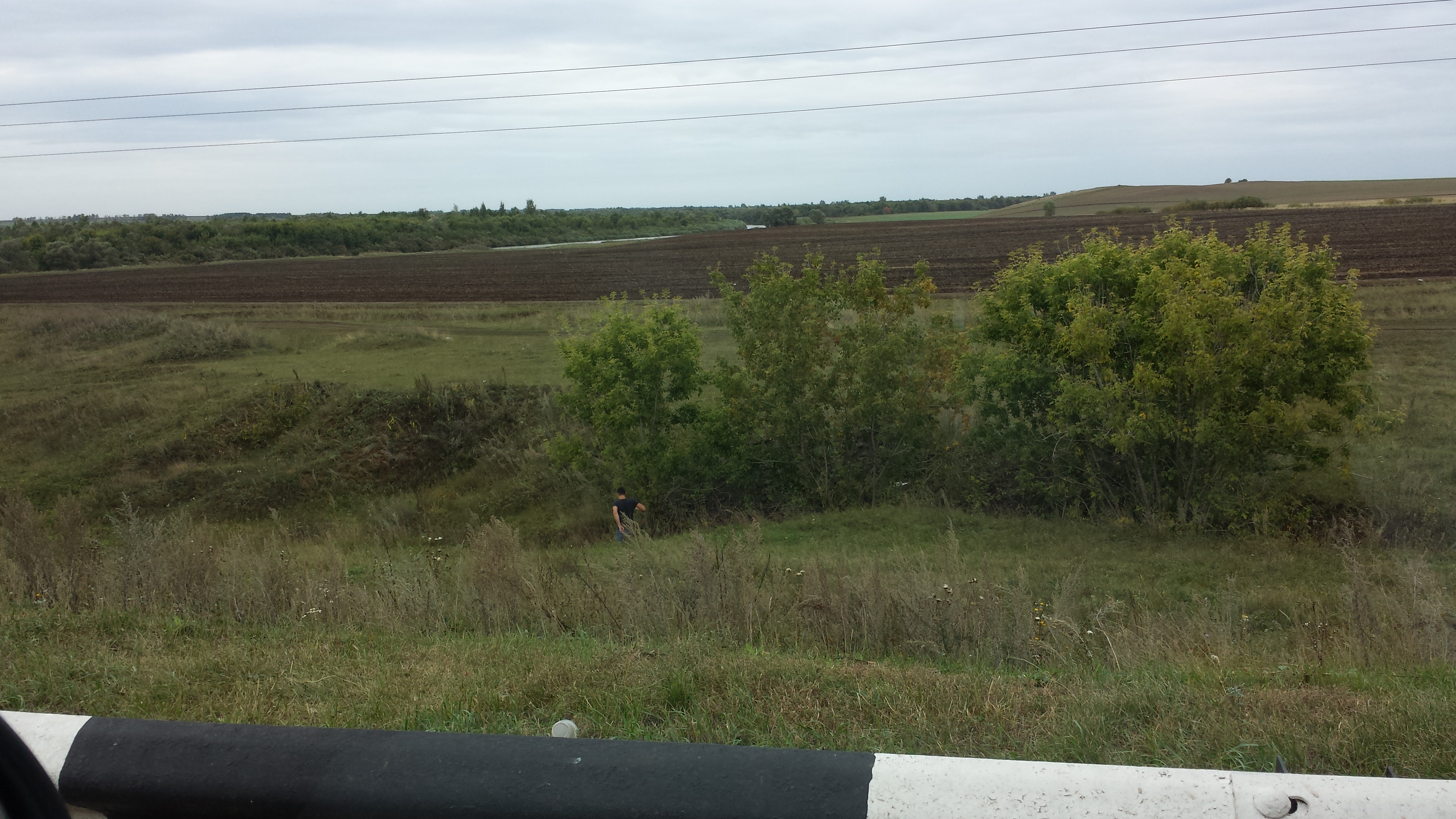
- Landscape in Aktanysksky District

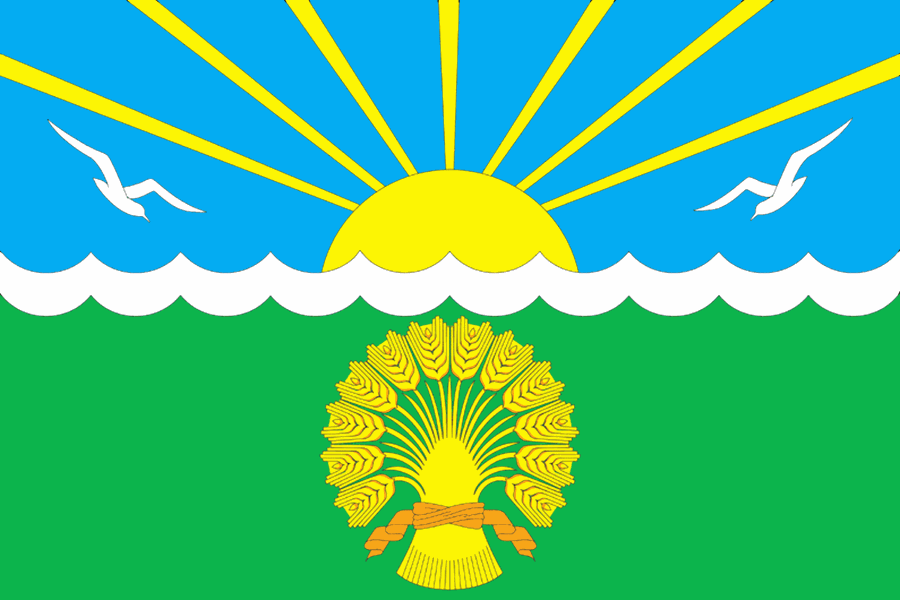
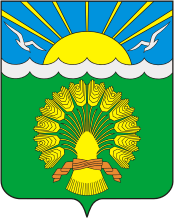
- Flag Coat of arms
- Location of Aktanyshsky District in the Republic of Tatarstan
- Coordinates: 55°41′N 53°51′E
- Country: Russia
- Federal subject: Republic of Tatarstan
- Established: 10 August 1930
- Administrative center: Aktanysh

Area
  - Total: 2,037.8 km^{2} (786.8 sq mi)

Population (2010 Census)
  - Total: 31,971
  - Density: 15.689/km^{2} (40.634/sq mi)
  - Urban: 0%
  - Rural: 100%

Administrative structure
  - Inhabited localities: 88 rural localities

Municipal structure
  - Municipally incorporated as: Aktanyshsky Municipal District
  - Municipal divisions: 0 urban settlements, 26 rural settlements
- Time zone: UTC+3 (MSK)
- OKTMO ID: 92605000
- Website: http://aktanysh.tatarstan.ru

Aktanyshsky District (Russian: Актанышский район; Tatar: Актаныш районы) is an territorial administrative unit and municipal district of the Republic of Tatarstan within the Russian Federation. The district is located in the north-east of the republic.

The administrative centre of the district is the village of Aktanysh. The district was officially formed in 1930. The district was abolished in 1963 as a result of the consolidation of the administrative units of the TASSR, and its territories were transferred to the Menzelinsky District. However, by January 12, 1965, the district had been reconstituted. At the beginning of 2020, there were 29,384 people living in the district. The population of the district is composed mainly of rural residents.

The district economy is mainly based on the agricultural sector. Deposits belonging to the Aktanysh oil field have been developed on the territory of the region since 1995. Since 2017, the Aktanysh industrial park with an area of 13 hectares has been in operation.

== Geography ==
The district borders on the Menzelinsky and Muslyumovsky districts of the republic of Bashkortostan (Ilishevsky, Krasnokamsky, Bakalinsky districts, and Agidel districts) as well as the (Karakulinsky District) of Udmurtia.

One of the largest rivers in Europe, the Kama and its tributary the Belaya river flow through the region. The topography of the district is a rolling, gently sloping plain with an elevation range from 62 to 235 m and prevailing heights of 120–140 m. The lowest points in the district are at the surface of the Nizhnekamsk Reservoir, along the flooded floodplains of the Kama, Belaya and Ik. The highest points are located in the southern part of the district. The highest terrain feature in the district marked at 235m is located south of the village of Poisevo.

The region is characterized by a moderate continental climate with warm summers and moderately cold winters. Weather in the region is formed mainly under the influence of the westward movement of air masses. Warm and humid air masses moving from the Atlantic Ocean moderate the local climate. Cold air currents reach the region from the Arctic Ocean and in winter the cold continental air of less temperate latitudes often enters the region. Warmer tropical air currents enter the region from the southwest and south, and in summer coming from the southeast.

== Coat of arms ==
The coat of arms and flag represent the main geographic and economic features of the region. For instance, a rising sun indicates the eastern location of the region, and also symbolizes longevity, activity, strength and hard work; two gulls and a wavy strip show the special role of rivers, lakes and reservoirs for the region, and their silver color is a symbol of purity, perfection, peace and mutual understanding. The basis of the region's economy is agriculture, which is reflected in a sheaf of twelve ears of grain, according to the number of months in a year, which symbolizes the full annual agricultural cycle. The same symbol shows the rural districts that are part of the district. Also, a sheaf is a traditional symbol of fertility, friendship, community of interests, endurance. The golden color symbolizes harvest, wealth, stability, respect; green - a symbol of health, nature, growth in life; blue - honor, nobility, spirituality.

The flag of the Aktanysh region is a rectangular panel which is divided horizontally into three stripes: wide blue, the narrowest white and green.

== History ==
=== Background ===
Finno-Ugric peoples once lived on these lands. This is evidenced by archaeological materials from the Bronze Age discovered near Pianbor, as well as burial grounds of the villages of Taktalachuk, Chiyalek, Tatarsky Azibey, Semiostrov, Yamaly, Masady, Garay, Ilchebay, Irmyashevo, Aktanysh, Karach and Shabyzovo.

After the forces of Ivan the Terrible conquered the Khanate of Kazan, these lands were reassigned to the Menzelinsky governor of the Kazan order (as the local administrative body was called in the 16th-17th centuries). After 1708, the territory was part of the Kazan Governorate, became part of the Ufa province from 1719, and from 1728 belonged to the governor of Kazan. Starting in 1735, the district was part of the Bashkir commission until it ended up in the Orenburg Governorate in 1744. It would remain in the governorate until 1781 when it was subordinated to the Ufa Governorate. In 1796, the district again became part of the Orenburg province until it became part of the Menzelinsky district Ufa province in 1865.

In 1920, the Menzelinsky district became part of the newly formed Tatar Autonomous Soviet Socialist Republic and was renamed the Menzelinsky canton, which, after its dissolution, was divided into the Menzelinsky and Aktash districts in 1930. Then the district included 53 selsoviet and 98 settlements, in which 54 813 people lived (of which 52 474 were Tatars, 1494 Russians and 845 from other nationalities). In 1940, the district's area was 1298 km^{2} and its population was recorded at 41.9 thousand souls living in 27 village councils and 77 settlements. From December 7, 1956, part of the abolished Yamashinsky district became part of the Aktanysh district, after the annexation of part of the abolished Kalininsky district. On October 12, 1959, the area of Aktanyshsky expanded to 2044.5 km^{2}, consisting of 25 village councils and 129 settlements. In 1963, as a result of the enlargement of the administrative units of the TASSR, the district was abolished with the transfer of territories to the Menzelinsky district but already on January 12, 1965, it was restored. The total district's territory was slightly reduced to 2019 km^{2} while its population at that time was recorded at roughly 52 600 thousand persons living in 25 village councils and 112 settlements.

=== Contemporary Aktanyshsky District ===
From 1998 to 2012, the district was headed by Engel Fattakhov. After Fattakhov, Fail Kamaev was appointed acting head of the district, subsequently becoming the district head in 2013 and holding this position until 2017. In September of the same year, Engel Fattakhov was re-elected to the post of head of the Aktanysh region. From the first term, Fattakhov managed to work simultaneously as the Minister of Education and Science of Tatarstan and Deputy Prime Minister of the republic. In 2018, the Anti-Corruption Foundation reported an expensive purchase of furniture for his office under the auspices of a state order, which resulted in a public outcry.

== Population ==
The district has the lowest proportion of Russians by share of population in the republic at 0.65% as well as an accordingly high proportion of Tatars. It is also the only region of the republic where the Mari people occupy the second place in terms of numbers.

== Municipal-territorial division ==
There are 86 settlements in the Aktanysh region comprising 26 rural settlements.

== Economy ==
=== Industry ===
Several small oil fields have been identified in the sediments of the coal deposits of the region, including Aktanysh, which was discovered in 1960. In 1995, Aznakaevskneft started developing oil production in the district. Since 2009, the Small Oil Company of Tatarstan has been engaged in production. One of the main organizations in the field of construction, production of building materials and oil field support for this industry is "Gazstroyservis".

Industry in the region is mainly oriented towards the agriculture sector which is the main economic engine of the region. Industrial companies in the district are mainly engaged in the processing of agricultural products and the repair of equipment. The following large enterprises operated in the district in 2020: Aktanysh Bakery, Agrosila branch - Aktanysh Grain Reception Enterprise, Aktanysh Aggregate Plant, Aktanysh-Khleb, and the Aktanysh Dairy Plant. From January to September 2020 alone the district produced and exported goods valued at 2.6 billion rubles. By comparison, for the entire 2013 this amount in value of goods produced was 1.4 billion».

The Aktanysh industrial park with a total area of 13 hectares has been operating on the territory of the district since 2017. Its occupancy rate for 2020 was 8%.

=== Agriculture ===
Agricultural land occupies 1251.44 km^{2} of the area of the district. There are 15 limited liability companies and 2 agricultural firms - "Anyak" and "Aktanysh", as well as 67 farms in the region. The main sectors of agricultural activity in the district are grain and livestock farming [46]. Spring wheat, winter rye, barley, oats, peas, potatoes and corn are cultivated in the region. In 2020 the Aktanysh district ranked fifth in Tatarstan in terms of daily milk production at 178 tons per day.

In the first half of 2020, the gross agricultural output of the district amounted to 1.2 billion rubles (for comparison in the whole of 2013 this figure was more than 2 billion rubles).

=== Investment potential ===
In the period from 2010 to 2019, the unemployment rate in the region was below the national average, ranging from 0.17% to 0.39% (with the exception of 2011, when the rate fell to 1.49%. In 2020, as a result of the COVID-19 pandemic, unemployment reached a high of the last 8 years of 0.51%, but this is the lowest rate in the entire republic. Between 2010 and 2020, the ratio of the average monthly wage to the minimum consumer budget increased by 0.82 points, from 1.56 to 2.38. At the same time, in 2010 the average salary was about 10 thousand rubles, and by 2012 it had increased to 14.5 thousand.

According to the Federal State Statistics Service of the republic, 1.83 billion rubles of investments were attracted to the Aktanysh region in 2019 (except for budget funds and income from small businesses), which amounted to 0.6% of the regional share of investment in the Republic. In 2018 investment was lower by almost 7 million and only amounted to 1.15 billion rubles. According to the assessment of the Committee for Social and Economic Monitoring of the Republic of Tatarstan, the volume of investment in the fixed assets of the region in the first half of 2020 amounted to more than 1.2 billion rubles, or 0.6% of total investment in Tatarstan, or 426 thousand per capita. This is in contrast to 2010 when this figure was almost 4 times less at 114 thousand per capita. According to the committee, the leaders by share of investment directed to them are the development of agriculture, fishing, hunting (collectively 235 million rubles), mining (209 million), electricity (32 million) and construction (10 million rubles).

=== Housing fund ===
Commissioning of residential buildings
	2018				2019				2020 (January–June)			
	sq.m	%	in Tatarstan		sq.m	%	in Tatarstan		sq.m	%	in Tatarstan	
	sq.m	%	m^{2}	% district	sq.m	%	sq.m	% district	sq.m	%	m^{2}	% district
In total	14177	100	2409949	0,59	14073		2675529	0,53	7309	100	1353428	0,54
Including enterprises	599	4,23	1301195	0,05	272	1,93	1569808	0,02	-	-	551485	-
Including population	13578	95,77	1108754	1,22	13801	98,07	1105721	1,25	7309	100	801943	0,91

=== Transport ===
The M-7 (Volga) "Moscow - Kazan - Ufa" motorway runs through the south of the district. Other important highways are: Aktanysh - Poisevo (to Menzelinsk, Naberezhnye Chelny), Aktanysh - Dyurtyuli (to Ufa), Aktanysh - Bakaly - Oktyabrsky, Churakaevo - Muslyumovo - Almetyevsk.

Water transport is well developed on the navigable Belaya River. There is a ferry on the Azyakul - Staroyanzigitovo route (roads to Agidel, Neftekamsk) as well as marinas near the Tatar Yamaly and Azyakul villages.

== Ecology ==
The natural monument Kulyagash is the largest lake-swamp massif in Tatarstan, located in the north-western part of the region. Its covers a total area of about 5000 hectares, with a length from west to east of 17.5 km, and from north to south of 10 km. The largest peat deposit in the republic is located here with total reserves of peat estimated at 5 million tons. The largest lakes within the massif are Lake Kulyagash, which gave its the name to the territory, Atyr, Kinder-Kul, Azybeevskoye and Syulale-Kul. In addition to these features, there are many elongated oxbow lakes and shallow bodies of water. For example, Kustovoe (Iske Idel) near the village of Aktanysh, Sezakkul near the village of Semiostrovo, Sutke-Kul, Usharova and Azyakul.

Regional water bodies have the status of a natural monument. A tributary of the Belaya River, the Syun river, flows along the eastern border of the region for 67.2 km. The left tributary of the Kama is the Ik river. Lake Kopanoe, almost rectangular in shape 100 by 50 meters, located on the left bank of the Xun River near the village of Chishma. Lake Kopanoe derives its name from its origins an artificially excavated body of water.

The Kamsko-Iksky Zakaznik preserve is partially located in the territory of the district. It was formed in 1963 to protect animals such as elk, roe deer, ermine, European mink, muskrat, and waterfowl.

== Culture and Society ==
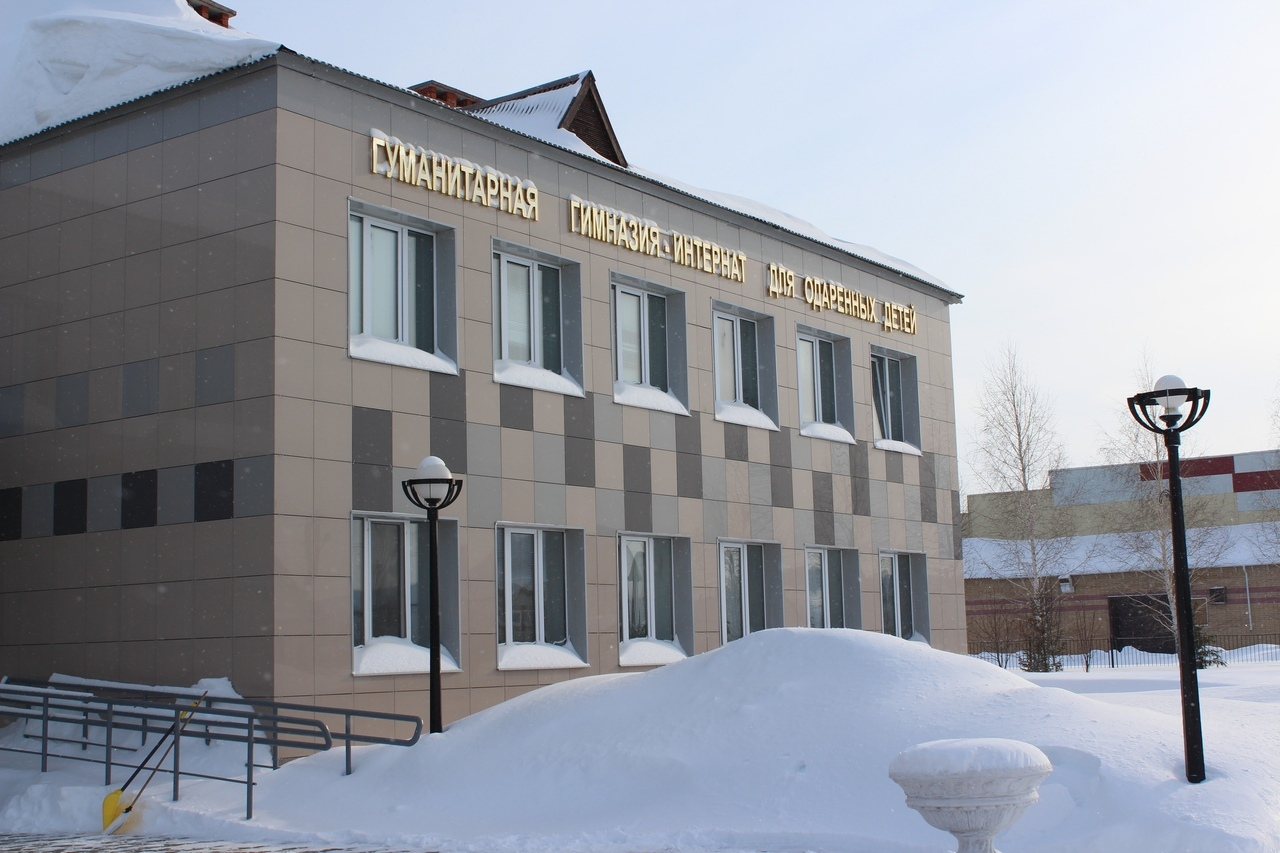
Humanitarian boarding school in Aktanysh

As of 2019, there were 13 secondary, 20 basic general and 31 primary schools, a cadet boarding school, a humanitarian boarding school for gifted children, a correctional boarding school, 39 kindergartens, the Aktanysh Technological College, a children's art school, and a center for children's creativity in the district. Sports and recreational infrastructure includes the ice palace "Lachin", a children's and youth sports school and physical training club, universal sports hall "Aktanysh" as well as the educational and health camp "Bulyak". The district's cultural infrastructure is represented by 113 different institutions: rural and regional houses of culture and clubs, the Yashlek cultural center, libraries, children's art schools with departments and the Aktanysh regional museum of local lore. Additionally, there are 13 folk art groups and the state ensemble of songs and dances "Agidel" active in the district.

=== Regional cultural heritage sites ===
- The necropolis near the village of Minnyarovo is a Bronze Age burial site on the left bank of the Xun River. Archaeologists have discovered items there typical of the nomadic tribes who grazed their herds in the fields from the Urals to the Danube.
- The Chishminsky burial ground is a monument of the Bronze Age. The mound was 23 m in diameter and 0.6 m high. The buried man was laid on a bast mat in a continental pit 1.55 m deep on his right side with his head to the east. His bones had a reddish tint, presumably from ocher bedding. They also found traces of a silver disc on the chest. A children's burial with a molded flat-bottomed pot was also cleared within the mound.
- The burial ground near the village of Urazaevo is a group of burials with the crumpled remains of people who were laid with their heads to the east. Nearby, Andronovo dishes were found within which an admixture of crushed shell was revealed in the test. According to the anthropological type, the population at the burial ground is presented as a mixed one, that is, it had both Mongolian and Caucasian features. Archaeologists believe that this group belongs to the Cherkaskul culture of burials and belongs to the period of the XIV century BC.
- House-Museum of Sharip Shaimiev is a small wooden mansion with six windows on the facade. It was built by the first chairman of the first collective farm named after May 1 of the Kalininsky district of the TASSR Sharip Shaimiev, the father of the first president of the Republic of Tatarstan Mintimer Shaimiev. The museum was opened on July 11, 2005, and since 2011 it has become a branch of the Aktanysh regional museum of local lore.
- House of Sh. Mukhitov in the village of Aktanysh, built in the 19th century for the merchants Mukhitov, it should also include the building of a warehouse, built in the late XIX - early XX centuries for storing skins, however, in 2017 it was demolished.

=== Famous people ===
- Alfiya Avzalova — a Soviet and Russian Tatar singer. She was an Honored Artist of the Tatar Autonomous Soviet Socialist Republic, People's Artist of the Tatar ASSR, Honored Artist of the RSFSR, soloist of the Tatar Philharmonic Society, and laureate of the State Prize of the Republic of Tatarstan.
- Gabdulkhay Akhatov – a Soviet Tatar Linguist, Turkologist and an organizer of science (earning his first Ph.D. in 1954) and then a second doctorate of Philology in 1965
- Mintimer Shaimiev – was the first to hold title of President of Tatarstan, a republic within Russia. He is an ethnic Tatar. He became president on June 12, 1991, and was re-elected three times, on March 24, 1996, on March 25, 2001, and on March 25, 2005
- Aliev, Takiulla Abdulkhannanovich (1894-1957) - Electrical engineer, leader of the Bashkir national movement
- Akhatov, Gabdulkhay Huramovich - scientist-Turkologist, linguist, dialectologist of the Tatar language
- Gumerov, Flun Fagimovich - entrepreneur
- Davletov, Bayan Erkeevich - Hero of the Soviet Union
- Imanov, Zufar Mintimirovich - Hero of Socialist Labour
- Mannanov, Ildar Mannanovich - Hero of the Soviet Union
- Mutin, Ildarkhan Ibragimovich - leader of the Bashkirs national movement
- Mutin, Mukhtar Iskhakovich - artist of the Tatar Academic Theater
- Mullagalieva Lilia Abugalievna - Honored Artist of the Republic of Tatarstan
- Rodionov, Anatoly Ivanovich - Soviet naval commander, rear admiral, candidate of naval sciences
- Sultanov, Mansur Islamovich (1875-1919) - flutist, folklorist. The first professional musician from the Bashkirs
- Sultanov, Iskandar Mukhamedyarovich (1872-1920) - leader of the Bashkir national movement, member of Kese Kurultay - Pre-parliament of Bashkortostan
- Fattakhov, Engel Navapovich - Deputy Prime Minister of the Republic, Regional Minister of Education and Science
- Rina Zaripova (1941-2008), Tatar journalist, Honored Worker of Culture of the Republic of Tatarstan.
