= Ik (river) =

River in Russia

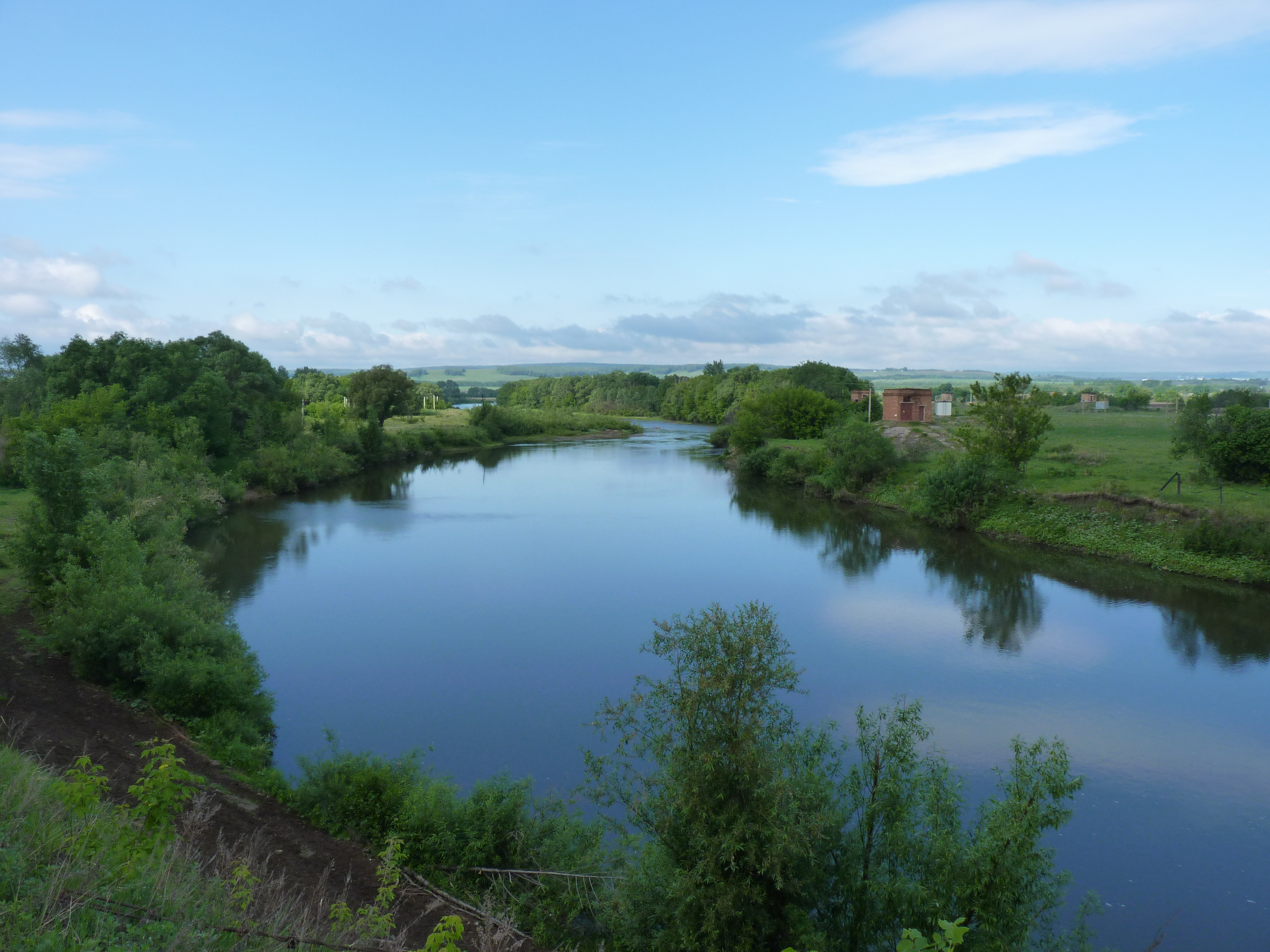

Location
- Country: Russia

Physical characteristics
- Source
  - location: Bugulma-Belebey Hills
- Mouth: Kama
  - location: Nizhnekamsk Reservoir
  - coordinates: 55°42′08″N 53°22′59″E
- Length: 571 km (355 mi)
- Basin size: 18,100 km^{2} (7,000 sq mi)
- Discharge
  - average: 45.5 m^{3}/s (1,610 cu ft/s) (near Nagaybakovo)

Basin features
- Progression: Kama→ Volga→ Caspian Sea

The Ik (Russian: Ик; Tatar: Ык, Iq; Bashkir: Ыҡ, Iq) is a river in Russia that flows north to the Kama, joining it from the left. It flows through the Republics of Bashkortostan and Tatarstan and through Orenburg Oblast. The left tributaries of the Ik are Mellya, Menzelya, Dymka, and the right tributary is Usen. It is 571 kilometres (355 mi) long, and its drainage basin covers 18,100 square kilometres (7,000 mi^{2}).

The time difference between Bavly in Tatarstan and Oktyabrsky in Bashkortostan is two hours (Tatarstan uses Moscow Time and Bashkortostan uses Yekaterinburg Time). Therefore, the bridge through Ik (river-border) is jokingly called "the longest bridge in the world".

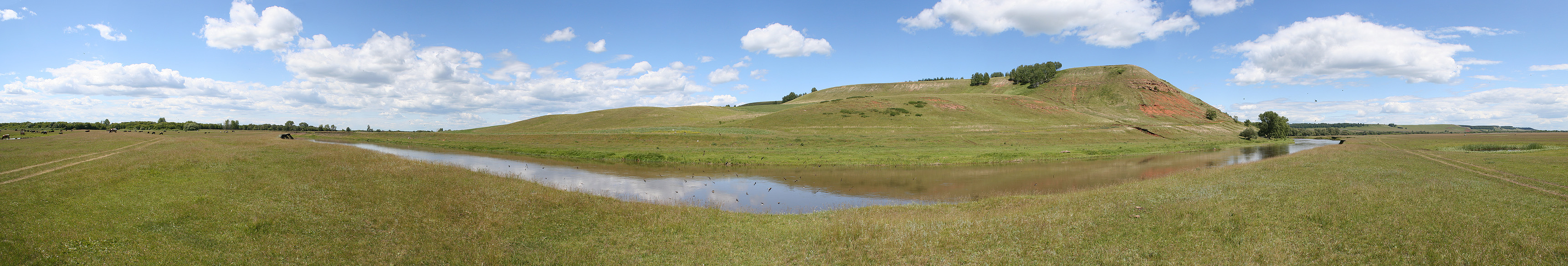
Ik river
