= Akhunovo =

Akhunovo Ахуново
- Village
- Location within Bashkortostan Location within Russia
- Coordinates: 54°48′N 54°38′E
- Country: Russia
- Region: Bashkortostan
- District: Blagovarsky District
- Time zone: UTC+5:00

Akhunovo (Russian: Ахуново; Bashkir: Ахун, Axun) is a rural locality (a village) in Troitsky Selsoviet, Blagovarsky District, Bashkortostan, Russia. The population was 214 as of 2010. There are 6 streets.

== Geography ==
Akhunovo is located 37 km northwest of Yazykovo (the district's administrative centre) by road. Kilimovo is the nearest rural locality.
