= Naratasty =

Naratasty Наратасты
- Selo
- Location within Bashkortostan Location within Russia
- Coordinates: 54°47′N 53°58′E
- Country: Russia
- Region: Bashkortostan
- District: Sharansky District
- Time zone: UTC+5:00

Naratasty (Russian: Наратасты; Bashkir: Наратаҫты, Narataśtı) is a rural locality (a selo) in Sharansky Selsoviet, Sharansky District, Bashkortostan, Russia. The population was 735 as of 2010. There are 21 streets.

== Geography ==
Naratasty is located 4 km southwest of Sharan (the district's administrative centre) by road. Sharan is the nearest rural locality.
