= Nagaybakovo =

Nagaybakovo Нагайбаково
- Selo
- Location within Bashkortostan Location within Russia
- Coordinates: 55°09′N 53°15′E
- Country: Russia
- Region: Bashkortostan
- District: Bakalinsky District
- Time zone: UTC+5:00

Nagaybakovo (Russian: Нагайбаково; Bashkir: Нуғайбәк, Nuğaybäk) is a rural locality (a selo) in Novoursayevsky Selsoviet, Bakalinsky District, Bashkortostan, Russia. The population was 317 as of 2010. There are 2 streets.

== Geography ==
Nagaybakovo is located 42 km west of Bakaly (the district's administrative centre) by road. Batrak is the nearest rural locality.
