= Rauis Gosmanov =

Rauis Gosmanovich Gosmanov
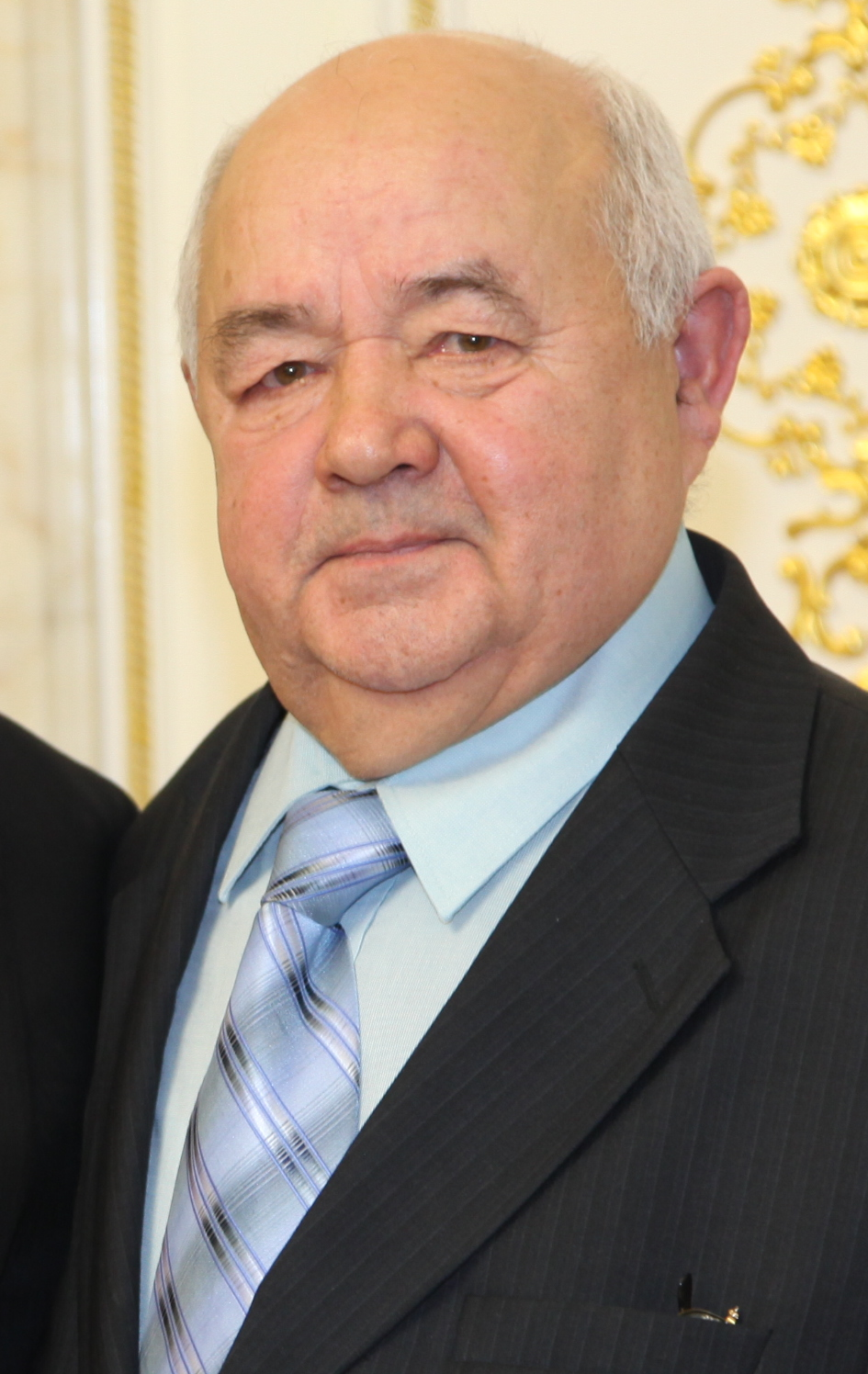
- Born: 1940 (age 85–86)
- Education: Kazan State Academy of Veterinary Medicine
- Awards: Honored Scientist of the Russian Federation (2003); Honorary Worker of Higher Professional Education of the Russian Federation (2000); Medal "Veteran of Labour"; Medal "In Commemoration of the 1000th Anniversary of Kazan"; Medals of VDNKh
- Scientific career
- Fields: Veterinary medicine
- Workplaces: Kazan State Academy of Veterinary Medicine

Rauis Gosmanovich Gosmanov (Russian: Рауис Госманович Госманов, born 1940) is a Soviet Russian scientist, Doctor of Veterinary Medicine (1986), Honored Scientist of the Russian Federation (2003) and Honored Scientist of the Republic of Tatarstan, Professor at the Kazan State Academy of Veterinary Medicine, Honorary Worker of Higher Professional Education of the Russian Federation (2000), Academician of the International Academy of Informatization (from 2001). Laureate of the State Prize of the Republic of Tatarstan in the field of science and technology for the year 2011.

He graduated from the Kazan State Academy of Veterinary Medicine in 1963. Since then, he works on his alma mater. From 1987 to 2007, Gosmanov headed the Department of Microbiology.

== Honors and awards ==
- Honored Scientist of the Russian Federation (2003)
- Honored Scientist of the Republic of Tatarstan (1998)
- Honorary Worker of Higher Professional Education of the Russian Federation (2000)
- Medal "In Commemoration of the 1000th Anniversary of Kazan"
- Medal "Veteran of Labour"
- Medals of VDNKh
- Professor of the Year Award, Kazan State Academy of Veterinary Medicine
- State Prize of the Republic of Tatarstan in the field of science and technology for the year 2011

R.G. Gosmanov is the recipient of the Academy of Sciences of the Republic of Tatarstan prize (2006) for his study on Propolis.
