= Akhunovo, Uchalinsky District, Republic of Bashkortostan =

Akhunovo Ахуново
- Selo
- Location within Bashkortostan Location within Russia
- Coordinates: 54°12′N 59°36′E
- Country: Russia
- Region: Bashkortostan
- District: Uchalinsky District
- Time zone: UTC+5:00

Akhunovo (Russian: Ахуново; Bashkir: Ахун, Axun) is a rural locality (a selo) and the administrative centre of Akhunovsky Selsoviet, Uchalinsky District, Bashkortostan, Russia. The population was 2,449 as of 2010.

== Geography ==
Akhunovo is located 25 km southeast of Uchaly (the district's administrative centre) by road. Kidysh is the nearest rural locality.
