= Aday, Kukmara District =

Aday Адай
- derevnya
- Location within Tatarstan
- Country: Russia
- Region: Tatarstan
- District: Kukmara District

Population (2010)
  - Total: 465
- Time zone: UTC+3:00

Aday (Tatar: Адай) is a rural locality (a derevnya) in Kukmara District, Tatarstan. The population was 465 as of 2010. Aday, Kukmara District is located 18 km from Kukmаra, district's administrative centre, and 149 km from Kazan, republic's capital, by road. The village was established in 17th century. There are 7 streets in the village.
