= Akhunovo, Salavatsky District, Republic of Bashkortostan =

Akhunovo Ахуново
- Village
- Location within Bashkortostan Location within Russia
- Coordinates: 55°19′N 58°03′E
- Country: Russia
- Region: Bashkortostan
- District: Salavatsky District
- Time zone: UTC+5:00

Akhunovo (Russian: Ахуново; Bashkir: Ахун, Axun) is a rural locality (a village) in Mechetlinsky Selsoviet, Salavatsky District, Bashkortostan, Russia. The population was 673 as of 2010. There are 5 streets.

== Geography ==
Akhunovo is located 19 km north of Maloyaz (the district's administrative centre) by road. Chulpan is the nearest rural locality.
