= Kuzeyevo =

Kuzeyevo Кузеево
- Village
- Location within Bashkortostan Location within Russia
- Coordinates: 56°02′N 55°49′E
- Country: Russia
- Region: Bashkortostan
- District: Baltachevsky District
- Time zone: UTC+5:00

Kuzeyevo (Russian: Кузеево; Bashkir: Күҙәй, Küźäy) is a rural locality (a village) in Shavyadinsky Selsoviet, Baltachevsky District, Bashkortostan, Russia. The population was 127 as of 2010. There are 3 streets.

== Geography ==
Kuzeyevo is located 7 km northwest of Starobaltachevo (the district's administrative centre) by road. Staroyaksheyevo is the nearest rural locality.
