= Nizhnekamsk Reservoir =

Lower Kama Reservoir, Nizhnekamsk Reservoir
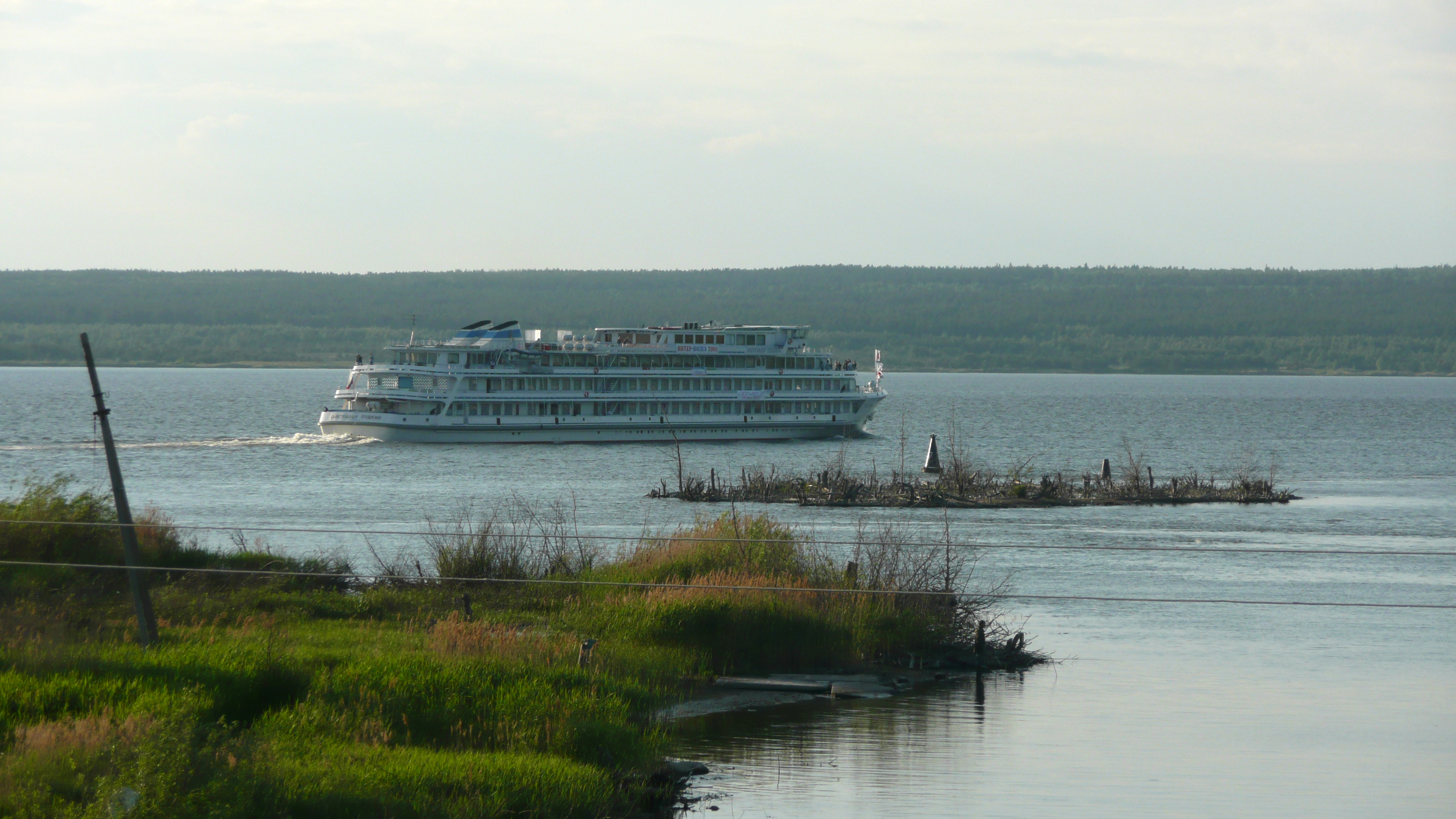
- Nishnekamsk reservoir near Naberezhnye Chelny.

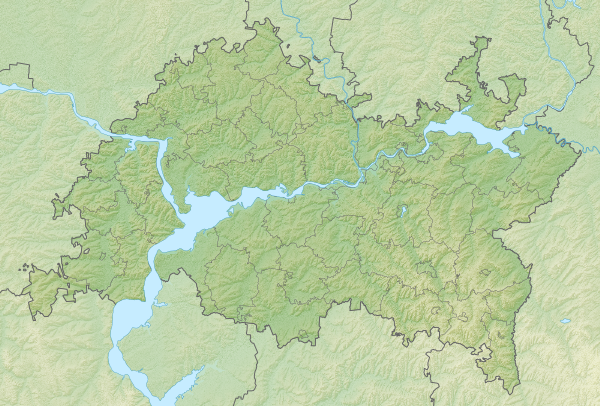
- Location within Tatarstan
- Coordinates: 55°54′20″N 52°44′30″E
- Type: Hydroelectric reservoir
- Primary inflows: Kama, Belaya, Ik, Izh, Syun, Menzelya Rivers
- Primary outflows: Kama
- Basin countries: Russia
- Max. length: 200 km (120 mi)
- Surface area: 1,084 km^{2} (419 sq mi)
- Water volume: 2.8 km^{3} (2.3×10^{6} acre⋅ft)
- Surface elevation: 63,3 (68 planned)
- Settlements: Naberezhnye Chelny; Mendeleyevsk; Menzelinsk; Sarapul; Neftekamsk; Kambarka; Agidel

Lower Kama Reservoir or Nizhnekamsk Reservoir (Russian: Нижнекaмское водохрани́лище; Tatar: Түбән Кама сусаклагычы) is the lowest reservoir from the Kama River hydroelectric cascade. It is situated in Tatarstan, Udmurtia, Bashkortostan and Perm Krai, Russian Federation. The reservoir was filled in 1978-81 up to 62 m above sea level after the construction of dam of the Lower Kama Hydroelectric Station. The water level in reservoir depends on the upper reservoirs regime (Kama Reservoir and Votkinsk Reservoir). The Lower Kama Reservoir has a surface area of 1,084 km² and a volume of 2.8 billion cubic meters. Its length along Kama is 185 km and 157 km along Belaya. The reservoir also used for water supply, irrigation and fishing.

The planned level of the reservoir is 68 m above sea level. Tatarstan government announced plans to reach the full planned power of the electric station. However, ecological movement inside of Tatarstan opposes these plans, as the reservoir would flood Kulyagash wetland and other lands in that case.
