= Menzelya =

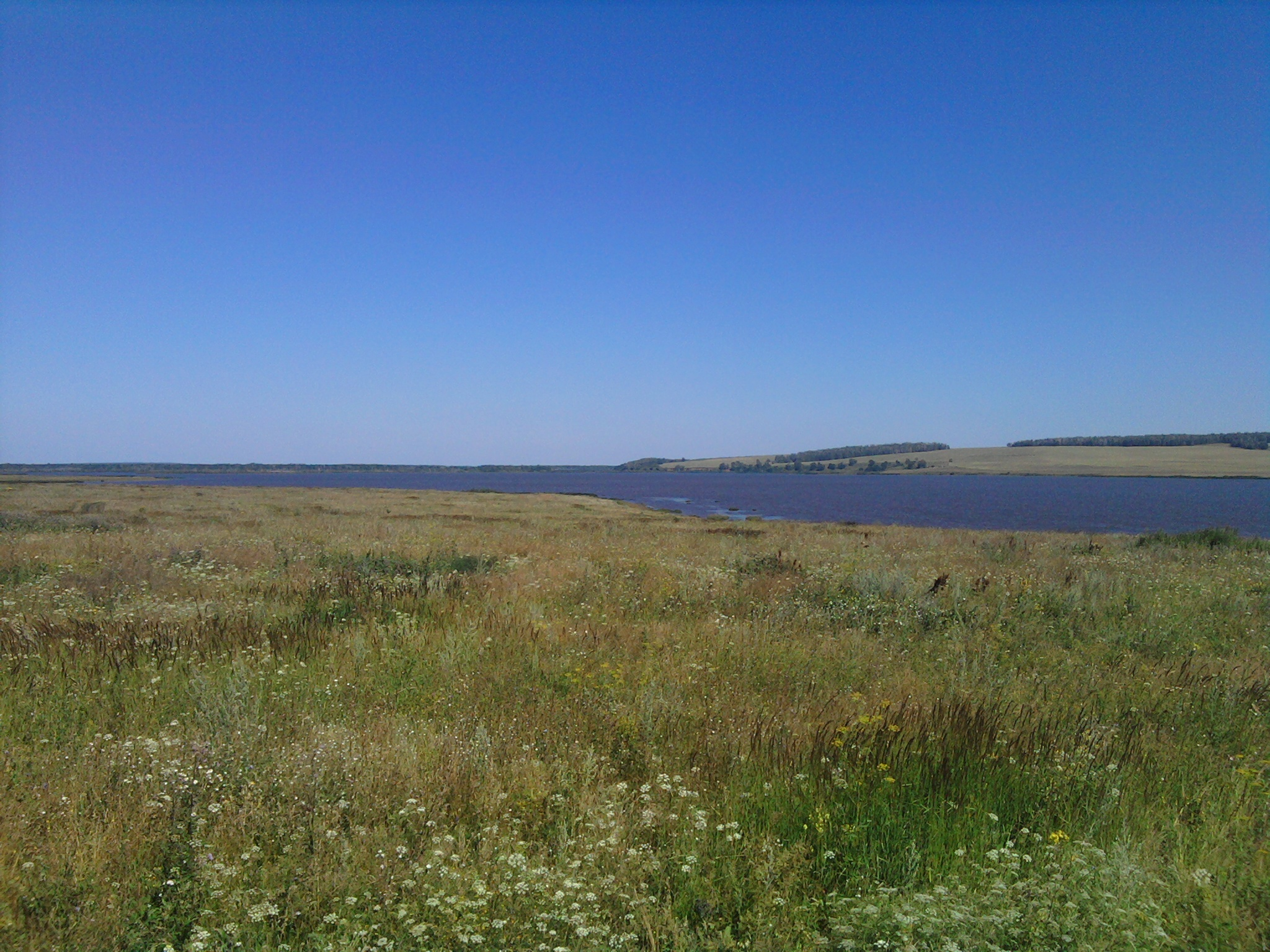

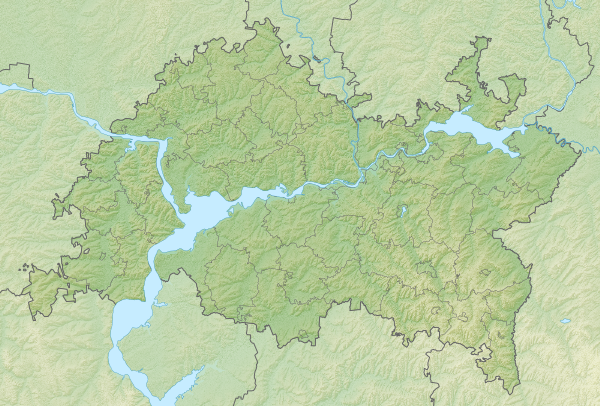
- The river mouth on the map of Tatarstan
- Native name: Минзәлә (Tatar)

Location
- Country: Russia
- Republic: Tatarstan

Physical characteristics
- Source
  - location: Novy Menzelyabash, Sarmanovsky District, Tatarstan
  - coordinates: 55°02′13″N 52°42′39″E
- Mouth
  - location: Nizhnekamsk Reservoir (formerly Ik (river))
  - coordinates: 55°41′55″N 53°05′24″E
- Length: 159 km (99 mi)
- Basin size: 2,120 km^{2} (820 mi^{2})
- Discharge
  - maximum: 215 m^{3}/s (7,600 cu ft/s) (1979)

Basin features
- Progression: Nizhnekamsk Reservoir→ Kama→ Volga→ Caspian Sea

The Menzelya (Russian: Мензеля; Tatar: Минзәлә) is a river in Tatarstan, Russian Federation, a former left-bank tributary of the river Ik, which flows into the Nizhnekamsk Reservoir. It is 159 kilometres (99 mi) long, and its drainage basin covers 2,120 square kilometres (820 mi^{2}).

The river's source is at the village Novy Menzelyabash, Sarmanovsky District, Tatarstan. Major tributaries are the Kholodnaya, Kamyshly, Iganya, Urguda rivers.

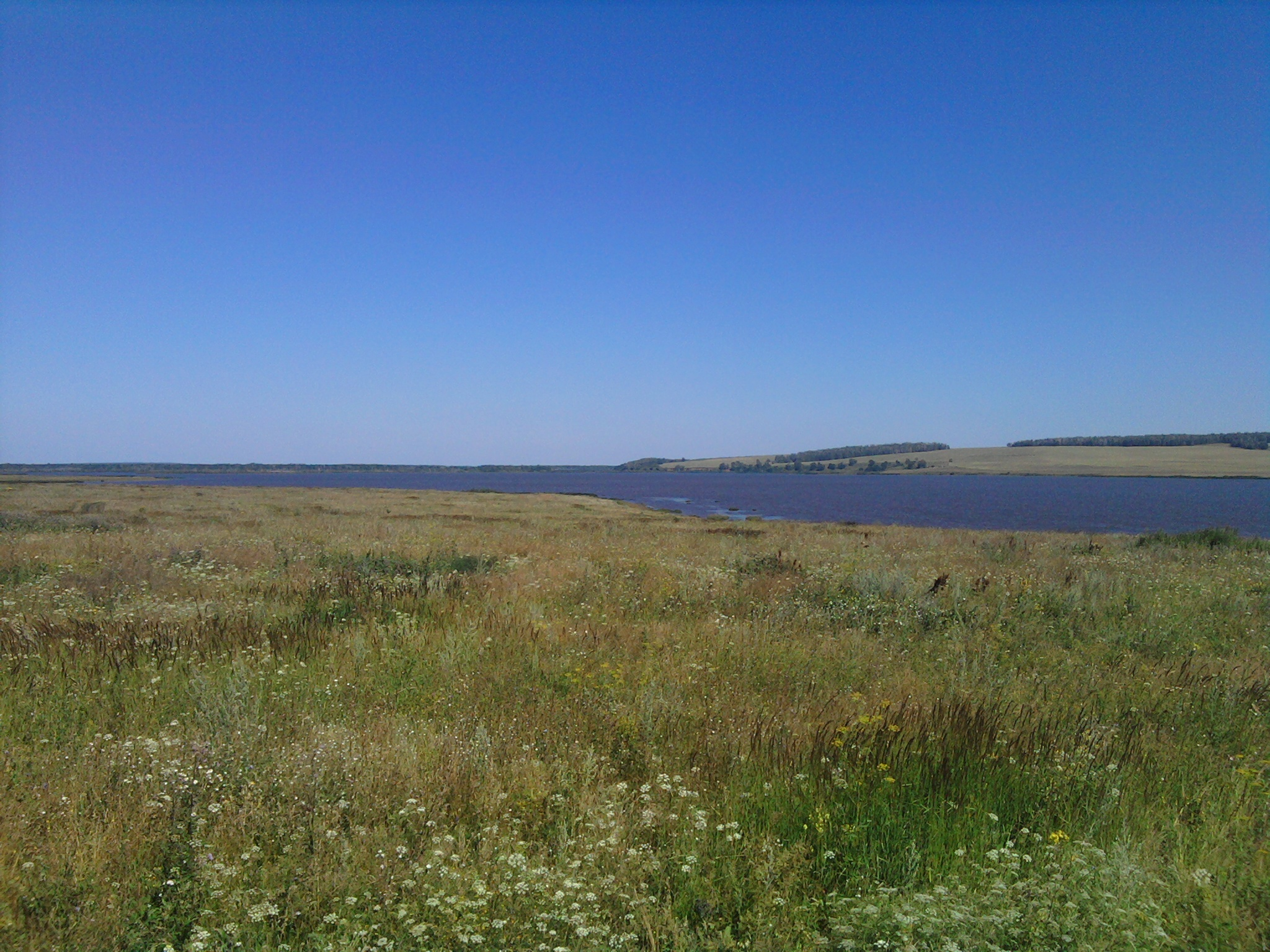
The area of former Menzelya River mouth, now a gulf of Nizhnekamsk Reservoir

The maximal mineralization is 400–800 mg/L. The average sediment deposition at the river mouth per year reaches 100 millimetres (3.9 in). The maximal discharge is 215 cubic metres per second (7,600 cu ft/s). Drainage is regulated. Since 1978, it has been protected as a natural monument of Tatarstan.

The town of Menzelinsk is located near the river's mouth. The notable landmark of the river and the town is an abandoned railway bridge, where the railway was never installed.
