= Menzelinsk =

Town in the Republic of Tatarstan, Russia

Menzelinsk Мензелинск
- Town

Other transcription(s)
  - Tatar: Минзәлә
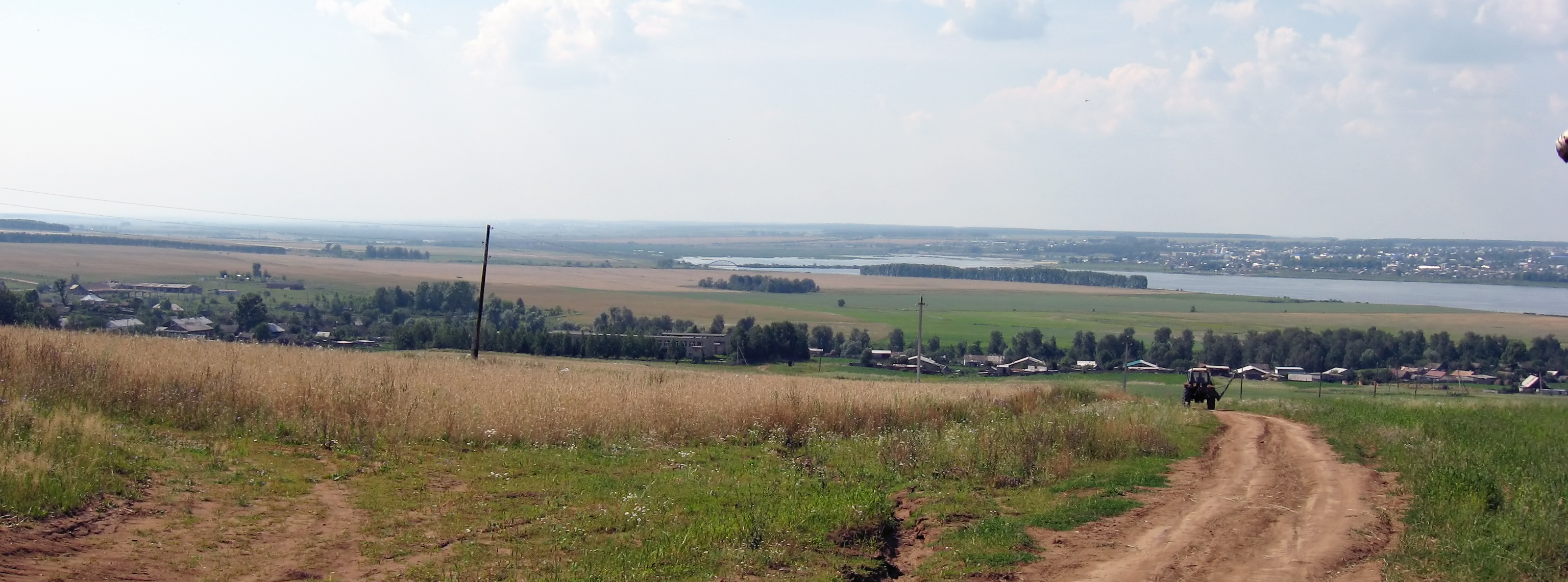

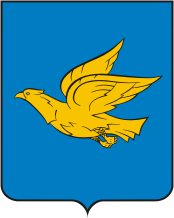
- Coat of arms
- Interactive map of Menzelinsk
- Location of Menzelinsk Menzelinsk (Tatarstan)
- Coordinates: 55°43′30″N 53°06′23″E
- Country: Russia
- Federal subject: Tatarstan
- Administrative district: Menzelinsky District
- Founded: 1584–1586
- Town status since: 1781

Area
  - Total: 7.4 km^{2} (2.9 sq mi)
- Elevation: 90 m (300 ft)

Population (2010 Census)
  - Total: 16,476
  - Estimate (2021): 16,008 (−2.8%)
  - Density: 2,200/km^{2} (5,800/sq mi)

Administrative status
  - Capital of: Menzelinsky District

Municipal status
  - Municipal district: Menzelinsky Municipal District
  - Urban settlement: Menzelinsk Urban Settlement
  - Capital of: Menzelinsky Municipal District, Menzelinsk Urban Settlement
- Time zone: UTC+3 (MSK)
- Postal codes: 423700–423703, 423709, 423716, 423718
- OKTMO ID: 92640101001
- Website: www.menzelinsk.ru

Menzelinsk (Russian: Мензели́нск; Tatar: Минзәлә) is a town and the administrative center of Menzelinsky District in the Republic of Tatarstan, Russia, located on the Menzelya River near its confluence with the Kama, 292 kilometers (181 mi) from the republic's capital of Kazan. Population: 16,476 (2010 census); 16,730 (2002 census); 15,223 (1989 Soviet census); 15,800 (1973).

== History ==
It was founded in 1584–1586 and was granted town status in 1781, when it was a part of Ufa Governorate. Menzelinsk Fair was a notable event in the 19th century and in the beginning of the 20th century. The town served as the administrative center of a kanton in 1920–1930 and as the district administrative center since then.

== Administrative and municipal status ==
Within the framework of administrative divisions, Menzelinsk serves as the administrative center of Menzelinsky District, to which it is directly subordinated. As a municipal division, the town of Menzelinsk is incorporated within Menzelinsky Municipal District as Menzelinsk Urban Settlement.

== Economy ==
As of 1997, industrial enterprises in the town included a bakery, a distillery, and a construction materials factory.

There is an airport in the town. The nearest railway station is Krugloye Pole on the Agryz–Akbash line, 65 kilometers (40 mi) to the northeast.

== Demographics ==
Menzelinsk population
- 2010 Census: 16,476
- 2002 Census: 16,730
- 1989 Census: 15,223
- 1979 Census: 16,683

As of 1989, Russians accounted for 49.3% of the town's population, while Tatars comprised 46.8% and Mari—1.6%.
