= Aktanysh =

Rural locality in Tatarstan, Russia

Aktanysh Актаныш
- Selo
- Interactive map of Aktanysh
- Location of Aktanysh Aktanysh (Tatarstan)
- Coordinates: 55°43′09″N 54°04′06″E
- Country: Russia
- Federal subject: Tatarstan
- Administrative district: Aktanyshsky District
- SettlementSelsoviet: Aktanysh Settlement
- Elevation: 67 m (220 ft)

Population (2010 Census)
  - Total: 8,923
  - Estimate (2021): 9,905 (+11%)

Administrative status
  - Capital of: Aktanyshsky District, Aktanysh Settlement

Municipal status
  - Municipal district: Aktanyshsky Municipal District
  - Rural settlement: Aktanyshsky Rural Settlement
  - Capital of: Aktanyshsky Municipal District, Aktanyshsky Rural Settlement
- Time zone: UTC+3 (MSK)
- Postal code: 423737
- OKTMO ID: 92605409101

Aktanysh (Russian: Актаны́ш; Tatar: Актаныш; Bashkir: Аҡтаныш), historically known as Lower Aktanyshbash (Russian: Нижний Актанышбаш; Bashkir: Түбәнге Аҡтанышбаш) is a rural locality (a selo) and the administrative center of Aktanyshsky District of the Republic of Tatarstan, Russia. The population is less than 10,000, though it has steadily increased in recent decades; 8,923 (2010 census); 8,148 (2002 census); 6,814 (1989 Soviet census).

The village is situated in the lower reaches of the Belaya (Ağiðel) river, in the easternmost part of Tatarstan, less than 6 km (3.7 mi) from the border with Bashkortostan. Aktanysh lies about 300 km (190 mi) east of Kazan and 165 km (103 mi) northwest of Ufa as the crow flies.

== History ==
Aktanysh was settled by Bashkirs of the Yabalakovskaya tyuba of the Kyrgyz volost (Note: The terms volost (Russian: волости, lit. 'yurt') and tyuba (Russian: тюба) describe units within the historical Bashkir sociopolitical structure as adapted by the Russian state. Tyuba are groups of related families (also: aimak, ara), a clan community. Volost refers to a tribe or tribal group comprising clans. The founders of Aktanysh can be loosely understood to be Bashkirs of the Yabalakovskaya clan of the Kyrgyz tribe (a Bashkir tribe not to be confused with the Kyrgyz people).) in the period prior to Bashkir integration into the Russian State. The earliest known record of the settlement dates from 1715.

Until 1920, the village was the center of Aktanyshsky Volost of the Menzelinsky Uyezd of Ufa Governorate. Aktanysh was included in the Tatar Autonomous Soviet Socialist Republic as part of the Menzelinsky canton. Since 1930 it has served as the center of the Aktanyshsky District, excepting the period during 1963 to 11 January 1965 when it was part of the Menzelinsky District. In the period from 1988 to 1991, Aktanysh had the status of an urban-type settlement.

== Education ==
The Boarding School of Humanities for Gifted Children (Tatar: Сәләтле балалар өчен гуманитар гимназия-интернат, Russian: Гуманитарная гимназия-интернат для одаренных детей) is a gymnasium located in Aktanysh. Unlike other secondary schools in the Republic of Tatarstan, it is managed by the state rather than the municipal district and is directly subordinate to the Ministry of Education and Science of Tatarstan. The Aktanysh Technical College (Tatar: Актаныш технология техникумы) is also located within the locality.
