= Sarmanovsky District =

Sarmanovsky District Сармановский район (Russian)
- District

Other transcription(s)
  - Tatar: Сарман районы
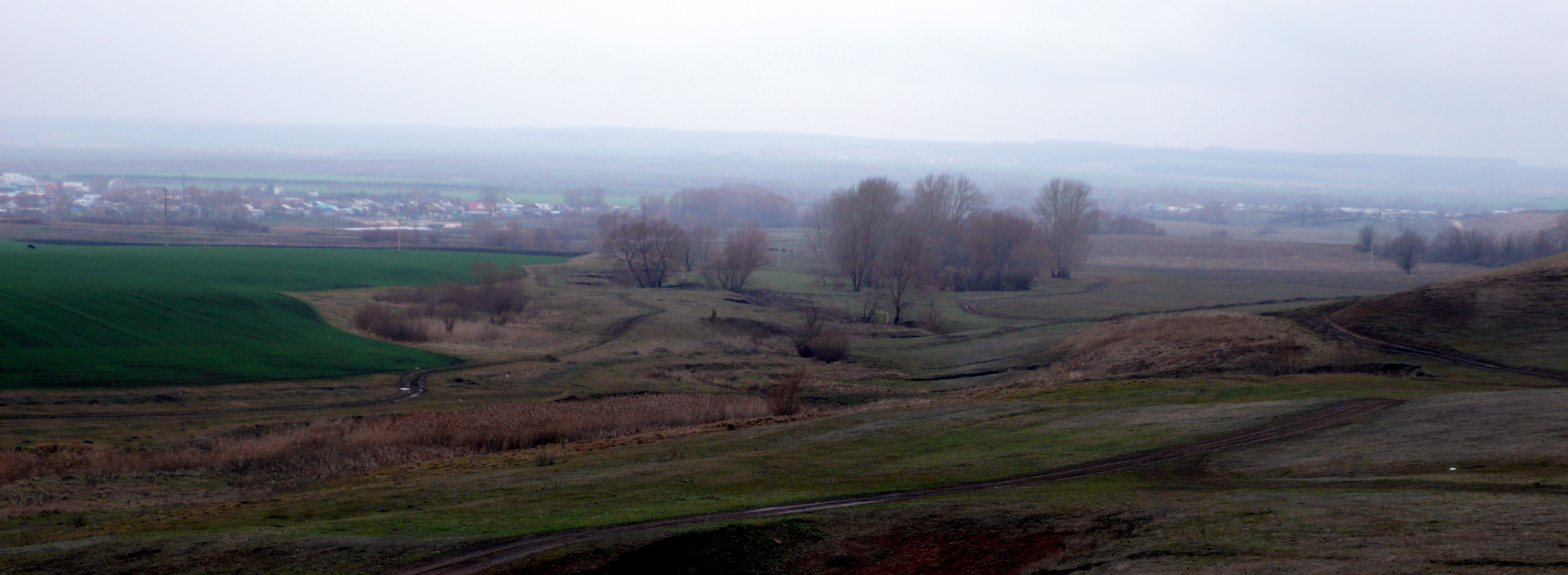
- Landscape in Sarmonovsky District

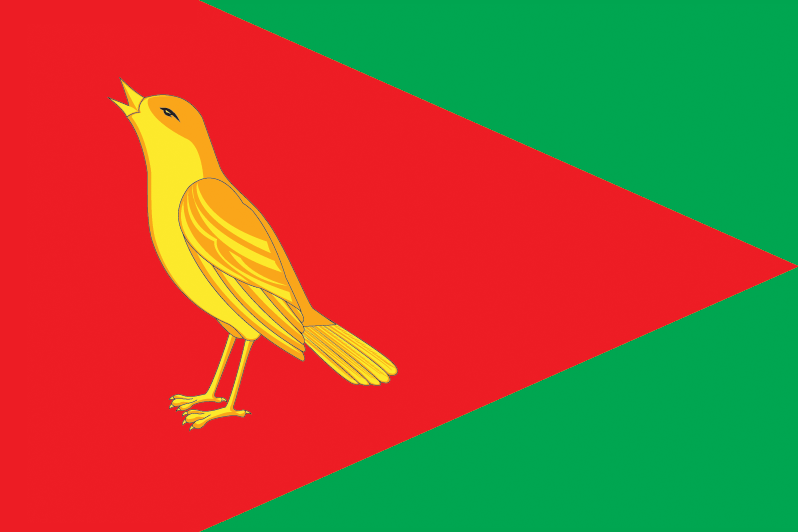
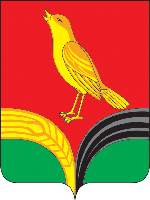
- Flag Coat of arms
- Location of Sarmanovsky District in the Republic of Tatarstan
- Coordinates: 55°16′N 52°40′E
- Country: Russia
- Federal subject: Republic of Tatarstan
- Established: 1930
- Administrative center: Sarmanovo

Area
  - Total: 1,385 km^{2} (535 sq mi)

Population (2010 Census)
  - Total: 36,681
  - Density: 26.48/km^{2} (68.59/sq mi)
  - Urban: 38.0%
  - Rural: 62.0%

Administrative structure
  - Inhabited localities: 1 urban-type settlements, 71 rural localities

Municipal structure
  - Municipally incorporated as: Sarmanovsky Municipal District
  - Municipal divisions: 1 urban settlements, 22 rural settlements
- Time zone: UTC+3 (MSK)
- OKTMO ID: 92653000
- Website: http://sarmanovo.tatarstan.ru/

Sarmanovsky District (Russian: Сарма́новский райо́н; Tatar: Сарман районы) is a territorial administrative unit and municipality of the Republic of Tatarstan within the Russian Federation. It is located in the east of the Republic of Tatarstan. The administrative center of the district is the village of Sarmanovo. At the beginning of 2020, 34,230 people lived in the district (12,695 are the urban population and 21,535 live in rural conditions).

The Sarmanovskiy district was established in 1930. In 1959, parts of the territories of the abolished Aktanyshsky and Yana-Yulsky districts were annexed to the Sarmanovsky district. Petroleum production is well developed in the Sarmanovsky district. The firm Jalilneft is engaged in the development of Romashkino field, Mellianeft in Muslyumovsky field, and TSNK in Nurkeevsky field.

== Geography ==
The Sarmanovsky district shares borders with the Tukayevsky, Menzelinsky, Muslyumovsky, Aznakaevsky, Almetyevsky, and Zainsky districts of Tatarstan. The district is located in the lower northeastern part of the Eastern Trans-Kama region, in the catchment area of the Menzel and Mellya rivers (The Ik river basin). There are protected natural areas: the Igana River, the Menzel River, Bukharaisky bor, and the Sulyukovsky forest on the territory of the district. The district is located in the forest-steppe zone. Forests cover no more than 10% of the territory of the district.

== Coat of arms and flag ==
The nightingale on the coat of arms symbolizes sublimity and creativity. The singing of the bird represents the successes of residents in the field of culture and art. Black stripes are a symbol of oil production. The red color symbolizes hard work, courage, optimism. Green represents nature, health, and fertility. Yellow (gold) means wealth, stability, respect, and intelligence. Black is a symbol of modesty, and wisdom. The flag is based on heraldic elements of the coat of arms.

== History ==
=== Background ===
After the discovery of a flat figurine of a mammoth of this period near the village of Nurkeyevo archaeologists suggested that the territory of the district was a place of settlement for ancient peoples of the Upper Paleolithic period. The first modern settlements appeared on the territory of the Sarmanovsky district at the end of the 16th century. Numerous villages were established in the first half of the 18th century. In February 1919 there were 16 villages in the Sarmanov volost and the peasants of the district mainly engaged in agriculture. There was only one commercial enterprise in the region, the Petrovsky distillery Stakheev and Sons.

Until 1920, the territory of the Sarmanovsky district was part of the Menzelinsky district of the Ufa province. In 1920, the Menzelinsky district became part of the newly formed Tatar ASSR as a canton of the same name. In 1922, the territory was transferred to the Chelninsky canton. In July 1930, all the cantons of the Tatar ASSR were abolished, and on August 10 the Sarmanovsky region was created. On March 26, 1959, it received a part of the territory of the abolished Aktanyshsky district. On October 12, 1959, a piece of land of the abolished Yana-Yulsky district was added to Sarmanovsky one.

== Current Sarmanovsky District ==
In 1999, Nafis Zakirov became the head of the Sarmanovsky district administration. In 2006, due to municipal reforms, municipal formations were implemented in Russia, and Zakirov was appointed head of the Sarmanovsky municipal formation (district). He left the position in 2014, moving to Tatneft. Since 2015 the position of the head of the district has been held by Farit Khusnullin, who was re-elected in 2020.

=== Population ===
There are three main nationalities in the Sarmanovsky district. The ethnic composition is the following: Tatars (90.4%), Russians (8.3%) and Bashkirs (0.4%). The gender composition is as follows: men – 46.4%, women – 53.6%. The birth rate in the district is 13.6%, and mortality is 12.8%. Working age persons make up 51.2% of the district's population, youth 24.8% and the elderly 24.0%. The average family includes 3.3 people, and the average rural settlement has 294 residents with 36.7% of the district's population living in urban conditions.

== Municipal and administrative status ==
There are one urban and 22 rural settlements with 72 settlements within them in the Sarmanovsky municipal district. The administrative centers of rural settlements are the villages: Dzhalil, Azalakovo, Aleksandrovka, Almetyevo, Bolshoye Nurkeyevo, Verkhniye Chershily, Ilyaksaz, Kavziyakovo, Karashay-Saklovo, Leshev Tamak, Lyaki, Murtysh-Tamak, Kutemeli, Petrovskiy Zavod, Rangazar, Saklov-Bash, Sarmanovo, Staryy Imyan, Staryy Kashir, Staryy Menzelyabash, Chukmarly, Sharliarema, and Yanurusovo.

== Economy ==
=== Industry ===
Oil production is well-developed in the Sarmanovsky district. There are several oil fields in the district. The firm Jalilneft is engaged in the development of Romashkinsky field, Mellianeft is engaged in the Muslyumovsky fields and TSNK works at Nurkeevsky field. Earlier, the company Druzhbaneft (the company belongs to the grandson of the first president of the republic, Timur Shaimiev) operated in this field. Its production was about 20 thousand tons per year, but in 2016 the company was liquidated.

From January to September 2020, regional companies of the district produced goods with a value of 1.5 billion rubles when compared with a total of 3.3 billion for the whole of 2013.

=== Agriculture ===
Despite oil production, the economy of the Sarmanovskiy district is predominantly agro-industrial. Spring wheat, winter rye, barley, peas, buckwheat, and sugar beets are cultivated in the district. The main livestock industries in the region are dairy and beef cattle breeding and pig breeding. The economic assessment of the land potential is 33.1. In 2020, the district took second place in the republic in the collection of sugar beets, producing 406.8 thousand tons of sugar beets from 8.8 thousand hectares. The yield was 460.0 c/ha, and the grain yield was 41.2 c/ha in 2020 ranking 6th among districts in the Republic of Tatarstan.

Among the large agricultural enterprises operating in the district are Jalil, Sarman and Nurkeevo (a division of the holding Agrosila). In 2016, the district ranked third in the republic in terms of its grain harvest (122 thousand out of 3.1 million tons).

In the first half of 2020, gross agricultural production in the district amounted to 442 million rubles. For 2013, this total came to nearly 1.9 billion.

=== Investment potential ===
The ratio of the average monthly wages to the minimum consumer budget in the district increased from 1.79 to 2.52 times from 2010 to 2020. The average salary was about 13.6 thousand rubles in 2010, and by 2020 it had increased to 35 thousand. The district unemployment rate decreased from 2.41% to 1.35% from 2010 to 2020 (the regional average is 3.78%).

According to the Committee of the Republic of Tatarstan for Social and Economic Monitoring, investment in fixed assets of the Sarmanovsky region (a full range of economic entities) amounted to almost 900 million rubles in January–June 2020. This figure corresponds to 0.4% of the total investment in Tatarstan. The majority of investments were made in mining (434 million rubles), the development of agriculture, hunting, and fishing (almost 57 million). According to the Federal State Statistics Service of the republic, almost 3.5 billion rubles of investment was attracted to the Sarmanovsky district in 2019 (excepting budgetary funds and income from small businesses). In 2018 this figure was 3.7 billion rubles.

=== Housing ===
Commissioning of residential buildings
	2018				2019				2020 (January–June)			
	m2	%	In Tatarstan		m2	%	In Tatarstan		m2	%	In Tatarstan	
	m2	%	m2	% of the district	m2	%	m2	% of the district	m2	%	m2	% of the district
Overall	10028	100	2409949	0,42	10077	100	2675529	0,38	5810	100	1353428	0,43
Including enterprises and organizations	-	-	1301195	-	1235	12,26	1569808	0,08	783	13,48	551485	0,14
Including the population	10028	100	1108754	0,90	8842	87,74	1105721	0,80	5027	86,52	801943	0,63

=== Transport ===
The Naberezhnye Chelny – Sarmanovo – Aznakaevo – Oktyabrsky road runs from north to south through the Sarmanovsky district, the Almetyevsk – Muslyumovo road runs from the southwest to the east, the Sarmanovo – Zainsk road leads to the west and the Aznakayevo – Jalil – Russkiy Aktash road is located in the extreme south of the district.

In 2010, a major overhaul of the Sarmanovo-Igania-Bash road to the village of Murtysh Bash was carried out at a cost of 39.1 million rubles.

== Social welfare and public life ==
There are 32 schools and 33 kindergartens serving the Sarmanovsky district. The vocational school in the district has departments preparing graduates for six professions. Medical services are provided by 51 feldsher-obstetric points, the Central and Jalil regional hospitals, the Saklobash district hospital, and the Aleksandrovskaya medical clinic in the district. Sports infrastructure is represented by 124 facilities of various types.

Cultural attractions in the district include 36 rural houses of culture, 14 rural clubs, two regional houses of culture, two museums, a central public and children's library and its 36 rural branches in Sarmanovsky district. 10 active folk groups are involved in preserving and presenting the cultural life of the district.

Since 1931, the regional newspaper Sarman has been published. Initially, it was called Combine. Previously this newspaper held the names Kyr stakhanovchysy, Yugary ugysh uchen, and Leninichy. In 2017, the newspaper was nominated as "the best republican, city, regional mass media" at the XX competition in the field of journalism and mass media of the Republic of Tatarstan Bellur Kalem – Crystal Pen.

The archeological remnants of several timber-frame dwelling late Bronze Age communities have been found on the territory of the district: Karashai-Saklovskaya site, Sarmanovskaya site, Yakhshi-Karanskiy kurgan, and Rantamak settlement. Cultural heritage sites in the district include mosques in the village of Stary Menzelyabash (early 20th century), the village of Yakhshebaevo (early 20th century), the village of Murtysh Bash (late 19th – early 20th centuries), the village of Yakhshi-Karan (1922), as well as a church in the village Yazykovo (1891).

== Bibliography ==
- Nacional'nyj arhiv Respubliki Tatarstan: Putevoditel'. 2 izdanie [National Archives of the Republic of Tatarstan: Guide. 2nd edition]. Kazan: Gasyr. 1999. Archived from the original on May 17, 2014.
- "Vedomosti Verhovnogo Soveta SSSR [Vedomosti of the Supreme Soviet of the USSR]". Vedomosti Verhovnogo Soveta SSSR. 13 (945). 1959.
- "Vedomosti Verhovnogo Soveta SSSR [Vedomosti of the Supreme Soviet of the USSR]". Vedomosti Verhovnogo Soveta SSSR. 42 (947). 1959.

== Bibliography ==
- Ermakov, R.R. (1989). Chelninskaja istorija [Chelninsk history]. Kazan: Gasyr. Archived from the original on September 10, 2010.
- Zigashin, I.I.; Ivanov, D.V.; Tomaeva, I.F. (2015). Ekologicheskii gid po zelenym ugolkam Respubliki Tatarstan [Ecological guide to the nature of the Republic of Tatarstan] (PDF). Kazan: Foliant. Archived from the original (PDF) on January 8, 2021.
