= Rafis Kashapov =

Tatar politician and dissident (born 1958)

Leader in Free Nations of Post-Russia Forum
- Incumbent
- Assumed office March 21, 2018

Personal details
- Born: Кашапов Рафис Рафайл улы July 2, 1958 (age 68) Tumutuk, Aznakayevsky District, Tatar ASSR, USSR

Rafis Rafailovych Kashapov (Tatar: Кашапов Рәфис Рафаил улы, Russian: Рафис Рафаилович Кашапов) is a Tatar politician and dissident serving as the vice-prime minister of the self-declared Tatar government-in-exile. Kashapov is a leader and speaker at the Free Nations of Post-Russia Forum.

== Biography ==
Kashapov was born on July 2, 1958, in Tımıtıq, Aznakayevsky District, Tatar ASSR of the USSR. His brother is Nafis Kashapov, also a Tatar political activist who received asylum in Poland. Rafis Kashapov was first convicted in 1981, serving two years in prison for theft of state property. In 1987, he served a year in prison for threatening a public official, and two years in prison in 1988 for "underreporting of crimes."

Following the collapse of the USSR, Kashapov became a successful philanthropist and businessman in Tatarstan. He helped build mosques in the region, madrasas, and supported the proliferation of Tatar culture. The FSB began investigating Kashapov and his brother in 2000, repeatedly detaining the two and threatening them with violence. Kashapov was supported by other Russian human rights organizations and journalists such as Memorial and Anna Politkovskaya.

=== Russo-Ukrainian war ===
When Russia invaded Crimea and backed separatists in Donetsk and Luhansk oblasts, sparking the Russo-Ukrainian War, Kashapov and his brother public condemned the actions and began anti-war rallies in Tatarstan. Kashapov announced a hunger strike in support of Nadiya Savchenko and called on Tatars not to fight Ukrainians. He was arrested on December 28, 2014, shortly after returning from Turkey where he organized more protests against the Russian annexation of Crimea and Vladimir Putin. Kashapov also made pan-Turkic statements, calling for unity between Turkic groups in the Caucasus, Russia, and Crimean Tatars.

The reason Kashapov was arrested for posts on his Vkontakte comparing Putin's regime to Hitler. Russian authorities prosecuted Kashapov under Article 282.1 of the Russian criminal code, which criminalized Kashapov for making extremist statements. Spontaneous protests erupted across the Volga region, where Tatarstan is located, in support of Kashapov. Denys Safargaliev, a Tatar who organized protests in Kazan, was fired from his job, and another activist was detained in Izhevsk.

Kashapov began a second hunger strike on January 18, 2015, in support of political prisoners in Russia and Russian interference in the War in Donbas. In response, Kashapov's lawyers were intimidated by Russian authorities, and Kashapov's wife was blackmailed by Russian police trying to get her to testify against him. Kashapov appealed to the President of Turkey for asylum. Kashapov was sentenced to three years in prison on September 15, 2015, for "calling for separatism and inciting hatred on ethnic grounds."

=== Reactions to Kashapov's imprisonment ===
Prominent members of Tatar intelligentsia, including a former State Duma member and famous artists and scientists. Amnesty International demanded Kashapov's release on September 16, and Memorial labeled Kashapov a political prisoner. Protests in support of Kashapov also took place in Ukraine in July and September 2015. The second protest in September took place in front of the Russian embassy in Kyiv and was attended primarily by Tatar and Erzyan political refugees.

On December 21, 2015, fifteen deputies of the Verkhovna Rada of Ukraine appealed to Ukrainian Minister of Foreign Affairs Pavlo Klimkin demanding the release of Kashapov from Russian prison. Ihor Lutsenko, the deputy who spearheaded the appeal, spoke out in favor of Kashapov's release and lambasted Russian persecution of Tatar organizations. In 2017, while Kashapov was still in prison, Russian authorities recognized the All-Tatar Public Center as a terrorist organization.

=== Release and emigration ===
Kashapov was released from prison on December 26, 2017. In February 2018, fearing a new arrest, he fled to Ukraine. While in Kyiv, Kashapov gave a number of interviews stating he would not return to Russia and that he would continue to create oppositionist and pro-Tatar organizations in exile. On March 21, 2018, along with Erzyan separatist Syreś Boläeń and Ukrainian journalist Rostyslav Martyniuk, Kashapov announced the creation of Free Idel-Ural, a separatist movement in exile calling for the independence of Tatarstan, Mordovia, Chuvashia, Bashkortostan, Mari El, and Udmurtia. At the summit, Kashapov called for independence of Tatarstan and a return to the Constitution of the Republic of Tatarstan in 1992.

Kashapov immigrated to the UK in 2018, and continued to campaign for Tatar separatism and Free Idel-Ural while in London. In January 2022, Kashapov released a statement in support of anti-government protesters during the 2022 Kazakh unrest. His statement was signed by other Tatar, Erzyan, Bashkir, Chechen, Ingush, Kalmyk, and Don Cossack political supporters.

Following the Russian invasion of Ukraine in February 2022, Kashapov helped found the Free Nations of Post-Russia Forum and supported Ukraine in the war against Russia. Kashapov called for the collapse of the Russian federation in November 2023. Russian authorities launched a second probe into Kashapov in June 2024.
