= Aktyubinsky =

Aktyubinsky (Russian: Актюбинский; masculine), Aktyubinskaya (Актюбинская; feminine), or Aktyubinskoye (Актюбинское; neuter) is the name of several inhabited localities in Russia.

== Modern localities ==
Urban localities

- Aktyubinsky, Republic of Tatarstan, an urban-type settlement in Aznakayevsky District of the Republic of Tatarstan

Rural localities

- Aktyubinsky, Orenburg Oblast, a settlement in Aktyubinsky Selsoviet of Svetlinsky District in Orenburg Oblast

== Alternative names ==
- Aktyubinskaya, alternative name of Aktyuba, a village in Aryksky Rural Okrug of Malmyzhsky District in Kirov Oblast; 56°35′N 50°45′E
