= Tımıtıq =

Tımıtıq Тымытык
- selo
- Location within Tatarstan
- Country: Russia
- Region: Tatarstan
- District: Aznaqay District
- Elevation: 96 m (315 ft)

Population (2021)
  - Total: 1,094
- Time zone: UTC+3:00

Tımıtıq (Tatar: Тымытык, romanized: Tımıtıq) is a rural locality (a selo) in Aznaqay District, Tatarstan. The population was 1472 as of 2010. Tımıtıq is located 23 km from Aznaqay, district's administrative centre, and 328 km from Ԛazan, republic's capital, by road. The village was established in 18th century. There are 26 streets in the village.
