= Alsu Abdullina =

Russian footballer (born 2001)

Personal information
- Full name: Alsu Renatovna Abdullina
- Date of birth: 11 April 2001 (age 25)
- Place of birth: Aktyubinsky, Russia
- Height: 1.66 m (5 ft 5 in)
- Positions: Left-back; wing-back

Team information
- Current team: Lokomotiv Moscow

Senior career*
Years	Team	Apps	(Gls)
2017–2019	Chertanovo Moscow	43	(5)
2020–2021	Lokomotiv Moscow	36	(6)
2021–2024	Chelsea	11	(0)
2023–2024	→ Paris FC (loan)	10	(0)
2024–	Lokomotiv Moscow	15	(4)

International career^{‡}
2017–2018	Russia U17	12	(2)
2018–2019	Russia U19	8	(3)
2017–	Russia	45	(4)
- * Club domestic league appearances and goals as of 20 May 2024 ‡ National team caps and goals as of 28 January 2024

Alsu Renatovna Abdullina (Russian: Алсу Ренатовна Абдуллина; Tatar: Абдуллина Алсу Ренат Кызы, romanized: Abdullina Alsu Renat Kyzy; born 11 April 2001) is a Russian footballer who plays as a left-back or wing-back for Lokomotiv Moscow in the Russian Women's Football Championship and the Russia women's national team.

== Club career ==
=== Chelsea ===
In December 2021, Abdullina joined English club Chelsea, signing a two-and-a-half-year deal until June 2024. After making 20 appearances in all competitions over the next 18 months, Abdullina moved to Paris FC on loan for the 2023–24 season.

== Honours ==
Chelsea

- FA Women's Super League: 2022–23
- Women's FA Cup: 2022–23

== International career ==
Abdullina has been capped for the Russia national team, appearing for the team during the 2019 FIFA Women's World Cup qualifying cycle.

=== International goals ===
No.	Date	Venue	Opponent	Score	Result	Competition
1.	27 November 2020	Arslan Zeki Demirci Sports Complex, Manavgat, Turkey	Kosovo	2–0	3–0	UEFA Women's Euro 2022 qualifying
2.	26 October 2021	FF BH Football Training Centre, Zenica, Bosnia and Herzegovina	Bosnia and Herzegovina	3–0	4–0	2023 FIFA Women's World Cup qualifying
3.	25 November 2021	Dalga Arena, Azerbaijan, Baku	Azerbaijan	2–0	4–0	2023 FIFA Women's World Cup qualifying
4.	14 July 2023	Central Stadium, Kazan, Russia	Iran	1–0	4–0	Friendly
