= Dzhalil (urban-type settlement) =

Dzhalil Джалиль
- Urban-type settlement

Other transcription(s)
  - Tatar: Җәлил
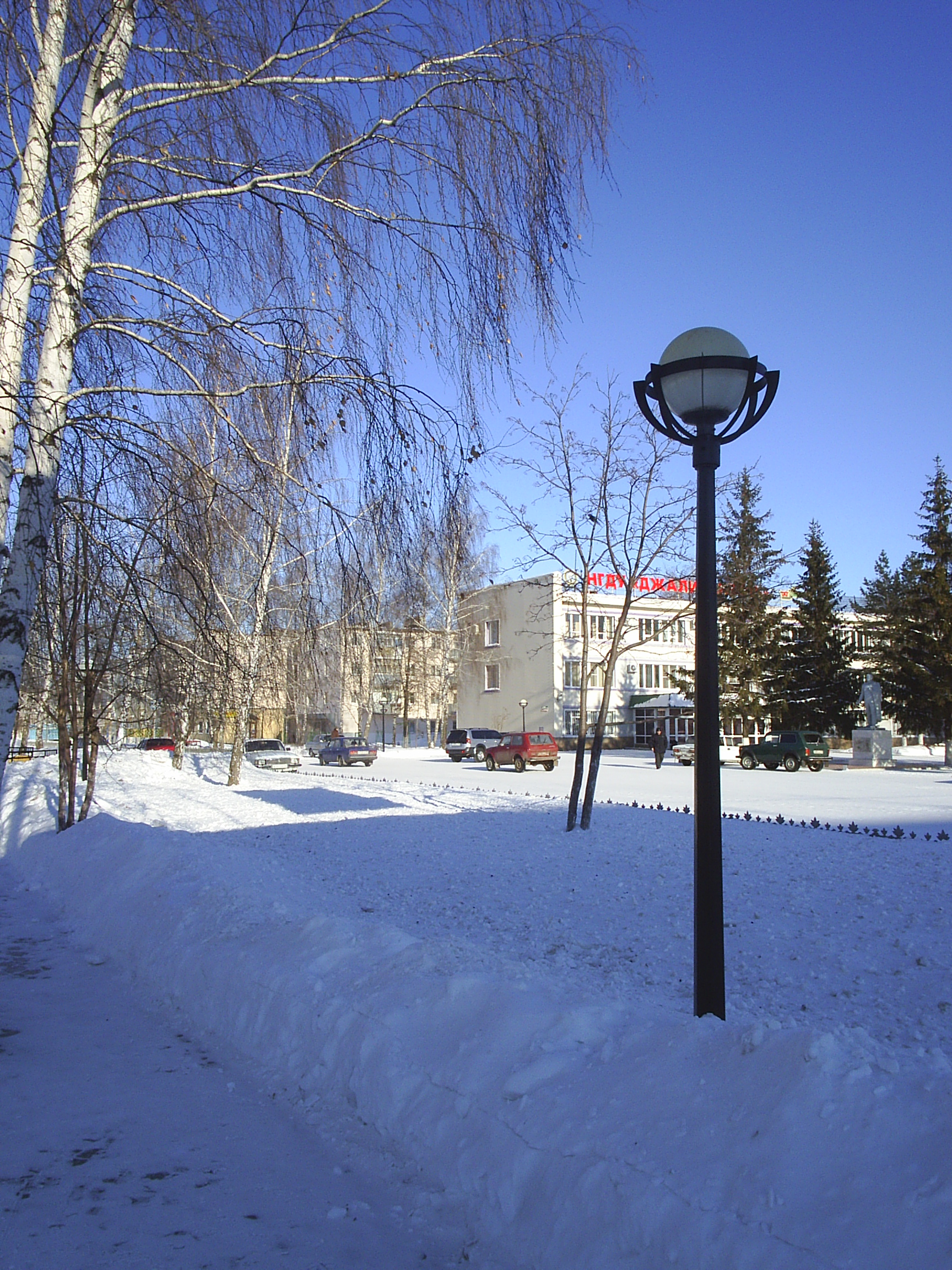
- In Dzhalil
- Interactive map of Dzhalil
- Location of Dzhalil Dzhalil (Tatarstan)
- Coordinates: 55°02′N 52°45′E
- Country: Russia
- Federal subject: Tatarstan
- Administrative district: Sarmanovsky District
- Founded: 1964
- Urban-type settlement status since: 1968
- Elevation: 303 m (994 ft)

Population (2010 Census)
  - Total: 13,937
  - Estimate (2021): 13,560 (−2.7%)

Municipal status
  - Municipal district: Sarmanovsky Municipal District
  - Urban settlement: Dzhalil Urban Settlement
  - Capital of: Dzhalil Urban Settlement
- Time zone: UTC+3 (MSK)
- Postal code: 423368
- OKTMO ID: 92653155051

Dzhalil (Russian: Джали́ль; Tatar: Җәлил) is an urban locality (an urban-type settlement) in Sarmanovsky District of the Republic of Tatarstan, Russia, located near the source of the Menzelya River, 35 kilometers (22 mi) south of Sarmanovo, the administrative center of the district. As of the 2010 Census, its population was 13,937.

== History ==
It was founded in 1964 and was granted urban-type settlement status in 1968. It is named after Tatar poet Musa Cälil.

== Administrative and municipal status ==
Within the framework of administrative divisions, the urban-type settlement of Dzhalil is subordinated to Sarmanovsky District. As a municipal division, Dzhalil, together with three rural localities, is incorporated within Sarmanovsky Municipal District as Dzhalil Urban Settlement.

== Economy and infrastructure ==
As of 1997, two major industrial enterprises in the settlement were Dzhalilneft oil company and a bakery.

== Demographics ==
Dzhalil population
- 2010 Census: 13,937
- 2002 Census: 14,769
- 1989 Census: 11,298
- 1979 Census: 7,671

In 1989, ethnic Tatars accounted for 77.7% of the population, followed by the Russians at 19.6%.
