= Mikulino =

Mikulino (Russian: Микулино) is the name of several rural localities in Russia:

- Mikulino, Moscow Oblast, a selo in Mikulinskoye Rural Settlement of Lotoshinsky District in Moscow Oblast; 56°27′N 35°36′E
- Mikulino, Loknyansky District, Pskov Oblast, a village in Loknyansky District of Pskov Oblast
- Mikulino, Sebezhsky District, Pskov Oblast, a village in Sebezhsky District of Pskov Oblast
- Mikulino, Ryazan Oblast, a village in Mikulinsky Rural Okrug of Miloslavsky District in Ryazan Oblast
- Mikulino, Smolensk Oblast, a village in Perevolochskoye Rural Settlement of Rudnyansky District in Smolensk Oblast
- Mikulino, Republic of Tatarstan, a selo in Aznakayevsky District of the Republic of Tatarstan
