= Free Idel-Ural =

London-based Russian Turkic–Uralic secessionist organisation

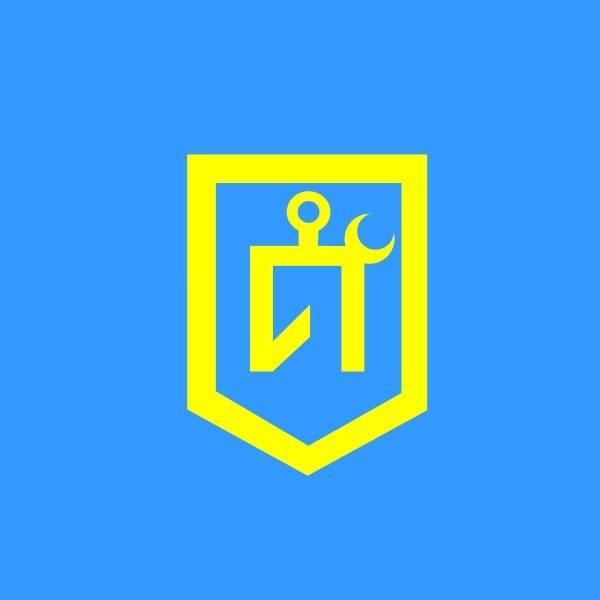
- Idel-Ural tamga
- Leaders: Rafis Kashapov; Syreś Boläeń
- Dates active: since 21 March 2018
- Headquarters: London
- Active regions: Bashkortostan; Chuvashia; Mari El; Mordovia; Tatarstan; Udmurtia
- Ideology: Nationalism
- Website: idel-ural.org/en/

Free Idel-Ural (Russian: Свободный Идель-Урал; Tatar: Азат Идел-Урал; Erzya: Олячив Рав-Уралонь) is a marginal civil movement of the people of the Russian region of Idel-Ural that aims for independence for the republics of Mordovia, Chuvashia, Mari El, Tatarstan, Udmurtia and Bashkortostan and the integration of these six republics into a political union with a common external border, economic space and collective safety system.

== History ==
Rafis Kashapov, one of the leaders of the Tatar national movement, was convicted for his criticism of the Russian annexation of Crimea in September 2015 and sentenced to three years in a penal colony. He was released on December 26, 2017. At the beginning of February 2018, Kashapov emigrated to Ukraine where he encountered a like-minded person named Syreś Boläeń, a Mordovian-born military pensioner of Erzyan ethnic origin.

On March 21, 2018, Rafis Kashapov and Syreś Boläeń conducted a press conference with a small group of their adherents in Kyiv where the foundation of the Free Idel-Ural civic movement was publicly declared.

During the first five months of its activity, the organization avoided speaking from openly secessionist positions, while declaring its struggle for renewal of the sovereignty of the Povolzhye republics. However, when the Russian State Duma approved a law on the study of mother tongues in public educational establishments, which removed the official languages of the Idel-Ural republics from compulsory school curriculums, Free Idel-Ural changed the main aim of the movement's activity.

The declaration of Free Idel-Ural stated their intent to create independent national democratic states in Erzyano-Mokshania (Mordovia), Chuvashia, Mari El, Tatarstan, Udmurtia, and Bashkortostan, while noting its policy of non-violent methods of resistance. A few days after this declaration, the Russian media reported that a new criminal proceeding had been initiated against Kashapov for the publication of materials on the Internet that incite hatred on the grounds of race, ethnic origin, language and religion.

In July 2022, Russia designated Free Idel-Ural an "undesirable organisation".

== Ideology ==
Free Idel-Ural positions itself as a mass civic-political movement, based on principles of democracy and humanism. The main aim of the movement is the construction of the independent national democratic states of Erzyano-Mokshania, Chuvashia, Mari El, Tatarstan, Udmurtia and Bashkortostan. The primary objectives of the organization are the realization of social, cultural and religious rights for Erzyas, Mokshas, Chuvashs, Mari, Tatars, Udmurts and Bashkirs.

=== Status of the republics of Idel-Ural ===
Free Idel-Ural aims for the construction of the independent national democratic states of Erzyano-Mokshania, Chuvashia, Mari El, Tatarstan, Udmurtia and Bashkortostan. Free Idel-Ural declares their aim to join these national republics into an interstate association like the European Union. The movement stresses that every republic will realize its domestic and foreign policy independently, but together will provide collective security, common border security, unified customs space, and a common currency.

Meanwhile, Free Idel-Ural has presented its program, where its aims and tasks, while the republics remain within the Russian Federation, have been outlined. In particular, the movement favors contractual relations between the republics and the federal center. The republics of Idel-Ural must have the right of veto in questions related to their interests, and also be able to establish independent relations with other states and international organizations. The status of citizens should be constitutionally defined in the Republics of Idel-Ural and laws on citizenship should be adopted.

Free Idel-Ural calls for the governments and citizens of the republics of Povolzhye to give up the idea of the revision of this borders between republics. A political map of Idel-Ural, which was presented at Book Forum Lviv on September 23, 2018, became one of the movement's most successful projects. Syreś Boläeń noted that although the ethnic lands of the Bashkirs, Tatars, Chuvash, Mari, Erzyans, and Mokshans spread far outside the modern republics' borders, any revision of the latter, especially inter-republican borders, would have catastrophic consequences for the national movements of Idel-Ural. According to Boläeń, the very fact of the republics' presence, with their acknowledged administrative borders, is a great achievement of national movements, which will serve as a starting point in the process of gaining independence from Russia.

=== Army and military service ===
Special territorial defence units would be created within the territory of the Republics of Idel-Ural. These units would provide compulsory military training and service for citizens of the Republics, regardless of their nationality or ethnic origin. One year of military or police service, served by every citizen from 18 to 30 years, would be obligatory. Every citizen who completed such service would have the right to own and carry personal firearms. Weapons sales would be legal only to citizens who have reached the age of 21 and only in state shops.

The movement strongly rejects obligatory military service of citizens of the Republics outside Idel-Ural.

Free Idel-Ural stands for the proclamation of the Republics as an area free from nuclear weapons. The movement supports both the removal of weapons of mass destruction from the territory of the Republics and the reduction of conventional weapons.

=== National policy ===
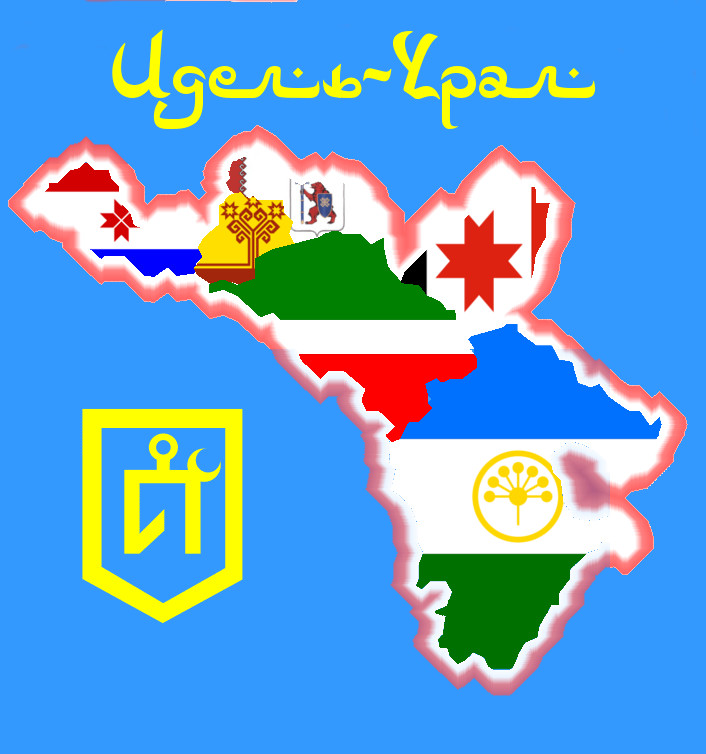
Republics of Idel-Ural

The Free Idel-Ural movement stands for the right for the people of Idel-Ural to receive the full scope of high school, college and university education in the official languages of the Republics. The study of the official languages should be obligatory in all educational establishments from first to last academic year. A quota principle would be implemented to establish representative bodies of power, according to which a majority of the mandates would always rest with representatives of native peoples.

Cultural autonomy for native peoples would be provided in the Republics, realizing fundamental cultural and social rights, such as the right to access education in mother tongues; the right to create cultural and educational societies; and the right to establish mass media.

State administration and record keeping must use the official languages of the Republics, switching to Russian to communicate with other subjects of the Russian Federation. The official languages of the Republics also should be the preferable option to using in the social services sector.

Authentic names should be returned to cities, towns, villages, other settlements, and toponymical objects, many of which were named or renamed in the process of the "Kremlin's colonial policy of Russification".

== Activity ==
The main objectives of the Free Idel-Ural movement are educational activity and human rights defence. Activists organize mass meetings and pickets near diplomatic offices of the Russian Federation in European states to draw attention to the problems of native peoples of Povolzhye. The movement financially supports the families of political prisoners, serving their politically motivated sentences in Russia, and also reports information to the world about the current situation with Erzya, Moksha, Chuvash, Mari, Tatar, Udmurt and Bashkir people in Idel-Ural.

Free Idel-Ural is making an Internet broadcast in the Erzya language. These include reviews of news on global politics, economics, sport, and culture, and are available a few times every month. The Torpinghen’ Blocknote (erz. Military notebook) program, which provides information about modern-day military conflicts, introduces new products from the military industry and discusses Erzyan military history, is also available via the Internet.

=== Language defence ===
Meetings and picketing to support the Erzya, Moksha, Chuvash, Mari, Tatar, Udmurt and Bashkir languages were the very first mass public actions of the Free Idel-Ural civic movement. In April 2018, an international advocacy campaign named "Protect Languages of Idel-Ural" launched under Free Idel-Ural's initiative. During the campaign activists in Idel-Ural and abroad were taking selfies in public places with banners to support their mother tongue. Photos were shared on social networks with a strong and clear appeal to show language firmness and to resist Russification.

The campaign's finale was held on April 28, 2018, with simultaneous picketing of the diplomatic offices of the Russian Federation in countries around the world. These actions took place under the slogan "Protect Languages of Idel-Ural", and were aimed to draw public attention in many countries to the policy of Russification, which is conducted by Moscow against the peoples of Idel-Ural.

== See also ==
- Free Nations of Post-Russia Forum
- Idel-Ural State
- Pan-Finno-Ugrism
- Pan-Turkism
