= Aktyubinsky, Republic of Tatarstan =

Aktyubinsky Актюбинский
- Urban-type settlement

Other transcription(s)
  - Tatar: Актүбә
- Interactive map of Aktyubinsky
- Location of Aktyubinsky Aktyubinsky (Tatarstan)
- Coordinates: 54°49′N 52°48′E
- Country: Russia
- Federal subject: Tatarstan
- Administrative district: Aznakayevsky District
- Founded: July 5, 1956
- Urban-type settlement status since: August 27, 1956
- Elevation: 307 m (1,007 ft)

Population (2010 Census)
  - Total: 9,237
  - Estimate (2021): 8,022 (−13.2%)

Municipal status
  - Municipal district: Aznakayevsky Municipal District
  - Urban settlement: Aktyubinsky Urban Settlement
  - Capital of: Aktyubinsky Urban Settlement
- Time zone: UTC+3 (MSK)
- Postal code: 423304
- OKTMO ID: 92602157051

Aktyubinsky (Russian: Актюбинский; Tatar: Актүбә) is an urban locality (an urban-type settlement) in Aznakayevsky District of the Republic of Tatarstan, Russia, located on the Leninogorsk–Aznakayevo auto route, 21 kilometers (13 mi) west of Aznakayevo. As of the 2010 Census, its population was 9,237.

== History ==
It was established on July 5, 1956 and was granted urban-type settlement status on August 27, 1956.

== Administrative and municipal status ==
Within the framework of administrative divisions, the urban-type settlement of Aktyubinsky is subordinated to Aznakayevsky District. As a municipal division, Aktyubinsky is incorporated within Aznakayevsky Municipal District as Aktyubinsky Urban Settlement.

== Economy ==
As of 1997, industrial enterprises in Aktyubinsky included an oil extracting plant, a bakery, and a logging company.

== Demographics ==
Aktyubinsky population
- 2010 Census: 9,237
- 2002 Census: 9,945
- 1989 Census: 8,370
- 1979 Census: 6,309

As of the 1989 Census, the population was mostly Tatar (57.9%) and Russian (35.6%). Other ethnicities of note included Ukrainians (1.9%), Chuvash (1.8%), and Mordvins (1.2%).
