= Bugulma-Belebey Upland =

Upland in the Eastern European Plain in Russia

- Бугульминско-Белебеевская возвышенность/ Бөгөлмә-Бәләбәй ҡалҡыулығы
- Location within Russia

Highest point
- Elevation: 418 m (1,371 ft)
- Coordinates: 54°30′N 53°00′E

Geography
- Country: Russia
- Federal subjects: Tatarstan; Bashkortostan; Orenburg Oblast

Bugulma-Belebey Upland (Russian: Бугульминско-Белебеевская возвышенность; Bashkir: Бөгөлмә-Бәләбәй ҡалҡыулығы; Tatar: Бөгелмә-Бәләбәй калкулыгы) is an upland in the eastern part of Eastern European Plain, west of the Urals, in Tatarstan, Bashkortostan and Orenburg Oblast, Russia. It forms the drainage divide of the Volga, Kama and Belaya rivers. The upper point of the upland is 418 m height. Romashkino field is placed there.

== See also ==
- Chatyr-Tau
