= Yanurusovo =

Yanurusovo Янурусово
- Selo
- Location within Bashkortostan Location within Russia
- Coordinates: 53°41′N 56°21′E
- Country: Russia
- Region: Bashkortostan
- District: Ishimbaysky District
- Time zone: UTC+5:00

Yanurusovo (Russian: Янурусово; Bashkir: Йәнырыҫ, Yänırıś) is a rural locality (a selo) and the administrative centre of Yanurusovsky Selsoviet, Ishimbaysky District, Bashkortostan, Russia. The population was 748 as of 2010. There are 8 streets.

== Geography ==
Yanurusovo is located 49 km northeast of Ishimbay (the district's administrative centre) by road. Kiyaukovo is the nearest rural locality.
