= Chatyr-Tau =

Upland in Tatarstan, Russia

- Çatır-Taw

Highest point
- Elevation: 321.7 m (1,055 ft)
- Coordinates: 54°53′N 53°11′E

Dimensions
- Length: 12 km (7.5 mi)
- Width: 3 km (1.9 mi)

Geography
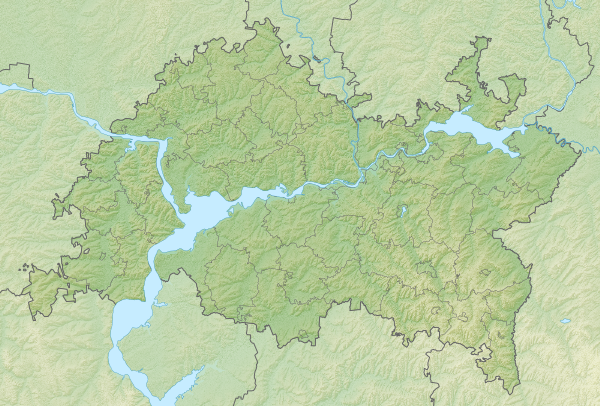
- Location within Tatarstan
- Country: Russia
- Parent range: Bugulma-Belebey Upland

Chatyr-Tau or Chatyrtau (/ˌʃʌtərˈtaʊ/ SHUT-ər-TOW, rhymes with "now"; Russian: Чатыр-тау or Чатыртау; Tatar: Чатыр-тау, romanized: Çatır-taw, or Чатыртау, Çatırtaw, IPA: [ɕɑˌtɤ̞ɾˈtɑʊ]), also known as Shatyor-Gora (Russian: Шатёр-гора; both lit. 'Tent Mountain'), is an upland near Aznakayevo, Tatarstan, Russia, sometimes referred as an only range of Tatarstan. The highest point is 321.7 m. The range is a natural monument of Tatarstan since 1972.

== See also ==
- List of highest points of Russian federal subjects
