= Nurkeyevo =

Nurkeyevo Нуркеево
- Village
- Location within Bashkortostan Location within Russia
- Coordinates: 54°34′N 53°47′E
- Country: Russia
- Region: Bashkortostan
- District: Tuymazinsky District
- Time zone: UTC+5:00

Nurkeyevo (Russian: Нуркеево; Bashkir: Нөркәй, Nörkäy) is a rural locality (a village) in Subkhankulovsky Selsoviet, Tuymazinsky District, Bashkortostan, Russia. The population was 888 as of 2010. There are 18 streets.

== Geography ==
Nurkeyevo is located 8 km southeast of Tuymazy (the district's administrative centre) by road. Staroye Subkhankulovo is the nearest rural locality.
