= Sarmanovo =

Rural locality in Sarman District, Tatarstan

Coordinates: 55°15′09″N 52°35′09″E

Sarmanovo (Russian: Сарманово, Tatar: Сарман) is a rural locality (a selo) and the administrative center of Sarmanovsky District of the Republic of Tatarstan, Russia. Population: 7,153 (2010 census); 6,327 (2002 census); 5,374 (1989 Soviet census).
