= Syreś Boläeń =

Erzya poet and resistance leader

- Сыресь Боляень
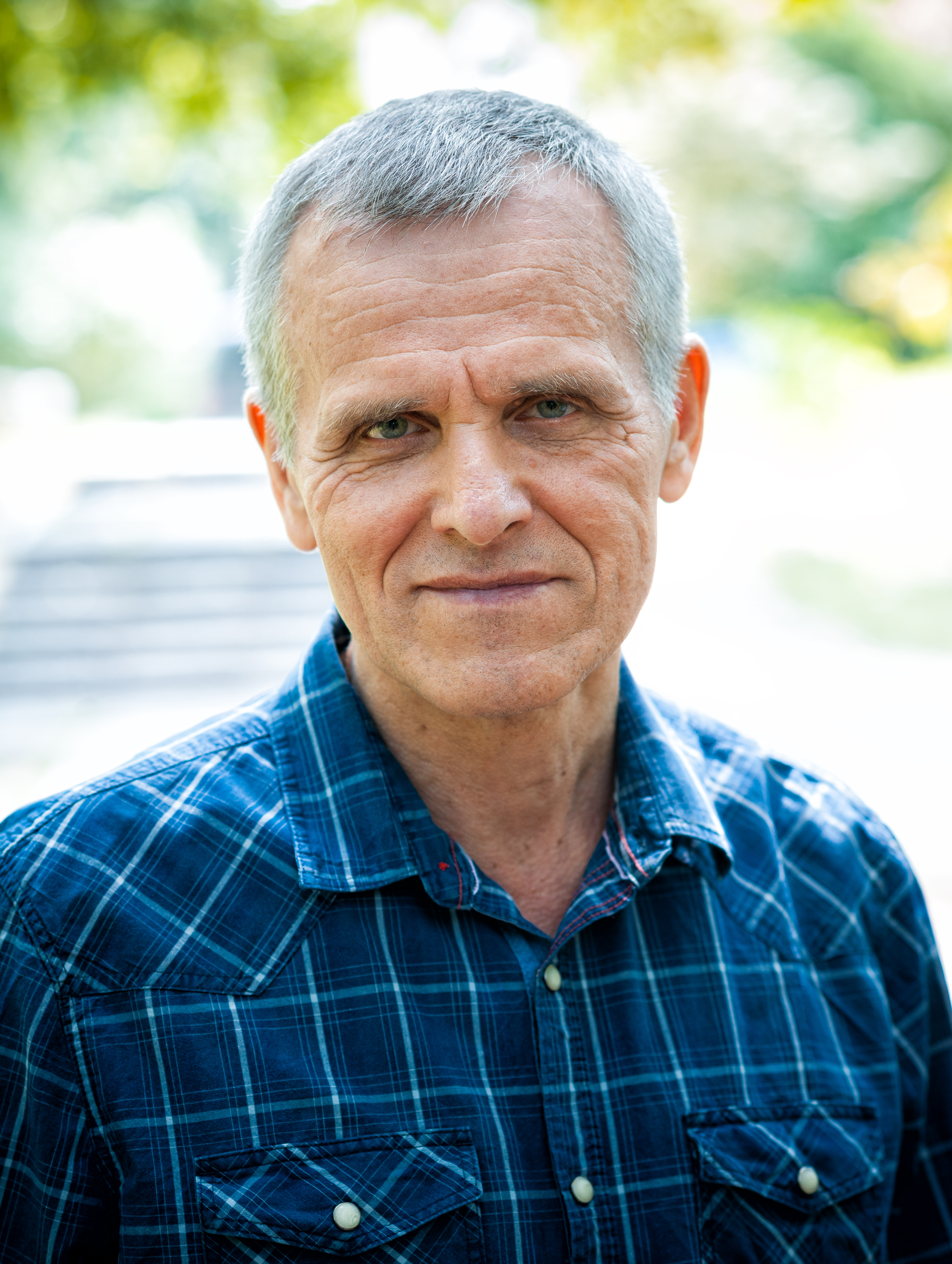
- Boläeń in 2019

Personal details
- Born: Alexander Grigorievich Bolkin; 7 May 1958 (age 68) Saransk, Mordvin ASSR, Russian SFSR, Soviet Union
- Party: Erzya National Movement
- Education: Kyiv Military Aviation Engineering Academy

Syreś Boläeń (born Alexander Bolkin on May 7, 1958) is a Erzya public figure, poet, translator, co-founder of the decolonization Free Idel Ural Movement and a leader of the Erzya National Movement, having been elected as Inyazor (a title for Erzya leaders since the 13th century). He took part in Euromaidan in Ukraine, is against the Russian invasion of Ukraine, having fought on the side of Ukraine. He was born in a mixed Erzya–Russian family. Boläeń's mother is an ethnic Russian while his father is an ethnic Erzya.
