= Aznakayevsky District =

Aznakayevsky District Азнакаевский район (Russian)
- District

Other transcription(s)
  - Tatar: Азнакай районы
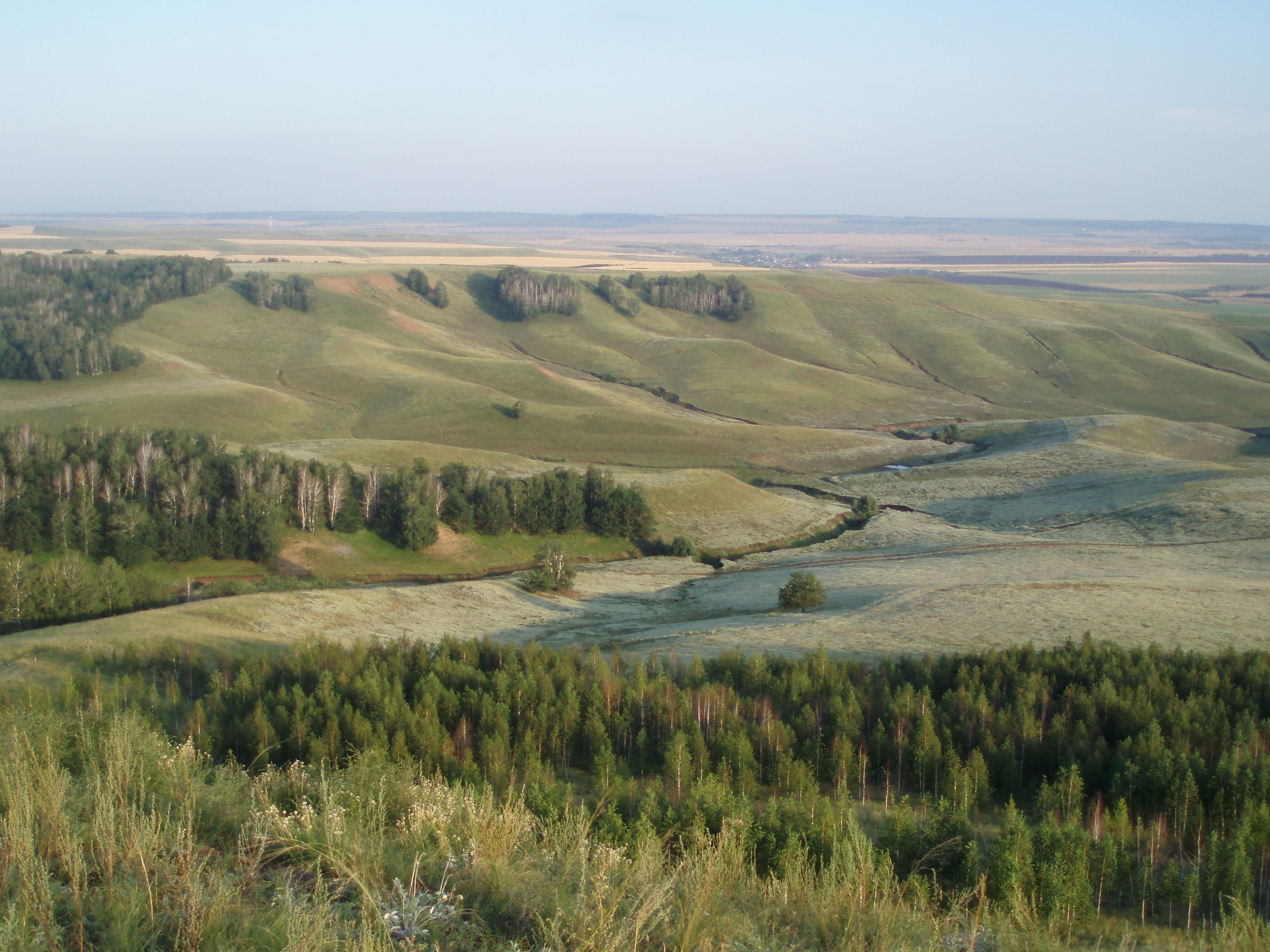
- Chatyr-Tau Nature Area, Aznakayevsky District

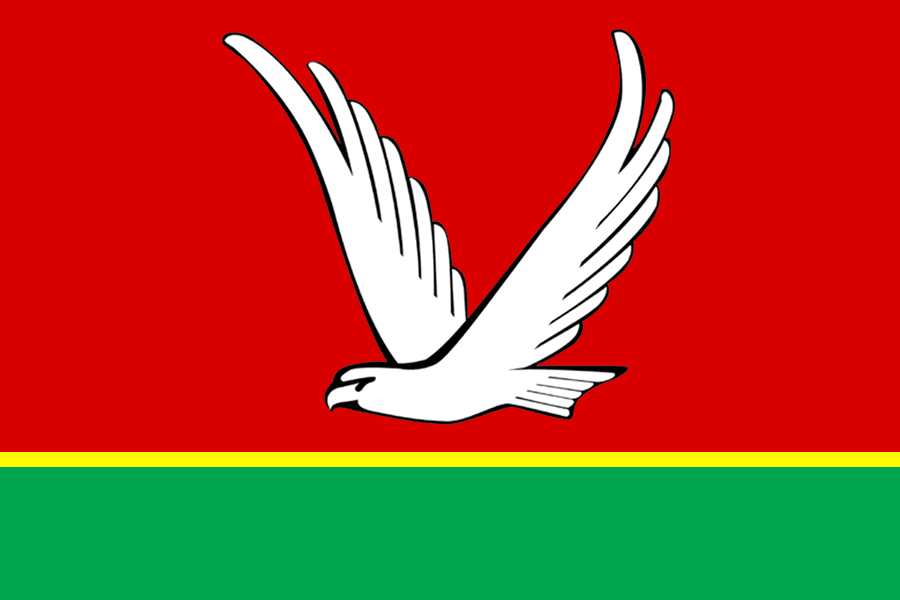
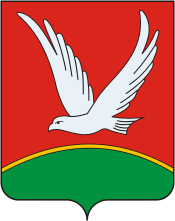
- Flag Coat of arms
- Location of Aznakayevsky District in the Republic of Tatarstan
- Coordinates: 54°54′N 53°06′E
- Country: Russia
- Federal subject: Republic of Tatarstan
- Established: 30 October 1931
- Administrative center: Aznakayevo

Area
  - Total: 2,143.3 km^{2} (827.5 sq mi)

Population (2010 Census)
  - Total: 29,694
  - Density: 13.854/km^{2} (35.883/sq mi)
  - Urban: 31.1%
  - Rural: 68.9%

Administrative structure
  - Inhabited localities: 1 urban-type settlements, 76 rural localities

Municipal structure
  - Municipally incorporated as: Aznakayevsky Municipal District
  - Municipal divisions: 2 urban settlements, 26 rural settlements
- Time zone: UTC+3 (MSK)
- OKTMO ID: 92602000
- Website: http://aznakayevo.tatarstan.ru/

Aznakayevsky District (Russian: Азнака́евский райо́н; Tatar: Азнакай районы) is a territorial administrative unit and municipal district of the Republic of Tatarstan within the Russian Federation. The district is located in the southeast part of the republic. As of 2020, 60,129 people resided in the district. Of these 4,264 resided in urban settlements and 17,482 in rural settlements.

The district was formed on October 30, 1931. In February 1963 the Aznakayevsky district as an administrative unit was abolished and its territory was transferred to Almetyevsky District. In January 1965 the district was restored as an administrative unit of the Tatar Autonomous Soviet Socialist Republic.

Industrial enterprises are mainly concentrated in the city of Aznakayevo which serves as the administrative center of the district. The Romashkino Oil Field is located in the district, a result of which has been the attraction of many enterprises specializing in mechanical engineering and metalworking, light and food industries, as well as oil and gas production companies to the region.

Mount Chatyr-Tau (321.7 m above sea level) is located in the Aznakaevsky district. The mount is the highest geographic feature in Tatarstan.

== Geography ==
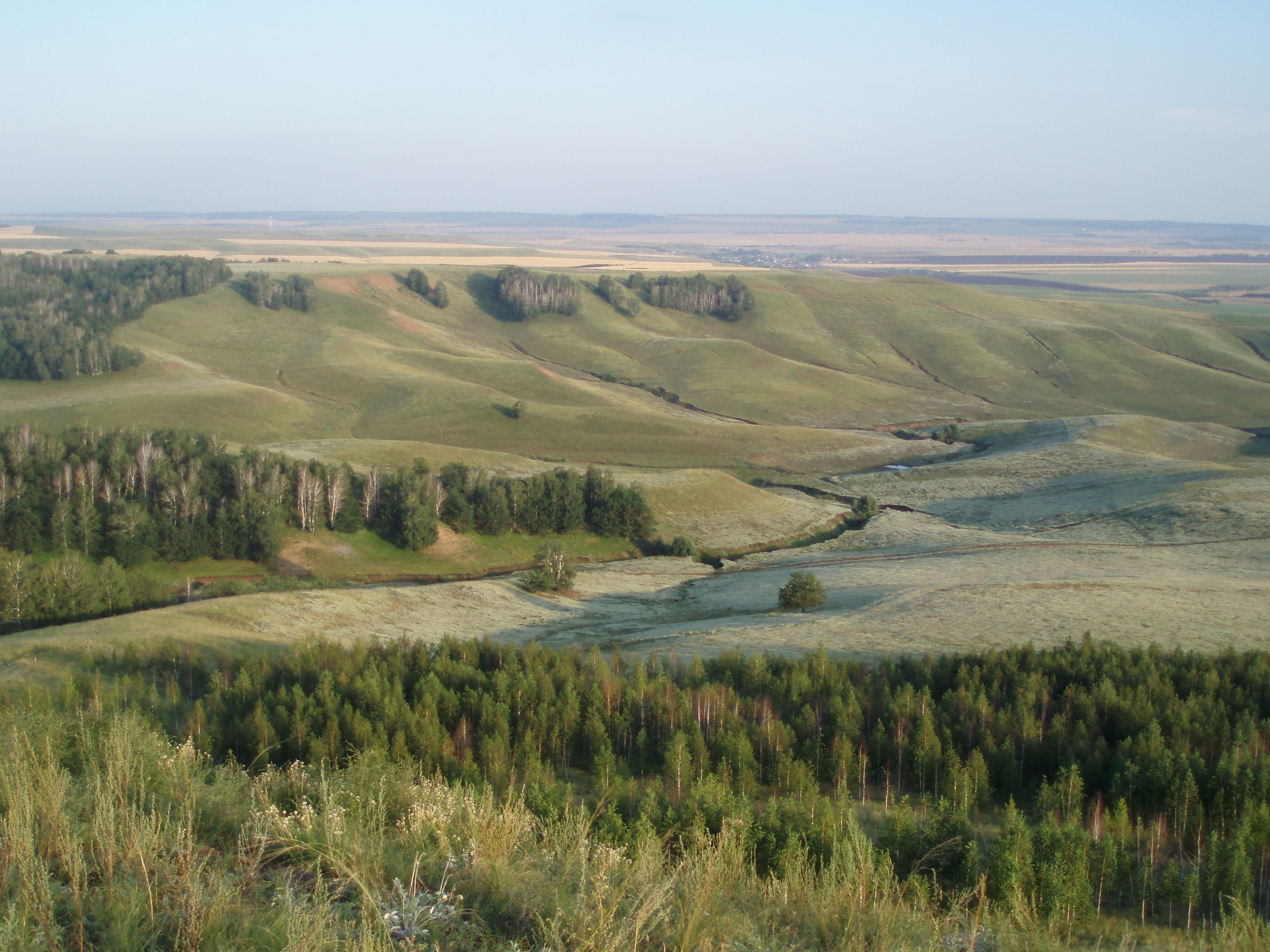
Chatyr-Tau nature reserve, 2015

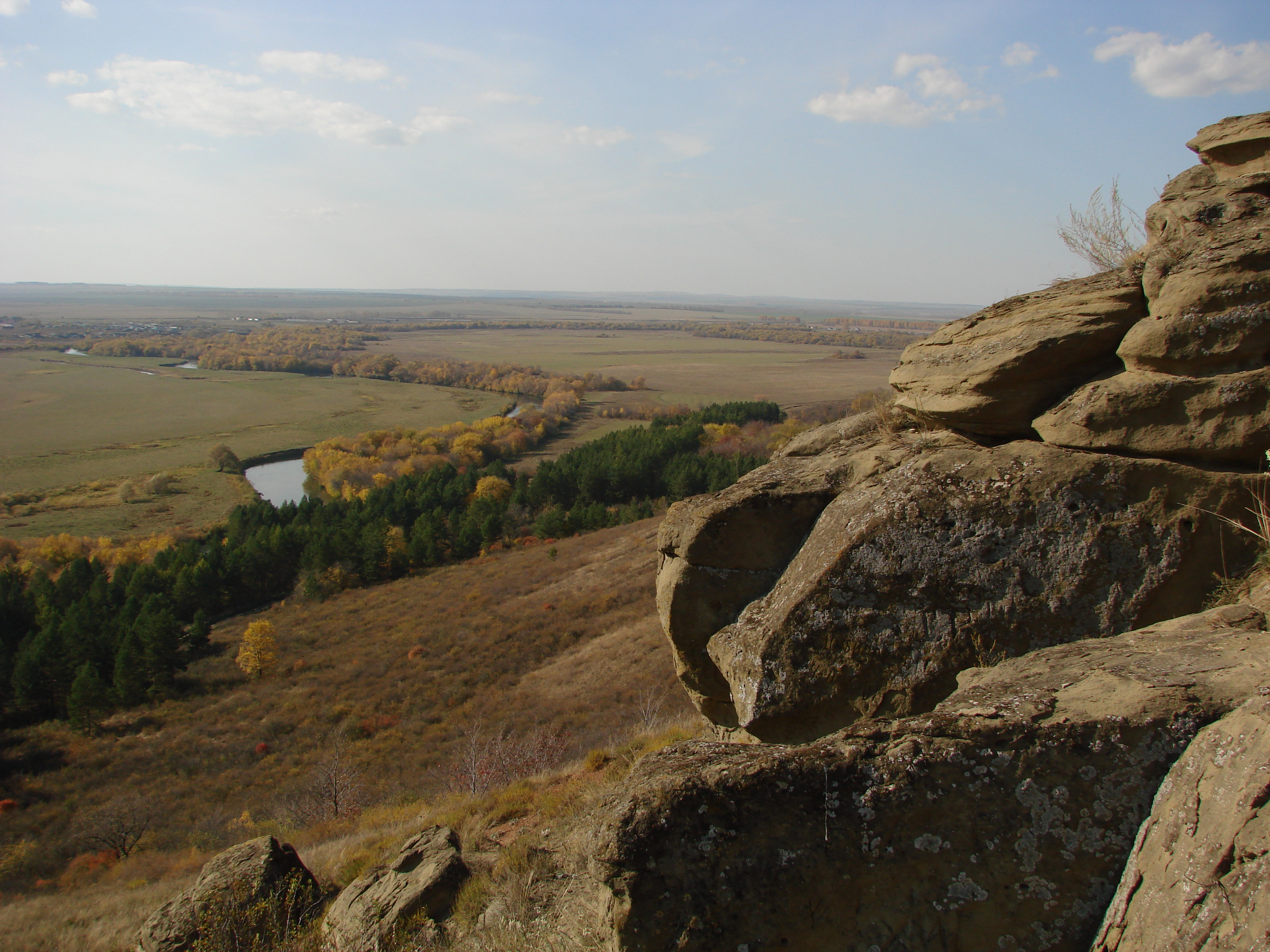
Chekan tract, 2008

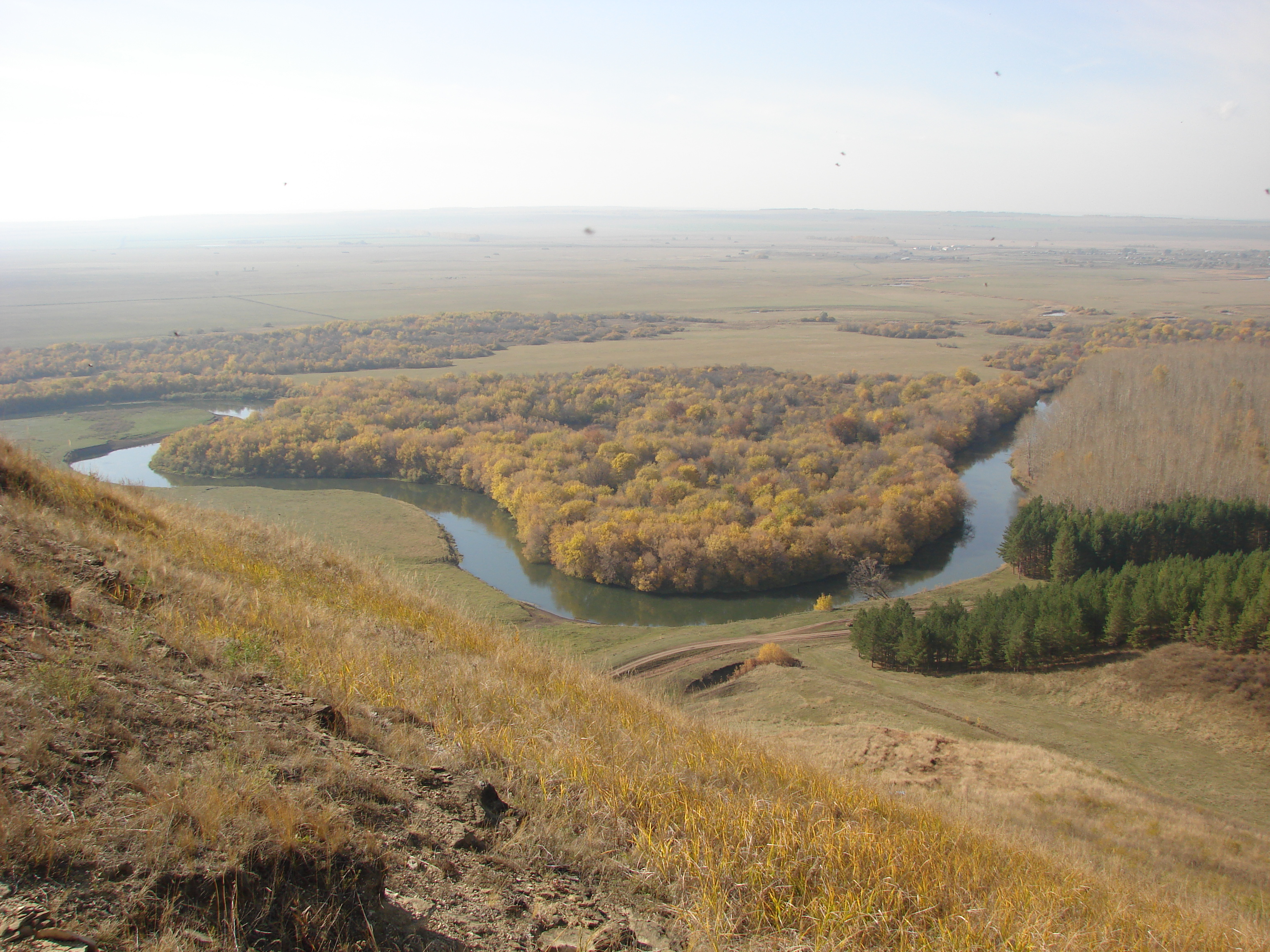
Ik River, 2008

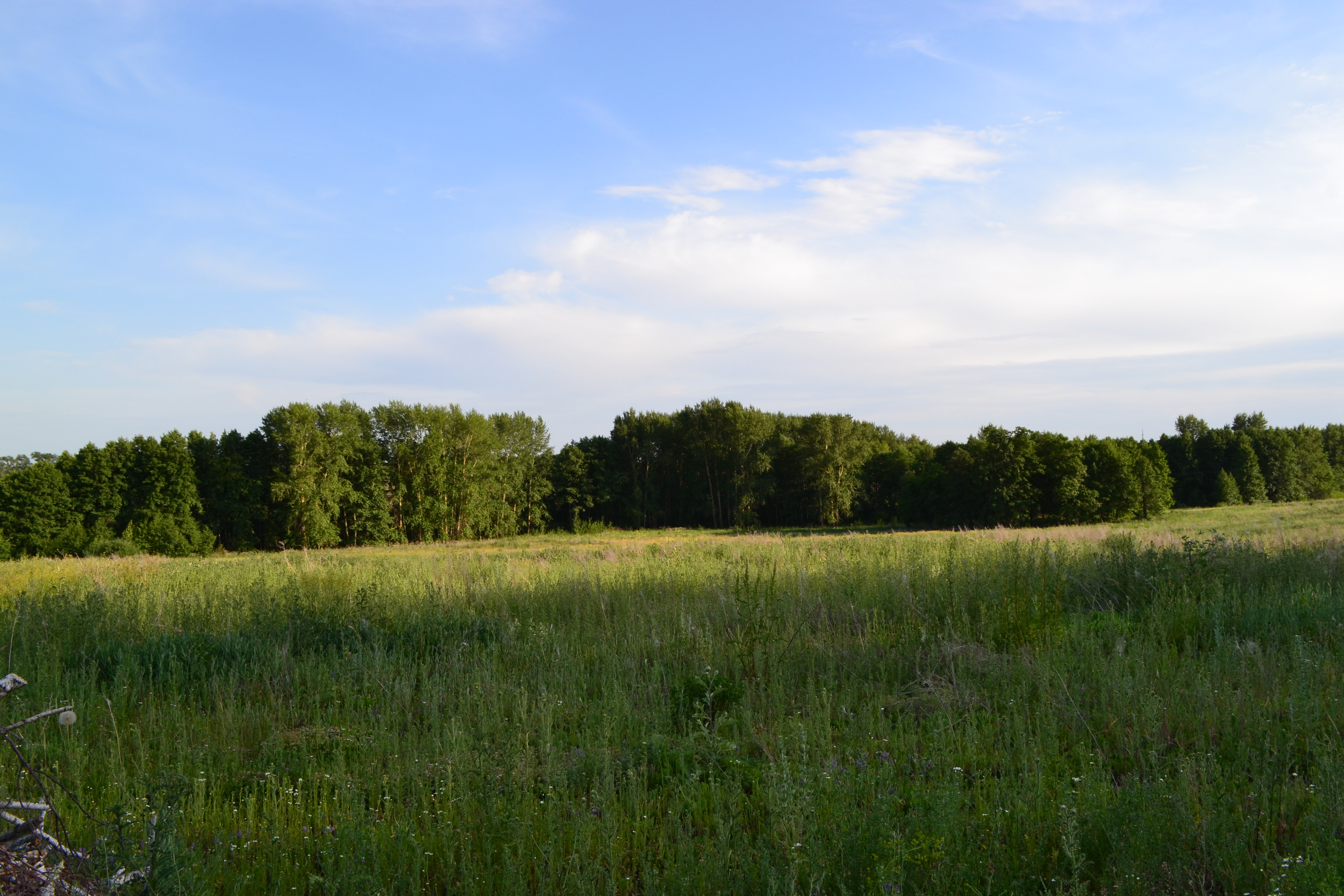
Vladimirsky slope (Aktobe massif), 2013

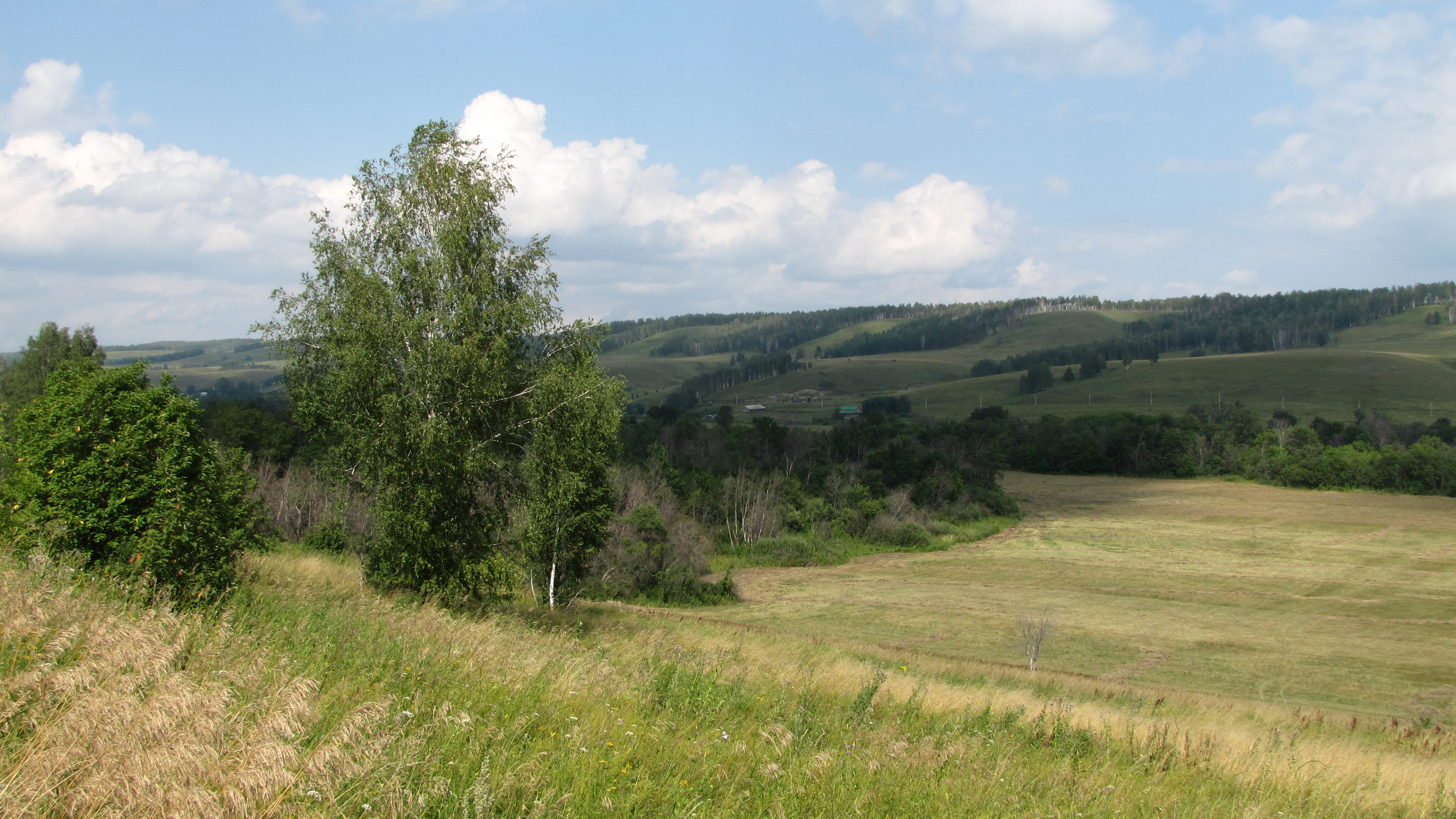
Local fields

The district borders the Muslymovsky, Sarmanovsky, Almetyevsky, Bugulminsky and Yutazinsky districts of the republic. To the east it borders the Bakalinsky and Sharansky districts of Bashkortostan.

The Aznakayevsky district encompasses a total land area of 2143.3 km^{2}. The district is located in the south-east of Tatarstan in the forest-steppe zone of the Eastern Trans-Kama region. The topography of the region is an elevated plain extends from the threshold of the Ural Mountains on the Bugulma plateau and occupies the northeast section of the Bugulma-Belebey Upland (Mount Chatyr-Tau is a landmark of the region and the highest point of Tatarstan).

== Coat of arms and flag ==
The falcon depicted on the district coat of arms symbolizes the region and its inhabitants. Its black silhouette and highly raised wings in the form of a rapidly gushing fountain are a symbol of the oil reserves that provide the foundation of the regional economy. At the same time, the flying bird emphasizes the continuation of cultural traditions and the spiritual continuity preserved by many generations of local residents. Silver is a symbol of purity, perfection, peace and mutual understanding. The agricultural development of the district is reflected by a gold stripe. The color green symbolizes nature, health, ecology, life growth. Red is a symbol of labor, strength, courage and beauty.

The flag of the Aznakayevsky municipal district was developed on the basis of the district coat of arms. The flag presents itself a rectangular panel, divided horizontally into three unequal stripes which repeat the image of the coat of arms.

== History ==
The district is named after its administrative center Aznakayevo. The word "Aznakayevo" comes from Bashkir word «Аҙна» which means "week, weekly".

Bashkirs have traditionally resided on the territory of the district. There is also a group of unique archeological burial monuments from the 14th century located in the district. These are small Muslim cemeteries characterized by stone tombstones bearing Arabic inscriptions upon them and deep grave pits as well as a pronounced Muslim ritual elements. These sites differ markedly in comparison to typical burial sites of the area, which are usually earthen burial grounds without grave structures, distinguished by simple shallow burial pits, a predominant southwestern orientation of the head of the deceased and a clear fixation with pagan remnants in early Muslim rituals. Such burials may indicate the presence of sedentary ethnic groups in the region as early as the 14th century, but no evidence of a single settlement monument or settlement has been found near these cemeteries.

After the Bolsheviks came to power in 1918, selsoviets and volost executive committees were formed in the districts. Until 1920, these entities were part of the Bugulma uezd of the Samara Governorate and the Menzelinsky uezd of the Ufa Governorate. From 1920 to 1930, the territory was included in the Bugulma canton of the TASSR.

On July 23, 1930, all the cantons of the TASSR were abolished, and districts were formed in their place. The area of the current district was originally named Tumutuk district until October 30, 1931, when it was renamed as the Aznakaevsky district. Four years later, there was a reorganization of the districts in the region, reinstating the Tumutuk among 17 other districts. In 1958 the Tumutuk district was finally abolished and its territory was transferred to the Aznakaevsky district. The Aznakaevsky district was abolished for a period of two years in 1963 with its territory being annexed to the Almetyevsky District. On January 12, 1965, the Aznakayevsky district was finally reestablished and restored to its status as a district within its current borders.

Active industrialization of the region began in 1951 when the Romashkino oil field was discovered.

=== Modern Aznakaevsky District ===
From 1992 to 2005, the head of the district administration and the city of Aznakaevo was the people's deputy of Tatarstan Anas Iskhakov. starting in 2005, this position was held by Mansur Khairutdinov who was appointed by the decree of the President of the Republic Mintimer Shaimiev.

In 2008, Rafis Galiyev was appointed as the new head of the district. After three years he left his position and began working for the Tatneft company. The duties of the head of the district were subsequently entrusted to Marsel Shaydullin, who became the district head in October 2012.

== Municipal-territorial structure ==
There are 2 urban and 26 rural settlements comprising a further 78 settlements within the Aznakayevsky municipal district. 69.8% of the district population reside in urban settlements.

== Economy ==
=== Industry ===
The largest industrial enterprises of the region
Industry	Name of the enterprises
Oil and gas production	«Aznakaevskneft», Aznakaevsky workshop, «Burenie», «Tatneft-AkhnakaevskRemService», ANPS, «Geologiia», «NNK-Geophysics», «Aznakaevsky horizon», «Geotech»
Mechanical engineering and metalworking	"Neftemash", "Perekryvatel", "Tekhkomplekt"
Food industry	«Aznakaevsk butter-making plant» (branch "Vitamin"), «Aznakaevsky ikmek», «Aznakaevsky food processing plant»
Light industry	Garment factory "Aznakay kiemnere"

A significant part of the Romashkino oil field is located within the borders of the Aznakaevsky district. This section of the field has been designated as an independent development object under the "Aznakaevskaya area" designation. Industrial enterprises of the district are concentrated mainly in the administrative center of the district in the city of Aznakayevo. The proximity of the Aznakaevskaya area has attracted many enterprises that specialize in providing mechanical engineering, metalworking, light industry and food services to the oil and gas complex in the district.

=== Agriculture ===
Agriculture
Company category	Number of companies	Titles	Occupied territory
Large investors	2	«Agrosila - group "(Agrofirm" Aznakay ")	35 %
Large investors	2	"Soyuz Agro" (regional production complex Aktyubensky)	14 %
Independent farms	12 %	"Agro TNGS I", "Mars", "Society. H. Mustakimov "," Tukai "," Tuikino "," Chalpy "," Taly Bulyak "," Styarle ", F. R. Karimov's farm	37 %
Peasant (farm) households	>50		14 %

The agricultural sector in the district is concentrated primarily in the livestock industry, specializing in dairy and beef cattle breeding, sheep breeding, and beekeeping. Farmers in the district also cultivate spring wheat, winter rye, barley, buckwheat, peas, and sugar beets. The district encompasses a total area of 165,500 hectares, of which 21.1 hectares is occupied by an agricultural joint venture while 137,300 hectares are occupied by farmland, of which 112,000 hectares is arable land.

In 2007, the Aznakayevsky district occupied a leading position in Tatarstan in terms of gross production and economic indicators of buckwheat growing in Tatarstan [43]. As of October 2020, almost 23 thousand hectares of winter crops were sown in the region [44]. In 2020, the district also occupied a leading position in the volume of rapeseed cultivated with 10 thousand hectares of land in the district under cultivation for the growing of this industrial crop.

The Aznakaevsky district ranks sixth in the republic in terms of milk production. As of November 2020, milk yields in the district amounted to 142.7 tons per day (on average 18.4 kg per cow).

=== Investment potential ===
According to the assessment of the Committee for Social and Economic Monitoring of the Republic of Tatarstan, the volume of investment in fixed assets of the Aznakayevsky district for the period January–June 2020 amounted to almost 1.8 billion rubles, or 0.8% of the total volume of investment in Tatarstan during that period.

According to a report by the Federal State Statistics Service of the republic, 4.3 billion rubles in investment was attracted to the Aznakaevsky district in 2019 (excepting budgetary funds and income from small businesses), a sum that amounted to a 1.2% the regional share for investment in the republic for that year. During the prior year 2018, the district attracted a similar level of investment at 4.2 billion rubles.

Most investment in the district is oriented towards sectors such as mining (almost 1 billion rubles), construction (almost 46 million), electricity (9.5 million), agricultural development, hunting and fishing (7.8 million), manufacturing (4.5 million), healthcare (4.2 million), and trade (3.5 million).

=== Housing fund ===
Commissioning of residential buildings
	2018				2019				2020 (January–June)			
	м²	%	в РТ		м²	%	в РТ		м²	%	в РТ	
	м²	%	м²	% district	м²	%	м²	% district	м²	%	м²	% district
Всего	21 912	100	2 409 949	0,91	22 362	100	2 675 529	0,84	10 614	100	1 353 428	0,78
Including enterprises and organizations	9 443	43,1	1 301 195	0,73	1294	5,79	1 569 808	0,08	-	-	551 485	-
Including the population	12 469	56,9	1 108 754	1,12	21 068	94,21	1 105 721	1,91	10 614	100	801 943	1,32

=== Transport ===
The main roads in the region are the Naberezhnye Chelny (M7) - Aznakaevo - Oktyabrsky (M5), 16K-0077 "Aznakaevo - Almetyevsk" and 16K-0078 "Aznakaevo -Bugulma".

There are no railways in the district. The Bugulma Airport is located close to the southwestern border of the district.

== Ecology ==
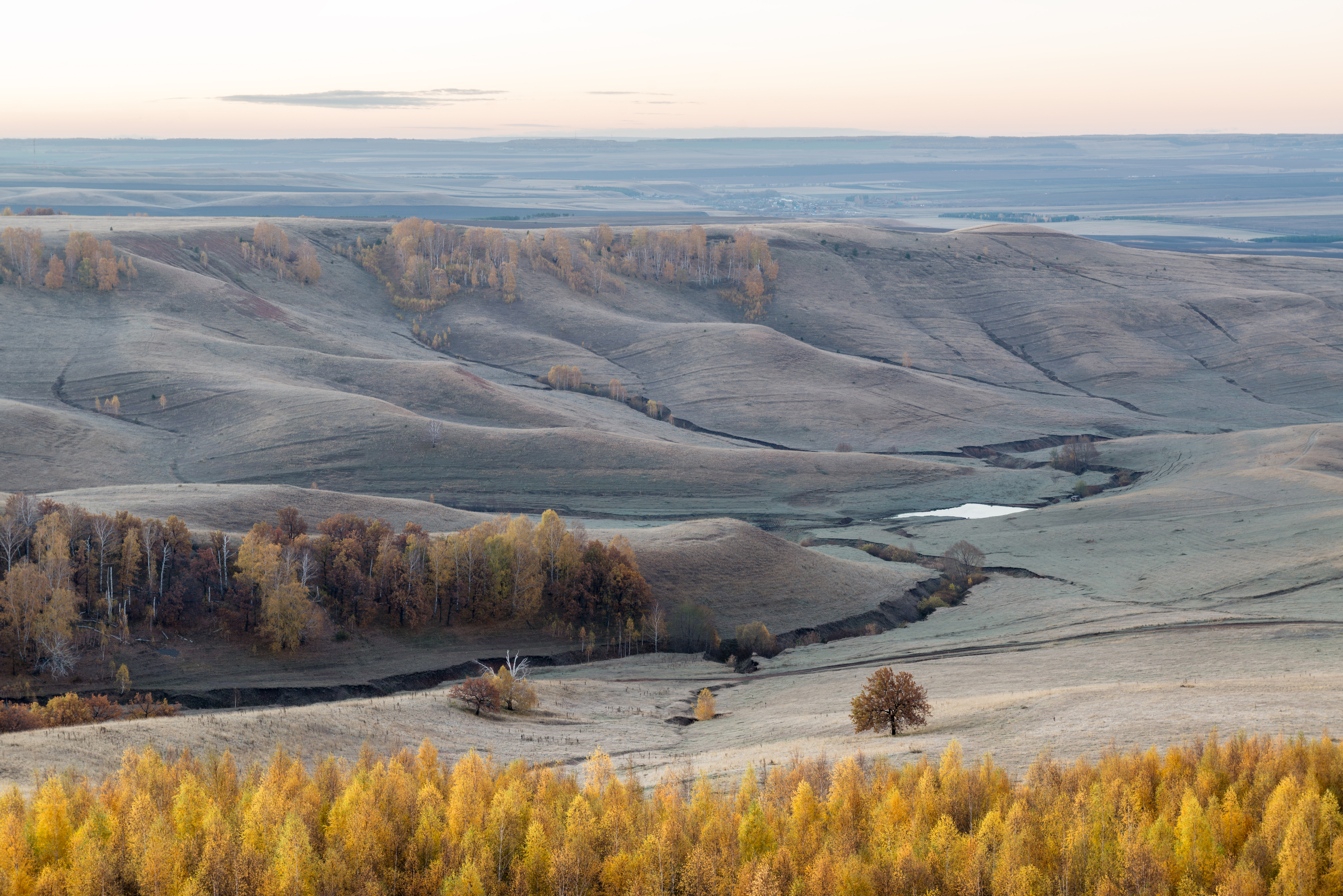
Chatyr-Tau nature reserve

The total length of rivers in the region is 780 km. The largest of these and the main transport artery of the region is the Ik river, a tributary of the Kama. The Ik and Stärle are natural monuments of regional importance. There are many lakes on the Ika floodplain, mainly oxbow lakes on the terraces above the floodplain. Additionally there are lakes of karst origin, including Lake Bolshoi Kizay.

The territory of the district is located in the forest steppe zone. Here temperate deciduous forests alternate with fragments of steppe meadows and meadow steppe. Maple-linden-oak, as well as aspen-birch forests with an admixture of broad-leaved species prevail in the Trans-Kama region. The main massifs are found in the west of the region in the left-bank part of the Mellya river basin as well as on the right bank of the Ik river near the south-eastern border of the region. The total forest cover of the territory stands at 16.8%. Steppe vegetation is composed of herbaceous varieties of festuca valesiaca, stipa, bluegrass and colorful forbs. The fauna of the region includes representative species typical of forest, steppe and near-water environments in the region.

The largest protected natural area in the Aznakayevsky district is the Chatyr-Tau State Nature Reserve with an area of 4149 hectares and is designated as a protected natural area of regional significance.

There is also a natural monument in the region, the Chekan tract. The tract is a 2073 hectare pine forest on the right bank of the Ik River with a rich undergrowth of prunus tenella, prunus fruticosa, genista tinctoria and wild rose. Here one can find other rare plant species, such as melica altissima, xylocopa valga, red harvester ant, catocala fraxini, eastern imperial eagle, lesser kestrel, merlin, and the European bee-eater.

Another state nature reserve "Vladimirsky slope" is located on the right bank of the Yamashka River. The Vladimirsky slope reserve contains preserved areas of herb-fescue and cereal-feather grass steppe with the largest known population of adonis vernalis and varieties of meadow, steppe plants and insects listed in the Red Book of Tatarstan.

In 1978, the Aznakaevsky hunting reserve with an area of 30 thousand hectares was created for the protection of the bobak marmot. In addition to marmots, elk, wild boar, roe deer, capercaillie and gray partridges also make the reserve their habitat.

== Social area ==
There are forty-five mosques and an Orthodox church of Sergius of Radonezh in Aktyubinsk in the region.

In 2020, the district had 57 kindergartens, 32 schools, three institutions of supplementary education, 13 general education schools with 13 branches, of which 18 offer instruction in the Tatar language, two offer instruction in both Russian and Tatar and ten teach primarily in Russian. The district has a gymnasium, a school offering intensive study of the English language and a lyceum. There are two correctional schools for children with disabilities.

Since 1930, the Mayak newspaper has been published in the region in the Tatar and Russian languages (previously this paper published under the historical names of "Tractor", then later as "Commune"). The Mayak editorial office was closed at the beginning of 1962 and rebuilt in 1965.
