= Aznakayevo =

Town in the Republic of Tatarstan, Russia

Aznakayevo Азнакаево
- Town

Other transcription(s)
  - Tatar: Азнакай

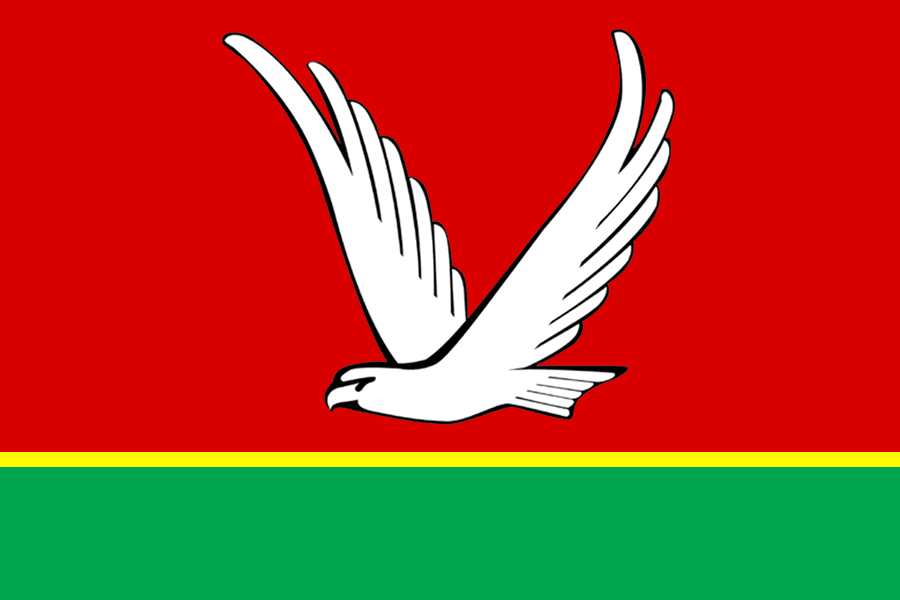
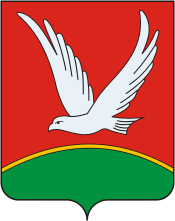
- Flag Coat of arms
- Interactive map of Aznakayevo
- Location of Aznakayevo Aznakayevo (Tatarstan)
- Coordinates: 54°51′N 53°06′E
- Country: Russia
- Federal subject: Tatarstan
- 1762: 1762
- Town status since: 1987
- Elevation: 180 m (590 ft)

Population (2010 Census)
  - Total: 34,853
  - Estimate (2024): 33,905 (−2.7%)

Administrative status
  - Subordinated to: town of republic significance of Aznakayevo
  - Capital of: town of republic significance of Aznakayevo, Aznakayevsky District

Municipal status
  - Municipal district: Aznakayevsky Municipal District
  - Urban settlement: Aznakayevo Urban Settlement
  - Capital of: Aznakayevsky Municipal District, Aznakayevo Urban Settlement
- Time zone: UTC+3 (MSK)
- Postal codes: 423330–423333, 423303
- OKTMO ID: 92602101001

Aznakayevo (Russian: Азнака́ево; Tatar: Азнакай) is a town in the Republic of Tatarstan, Russia, located on the Styarlya River (left tributary of the Ik), 376 kilometers (234 mi) southeast from Kazan. Population: 34,853 (2010 census); 35,412 (2002 census); 32,171 (1989 Soviet census).

== Geography ==
Chatyr-Tau range is located 7 kilometers (4.3 mi) east of Aznakayevo.

== Administrative and municipal status ==
Within the framework of administrative divisions, Aznakayevo serves as the administrative center of Aznakayevsky District, even though it is not a part of it. As an administrative division, it is incorporated separately as the town of republic significance of Aznakayevo—an administrative unit with the status equal to that of the districts. As a municipal division, the town of republic significance of Aznakayevo is incorporated within Aznakayevsky Municipal District as Aznakayevo Urban Settlement.

== Economy ==
Oil-producing industry is highly developed (oil and gas producing administration "Aznakayevskneft", JSC "RITEK-introduction"); there are some car-building and metal-working enterprises (JSC "Aznakayevo plant "Neftemash"), food industry (Aznakayevo butter-making factory, AO "Aznakayevo Bread", AO "Aznakayevo foodstuff factory"), and light industry (JSC "Aznakayevo Clothes").
