= Romashkino Field =

Oil field in Tatarstan, Russia

Coordinates: 54°34′22.6″N 52°22′11.9″E

Romashkino field
- Location within Russia
- Country: Russia
- Region: Tatarstan
- Offshore/onshore: onshore
- Operator: Tatneft

Field history
- Discovery: 1944
- Start of development: 1948

Production
- Estimated oil in place: 17,200 million barrels (~2.35×10^{9} t)
- Producing formations: Kinovskiy and Pashiyskiy

The Romashkino field (Russian: Ромашкинское нефтяное месторождение; Tatar: Ромашкино нефть чыганагы) is an oil field in Leninogorsky District, southeastern Tatarstan, Russia. It was discovered by the Soviet Government in 1944 in the village of Romashkino. Extraction began in 1948 and some 3.5 billion tonnes of oil had been extracted by July 2025. It is the largest oil field of Volga-Ural Basin. The field is operated by Tatneft.

The field covers approximately 4,200 square kilometres (1,600 sq mi). The oil deposit is lays in depth of about 1,800 metres (5,900 ft) in Kinovskiy and Pashiyskiy formations. Since its commissioning, the Romashkino field had produced over 15 billion barrels (2.4×10^{9} m^{3}) of oil. Statistic analysis predicted depletion at 16.5 to 17.2 billion barrels (2.62×10^{9} to 2.73×10^{9} m^{3}). However, advanced technologies allow for extraction of more oil, including water injection.

== See also ==
- Petroleum industry in Russia
